= List of Welsh writers =

This list of Welsh writers is an incomplete alphabetical list of writers from Wales.

It includes writers in all literary genres, writing in English, Welsh, Latin, or any other language, who have a Wikipedia page. Description as a writer precedes other occupations. It is a subsidiary to the List of Welsh people. See also List of Welsh-language authors, List of Welsh women writers and List of Welsh-language poets (6th century to c. 1600). Abbreviations: c. = about, fl. = active; B = writing in Brythonic, C = writing in Chinese, E = writing in English (including Middle English), F = writing in French, G = writing in German, L = writing in Latin, sl = writing in sign language, W = writing in Welsh (including Middle Welsh).

== A ==
- Jane Aaron (born 1951, EW), writer and scholar
- Richard Ithamar Aaron (1901–1987, E), philosopher
- Siôn Abel (18th century, W), balladeer
- Dannie Abse (1923–2014 E), poet
- Leo Abse (1917–2008, E), political writer and lawyer
- Juliet Ace (born 1938, E), dramatist and scriptwriter
- Adam of Usk (c. 1352–1430, ELW), historian and priest
- Adam the Welshman (c. 1130–1181, L), theologian and bishop
- Patience Agbabi (born 1965, E), poet and performer
- Evan Owen Allen (1805–1852, W), writer and poet
- William Ambrose (Emrys, 1813–1873, W), poet
- Martin Amis (1949–2023, E), novelist
- Aneirin (early medieval, B), Brythonic bard, presumed author of Y Gododdin
- Jane Arden (1927–1982, E), playwright, novelist and film director
- Charles Ashton (1848–1898, W), literary historian
- Asser (died c. 909, L), chronicler, biographer and Bishop of Sherborne
- Tiffany Atkinson (born 1972, E), poet and academic
- William Augustus (fl. 18th century, EW), translator and weather forecaster
- Trezza Azzopardi (born 1961, E), fiction writer and broadcaster

== B ==
- Augustine Baker (1575–1641, E), mystic and religious writer
- Mary Balogh (born 1944, E), novelist
- Meredydd Barker (born 1969, EW), playwright and artist
- William Barlow (died 1625, E), science writer and cleric
- Edward Barnes (fl. c. 1760–1795, W), poet, translator and schoolmaster
- Edward Barnwell (1813–1887, E), archaeologist and headmaster
- Rachel Barrett (1874–1953, E), editor and suffragette
- Desmond Barry (born 1954, E), novelist and playwright
- Thomas Beach (died 1737, E), poet and wine merchant
- Anne Beale (1816–1900, E), novelist and poet
- William Ambrose Bebb (1894–1953, W), author and politician
- Anna Maria Bennett (c. 1750–1808, E), novelist
- Y Bergam (14th century, W), poet and seer
- Ron Berry (1920–1997, E), novelist
- Evan Bevan (1803–1866, W), poet
- Tom Beynon (1886–1961, W), religious writer
- Ruth Bidgood (1922–2022, E), poet
- John Blackwell (Alun, 1797–1841, W), poet
- Emily Rose Bleby (1849–1917), non-fiction writer and temperance activist
- Leslie Bonnet (1902–1985, E), short-story writer and dramatist
- Käthe Bosse-Griffiths (1910–1998, GW), archaeologist
- David James Bowen (1925–2017, W), literary historian
- E. G. Bowen (1900–1983, E), geographer, local historian and academic
- Euros Bowen (1904–1988, W), poet and cleric
- Geraint Bowen (1915–2011, W), poet
- Natasha Bowen (living, E), young adult and fantasy writer
- Siôn Bradford (1706–1785, W), poet and antiquary
- Jane Brereton (1685–1740, E), topical poet
- Rhoda Broughton (1840–1920, E), novelist
- Walter Brut (14th century, E), religious writer
- Robert Bryan (1858–1920, W), poet and folklorist
- Rob Brydon (born 1965, E), television scriptwriter and actor
- Fanny Bulkeley-Owen (1845–1927, E), historian
- Paul Burston (living, E), novelist and non-fiction writer
- Duncan Bush (1946–2017, E), poet, novelist and dramatist
- Hans Busk the Elder (1772–1862, E), poet

== C ==
- Dilys Cadwaladr (1902–1979, W), poet
- Rhys Cadwaladr (fl. 1666–90, W), poet and classical scholar
- Rhys Cain (c. 1540–1614 W), itinerant poet
- Caradoc of Llancarfan (12th century, L), writer and cleric
- Phil Carradice (born 1947, E), writer and broadcaster
- Casnodyn (first half of 14th century, W), poet
- Ronald Cass (1923–2006, E), screenwriter and composer
- Catrin ferch Gruffudd ap Hywel (fl. 1555, W), poet
- Siôn Ceri (early 15th century, W), poet
- Brenda Chamberlain (1912–1971, EW), poet, novelist and artist
- David Charles (1762–1834, W), hymn writer
- Thomas Charles (1755–1814, EW), religious writer
- Irma Chilton (1930–1990, EW), children's writer
- John Clanvowe (c. 1341–1391, E), poet, diplomat and landowner
- Gillian Clarke (born 1937, EW), poet and playwright
- Clement of Llanthony (fl. mid–12th century, L), theologian and prior
- Maurice Clenock (Morys Clynnog, 1525–1581, EW), religious writer
- Hafina Clwyd (1936–2011, W), essayist, journalist and educator
- Grace Coddington (born 1941, E), fashion writer and memoirist
- Catrin Collier (born 1948, E), novelist and playwright
- William Lucas Collins (1815–1887, E), essayist and editor
- William Moreton Condry (1918–1998, E), nature writer and naturalist
- Tony Conran (1931–2013, EW), poet and translator
- Alexander Cordell (1914–1997, E), historical novelist
- Lewys Glyn Cothi (Llewelyn y Glyn, c. 1420–c. 1490, W), poet and scribe
- Peter Cottrell (born 1964, E), military historian and military officer
- Richard Crawley (1840–1893, E), poet, academic and translator
- Jasmine Cresswell (born 1941, E), romantic and historical novelist
- Tom Cullen (born 1985, E), playwright and actor
- Tony Curtis (born 1946, E), poet
- Cynddelw Brydydd Mawr ("the Great Poet", fl. c. 1155–1200, W), court poet

== D ==
- Dafydd ap Dafydd Llwyd (born 1549, W), poet
- Dafydd ab Edmwnd (fl. 1450–97, W), poet
- Dafydd ap Gwilym (c. 1315/1320 – c. 1350/1370, W), poet
- Dafydd ap Hwlcyn ap Madog (17th century, W), poet
- Dafydd Bach ap Madog Wladaidd (fl. 1340–1390, W), poet
- Dafydd Ddu o Hiraddug (died 1371, W), poet, grammarian and cleric
- Dafydd Glyn Dyfrdwy (16th century, W), poet and bard
- Catrin Dafydd (born c. 1982, EW), writer and poet
- Edward Dafydd (17th century, W), bard
- Fflur Dafydd (born 1978, EW), novelist and musician
- Maurice Dafydd (fl. late 18th century, W), hymn writer
- Myrddin ap Dafydd (born 1956, W), writer, bard and editor
- Philip Dafydd (c. 1732 – c. 1814, W), poet
- Thomas Dafydd, religious writer
- Roald Dahl (1916–1990, E), fiction and children's writer, born to Norwegian parents
- John Dalmas (1926–2017, E), science fiction writer
- Glyn Daniel (Dilwyn Rees, 1914–1986, E), archaeologist and novelist
- Lewys Daron (fl. c. 1495 – c. 1530, W), poet
- Mike Dash (born 1963, E), writer and historian
- Andrew Davies (born 1936, E), author and screenwriter
- Aneirin Talfan Davies (1909–1980, W), poet, critic and broadcaster
- Ben Davies (1840–1930, W), Independent minister and author
- Ben Davies (1864–1937, W), poet and Independent minister
- Catherine Glyn Davies (1926–2007, EW), philosopher, historian and translator
- David Davies (1742–1819, E), social historian and cleric
- David Davies (Dai'r Cantwr, c. 1812–1874, W), poet and activist
- David Charles Davies (1826–1891, EW), religious writer and minister
- Deborah Kay Davies (living, E), poet and novelist
- Edward Tegla Davies (1880–1967, W), essayist, children's writer and minister
- Gareth Alban Davies (1926–2009, EW), poet, scholar and translator
- Gwen Davies (born 1964, EW), translator and editor
- Grahame Davies (born 1964, EW), poet and critic
- Idris Davies (1905–1953, EW), coal miner, teacher and poet
- James Kitchener Davies (1902–1952, W), poet and playwright
- John Davies (1938–2015, EW), historian
- John Davies of Mallwyd (c. 1567–1644, WL), translator, scholar and lexicographer
- John Cadvan Davies (1846–1923, W), poet, bard and minister
- John Humphreys Davies (1871–1926, EW), man of letters and lawyer
- Joseph E. Davies (1812–1881), Welsh Calvinistic Methodist minister in America and author
- Margaret Davies (Marged Dafydd, c. 1700–1778 or 1785, EW), poet and scribe
- Mary Davies (Mair Eifion, 1846–1882, W), poet
- Myles Davies (1662–1715 or 1716, EL), pamphleteer and writer
- Pennar Davies (1911–1996, EW), poet, fiction writer and minister
- Rhys Davies (1901–1978, E), fiction writer
- Richard Davies (c. 1505–1581, EW), scholar and bishop
- Richard Davies (Mynyddog, 1833–1877, W), poet and singer
- Russell T Davies (born 1963, E), television screenwriter
- Stevie Davies (living, E), novelist
- T. Glynne Davies (1926–1988, W), poet, novelist and broadcaster
- W. H. Davies (1871–1940, E), poet and tramp
- William David Davies (1897–1969, EW), religious writer and minister
- Robert Jones Derfel (1824–1905, W), poet and political writer
- Amy Dillwyn (1845–1935, E), novelist and benefactor
- Huw Dixon (born 1958, E), economist and academic
- A. H. Dodd (1891–1975, E), historian
- C. H. Dodd (1884–1973, E), religious writer and theologian
- Rod Duncan (born 1962, E), novelist
- Joe Dunthorne (born 1982, E), novelist and poet
- John Dyer (c. 1699–1758, E), poet

== E ==
- Aled Eames (1921–1996, EW), historian and author
- Marion Eames (1921–2007, EW), novelist and translator
- Jean Earle poet born in Bristol but brought up and lived in Wales
- Steve Eaves (born 1952, W), poet and singer
- David Miall Edwards (1873–1941, EW), writer and theologian
- Hywel Teifi Edwards (1934–2010, EW), historian and academic
- Dic Edwards (living, E), playwright and poet
- Dorothy Edwards (1902–1934, E), novelist
- Fanny Winifred Edwards (1876–1959, W) children's writer and teacher
- Hugh Edwards (1869–1945, E), biographer and politician
- John Edwards (c. 1700–1776, W), poet and translator
- John Edwards (Sion Ceiriog, 1747–1792, W), poet
- Jonathan Edwards (born 1979, E), poet and schoolteacher
- Lewis Edwards (1809–1887, EW), writer, educator and minister
- Owen Morgan Edwards (1858–1920, EW), writer, historian and educator
- Rhian Edwards (living, E), poet
- Roger Edwards (1811–1886, EW), writer, editor and minister
- Thomas Edwards (1652–1721, E), orientalist and cleric
- Thomas Edwards (Caerfallwch, 1779–1858, EW), writer, lexicographer and minister
- Thomas Edwards (Twm o'r Nant, 1739–1810, W), poet and dramatist
- Elen Egryn (Elin Evans, 1807–1876, W), poet
- Einion Offeiriad ("the Priest", died 1356, W), poet and grammarian
- Menna Elfyn (born 1952, W), poet, playwright and editor
- John Elias (1774–1841, W), religious writer and preacher
- Islwyn Ffowc Elis (1924–2004, W), novelist
- David Ellis (1874–1937, E), botanist and academic
- Mark Ellis (born 1953, E), thriller writer
- Richard Ellis (1865–1928, E), bibliographer and librarian
- Robert Ellis (Cynddelw, 1812–1875, W), poet and lexicographer
- Rowland Ellis (1841–1911, E), religious writer and bishop
- Jonathan Elphick (born 1945, E), writer on natural history
- Samuel Ifor Enoch (1914–2001, E), religious writer and academic
- Rhys Goch Eryri (Rhys ab Dafydd, fl. 1385–1448, W), bard
- Benjamin Evans (1740–1821, E), orientalist and cleric
- Beriah Gwynfe Evans (1848–1927, EW), dramatist and politician
- Caradoc Evans (1878–1945, E), fiction writer
- Charles Evans (1918–1995, E), mountaineering writer and surgeon
- Christine Evans (born 1943, E), poet
- Christmas Evans (1766–1838, EW), religious writer and minister
- Christopher Evans (1931–1979, E), writer and psychologist
- Daniel Evans (1792–1846, W), poet
- Daniel Silvan Evans (1818–1903, EW), scholar, lexicographer and cleric
- David John Evans (1884–1965), Presbyterian minister and author
- Donald Evans (born 1940, W), poet
- Edward Evans (1716–1798, EW), poet and translator
- Ellis Evans (1786–1864), author
- Emrys Evans (1891–1966, E), classicist and academic
- Gwynfor Evans (1912–2005, EW), writer and lawyer
- Evan Evans (1731–1789, W), poet, translator and religious writer
- Evan Evans (1804–1886, W), writer and minister
- Hugh Evans (1854–1934, W), writer and publisher
- Ifor Leslie Evans (1897–1952, EW), academic
- John Evans (c. 1680–1730, E), religious writer and divine
- John Evans (1702–1782, E), polemicist and cleric
- John Evans (1768 – c. 1812, E), topographer
- Stuart Evans (1934–1994, E), novelist
- Theophilus Evans (1693–1767, EW), historian
- Thomas Evans (Telynog, 1840–1865, W), poet
- William Evans (died c. 1720, EW), religious writer and minister
- William Evans (died c. 1776, EW), lexicographer and cleric
- William Evans (1883–1968, W), poet and bard
- Albert Evans-Jones (Cynan, 1895–1970, W), poet and dramatist

== F ==
- Myrddin Fardd (John Jones, 1836–1921, W), writer and antiquarian
- Martyn Farr (born 1951, E), writer and cave diver
- Richard Fenton (1746–1821, E), topographer and poet
- Paul Ferris (1929–2018, E), biographer and novelist
- I. D. Ffraid (John Evans, 1814–1875, W), poet
- Peter Finch (born 1947, EW), poet and prose writer
- Catherine Fisher (born 1957, E), writer and broadcaster
- George Fisher (1909–1970, W), dramatist and theatre producer
- Ken Follett (born 1949, E), author
- Dion Fortune (Violet Mary Firth, 1890–1946, E), novelist, writer and occultist
- Dick Francis (1920–2010, E), author and jockey
- Enoch Francis (1688–1740, E), religious writer
- Matthew Francis (born 1956, E), poet and academic
- Dawn French (born 1957, E), writer, comedian and actress
- Simwnt Fychan (c. 1530–1606, W), poet and genealogist

== G ==
- Menna Gallie (1919–1990, E), novelist and translator
- Raymond Garlick (1926–2011, E), poet and editor
- Geoffrey of Monmouth (Gruffudd ap Arthur, c. 1100 – c. 1155, L), chronicler and cleric
- Eirwyn George (1936–2026, ?), poet
- William R. P. George (1912–2006, EW), poet and lawyer
- Gerald of Wales (c. 1146 – c. 1223, L), historian and topographer
- Peter George (Peter Bryant, 1924–1966, E), novelist
- June and Jennifer Gibbons (born 1963, Jennifer died 1993, E), novelists and story writers
- John Gibson (1841–1915, E), writer and journalist
- Annabel Giles (1959–2023, E), novelist and broadcaster
- William Glynne-Jones (1907–1977, E), novelist and broadcaster
- Dic Goodman (1920–2013, W), poet
- Gabriel Goodman (1528–1601, EW), translator and Dean of Westminster
- Godfrey Goodman (1582 or 1583–1656, E), religious writer and bishop
- Geraint Goodwin (1903–1941, E), fiction writer
- Iris Gower (1935–2010, E), novelist
- Clive Granger (1934–2009, E), Nobel Prize-winning economist and academic
- Beatrice Green (1894–1927, EF), labour activist and feminist/socialist writer
- George Griffith (1601–1666, E), religious writer and bishop
- Griffith Griffith (1883–1967, W), translator, hymnist and minister
- Llewelyn Wyn Griffith (1890–1977, E), novelist and linguist
- Ann Griffiths (1776–1805, W), poet and hymnist
- Bryn Griffiths (living, E), poet and writer
- David Griffiths (1792–1863, E), translator and missionary
- J. Gwyn Griffiths (1911–2004, EW), poet and Egyptologist
- Niall Griffiths (born 1966, E), novelist and journalist
- Paul Griffiths (born 1947, E), critic, novelist and librettist
- Paul Griffiths (born 1973, EW), writer, critic and theatre director
- Rees Howell Gronow (1794–1865, E), memoirist
- Paul Groves (born 1947, E), poet and critic
- Gruffudd ab Adda (fl. mid–14th century, W), poet and musician
- Gruffudd Gryg (fl. 1340–80, W), poet
- Elis Gruffydd (1490–1552, W), chronicler and translator
- Owen Gruffydd (1643–1730, W), poet
- R. Geraint Gruffydd (1928–2015, EW), scholar and academic
- William John Gruffydd (1881–1954, W), poet and academic
- Bethan Gwanas (born 1962, W), novelist and children's writer
- Gwenallt (D. Gwenallt Jones, 1899–1968, W), poet and critic
- Gwynn ap Gwilym (1955–2016, W), poet, novelist and translator
- Robert Gwin (fl. 1591, W), religious writer and translator
- Richard Gwyn (living, W), fiction and non-fiction writer and poet
- Tudur ap Gwyn Hagr (fl. second half of 14th century, W), poet
- Cyril Gwynn (1897–1988, E), oral poet
- Elinor Gwynn, poet, winner of the Crown at the 2016 National Eisteddfod of Wales
- John Gwynneth (fl. 1557, EL), religious writer and musician

== H ==
- Tessa Hadley (born 1956, E), novelist and non-fiction writer
- Fred Hando (1888–1970, E), Monmouthshire historian, topographer and educator
- Alan Harris (born 1967, E), playwright and screenwriter
- Howell Harris (Hywel Harris, 1714–1773, W), diarist and preacher
- Joseph Harris (Gomer, 1773–1825, W), poet, writer and minister
- Ann Hatton (1764–1838, E), novelist and poet
- Dewi Havhesp (David Roberts, 1831–1884, W), poet
- Myfanwy Haycock (1913–1963, E), poet and broadcaster
- Anna Haycraft (Alice Thomas Ellis, 1932–2005, E), writer and essayist
- Torey Hayden (born 1951, E), non-fiction writer and academic
- Paul Henry (born 1959, E), poet, singer/songwriter and broadcaster
- Edward Herbert, 1st Baron Herbert of Cherbury (1583–1648, EL), writer and soldier
- George Herbert (1593–1633, E), poet
- William Herbert (c. 1554–1593, EL), writer and politician
- Michael Heseltine (born 1933, E), writer and politician
- Gruffudd Hiraethog (died 1564, W), poet
- Ian Hislop (born 1960, E), satirist and editor
- Hugh Holland (1569–1633, E), poet
- Isaac Daniel Hooson (1880–1948, W), poet
- Deian Hopkin (born 1944, EW), historian and academic
- Bill Hopkins (1928–2011, E), novelist and journalist
- Mererid Hopwood (born 1964, EW), poet
- Frederick William Horner (1854–1933, E), playwright, politician and bankrupt
- Sally El Hosaini (living, E), scriptwriter and film director
- Graham Howells (living, EW), children's writer and illustrator
- Ann Harriet Hughes (Gwyneth Vaughan, 1852–1910, W), novelist
- Ellen Hughes (1867–1927, W), poet, essayist and suffragist
- Griffith Hughes (1707 – c. 1758, E), writer and naturalist
- Hugh Hughes (Y Bardd Coch, 1693–1776, W), poet
- Hugh Hughes (c. 1790–1863, W), writer and painter
- John Ceiriog Hughes (1832–1887, W), poet and folk music collector
- Jonathan Hughes (1721–1805, W), poet
- Rhys Hughes (born 1966, E), absurdist fiction
- Richard Hughes (1900–1976, E), novelist and poet
- Richard Cyril Hughes (1932–2022, W), historian
- Thomas Rowland Hughes (1903–1949, W), novelist, dramatist and poet
- David Russell Hulme (born 1951, E), musicologist and conductor
- Edward Morgan Humphreys (1882–1955, W), novelist and translator
- Emyr Humphreys (1919–1920, EW), novelist and poet
- Humphrey Humphreys (1648–1712, EW), bishop and antiquary
- Arthur ap Huw (fl. 1555–1570, W), translator, patron and cleric
- Emily Huws (born 1942, W), children's writer
- Hywel ab Owain Gwynedd (died 1170, W), poet and military leader
- Siôn ap Hywel (fl. c. 1490–1532, W), poet

== I ==
- Dafydd Ifans (born 1949, W), novelist and translator
- Elisabeth Inglis-Jones (1900–1994, E), novelist and biographer
- Ioan Tegid (John Jones, 1792–1852, W), writer, scholar and cleric
- Iolo Goch (c. 1320–c. 1398, W), poet
- Iorwerth Beli (fl. later 14th c., W), poet
- Norah Isaac (1914–2003, W), writer and educator
- Emrys ap Iwan (Robert Ambrose Jones, 1848–1906, W), critic and writer

== J ==
- Angharad James (1677–1749, W), poet and harpist
- Bill James (James Tucker, 1929–2023, E), novelist
- Christine James (living, W), poet and academic
- Daniel James (Gwyrosydd, 1848–1920, W), poet and hymnist
- Edward James (c. 1569 – c. 1610, W), translator and priest
- Evan James (Euan ap Iago, 1809–1878, W), poet and lyricist
- Henry James (1864–1949, W), religious writer and dean
- Maria James (1793–1868, E), poet
- Siân James (1930–2021, E), novelist
- Marguerite Florence Laura Jarvis (Oliver Sandys, 1886–1964, E), novelist and actress
- David Jenkins (1912–2002, EW), non-fiction writer and librarian
- John Jenkins (Gwili, 1872–1936, W), poet and theologian
- Joseph Jenkins (1818–1898, EW), diarist and poet
- Mike Jenkins (born 1953, E), poet and fiction writer
- Nigel Jenkins (1949–2014, E), poet and non-fiction writer
- Robert Thomas Jenkins (1881–1969, EW), historian and academic
- John Thomas Job (1867–1938, W), hymnist, poet and minister
- Brian John (born 1940, E), novelist and non-fiction writer
- Godfrey John (living, E), poet and essayist
- Griffith John (1831–1912, CE), translator and evangelist
- Alice Gray Jones (1852–1943, W), writer and editor
- Bedwyr Lewis Jones (1933–1992, EW), scholar, critic and linguist
- Bobi Jones (Robert Maynard Jones, 1929–2017, W), writer and academic
- Cynan Jones (born 1975, E), novelist
- D. Gwenallt Jones (1899–1968, W), poet, critic and scholar
- Dafydd Jones (Dewi Dywyll, 1803–1868, W), balladeer
- David Jones (1765–1816, E), religious writer and barrister
- David Jones (1895–1974, E), poet and painter
- Dic Jones (1934–2009, W), poet
- Eifion Jones (1925–2004, E), science writer and marine biologist
- Elwyn Jones (1923–1982, E), television screenwriter and novelist
- Ernest Jones (1879–1958, E), biographer and psychoanalyst
- Glyn Jones (1905–1995, E), novelist, poet and literary historian
- Griffith Jones (1684–1761, EW), religious writer and promoter of literacy
- Gwilym R. Jones (1903–1993, W), editor and poet
- Gwyn Jones (1907–1999, E), novelist and translator
- Harri Pritchard Jones (1933–2015, EW), poet, critic and psychiatrist
- Harry Longueville Jones (1806–1870, E), archaeologist and schools inspector
- Idwal Jones (1887–1964, E), novelist and non-fiction writer
- Jack Jones (1884–1970, E), novelist
- Jack Jones (born 1992, E), poet and singer
- John Jones (Jac Glan-y-gors, 1766–1821, W), satirical poet and pamphleteer
- John Chris Jones (1927–2022, E), designer and writer on design
- John Hugh Jones (1843–1910, W), translator and priest
- John Robert Jones (1911–1970, EW), philosopher
- Jonah Jones (1919–2004, E), writer and sculptor
- Lewis Jones (1836–1904, W), writer and settler in Patagonia
- Lewis Jones (1897–1939, EW), writer and left-wing activist
- Mary Vaughan Jones (1918–1983, W), children's writer and educator
- Maurice Jones (1863–1957, W), bard, cleric and academic
- Owen Jones (1741–1814, EW), antiquary
- Owen Jones (1838–1866), school teacher and writer
- Owen Wynne Jones (Glasynys, 1828–1870, W), writer, schoolteacher and cleric
- Patrick Jones (born 1965, E), poet and playwright
- Steve Jones (born 1944, E), science writer and geneticist
- T. Gwynn Jones (1871–1949, EW), poet, novelist and translator
- T. James Jones (born 1934, W), poet and dramatist
- T. Llew Jones (1915–2009, W), poet and children's writer
- Terry Jones (1942–2020, E), writer, screenwriter and film-maker
- Thomas Jones (1756–1820, EW), writer, poet and minister
- William Jones (1746–1794, E), philologist

== K ==
- Charles William King (1818–1888, E), antiquary and gemstone expert
- Jemma L. King, poet, literary critic
- Stephen Knight (born 1960, E), poet and theatre director
- Morris Kyffin (c. 1555–1598, EL), poet and soldier

== L ==
- Nikita Lalwani (born 1973, E), novelist
- David Langford (born 1953, E), sci-fi writer
- Jon Latimer (born 1964, E), historian
- T. E. Lawrence (1888–1935, E), author and diplomat
- Deke Leonard (1944–2017, E), autobiographer and rock musician
- Thomas Levi (1825–1916, W), writer, politician and minister
- Alun Lewis (1915–1944, E), poet
- C. S. Lewis (1898–1963, E), novelist, poet and religious writer (born in Belfast of Welsh descent)
- D. B. Wyndham Lewis (Timothy Shy, 1891–1969, E), humorous writer and biographer
- Hywel Lewis (1910–1992, E), theologian and philosopher
- David Lewis (1682–1760, E), poet
- Eiluned Lewis (1900–1979, E), novelist and poet
- Gwyneth Lewis (born 1959, EW), poet
- Henry Lewis (1889–1968, W), scholar and academic
- Robyn Léwis (1929–2019, W), writer and politician
- Roger Lewis (born 1960, E), biographer and academic
- Saunders Lewis (1893–1985, W), writer and politician
- Simon Lewis (born 1971, E), novelist and screenwriter
- Gary Ley (born 1956, E), novelist
- Edward Lhuyd (Edward Llwyd, 1660–1709, ELW), naturalist and antiquary
- David Llewellyn (born 1978, E), novelist
- Richard Llewellyn (1907–1983, E), novelist
- Roddy Llewellyn (born 1947, E), gardening writer and TV presenter
- David Lloyd (1597–1663, E), poet and cleric
- Henry Lloyd (c. 1718–1783, E), military writer and army officer
- William Lloyd, political writer and non-juring bishop
- Edward Lhuyd (1660–1709, ELW), naturalist, linguist and antiquary
- Alan Llwyd (Alan Lloyd Roberts, born 1948, W), poet, critic and editor
- Dafydd Llwyd ap Llywelyn ap Gruffudd (fl. 1400–1490, W), poet
- Humphrey Llwyd (1527–1568, ELW), antiquary, cartographer and politician
- Martha Llwyd (1766–1845, W), poet and hymnist
- Morgan Llwyd (1619–1659, W), poet, prose writer and preacher
- Richard Llwyd (1752–1835, E), poet and genealogist
- Llywarch ap Llywelyn (Prydydd y Moch, fl. 1173–1220, W), poet
- Llywarch Hen (c. 534 – c. 608, W), poet and prince
- Llywelyn Goch ap Meurig Hen (fl. c. 1350–1390, W), court poet
- Robin Llywelyn (born 1958, EW), novelist
- Llywelyn Siôn (1540 – c. 1615, W), poet
- Bob Lock (born 1949, E), sci-fi and fantasy novelist
- Michael Lort (1725–1790, E), antiquary and cleric
- Richard Lucas (1648/1649–1715, E), religious writer and cleric
- Elinor Lyon (1921–2008, E), children's writer

== M ==
- Tom Macdonald (1900–1980, EW), novelist and historical writer
- Arthur Machen (1863–1947, E), horror/fantasy writer and literary critic
- John Maddox (1925–2009, E), science writer, editor and biologist
- Oriel Malet (Lady Auriel Rosemary Malet Vaughan, 1923–2014, E), novelist and biographer
- Ruth Manning-Sanders (1895–1988, E), poet and children's writer
- Howard Marks (1945–2016, E), writer and drug smuggler
- Ursula Masson (1945–2008, E), writer and academic
- Dafydd Llwyd Mathau (17th century, W), poet and minstrel
- Roland Mathias (1915–2007, E), poet, fiction writer and critic
- Sean Mathias (born 1956, E), writer and theatre and film director
- Cynddelw Brydydd Mawr (fl. 1155–1200, W), court poet
- Andrew McNeillie (born 1946, E), poet and editor
- Gwerful Mechain (Walter Davies, fl. 1460–1502, W), poet
- Nia Medi (living, W), novelist and actress
- Huw Menai (1886–1961, E), poet
- Susan Mendus (born 1951, E), political philosopher
- Christopher Meredith (born 1954, EW), poet and novelist
- Catherine Merriman (living, E), fiction writer
- Wiliam Midleton (c. 1550–1596, W), poet and adventurer
- Dillwyn Miles (1915–2007, E), writer and teacher
- Dorothy Miles (1931–1993, E, sl) poet and activist for the deaf
- Gareth Miles (living, W), writer and translator
- Robert Minhinnick (born 1952, E), poet, essayist and novelist
- Jon Mitchell (born 1974, E), journalist and author
- Moelona (Elizabeth Mary Jones, 1877–1953, W), novelist, children's writer and translator
- Lewys Môn (fl. 1485–1527, W), poet
- Christopher Monger (born 1950, E), screenwriter and director
- Ann Moray (1909–1981, E), novelist and singer
- Barry Morgan (born 1947, E), writer and Anglican Archbishop of Wales
- Derec Llwyd Morgan (born 1943, EW), academic
- Dylan Morgan (1946–2011, E), writer, mathematician and hypnotherapist
- Elaine Morgan (1920–2013, EW), playwright and non-fiction writer
- Elena Puw Morgan (1900–1973, W), novelist and children's writer
- Eluned Morgan (1870–1938, W), non-fiction writer in Patagonia
- Evan Morgan, 2nd Viscount Tredegar (1893–1949), poet and author
- Gwenllian Morgan (1852–1939, E), antiquary and mayor
- John Morgan (John Morgan Matchin, 1688–1733 or 1734, W), poet and cleric
- Kenneth O. Morgan (born 1934, E), historian and academic
- Mihangel Morgan (born 1955, W), poet and fiction writer
- Prys Morgan (born 1937, E), historian
- Richard Williams Morgan (Môr Meirion, c. 1815–1889, EW), religious writer and priest
- Stuart Morgan (1948–2002, E), art critic
- T. J. Morgan (1907–1986, W), scholar and academic writer
- William Morgan (1545–1604, W), Bible translator and bishop
- Lewys Morgannwg (fl. 1520–65, W), poet
- Iolo Morganwg (1747–1826, EW), antiquarian, poet and literary forger
- Michael Moritz (born 1954, E), writer and venture capitalist
- Brian Morris (1930–2001, E), poet and critic
- Jan Morris (James Morris, 1926–2020, E), historian, author and travel writer
- Lewis Morris (Llewelyn Ddu o Fôn, 1701–1765, EW), antiquary and poet
- Richard Morris (1703–1779, W), folklorist
- Sharon Morris (living, E), poet and lecturer
- John Morris-Jones (1864–1929, W), poet and grammarian
- Thomas Morris (born 1985, E), writer and editor
- Morus Dwyfech (fl. c. 1523–1590, W), poet and domestic bard
- Penelope Mortimer (1918–1999, E), novelist and biographer
- Huw Morus (Eos Ceiriog, i. e. "the nightingale of Ceiriog", 1622–1709, W), poet
- Twm Morys (born 1961, EW), poet and musician
- Wendy Mulford (born 1941, E), poet and feminist
- Nicholas Murray (living, E), biographer

== N ==
- Dafydd Nanconwy (17th century, W), poet
- Dafydd Nanmor (fl. 1450–1490, W), poet
- Rhys Nanmor (fl. 1480–1513, W), poet
- Twm o'r Nant (Thomas Edwards, 1739–1810, W), dramatist and poet
- Dewi Nantbrân (fl. 18th century, W), religious writer and Franciscan friar
- Terry Nation (1930–1997, E), TV scriptwriter
- Nennius (fl. 9th century, L), chronicler and monk
- Mary Edith Nepean (1876–1960, E), romantic novelist
- Thomas Evan Nicholas (Niclas y Glais, 1879–1971, W), poet, preacher and radical
- Mavis Nicholson (1930–2022, E), writer and TV broadcaster
- Dafydd Nicolas (c.1705–1774, W), poet
- Jenny Nimmo (born 1944, E), children's author and novelist
- Leslie Norris (1921–2006, E), poet and short story writer

== O ==
- Pixie O'Harris (Rhona Olive Harris, 1903–1991, E), writer and artist
- Oliver Onions (1873–1961, E), fiction writer
- John Ormond (1923–1990, E), poet and film-maker
- Owain Owain (1929–1993, W), fiction writer and poet
- Robin Llwyd ab Owain (born 1959, W), poet and promoter of Welsh
- Aneurin Owen (1792–1851, EW), historian and scholar
- Daniel Owen (1836–1895, W), novelist
- David Owen (Dewi Wyn o Eifion, 1784–1841, W), poet and farmer
- David Owen (Brutus, 1796–1866, W), satirist and preacher
- Gary Owen (born 1972, E), playwright
- George Owen of Henllys (1552–1613, E), antiquarian and naturalist
- Geraint Lloyd Owen (living, W), poet and schoolteacher
- Gerallt Lloyd Owen (1944–2014, W), poet
- Goronwy Owen (1723–1769, W), poet
- John Owen (1564–1622, L), writer of epigrams
- John Owen (Owain Alaw Pencerdd, 1821–1883, EW), poet and musician
- Robert Owen (1771–1858, E), political writer and social reformer
- William David Owen (1874–1925, W), novelist

== P ==
- William Williams Pantycelyn (1717–1791, EW), hymnist, poet and writer
- Molly Parkin (born 1932, E), novelist and painter
- Ian Parrott (1916–2012, E), music writer and composer
- Gwenlyn Parry (1932–1991, W), playwright and screenwriter
- John Parry (Bardd Alaw, 1776–1851, E), songwriter
- John Parry (1812–1874, W), encyclopedist
- John Humffreys Parry (1786–1825, EW), antiquary and barrister
- R. Williams Parry (1884–1956, W), poet and schoolteacher
- Richard Parry (1560–1623, EW), Bible translator
- Robert Parry (1540–1612, E), poet, romancier and translator
- Sarah Winifred Parry (1870–1953, W), fiction writer
- Thomas Parry (1904–1985, W), writer and academic
- Amy Parry-Williams (1910–1988, W), writer and singer
- T. H. Parry-Williams (1887–1975, EW), poet, writer and academic
- Will Paynter (1903–1984, E), writer, miner and trade union leader
- Allison Pearson (born 1960, E), journalist and novelist
- Nathan Penlington (living, E), writer, poet and magician
- Tudur Penllyn (fl. 1420–90, W), poet
- Jessie Penn-Lewis (1861–1927, E), religious writer and evangelist
- Thomas Pennant (1726–1798, E), naturalist, traveller and antiquary
- Meirion Pennar (1944–2010, EW), poet and academic
- Anne Penny (1729–1784, E), poet
- James Perrot (1571–1636, E), writer and politician
- Henry Perry (1560/61–1617, EW), linguistic scholar and cleric
- Dewi Zephaniah Phillips (1934–2006, EW), religious philosopher
- Eluned Phillips (1914–2009, EW), bard and memoirist
- Morgan Phillips (1902–1963, E), political writer and General Secretary of the Labour Party
- Siân Phillips (born 1933, E), writer, actress and singer
- Thomas Phillips (1801–1867, E), non-fiction writer and local politician
- Siôn Phylip (1543–1620, W), poet
- John Pook (born 1942, E), poet
- David Powel (c. 1549/52–1598, E), antiquary and translator
- Arthur E. Powell (1882–1969, E), theosophist
- Gabriel Powell (1576–1611, E), religious polemicist and cleric
- John Cowper Powys (1872–1963, E), novelist and philosopher
- Angharad Price (living, W), novelist and academic
- Richard Price (1723–1791, E), moral philosopher, preacher and pamphleteer
- Thomas Price (Carnhuanawc, 1787–1848, EW), historian and man of letters
- Caradog Prichard (1904–1980, W), novelist
- Rhys Prichard (Yr Hen Ficer – The Old Vicar, 1579–1644, W), poet and cleric
- Sir John Prise (c. 1502–1555, ELW), scholar and notary public
- Malcolm Pryce (born 1960, E), novelist
- Myfanwy Pryce (1890–1976, E), fiction writer
- Edmund Prys (Edmwnd Prys, 1544–1623, W), poet and cleric
- Tomos Prys (c. 1564–1634, W), poet, sailor and soldier
- Sheenagh Pugh (born 1950, E), poet, novelist and translator
- William Owen Pughe (1759–1835, EW), antiquary, grammarian and lexicographer
- Gwilym Puw (William Pugh, c. 1618 – c. 1689, W), poet and soldier

== R ==
- Gwynedd Rae (1892–1977, E), children's writer
- Allen Raine (1836–1908, EW), novelist
- Helen Raynor (born 1972, E), scriptwriter
- Robert Recorde (c. 1512–1558, E), mathematician
- Evan Rees (Dyfed, 1850–1923, W), poet and minister
- Goronwy Rees (1909–1979, E), writer and journalist
- Matt Rees (living, E), novelist and foreign correspondent
- T. Ifor Rees (1890–1977, EW), travel writer, translator and diplomat
- Thomas Rees (1815–1885, EW), historian and minister
- William Rees (Gwilym Hiraethog, 1802–1883, W), novelist and poet
- Deryn Rees-Jones (living, E), poet
- Alastair Reynolds (born 1966, E), sci-fi writer
- Llywarch Reynolds (1843–1916, EW), scholar and solicitor
- Oliver Reynolds (born 1957, E), poet and critic
- Edward Prosser Rhys (1901–1945, W), poet and publisher
- Ernest Rhys (1859–1946, E), essayist, poet and editor
- Maredudd ap Rhys (died early 1480s, W), poet
- Morgan Rhys (1716–1779, W), hymnist
- Siôn Dafydd Rhys (1534 – c. 1609, LW), grammarian and physician
- Henry Rice (1585 or 1586–1651, E), writer and courtier
- Alun Richards (1929–2004, E), novelist and schoolteacher
- Brinley Richards (Brinli, 1904–1981, W), poet
- David Richards (Dafydd Ionawr, 1751–1827, W), poet
- Frank Richards (British Army soldier), (1883-1961, E), soldier and writer.
- Thomas Richards (1878–1962, EW), historian and memoirist
- Thomas Richards of Coychurch (c. 1710–1790, EW), lexicographer, translator and cleric
- Gruffydd Robert (before 1532 – after 1598, W), humanist and grammarian
- Adam Roberts (born 1965, E), sci-fi- novelist and critic
- Brynley F. Roberts (1931–2023, EW), scholar and lexicographer
- Eigra Lewis Roberts (born 1939, EW), playwright, novelist and children's writer
- Eleazar Roberts (1825–1912, EW), writer, translator and musician
- Emrys Roberts (1929–2012, W), poet
- Evan Roberts (1909–1991, W), botanist and conservationist
- Kate Roberts (1891–1985, W), fiction writer
- Richard Owain Roberts (born 1982, EW), fiction writer
- Samuel Roberts (1800–1885, EW), writer on politics and economics
- William Owen Roberts (born 1960, W), novelist, dramatist and scriptwriter
- Byron Rogers (born 1942, E), biographer and essayist
- Henry Rogers (1803–1877, E), man of letters and minister
- Jon Ronson (born 1967, E), writer, film-maker and broadcaster
- Daniel Rowland (c. 1711–1790, W), religious writer and Methodist evangelist
- Dafydd Rowlands (1931–2001, W), writer, bard and minister
- Jane Helen Rowlands (Helen o Fôn, 1891–1955, EFW), scholar, linguist and evangelist
- John Rowlands (1938–2015, W), novelist and academic
- Mark Rowlands (born 1962, E), writer and philosopher
- William Rowlands (Gwylym Lleyn, 1802–1865, EW), religious writer, bibliographer and minister
- Roger Royle (born 1939, E), writer and broadcaster
- Bernice Rubens (1928–2004, E), novelist
- Berta Ruck (1878–1978, E), novelist and memoirist
- Julian E. Ruck, (born 1956), novelist

== S ==
- William Salesbury or Salusbury (c. 1520 – c. 1584, EW), scholar and translator
- Enoch Salisbury (1819–1890, E), writer and barrister
- Sir John Salusbury (1567–1612, EW), poet and politician
- John Salusbury (1707–1762, E), diarist and explorer
- Sir Thomas Salusbury (1612–1643, E), poet and politician
- Rhian Samuel (born 1944, E), writer on music and composer
- Edward Samuel (1674 – c. 1748, W), cleric, poet and translator
- David Samwell (Dafydd Ddu Feddyg, 1751–1798, EW), poet and naval surgeon
- Jimmy Sangster (1927–2011, E), screenwriter and filmmaker
- Erasmus Saunders (1670–1724, E), religious writer and cleric
- Roy Saunders (fl. 1950s–1970s, E), writer and broadcaster
- William Saunders (1806–1851, W), poet and translator
- Fred Secombe (1918–2016, E), memoirist and cleric
- Carole Seymour-Jones (1943–2015, E), biographer and writer of educational books
- Owen Sheers (born 1974, E), poet, playwright and TV presenter
- Norena Shopland author, historian in LGBTQ+ history and Welsh history
- Dorothy Simpson (1933–2020, E), crime novelist
- Iain Sinclair (born 1943, E), writer and film-maker
- Dai Smith (born 1945, E), cultural historian, academic and broadcaster
- Andrew Phillip Smith (born 1966, E), religious writer and historian
- Walter Shaw Sparrow (1862–1940, E), writer on arts
- Howard Spring (1889–1965, E), novelist
- Neil Spring (born 1981, E), novelist
- Henry Morton Stanley (1841–1904, E), travel writer and explorer
- Peter Stead (born 1943, E), writer, historian and broadcaster
- Meic Stephens (1938–2018, E), poet, translator and editor
- Thomas Stephens (1821–1875, EW), historian and critic
- Mari Strachan (born 1945, E), novelist
- Frank Showell Styles (1908–2005, E), novelist and mountaineer
- Jennifer Sullivan (born 1945, E), children's novelist and critic
- Ieuan ap Hywel Swrdwal (c. 1430 – c. 1480, EW), poet
- Hywel Swrdwal (fl. 1430–1475, W), poet
- Dafydd Llwyd Sybylltir (17th century, W), poet
- Arthur Symons (1865–1945, E), poet and critic

== T ==
- Talhaearn Tad Awen (fl. mid-6th c., B) poet writing in Sub-Roman period
- Talhaiarn (John Jones, 1810–1869, W), poet and architect
- Taliesin (c. 534 – c. 599, B), poet writing in Sub-Roman period
- Ioan Tegid (John Jones, 1792–1852, EW), poet, scholar and cleric
- Jake Thackray (1938–2002, E), poet and singer-songwriter
- Caitlin Thomas (1913–1994, E), memoirist
- Craig Thomas (1942–2011, E), novelist
- David Thomas (Dewi Hefin, 1828–1909, W), poet and schoolteacher
- David Thomas (1880–1967), educationalist, author and North Wales Labour Party pioneer
- Dylan Thomas (1914–1953, E), poet
- Ebenezer Thomas (Eben Fardd, 1802–1863, W), poet
- Gwyn Thomas (1913–1981, E), novelist
- Gwyn Thomas (1936–2016, W), poet and academic
- Leslie Thomas (1931–2014, E), novelist
- Louie Myfanwy Thomas (Jane Ann Jones, 1908–1968, W), novelist and radio dramatist
- Nathaniel Thomas (1730 – post–1768, E), writer and editor
- Ned Thomas (born 1936, EW), critic and editor
- R. S. Thomas (1913–2000, EW), poet
- Robert Thomas (Ap Vychan, 1809–1880, W), poet and minister
- Thomas Llewellyn Thomas (1840–1897, ELW), scholar, poet and cleric
- William Thomas (1832–1878, EW), poet and preacher
- William Thomas (Gwilym Marles, 1834–1879, W), poet and minister
- Hester Thrale (Hester Lynch Salusbury, Hester Piozzi, 1740–1821, E), diarist
- Lily Tobias (1887–1984, E), novelist, playwright and political activist
- Angharad Tomos (born 1958, W), writer and activist
- Catherine Tregenna (living, E), playwright and scriptwriter
- Rachel Trezise (born 1978, E), novelist and non-fiction writer
- Barbara Margaret Trimble (Margaret Blake, B. M. Gill, 1921–1995, E), thriller writer
- John Tripp (1927–1986, E), poet
- Josiah Tucker (1713–1799, E), economist, political writer and cleric
- Mike Tucker (living, E), novelist and TV special effects expert
- Tudur Aled (c. 1465–1526, W), poet

== V ==
- Jenny Valentine (born 1970, E), children's writer
- Henry Vaughan (1621–1695, E), poet
- Hilda Vaughan (1892–1985, E), fiction writer
- Robert Vaughan (c. 1592–1667, EW), historian and translator
- Thomas Vaughan (1621–1666, E), philosopher
- William Vaughan (c. 1575–1641, EL), moral and political writer
- Wynford Vaughan-Thomas (1908–1987, E), writer and broadcaster

== W ==
- Chris Walley (born 1954, E), novelist and geologist
- Jo Walton (born 1964, E), fantasy and science fiction writer
- John Powell Ward (born 1937, E), poet and academic
- Anna Laetitia Waring (1823–1910, E), poet and hymnist
- Elijah Waring (1788–1857, E), writer
- Sarah Waters (born 1966, E), novelist
- Elizabeth Watkin-Jones (1887–1966, W), children's writer
- Vernon Watkins (1906–1967, E), poet and translator
- Harri Webb (1920–1994, E), poet and journalist
- Ronald Welch (Ronald Oliver Felton, 1909–1982, E), novelist and children's writer
- Edward Ross Wharton (1844–1896, E), classical scholar, etymologist and lexicographer
- Jon Manchip White (1924–2013, E), writer of fiction and non-fiction
- Urien Wiliam (1929–2006, W), novelist, dramatist and scholar
- Vaughan Wilkins (1890–1959, E), historical novelist and journalist
- Anna Williams (1706–1783, E), poet and companion to Samuel Johnson
- Charles Hanbury Williams (1708–1759, E), satirist, diplomat and politician
- Colin H. Williams (born 1950, E), academic
- David Williams (1926–2003, E), crime writer and advertising executive
- David Gwyn Williams (1904–1990, EW), poet, novelist and academic
- David John Williams (1885–1970, W), fiction writer, memoirist and nationalist
- Edward Williams (1750–1813, E), theological writer and minister
- Eliseus Williams (Eifion Wyn, 1867–1926, W), poet and bard
- Emlyn Williams (1905–1987, E), dramatist and actor
- Gareth F. Williams (1955–2016, W), children's writer
- Glanmor Williams (1920–2005, EW), historian
- Griffith Williams (Gutyn Peris, 1769–1838, W), poet
- Gwyn A. Williams (1925–1995, E), historian
- Gwynne Williams (born 1937, W), poet, prose writer and translator
- Ifor Williams (1881–1965, EW), scholar and linguist
- Iolo Williams (born 1962, EW), nature writer and television presenter
- Isaac Williams (1802–1865, EL), poet and religious writer
- J. Lloyd Williams (1854–1945, EW), writer, botanist and musician
- Jane Williams (Ysgafell, 1806–1885, EW), poet and essayist
- John Williams (1792–1858, E), scholar, educator and cleric
- John Williams (Ab Ithel, 1811–1862, EW), antiquary and cleric
- John Francon Williams FRGS (1854–1911, E), editor, journalist and writer
- John Ellis Williams (1924–2008, EW), fiction writer and autobiographer
- John James Williams (1869–1954, W), poet
- John Owen Williams (Pedrog, 1853–1932, W), poet and minister
- John Richard Williams (J. R. Tryfanwy, 1867–1924, W), poet
- Jonathan Williams (c. 1752–1829, E), local historian, cleric and schoolmaster
- Maria Jane Williams (c. 1795–1873, EW), folklorist and musician
- Morris Williams (Nicander, 1809–1874, EW), bard and cleric
- Moses Williams (1685–1742, EW), antiquary
- Nathaniel Williams (1656 or 1657 – c. 1679, E), writer
- Owen Williams (Owen Gwyrfai, 1790–1874, W), antiquary and lexicographer
- Peter Bailey Williams (1763–1836, E), antiquary and cleric
- Raymond Williams (1921–1988, E), novelist, critic and academic
- Rheinallt Nantlais Williams (1911–1993, E), religious writer and academic
- Rhydwen Williams (1916–1997, W), poet, novelist and minister
- Richard Bryn Williams (1902–1981, W), poet, playwright and historian (Patagonia)
- Richard Hughes Williams (Dic Tryfan, 1878–1919, W), fiction writer and slate quarrier
- Robert Williams (Robert ap Gwilym Ddu, 1766–1850, W), poet and bard
- Robert Williams (Trebor Mai, 1830–1877, W), poet
- Robert Dewi Williams (1870–1955, W), writer, schoolteacher and minister
- Roger Williams (born 1974, EW), playwright
- Rowan Williams (born 1950, E), writer, poet and Archbishop of Canterbury
- Roland Williams, (Hwfa Môn, 1823–1905, W), poet and cleric
- T. Marchant Williams (1845–1914, E), writer and politician
- W. Llewelyn Williams (1867–1922, EW), writer and politician
- Waldo Williams (1904–1971, EW), poet and schoolteacher
- Watkin Hezekiah Williams (Watcyn Wyn, 1844–1905, W), poet and schoolmaster
- William Williams (Pantycelyn, 1717–1791, EW), hymnist, poet and prose writer
- William Williams (Gwilym Ddu o Arfon, 1739–1817, EW), antiquary and poet
- William Williams (Gwilym Caledfryn, 1801–1869, W), poet, critic and minister
- William Williams (Carw Coch, 1808–1872, W), man of letters and bard
- William Williams (Creuddynfab, 1814–1869, W), poet and critic
- William Williams (Crwys, 1875–1968, EW), poet
- Clough Williams-Ellis (1883–1978, E), writer and architect
- Eirug Wyn (1950–2004, W), satirical novelist
- Hedd Wyn (Ellis Humphrey Evans, 1887–1917, W), poet and First World War victim
- Ellis Wynne (1671–1734, W), writer and cleric
- John Wynne (c. 1665/1667–1743, E), writer and bishop

== Y ==
- Paula Yates, (1959–2000, E), non-fiction writer and scriptwriter
- Philip Yorke (1743–1804, E), antiquary

== Works by non-Welsh writers set mainly in Wales ==
- Lloyd Alexander – The Book of Three (children's fantasy novel, 1964)
- Mabel Esther Allan – Catrin in Wales (YA novel, 1960)
- Kingsley Amis – That Uncertain Feeling (comic novel, 1955)
- János Arany – A walesi bárdok (The Bards of Wales, ballad, 1857)
- Lindsay Ashford – Death Studies (novel, 2006)
- Trezza Azzopardi – The Hiding Place (novel, 2000)
- Nina Bawden – Carrie's War (children's novel, 1973)
- R. D. Blackmore – The Maid of Sker (1872)
- Nancy Bond – A String in the Harp (children's fantasy novel, 1976)
- George Borrow – Wild Wales (travelogue, 1862)
- Eleanor Cameron – Time and Mr. Bass (children's science fiction, 1967)
- Bruce Chatwin – On the Black Hill (novel, 1982)
- Kevin Crossley-Holland – The Seeing Stone (YA historical novel, 2000)
- Peter Ho Davies – The Welsh Girl (novel, 2007)
- R. F. Delderfield – Come Home, Charlie, and Face Them (novel, 1969)
- Susan Fletcher – Eve Green (novel, 2004)
- Alan Garner – The Owl Service (YA fantasy novel, 1967)
- Niall Griffiths – Grits (novel, 2000)
- Traci Harding – Tablet of Destinies (historical novel, 2001)
- Susan Howatch – The Wheel of Fortune (novel, 1984)
- Susanna Kearsley – Named of the Dragon (novel, 1998)
- Mercedes Lackey – Home from the Sea (novel, 2012)
- Stephen R. Lawhead – Hood (novel, 2006)
- Simon Maginn – Sheep (novel, 1994)
- Grace McCleen – The Land of Decoration (novel, 2012)
- Jenny Nimmo – The Magician Trilogy (novels, 1986–1989)
- Edith Pargeter – The Brothers of Gwyneth (novel, 1989)
- Thomas Love Peacock – Headlong Hall (satirical novel, 1816)
- Sharon Kay Penman – Here Be Dragons (historical novel, 1985)
- Ellis Peters – The Summer of the Danes (mystery novel, 1991)
- Barry Pilton – The Valley (humorous novel, 2005)
- Malcolm Pryce – Aberystwyth Mon Amour (first in a detective novel series, 2001)
- Philip Pullman – The Broken Bridge (YA novel, 1990)
- Janet Quin-Harkin (as Rhys Bowen) – Evans Above (first in a mystery novel series, 1998)
- Ransom Riggs – Miss Peregrine's Home for Peculiar Children (children's fantasy novel, 2011)
- Martha Rofheart – Fortune Made His Sword (historical novel, 1972)
- William Shakespeare – Henry IV Part 1 (history play, pre-1597)
- Catherine Sinclair – Sketches and Short Stories of Wales and the Welsh (1860)
- Mary Stewart – The Crystal Cave (first in the Merlin Trilogy, 1970)
- Antal Szerb – A Pendragon legenda (The Pendragon Legend, comic historical novel, 1934)
- Russell Thorndike – The Amazing Quest of Doctor Syn (sixth in a detective-novel series, 1939)
- Anthony Trollope – Cousin Henry (novel, 1879)
- Evangeline Walton – The Virgin and the Swine (retelling of the Mabinogi, 1934)
- Jo Walton – Among Others (fantasy novel, 2011)
- Theodore Watts-Dunton – Aylwin (novel, 1898)

== See also ==
- List of Welsh language authors
- List of Welsh language poets (6th century to c.1600)
- List of Welsh women writers
- Welsh-language literature
- Welsh literature in English
- Category:Welsh writers
