= List of Welsh women writers =

This is a list of women writers who were born in Wales or whose writings are closely associated with that country.

== A ==
- Jane Aaron (born 1951), literature scholar, researcher and non-fiction writer
- Jane Arden (1927–1982), film director, actress, screenwriter, playwright and poet
- Tiffany Atkinson (born 1972), poet, educator
- Trezza Azzopardi (born 1961), novelist and short story writer: The Hiding Place

== B ==
- Delyth Badder, folklorist, writer and the world's first Welsh-speaking consultant paediatric and perinatal pathologist
- Mary Balogh (born 1944), Welsh-Canadian historical novelist
- Rachel Barrett (1874–1953), suffragette and newspaper editor
- Anne Beale (1816–1900), popular novelist, poet and children's writer
- Anna Maria Bennett (c. 1750–1808), novelist
- Ruth Bidgood (1922–2022), poet
- Emily Rose Bleby (1849-1917), non-fiction writer and temperance activist
- Natasha Bowen, Nigerian Welsh novelist
- Jane Brereton (1685–1740), poet and contributor to The Gentleman's Magazine
- Rhoda Broughton (1840–1920), novelist and short story writer
- Fanny Bulkeley-Owen (1845–1927), historian and author

== C ==
- Catrin ferch Gruffudd ap Hywel (fl. 1555), poet
- Brenda Chamberlain (1912–1971), artist and poet
- Grace Coddington (born 1941), fashion writer, director of Vogue, memoirist
- Gillian Clarke (born 1937), poet, playwright, translator and broadcaster
- Hafina Clwyd (1936–2011), educator and journalist
- Jasmine Cresswell (born 1941), novelist

== D ==
- Fflur Dafydd (born 1978), novelist, playwright, poet and singer, in Welsh and English
- Catherine Glyn Davies (1926–2007), historian and translator
- Deborah Kay Davies, contemporary poet, novelist and educator
- Margaret Davies (fl. 1700s), poet and scribe
- Mary Davies (1846–1882), poet
- Amy Dillwyn (1845–1935), novelist and industrialist

== E ==
- Dorothy Edwards (1903–1934), fiction writer
- Fanny Winifred Edwards (1876–1959), children's author, dramatist and schoolteacher
- Rhian Edwards (active from 2000s), poet
- Sally El Hosaini (born 1976), British-Egyptian film director and screenwriter
- Elen Egryn (1807–1897), Welsh-language poet
- Menna Elfyn (born 1952), Welsh-language poet, playwright, columnist and editor
- Christine Evans (born 1943), poet
- Margiad Evans (1909–1958), poet and novelist

== F ==
- Catherine Fisher (born 1957), novelist, poet and broadcaster

== G ==
- Menna Gallie (1919–1990), novelist and translator
- Isabella Gifford (1825–1891), marine botanist
- Annabel Giles (1959–2023), broadcaster, novelist and actress
- Beatrice Green (1894–1927), labour activist and feminist/socialist writer
- Ann Griffiths (1776–1805), Welsh-language poet and hymn writer
- Bethan Gwanas, pen name of Bethan Evans (born 1962), Welsh-language novelist and children's writer

== H ==
- Ann Hatton (1764–1838), (Ann of Swansea) English-language novelist
- Myfanwy Haycock (1913–1963), poet, artist and broadcaster
- Felicia Hemans (1793–1835), English-born Welsh poet writing in English
- Ann Harriet Hughes (1852–1910), Welsh-language novelist and poet
- Ellen Hughes (1867–1927), Welsh-language writer, poet and suffragist
- Emily Huws (born 1942), Welsh-language children's writer

== I ==
- Elisabeth Inglis-Jones (1900–1994), novelist
- Norah Isaac (1915–2003), Welsh-language short story writer, playwright and travel writer

== J ==
- Maria James (1793–1868), Welsh-born American poet
- Alice Gray Jones (1852–1943), poet, editor
- Margaret Jones (1842–1902), travel writer
- Mary Vaughan Jones (1918–1983), children's writer and teacher
- Sally Roberts Jones (born 1935), poet and biographer

== L ==
- Eiluned Lewis (1900–1979), novelist, poet and journalist
- Gwyneth Lewis (born 1959), Welsh-language poet, national poet of Wales, also in English
- Martha Llwyd (1766–1845), poet and hymnist

== M ==
- Ruth Manning-Sanders (1886–1988), poet and children's writer
- Ursula Masson (1945–2008), educator, literature researcher and non-fiction writer
- Gwerful Mechain (15th century), Welsh-language poet
- Nia Medi, since 2005, Welsh-language novelist and actress
- Dorothy Miles (1931–1993), poet, in English and sign language
- Moelona, pen name of Elizabeth Mary Jones (1877–1953), Welsh-language novelist, children's writer and translator
- Jan Morris (born James Morris, 1926–2020), Welsh historian and travel writer
- Ann Moray (1909–1981), novelist, short story writer and singer
- Elaine Morgan (1920–2013), non-fiction writer on anthropology, playwright and columnist
- Elena Puw Morgan (1900–1973), Welsh-language novelist and children's writer
- Elizabeth Morgan (born 1930), non-fiction writer
- Eluned Morgan (1870–1938), Welsh-language author from Patagonia, travel writer and non-fiction writer
- Gwenllian Elizabeth Fanny Morgan (1852–1939), non-fiction writer and mayor
- Penelope Mortimer (1918–1999), journalist, biographer and novelist
- Wendy Mulford (born 1941), poet and feminist

== N ==
- Mary Edith Nepean (1876–1960), romantic novelist

== O ==
- Pixie O'Harris (1903–1991), Welsh-born Australian artist, poet, autobiographer and illustrator

== P ==
- Sarah Winifred Parry (1870–1953) fiction writer
- Amy Parry-Williams (1910–1988), singer and writer
- Jessie Penn-Lewis (1861–1927), evangelist, religious writer and magazine publisher
- Anne Penny (1729–1784), poet
- Ellis Peters (1913–1995), Welsh-English mystery fiction writer and translator: Brother Cadfael
- Pascale Petit (born 1953), poet
- Katherine Philips (1632–1664), poet and translator
- Angharad Price (living), novelist and academic
- Myfanwy Pryce (1890–1976), fiction writer

== R ==
- Allen Raine, pen name of Anne Adalisa Beynon Puddicombe (1836–1908), novelist in English and Welsh
- Helen Raynor (born 1972), television screenwriter, script editor and playwright
- Sarah Jane Rees (1839–1916), teacher, poet and temperance campaigner
- Deryn Rees-Jones (fl. since 1994), poet and essayist
- Eigra Lewis Roberts (born 1939), poet, children's writer and novelist in Welsh
- Kate Roberts (1891–1985), Welsh-language fiction writer
- Manon Steffan Ros
- Jane Helen Rowlands (1891–1955), linguist, non-fiction writer and missionary
- Bernice Rubens (1923–2004), novelist: The Elected Member

== S ==
- Carole Seymour-Jones (born 1963), biographer, columnist and literary non-fiction writer
- Norena Shopland author, historian in LGBTQ+ history and Welsh history
- Dorothy Simpson (1933–2020), mystery novelist and crime-fiction writer
- Mari Strachan (born 1945), novelist and librarian
- Jennifer Sullivan (born 1945), children's writer and critic
- Rosie Swale-Pope (born 1946), non-fiction writer and marathon runner

== T ==
- Louie Myfanwy Thomas (1908–1968), novelist
- Hester Thrale (1741–1821), diarist
- Barbara Margaret Trimble (1921–1995), novelist

== V ==
- Hilda Vaughan (1892–1985), fiction writer, playwright: The Invader

== W ==
- Jo Walton (born 1964), Welsh-Canadian romance and science fiction novelist: Tooth and Claw
- Anna Laetitia Waring (1823–1910), poet and hymnist
- Sarah Waters (born 1966), novelist: Fingersmith
- Susie Wild (born 1979), novelist, journalist and editor
- Sioned Wiliam (born 1962), novelist and broadcasting executive
- Anna Williams (1706–1783), poet
- Jane Williams (1806–1885), biographer and non-fiction writer

== Y ==
- Paula Yates (1959–2000), non-fiction writer and television presenter

== See also ==
- List of women writers
