= Philip Dafydd =

Welsh Methodist and poet, c. 1732 – c. 1814

Philip Dafydd (c. 1732 – c. 1814) was a Welsh Methodist exhorter, and a poet.

== Methodism ==
Dafydd lived in the Newcastle Emlyn area, and was by trade a clog maker. Before a local Methodist chapel was built there in 1776, he is known to have held regular society meetings at his own house.

== Poetry ==
The poetical works of Dafydd include elegies on Daniel Rowland (printed in 1797) and William Williams Pantycelyn (printed in 1791).
