= Meredydd Barker =

Welsh playwright

Meredydd Barker is a Welsh playwright working in both Welsh and English. Barker originally trained as a sculptor. His plays include The Rabbit (2001), Buzz (2004), Acqua Nero (2007), Two Princes (2007), and Nye and Jennie (2018). The latter, a play about the relationship between Aneurin Bevan and Jennie Lee, was commissioned by Theatr na nÓg.
