= Eigra Lewis Roberts =

Welsh-language writer and playwright (1939–2026)

- Born: 7 August 1939; Blaenau Ffestiniog, Merionethshire, Wales
- Died: 5 March 2026 (aged 86); Bangor, Gwynedd, Wales
- Education: University College of North Wales
- Spouse: Llew
- Children: 3
- Writing career
- Language: Welsh
- Subject: Post-War women in Wales
- Notable awards: Multiple awards at the National Eisteddfod of Wales

Eigra Lewis Roberts (7 August 1939 – 5 March 2026) was a Welsh-language author, whose work included about 30 plays, short stories, children's books and novels. She won several awards at the National Eisteddfod of Wales.

== Background ==
Born in Blaenau Ffestiniog, Roberts attended Ffestiniog County School, along with her fellow author John Rowlands and the poet Gwyn Thomas. Having graduated from University College of North Wales in Bangor, she taught in Holyhead and Llanrwst and lived in Dolwyddelan. Roberts had an honorary MA from the University of Wales.

Roberts died at the age of 86 on 5 March 2026.

== Career ==
Aged 20, Roberts won the open novel prize at the 1959 Caernarfon National Eisteddfod of Wales. In the 1960s and 1970s she was known for writing about the lives and dissatisfaction of Welsh women in Post-war Britain, a topic little covered by Welsh authors at the time. In the 1980s, she was the screenwriter adapting her novel Mis o Fehefin for the Welsh television programme Minafon.

In 2006, Roberts wrote her first novel in English, the semi-autobiographical Return Ticket. That year she won the Crown in the Swansea National Eisteddfod for a collection of poems about Sylvia Plath. In 2013, her work Parlwr Bach was shortlisted for the Wales Book of the Year award.

== Selected works ==
- Brynhyfryd, 1959
- Mis o Fehefin, 1980
- Return Ticket, 2006 (Gomer Press)
- Parlwr Bach, 2013
