= Liz Herbert McAvoy =

Welsh literary historian

Liz Herbert McAvoy FLSW FRSA
- Occupation: Literary historian

Academic background
- Education: Aberystwyth University

Academic work
- Discipline: Medieval literature
- Sub-discipline: Medieval women's literature; medieval anchorites
- Institutions: Swansea University

Elizabeth Herbert McAvoy is a Welsh scholar of medieval literature who specialises in medieval women's literature, particularly anchorites. She is Professor Emerita of Medieval Studies at Swansea University.

== Biography ==
Liz Herbert McAvoy was educated at Aberystwyth University, where she got her first degree in 1977 and her PhD in Medieval English Literature. In 2005, she joined Swansea University, where she was Reader in Gender in English Studies and Medieval Literature. She was later promoted to Professor of Medieval Studies and Emeritus Professor. She has also held a Personal Chair in English Literature and Creative Writing at the University. She also holds an Honorary Senior Research Associate position at the University of Bristol.

McAvoy specialises in medieval women's literature and in medieval anchorites. In addition to editing several volumes, she has also written several books. She served as Associate Director at the Swansea University Centre for Medieval and Early Modern Research. After becoming Vice-President of the Society for Medieval Feminist Scholarship in 2013, she was promoted to President in 2015, serving until 2017.

She was elected Fellow of the Learned Society of Wales in 2015. She became a Fellow of the Royal Society of Arts in 2015.

== Publications ==
- The Book of Margery Kempe (2003)
- Authority and the Female Body in the Writings of Julian of Norwich and Margery Kempe (2004)
- Consuming Narratives: Gender and Monstrous Appetite in the Middle Ages and the Renaissance (2002, as editor)
- Anchorites Wombs and Tombs Intersections of Gender and Enclosure in the Middle Ages (2005, as editor)
- Rhetoric of the Anchorhold: Space, Place and Body within the Discourses of Enclosure (2008, as editor)
- A Companion to Julian of Norwich (2008, as editor)
- Anchoritic Traditions of Medieval Europe (2010, as editor)
- Medieval Anchoritisms: Gender, Space and the Solitary Life (2011, as editor)
- The History of British Women's Writing. Vol. 1 700–1500 (2012, as co-editor)
