= Maurice Dafydd =

Welsh hymn-writer

Maurice Dafydd was an 18th-century Welsh hymn-writer.

His works include a booklet published in 1789, containing hymns such as 'Am graig I adeiladu...'. He is thought to have been a member of Bala Congregational Church.
