= Siôn Abel =

Siôn Abel, also known as John Abel, (fl. 18th century) was a Welsh balladeer and teacher who lived in Montgomeryshire (Sir Drefaldwyn, now part of Powys).

== Work ==
In 1783, Abel wrote a poem entitled "A Christmas Carol" in Welsh three-stroke metre (Welsh: tri-thrawiad). He was also the author of "Song against Drunkenness, Lies and Miserliness" (as Cerdd yn Erbyn Medd-dod, Celwydd a Chybydd-dra), published in a booklet of three ballads by H. Lloyd of Shrewsbury and listed in the Bibliography of Welsh Ballads (1909–1911) by J. H. Davies. Another recorded work of his is the elegy "Ffarwel Ned Puw" (Farewell Ned Pugh).
