= Catrin ferch Gruffudd ap Hywel =

Welsh poet (fl. 1555)

Catrin ferch Gruffudd ap Hywel (fl. 1555) was a Welsh poet from Anglesey who, as a devout Catholic and Recusant, wrote poetry extensively as a critic of the Protestant Reformation. Many of her poems still survive due to preservation by the National Library of Wales.

== Biography ==
Catrin ferch Gruffudd ap Hywel lived in the village of Llanddaniel Fab on Anglesey, and was a poet active around the 1550s. Her husband was Roman Catholic priest Robert ap Rhys, and their son later became an Anglican parson. (Note: During this period in Wales, "unofficial marriages to Catholic clergy were common".) She was related to the poet Wiliam Cynwal, who died around 1587. A devout Catholic, her poems had religious themes and she wrote extensively about her opposition to the Protestant Reformation. In one englyn, she wrote:

Welsh

Y côr a'r allor a ddrylliwyd – ar gam
Ac ymaith y taflwyd,
A'r Lading a erlidiwyd
O gôr a llan y gŵr llwyd.

English

The choir and altar have been destroyed – wrongly
And cast aside,
The Latin language has been persecuted
[and ousted] from the choir and church of the holy Man.

Liz Herbert McAvoy places emphasis on her usage of Latin in worship and Welsh for "the literary expression of her religious beliefs", noting that this provides a unique perspective of a "Welsh woman's personal reaction to the assault on her religion". In another poem dated around 1553, Catrin wrote that she was angry at the "Stealing of the chalice of Christ, stealing church and chancel / Without any gain but arrogance and exploitation". She also wrote an awdl praising Christ, and a series of englynion about the cold summer of 1555. Presumably towards the end of her life, she wrote a poem expressing that she "prays and weeps in her bed at night, visualizing Christ's suffering at the Crucifixtion; confessing her sins, she prepares for death", suggesting that she was terminally ill.

Many of Catrin's poems have survived through preservation by the National Library of Wales. (Note: Though some of her poems are misattributed to the similarly named Catrin ferch Gruffudd ab Ieuan Fychan.) As a result, McAvoy considers her to be one of the most famous female Welsh poets of the late medieval/early modern era, while historian Lloyd Bowen writes that her poems offer "a valuable (and rare) female perspective on religious change in this period".
