= Ellen Hughes =

Welsh-language writer, temperance reformer, suffragist

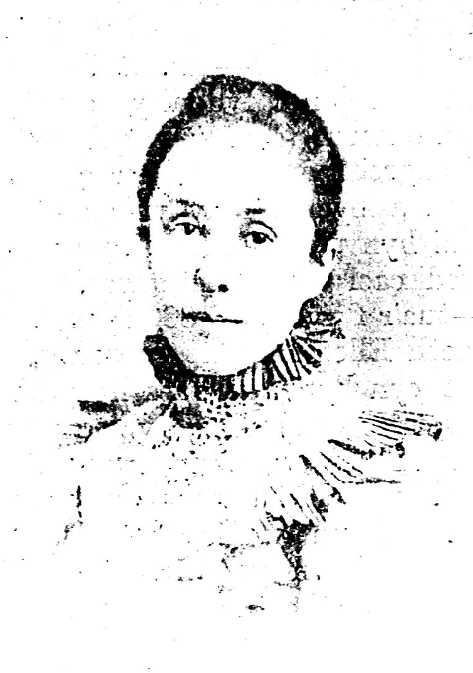
Miss Ellen Hughes, Llanengan

Ellen Hughes (1867–1927) was a Welsh-language writer, temperance reformer and suffragist from Llanengan in North Wales.

Strongly influenced by Sarah Jane Rees, she had a poem published in the Welsh-language women's periodical Y Frythones in 1885, when she was only 18. The year 1907 saw the publication of the essay Angylion yr Aelwyd (Angels in the Home) which she had written in 1899. Now a member of the Undeb Dirwestol Merched y De (UDMD), the South Wales Women's Temperance Union, her article criticized men's arguments for keeping women out of parliament. The same year she also published Murmur y Gragen. Sef detholion o gyfansoddiadau barddonol a rhyddiaethol (Murmur of the Shell: Selection of Poetry and Prose).

In her A View Across the Valley: Short Stories by Women from Wales (1999), Jane Aaron describes Hughes as "arguably the Welsh-language author of the period who comes closest to being a feminist in the modern sense". Covering her contributions to the journal Y Gymraes (The Welsh Woman) in 1900, she quotes a passage in which Hughes mocks William Gladstone, the prime minister of the day: "The idea that an elder of the wisdom of Mr Gladstone should doubt the capacity of the majority of women to vote in an election strikes us as wonderfully astonishing!".

== Selected works ==
- Hughes, Ellen (1885). Sibrwd yr awel, sef Cyfansoddiadau barddonol. Robert Owen.
- Hughes, Ellen (1907). Murmur Y Gragen. Sef Detholion O Gyfansoddiadau Barddonol a Rhyddiaethol. Dolgellau.
