= Edward Ross Wharton =

Edward Ross Wharton (1844–1896) was an English academic, known as a classical scholar and genealogist.

== Life ==
Born at Rhyl, Flintshire, Wales on 4 August 1844, he was second son of Henry James Wharton, vicar of Mitcham; his mother was a daughter of Thomas Peregrine Courtenay, and a younger brother, Henry Thornton Wharton (1846–1895) was a medical man known as an ornithologist and for an edition of Sappho, Sappho: Memoir, Text, Selected Renderings, and a Literal Translation. He was educated as a day-boy at Charterhouse School under Richard Elwyn and elected to a scholarship at Trinity College, Oxford in 1862. He graduated as a BA in 1868 and an MA in 1870. Despite poor health and eyesight, he won the Ireland scholarship in his second year. He was placed in the first class in classical moderations and in the final classical school.

In 1868 Wharton was elected to a fellowship at Jesus College, where he was assistant tutor and Latin lecturer. He died at Oxford on 4 June 1896, and his remains were cremated at Woking.

== Works ==
Wharton published:

- Etyma Græca (1882), an etymological lexicon of classical Greek (1882)
- Etyma Latina (1890)
- Translations of Aristotle's Poetics and Book i. of Horace's Satires
- Papers for the London Philological Society and the French Société Linguistique

Six manuscript volumes left to the Bodleian Library contained genealogical researches into the family named Wharton or Warton, including the baronial family of Wharton of Wharton Hall, now in Cumbria. A sketch of the family which he completed just before his death was printed by his widow in 1898.

== Family ==
In 1870 Wharton married Marie, a daughter of Samuel Hicks Withers of Willesden, who died in 1899. They had no children.
