= Dafydd Glyn Dyfrdwy =

Welsh bard

Dafydd Glyn Dyfrdwy was a 16th-century Welsh bard. He is known to have written a number of cywydd style poems.
