= Y Bergam =

14th-century Welsh poet

Y Bergam was a fourteenth-century poet and prophet from Maelor, an area that was once part of north east Wales and now is in Wrexham County Borough, England. His prophesies are known to have inspired a number of vaticinatory poems (Cywyddau Brud), such as those found in Early Vaticination in Welsh (1937).
