= Dafydd Llwyd Sybylltir =

Dafydd Llwyd Sybylltir was a 17th-century Welsh poet, from the Sybylltir area of Anglesey. He is known to have composed a number of love poems, written in free metre.
