= Mark Ellis (Welsh author) =

British writer

- Born: 27 September 1953 (age 71); London
- Education: Law at St John's College, Cambridge
- Alma mater: Llandovery College
- Notable work: Princes Gate (2011), Stalin's Gold (2014)
- Website: http://www.markellisauthor.com

Mark Ellis (born 27 September 1953) is a thriller writer from Swansea and former barrister and entrepreneur. He has attended Llandovery College and later studied law at St John's College, Cambridge. He co-founded 4Front Technologies in 1991 and in 2004 began writing full-time.

== Bibliography ==
=== Frank Merlin series ===
- Princes Gate (2011) ISBN 9781848766570
- Stalin's Gold (2014) ISBN 9781783062478
- Merlin at War (2017) ISBN 9780995566705
