= Thomas Evans (poet, 1840–1865) =

Welsh poet

Thomas Evans (Telynog) (8 September 1840 – 29 April 1865), was a Welsh poet.

Evans, son of a ship-carpenter, was born in Cardigan in 1840. His early education was very rudimentary. At the age of eleven he was apprenticed on board one of the small trading vessels that visited his native town. His treatment was so bad that he determined to run away. He went to Aberdare, and worked in a coal-mine. From here he sent a letter to his mother, written in verse (his first attempt), apprising her of his whereabouts. When about fifteen he devoted his leisure hours to music, and attracted public attention as a singer. Shortly after this he competed successfully at a small eisteddfod, held at the chapel where he was a member, for the best poem on 'Humility.' This brought him into public notice, and henceforth his name was constantly in the local papers and in connection with eisteddfodau, where he won twenty prizes. All this time he worked as a common collier. His last six years were spent in constant battle first with dyspepsia, and then with consumption. He died 29 April 1865 and was buried in Aberdare Cemetery. His poems were characterised by pathos and pleasantry, and had a charm that always touched his countrymen. His poetical works were collected and arranged by Dafydd Morganwg, and published in 1866, small 8vo (224 pp.), with a brief memoir from the pen of Howel Williams, eight hundred copies having been subscribed for beforehand.
