= Dafydd Nanconwy =

Welsh poet

Dafydd Nanconwy was a 17th-century Welsh poet.

Nanconwy's father may have been the poet Tomas Dafydd ap Ieuan ap Rhys ap Gronnw ap Meyrick ap Llewelyn ap Richard ap Dafydd of Pwll-y-Crochan in 'Llechwedd Isaf’ (i.e. Arllechwedd Isaf), Caernarfonshire.

Nanconwy's work includes a cywydd style poem written to Captain William Myddelton of Gwaenynog. Nanconwy was a contemporary of Harri Howel and Huw Machno.
