= Bob Lock =

Welsh science fiction and fantasy writer

Bob Unlock

Bob Lock (born 1949) is a Welsh science fiction and fantasy writer.

== Biography ==
Bob Lock was born in 1949, in Gower near Swansea.

His work first appeared on Youwriteon.

== Bibliography ==
- The Leaf in the Stone, published in Cold Cuts 1 (An anthology of horror stories) ISBN 0-907117-63-5
- Nearly Home, published in Cold Cuts 2 (An anthology of horror stories ISBN 0-907117-68-6
- Featured in Tapestries of the heart (An anthology of poems) ISBN 1-4140-2077-5
- Flames of Herakleitos
- Madness
- The Empathy Effect
- They Feed on Flesh
