= William Evans (divine) =

Welsh Presbyterian minister

William Evans (d. abt 1719), was a Welsh Presbyterian minister. In 1707, Evans published The Principles of the Christian Religion, which would later be adapted for use teaching adult baptism. While he was pastor at Carmarthen, Evans ran the Carmarthen Academy, teaching divinity students at a collegiate level.

== Biography ==
Evans was educated at the Ystrad Walter College, while the Rev. Rees Prytherch was president of the school.

Evans was ordained at Pencader, in 1688 and was the pastor there for fifteen years. In 1703, he moved to Carmarthen to become pastor of the presbyterian congregation. He also taught divinity students.

In 1707, Evans publishedThe Principles of the Christian Religion in Welsh, which was based on Westminster Assembly's catechism. In 1714, he published, and wrote a preface for, Gemmeu Doethineb ("Gems of Wisdom"), a work by his former tutor Rees Prytherch. In 1717, he wrote the preface for Iago ab Dewi's (James Davies') translation of Matthew Henry's Catechism.

Evans had numerous patrons. One was Dr. Daniel Williams who bequeathed a sum of money for his work, which was available to Evans' successors.

He retired about 1718.

== Death and legacy ==
Evans died from about 1718 to 1720.

He has been called the "founder of the Welsh Academy", apparently because he was the first to teach divinity students at a collegiate level. In 1757, Abel Morgan re-published Evans's Principles of the Christian Religion, which Morgan had adapted for use teaching adult baptism.

== Bibliography ==
This article incorporates text from a publication now in the public domain: Jones, R.M.J. (1889). "Evans, William (d.1720?)". In Stephen, Leslie (ed.). Dictionary of National Biography. Vol. 18. London: Smith, Elder & Co. pp. 75–76.
