= Julian E. Ruck =

Welsh novelist, broadcaster and political commentator

Julian Edwin Ruck
- Born: 1956 (age 69–70); Swansea, Wales
- Education: St Michael's School, Bryn
- Occupations: Novelist, broadcaster, political commentator
- Writing career
- Language: English
- Years active: 2006–present
- Notable works: Ragged Cliffs; Inheritance Lost; An Equal Judge; The Bent Brief; The Silver Songsters; A Judge and Nothing But; Not Yet
- Website: julianruck.co.uk

Julian Edwin Ruck (born 1956) is a Welsh novelist, broadcaster, and political commentator.

== Early life and education ==
Julian Ruck was born in 1956 in Swansea, Wales. He spent his childhood in the Derwen Fawr area of Swansea. He was educated at St Michael's School, Bryn.

== Career ==
Ruck pursued a career in law and received his training as a lawyer in London. Later, Ruck worked as a law lecturer in the UK and managed Legal Aid contracts. He also spent time living in Denmark and the Middle East.

After retiring from the legal profession, he focused on writing full-time. His first two novels, Ragged Cliffs and Inheritance Lost, were published in 2006 and attracted enough attention to secure him representation from literary agents Andrew Nurnberg. Subsequently, he signed a contract with Carmarthenshire-based Dinefwr Publishing, which released all three novels in his Treharne Saga.

In addition to fiction writing, Ruck contributes columns to the Llanelli Star and has written for the South Wales Evening Post, where he frequently voices his opinions on a range of topics. He also maintains a personal blog where he publishes his views. Alongside writing, Ruck has been involved in organizing literary events. He founded the Kidwell-e Festival, a literary festival with the stated goal of being "inclusive, not exclusive" and promoting reading and literature in the digital age. In 2012, Ruck began organising Cydweli Literary Festival. Later that same year, he announced his intention to leave Wales and return to England, expressing "profound disappointment" with what he perceived as resistance to change, "nasty tribalism", and intolerance of anything associated with "Englishness".

Ruck has been a vocal critic of the Welsh literary establishment and its reliance on public funding for writers and publishers. He has referred to the Welsh publishing industry as "a parasitical, elitist carbuncle on the hide of a struggling Welsh economy" and has said that subsidies diminish the need for writers to engage with readers.

His criticisms have led to harassment from some quarters; in 2013, he filed complaints with the police after rival bloggers allegedly posted threatening messages, including threats to throw dog excrement and copies of his books at his home. Ruck attributed this hostility to his objections to the "old Labour Welsh establishment" and his highlighting of how public funds were allocated to support Welsh literary figures.

In October 2015, Ruck was seriously injured in a hit-and-run incident outside his home in Kidwelly, suffering brain and leg injuries that required intensive care and a lengthy recovery. Two years later, he published his seventh novel, Not Yet.

In 2017, Ruck appeared on a BBC Newsnight segment discussing the Welsh language and expressed his opposition to public funding of the language.

== Writing ==
Julian Ruck is the author of the Treharne Saga, a trilogy of novels set in Wales. The first two books, Ragged Cliffs and Inheritance Lost, were published in 2006. Inheritance Lost, set in Gower, follows a Falklands War veteran who rekindles a past romance amid the Treharne family's complex relationships and hidden secrets. The third novel, An Equal Judge, concluded the trilogy and was published by Dinefwr Publishing.

After the Treharne Saga, Ruck wrote The Silver Songsters, inspired by his father-in-law, Illtyd John Loveluck, who had been a boy soprano. The book tells the story of two boy sopranos, one Welsh and the other a Jewish refugee from Germany. In 2015, Ruck published A Judge and Nothing But, a political thriller set in Westminster and the Home Office, which he described as "brazenly politically incorrect" and aimed at cautioning against extremism. His seventh novel, Not Yet, was released after he recovered from a hit-and-run incident, taking place during a 1960s oil rig disaster and the subsequent Aberdeen oil boom of the 1970s.

== Books ==
- Ragged Cliffs. The Treharne Saga. Vol. 1. Dinefwr Publishers Ltd. 2006. ISBN 978-1904323181.
- Inheritance Lost. The Treharne Saga. Vol. 2. ISIS Publishing. 2008. ISBN 978-0955265815.
- An Equal Judge. The Treharne Saga. Vol. 3. Dinefwr Publishers Ltd. 2010. ISBN 978-1904323204.
- The Bent Brief. Dinefwr Publishers Ltd. 2012. ISBN 978-1904323242.
- The Silver Songsters. Dinefwr Publishers Ltd. 2014. ISBN 978-1904323303.
- A Judge and Nothing But. Dinefwr Publishers Ltd. 2015. ISBN 978-1904323327.
- Not Yet. ISIS Publishing. 2017. ISBN 9780955265822.
