= Hafina Clwyd =

Welsh author, columnist and feminist

- Born: July 1, 1936; Gwyddelwern, Wales
- Died: March 14, 2011 (aged 75)
- Education: Bangor Normal College
- Occupations: Educator, writer, journalist

Hafina Clwyd (1 July 1936 – 14 March 2011) was a Welsh educator, writer and journalist. She had a weekly column in the Western Mail.

== Early life and education ==
Mair Hafina Clwyd Jones was born at Gwyddelwern, and raised on a farm at Llandyrnog. Her family were Welsh speakers. She trained to be a teacher at Bangor Normal College.

== Career ==
Clwyd moved to London at age 21, to work as a teacher. There she co-founded a Welsh literary club, and was an officer of the Honourable Society of Cymmrodorion.

After returning to Wales in the late 1970s, she edited a community newspaper in Ruthin (Y Bedol) and a national weekly newspaper, Y Faner. She was on the Ruthin town council from 1999 until the year she died, and served a term as mayor of the town (2008–2009). She was recognized with an honorary fellowship at Bangor University in 2005, "for services to journalism."

Clwyd published eleven books, mainly essay collections, including Clichau yn y Glaw (1973), Defaid yn Chwerthin (1980), Clust y Wenci (1997) and Prynu Lein Ddillad (2009) Her works also included an edition of her own diaries from young womanhood, Buwch ar y Lein (1987), an autobiography, Merch Morfydd (1987), and a local history, Pobol sy'n Cyfri (2001). She also edited Welsh Family History: A Guide to Research. Her last book, Mynd i'r Gwrych: Dyddiaduron, 1993–1999 (2011) was published posthumously.

== Personal life ==
Clwyd married fellow teacher Clifford Coppack as her second husband in 1971. She was widowed in 1997. Clwyd died in 2011 from melanoma.
