= Sarah Winifred Parry =

Welsh writer

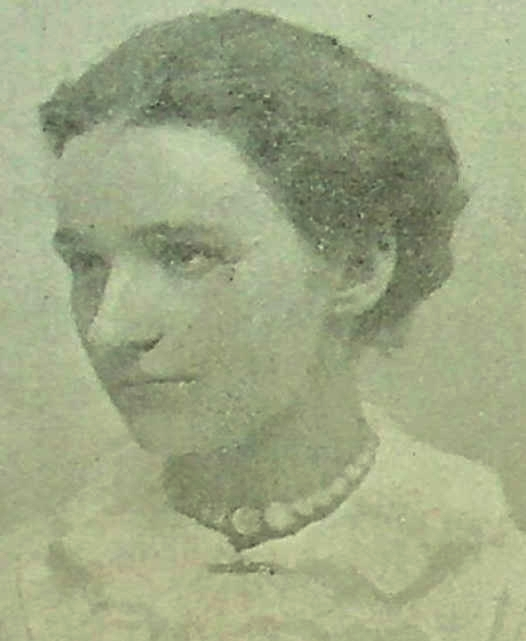
- Born: 20 May 1870; Welshpool, Montgomeryshire, Wales
- Died: 12 February 1953 (aged 82); Croydon, London Borough of Croydon, England
- Other name: Winnie Parry
- Occupation: Writer
- Years active: 1893–1915
- Notable work: Sioned

Sarah Winifred Parry (20 May 1870 – 12 February 1953) was a Welsh writer most known for developing the modern Welsh short story. She used her nickname Winnie Parry as her pen name. She became a household name with her serialized fiction in periodicals at the turn of the twentieth century. Her most acclaimed work, Sioned, first published as a serial between 1894 and 1896 was introduced as a novel in 1906 and was reissued in 1988 and 2003.

After the end of her literary career, Parry worked as a secretary for the politician Sir Robert Thomas, 1st Baronet. Efforts by the BBC to adapt her works have ended in development hell.

== Early life ==
Sarah Winifred Parry was born on 20 May 1870 in Welshpool, Montgomeryshire, to Margaret (née Roberts) and Hugh Thomas Parry. Shortly after her birth, the family moved to Port Dinorwic and were enumerated on the 1871 census with Parry's maternal grandfather John Roberts. By 1876, they were living in London at Croydon, when the mother died. At that time, Parry returned to live with her grandparents, John and Ellen Roberts in Port Dinorwic (now known as Felinheli, Caernarfonshire). There is little evidence that she had formal schooling, but she spoke both English and the colloquial dialect of Port Dinorwic and studied with her grandfather. Her father remarried in 1877 and took her siblings and his new wife to South Africa in 1882, leaving Parry with the Roberts.

== Literary career ==
As early as 1893, Parry began contributing to periodicals such as Cymru (Wales), Cymru'r Plant (Welsh Children) and Y Cymro (the Welshman). Her best known novel, Sioned, was originally serialized in the journal Cymru between 1894 and 1896. In 1896, she wrote a series called "Catrin Prisiard" which appeared in Y Cymro and also published in The Cambrian and Wales. When her grandfather died in 1903, Parry moved to the home of her uncle Owen Parry, who was the Chief Minister of Cemaes, Anglesey on the north coast of Wales.

In 1906, Sioned was published in book form by Cwmni y cyhoeddwyr Cymreig of Caernarfon and the following year, Cerrig y rhyd was published by the same house. During this most prolific period, Parry and Sarah Maria Saunders became household names in Wales due to the popularity of their fiction and articles. At the turn of the century, Parry and T. Gwynn Jones were the most noted writers of the Welsh short story, which reflected everyday life in colloquial speech. Sioned is considered her masterpiece.

In 1908, Parry's father returned from abroad and she went to Croydon to live with him, working as an editor at Cymru'r Plant until 1912. Cerrig y rhyd was reprinted in 1915 and after that time, she gave up writing, instead working as a secretary for an engineering firm.

== Later life ==
Between 1922 and 1928, she served as a secretary for Sir Robert Thomas, MP of Anglesey. In 1928, a collection of her earlier periodical contributions was published as Y ddau hogyn rheiny by Foyle's of London, but after this time, almost all connection to Wales was lost. Several attempts were made to republish Sioned, as well as adapting some of her works for the BBC's Welsh Children's Hour, though none were successful due to the hardships during and after World War II.

== Death ==
Parry died on 12 February 1953 in Croydon and was buried there. Posthumously, Honno republished Sioned in 1988 and re-released it in 2003.

== Selected works ==
- Parry, Winnie (1906). Sioned: darluniau o fywyd gwledig yng Nghymru (in Welsh). Caernarfon, Wales: Cwmni y cyhoeddwyr Cymreig. OCLC 48516434. Sioned has a dedicated article available at Welsh Wikipedia.
- Parry, Winnie (2025). Sioned: A New Translation. Translated by John Ifor Wyburn. Kindle Direct Publishing. ASIN B0FJMW465X. ISBN 9798293759514.
- Parry, Winnie (1907). Cerrig y Rhyd (in Welsh). Caernarfon, Wales: Cwmni y cyhoeddwyr Cymreig. OCLC 563641432.
- Parry, Winnie (1928). Y ddau hogyn rheiny (in Welsh). London, England: Foyle's Welsh Depot. OCLC 52723140.
