= Myfanwy Pryce =

Welsh novelist and writer (1890–1976)

Myfanwy Pryce (3 October 1890 – 16 March 1976) was a Welsh novelist and short story writer, author of nine published novels. Her works were admired for their gentle humour and literary technique.

== Early life and education ==
Lucy Myfanwy Pryce was born in 1890, near Llandeilo, Carmarthenshire, and lived at Rhyl, the youngest of seven daughters of Rev. Shadrach Pryce (1833–1914), the dean of St. Asaph Cathedral, and his wife Margaret Ellen Davies (1943–1902). Myfanwy Pryce's brother Lewis Pryce became the Archdeacon of Wrexham; her uncle was John Pryce, the Dean of Bangor Cathedral.

== Career ==
In 1915, she shared the Lyric Prize at the National Eisteddfod. During World War I, she worked in London, at the Red Cross War Library, and at the Ministry of National Service.

Myfanwy Pryce began publishing fiction with her novel Blue Moons (1919), an "amusing and vivid account of girls' lives" during World War I. In reviewing her later novel, The Wood Ends, the Glasgow Herald praised Pryce's "lightness of strokes", and found the book "a particularly neat exercise in psychology." An Australian reviewer admired the "placid charm and gentle humour" of her writing.

== Books by Myfanwy Pryce ==
- Blue Moons (1919)
- Parsons' Wives (1926)
- Gingerbread Lea (1927)
- Wild Oats Meadow (1927)
- Blind Lead (1928)
- The Gift and Other Stories (short story collection, 1932)
- The Wood Ends (1937)
- Lady in the Dark (1938)
- Anything Might Happen (1939)
- A Life of My Own (1946)

== Legacy ==
Myfanwy Pryce died in 1976, age 86. Her papers, including unpublished and unfinished manuscripts, are in the National Library of Wales.

A floral coverlet embroidered by Pryce during World War II is in the Quilters' Guild Collection at the former Quilt Museum and Gallery in York.
