= Mary Davies (poet) =

Welsh poet (1846–1882)

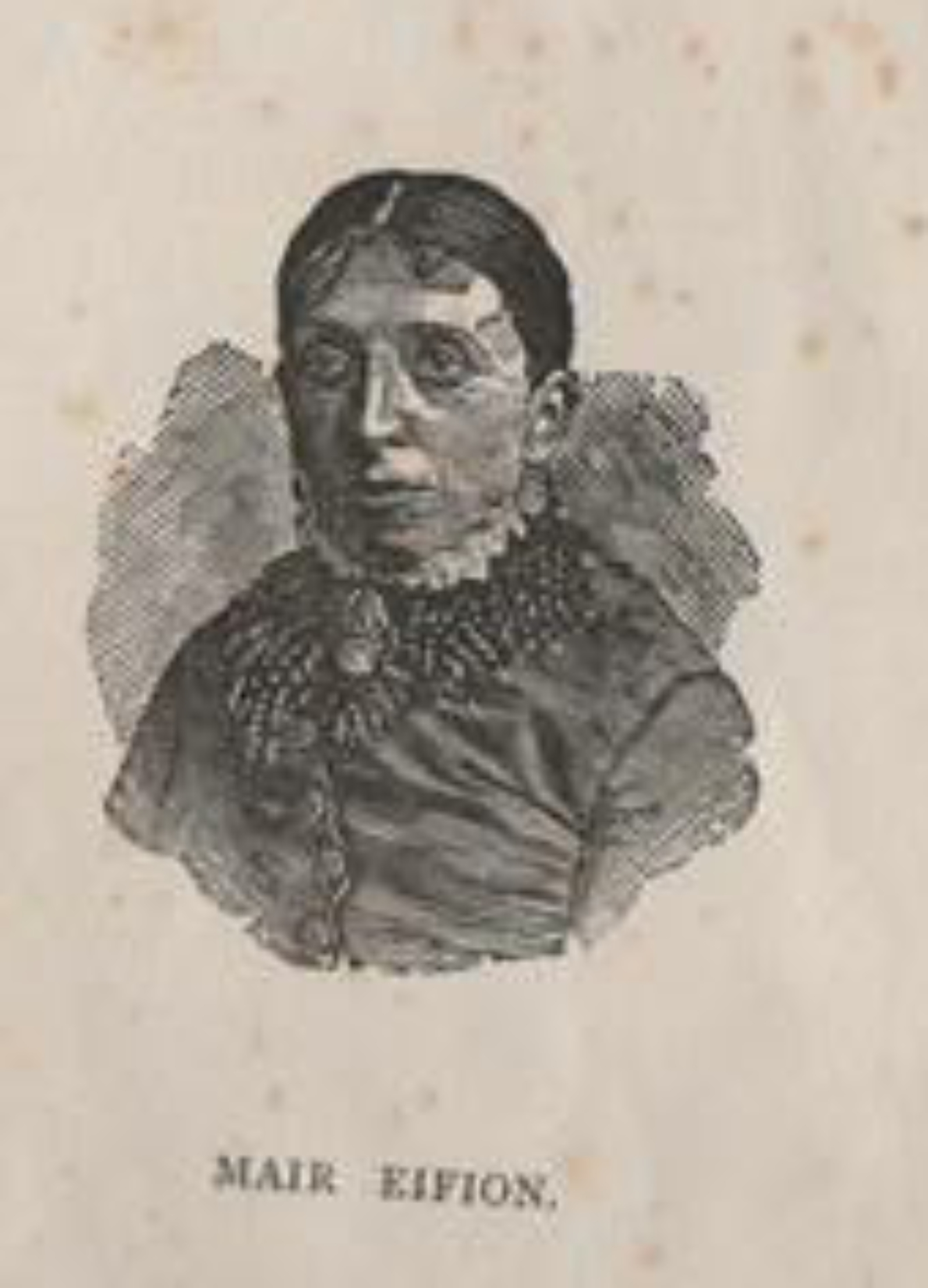
Mair Eifion

Mary Davies (17 October 1846 – 8 October 1882), also known as Mair Eifion, was a Welsh poet writing in the Welsh language.

== Biography ==
Mary Davies was born 17 October 1846, in Portmadoc (so spelt at the time), North Wales, where she resided for the whole of her life. She was the eldest daughter of Captain Lewis Davies and his wife Jennet, who ran the Tregunter Arms, a public house in Portmadoc. She was educated at a private school there, maintained by a daughter of the writer William Rees, better known by his bardic name Gwilym Hiraethog.

== Verse and appreciation ==
Mary Davies displayed from a young age a talent for writing poetry. Her work began to be published in the periodical Y Dysgedydd, which was edited in 1853–1873 by William Ambrose (Emrys), a mentor of hers, along with Ioan Madog (John Williams, 1812–1878).

After she had begun to win prizes locally for her poems and essays, Davies was admitted to the Gorsedd circle at the 1875 National Eisteddfod in Pwllheli. After her death in 1882, William Roberts edited her works of poetry and published them under the title Blodeu Eifion, sef Gwaith Barddonol Mair Eifion.

== Death ==
Mary Davies died unmarried in Porthmadog on 8 October 1882 and was buried at Soar, near Talsarnau.
