= Nia Medi =

Welsh actress and author

- Occupations: Actress; author

Nia Medi is a Welsh actress and author.

== Biography ==
Originally from Llanfair, near Harlech in North Wales, she now lives in the Dolgellau area.

She attended The Normal College in Bangor.

As an actress her most famous screen work is the film Wild Justice (1994), directed by Paul Turner, also screened under the titles Covert Assassin and Dial (Welsh for "Revenge"). The film also stars Nicholas McGaughey, David Griffith, Dafydd Emyr, Patricia Millardet, Christine Pritchard and Trevor Selway. It was previously a TV mini-series, but Nia was not involved with this.

Medi has written scripts for radio and stage shows, and has also worked in house design, such as on the Real Rooms TV programme.

Her debut novel, written in Welsh, is titled Omlet ("Omelette") 2005). The novel is about Angharad Austin, a single teacher in her thirties, who faces a range of problems associated with men, alcohol and friends. The novel uses a modern style of Welsh, very similar to that of Bethan Gwanas. The novel has been made into a film, with the main character played by actress Delyth Eirwyn. The film was shot on location in Greece and North Wales, and was to air on Welsh TV channel S4C in the fall of 2008.

She is currently working on a second novel, with the working title Mwy o wy ("More Egg").

== Bibliography ==
- Medi, Nia (2005). Omlet. Gwasg Gwynedd. ISBN 978-0-86074-218-0.
