= Amy Parry-Williams =

Welsh singer and writer (1910–1988)

Lady Amy Parry-Williams
- Born: Amy Thomas; Pontyberem, Carmarthenshire, Wales
- Died: 28 January 1988 (aged 77) Aberystwyth, Wales
- Genre: Folk
- Occupations: Singer, writer
- Years active: 1940s-1960s
- Spouse: T. H. Parry-Williams (m. 1942)

Amy, Lady Parry-Williams (née Thomas; 18 December 1910 – 28 January 1988) was a Welsh singer and writer with a special interest in Welsh folk traditions. An active broadcaster, she was an early director of the Welsh television company HTV.

Effective 1958, she was known as Lady Parry-Williams, as her husband T. H. Parry-Williams was knighted. She was entitled to the courtesy title of Lady.

== Early life ==
Born in Pontyberem, Carmarthenshire, the eldest child of Mary Emiah (née Jones) and Lewis Thomas, she attended Llanelli Girls' Grammar School before entering the University College of Wales, Aberystwyth, where she graduated in Welsh (1932). In 1942, she married one of her former teachers, Professor T. H. Parry-Williams. When he was knighted in 1958, she became Lady Parry-Williams.

== Music career ==
From an early age, together with her brother Madoc and her sister Mary, she competed successfully in the Carmarthenshire eisteddfodau, singing penillion lyrics written by her father. She also sang at university, taking the lead role in the opera Rhosyn y Coleg. Thanks to her interest in Welsh folk music, she published two articles on Welsh folk songs. The folk songs she recorded in the late 1940s for the Welsh Recorded Music Society were among the earliest reviewed by the Gramophone magazine. She sang Welsh-language songs at the Llangollen Eisteddfod and at the Albert Hall while acting as an adjudicator at the National Eisteddfod. Together with her husband, she wrote the words "Beth yw'r haf i mi?" to an 18th-century harp tune. As a broadcaster, she sang songs for children and presented television programmes on the folk tradition. She was an early director of the HTV commercial television company.

== Literary works ==
In addition to her short story Henrietta (1938), she published the farce Tŷ ar y rhos (1944) as well as three collections: Deg o storïau (1950), Y plât piwtar a storïau eraill (1962), and Dyddiadur Jane Parry (1965).

== Death and legacy ==
Lady Parry-Williams died on 28 January 1988 in Aberystwyth, aged 77. Established in 1990 in Parry-Williams's memory as a former president of the Welsh Folk Song Society, the Amy Parry-Williams Memorial Lectures have been delivered annually in Welsh at the National Eisteddfod. A "Lady Amy Parry-Williams Scholarship" was also established at Aberystwyth.
