= Maria James =

American poet

Maria James (October 11, 1793 – September 11, 1868) was a Welsh-born American poet and domestic servant. Her poetry includes Ode on the Fourth of July 1833. As a child, she emigrated with her family from Wales to New York. She would spend most of her life in this state.

From c. 1803 to c. 1810, James was a domestic worker in the residence of Freeborn Garrettson. There she had access to reading material. As an adult, she worked in the nurseries of various households. She composed poetry in her free time, inspired by impressions from her youth. In 1839, a collection of her poems was published by Alonzo Potter.

== Early years and education ==
Maria James was born in 1793, in Wales. She was about seven years old (c. 1800) when she emigrated to the United States with her family, landing at Dutchess County, New York, where her father went to work at the slate quarries.

She was fond of reading the common hymnbook, and the New Testament was her only school book. She heard Joseph Addison's paraphrases of the twenty-third psalm, which she described as the first time that she ever heard a good reader. Her parents moved house, and James found herself in a school where the elder children used the American Preceptor. She found herself entranced by the sounds of their reading of Timothy Dwight IV's "Columbia", the meaning of which she did not understand at the time.

== Career ==
At the age of ten (c. 1803), James's parents arranged for her to enter the family of Rev. Freeborn Garrettson, where she lived until she was seventeen (c. 1810). Besides carrying out household tasks, she had further opportunities for reading. The heads of the family constantly impressed on the children that "the fear of the Lord is the beginning of wisdom" and that to "depart from iniquity is understanding". In her leisure hours, she read from the Female Mentor, two odd volumes of the Adventurer; Miss Hannah More's Cheap Repository; and Pilgrim's Progress.

In her seventeenth year, she left the Garrettsons to learn dressmaking, but it proved unsuccessful as a career. After this, she worked for several households, mainly in the nursery.

In 1833, the wife of Bishop Alonzo Potter, one of the professors in Union College, returned from a visit to Rhinebeck on the Hudson. Mrs. Potter had with her a copy of the Ode on the Fourth of July 1833, which she demonstrated to her husband. She informed him that it was the production of a young woman at service in the family of a friend at Rhinebeck, and who had been in that capacity more than twenty years. Mr. Potter had often noticed James on account of her retiring and modest manners. When he learned more about Maria James, he looked at some of her other poetry. Mr. Potter arranged for her poems to be published, with a preface by him, in a volume entitled Wales and other Poems, by Maria James, published in 1839.

Potter's long introduction to the collection assures readers that Maria James "solaced a life of labour with intellectual occupations," and that "her achievements should be made known to repress the supercilious pride of the privileged and educated." In this way, Potter vindicated, in an admirable manner, against the sneers of Johnson, the propriety of recognising the abilities of the humblest classes.

With respect to some of her early poems, she recollected trying something in this way for the amusement of a little boy who was very dear to her. Except this, with a very few other pieces, no attempt of the kind was made until The Mother's Lament, and Elijah, with a number of epitaphs. Others early verses included Hummingbird and The Adventure. In the summer of 1832, when she heard a reading of Life of Napoleon Bonaparte, by Louis Antoine Fauvelet de Bourrienne, it brought to her mind certain conversations which she heard in the early part of her life regarding Bonaparte. The poem was produced the following summer. In the year 1819, The American Flag appeared in the New York American, signed "Croaker & Co.": fourteen years later, this was her inspiration for the Ode on the Fourth of July 1833. After publication, it was popularly assumed that she had not written the poem without help. Many of the pieces were written from impressions received in youth, particularly the Whippoorwill, the Meadow Lark, the Firefly, and others.

== Death ==
James died in Rhinebeck, New York, in 1868, age 74.
