= Jane Helen Rowlands =

Welsh academic and missionary

Jane Helen Rowlands (Helen o Fôn; 3 April 1891 – February 1955) was a Welsh linguist, scholar and missionary. Educated at Bangor University, Newnham College, Cambridge, St Colm College, Calcutta University, and the Sorbonne, she served in India for the Foreign Mission of the Welsh Calvinistic Methodist Church. Rowlands is also known for establishing a residence for widows and orphaned children. Her two known written works include La femme bengalie dans la littérature du moyen-âge (1930), and the undated The quest : scenes from the life of Chandra Lela.

== Biography ==
Rowlands was born in Menai Bridge, Anglesey in 1891. Her parents were Jabaz, a sea captain (Marianglas, Llanallgo) and Martha (Llanfair Mathafarn Eithaf). She had two siblings, brothers William and Thomas. In her early years, she was influenced by the Reverend Thomas Charles Williams, who ministered at her church. She was educated at Beaumaris Grammar School, Bangor University, and Newnham College, Cambridge.

Rowlands taught French at Beaumaris and at Newtown County School. She became a missionary in June 1915 in the General Assembly held in London. She then gained special instruction at St Colm College, Edinburgh before sailing to India in 1916 on behalf of the Welsh Calvinistic Methodist Church's Foreign Mission. Rowlands lived in Sylhet for the next ten years. Here she taught at a school for girls and learned Bengali. She moved to Moulvibazar in 1927, serving as headmistress and first principal, at Darjeeling's Language School. She was able to attend Calcutta University from this location and earned a master's degree. She then earned the DLitt degree from the Sorbonne (1930). Returning to India, she worked at Karimganj and established a residence for widows and orphaned children. Rowlands died in 1955.

== Selected works ==
- (1930) La femme bengalie dans la littérature du moyen-âge
- (n.d.) The quest : scenes from the life of Chandra Lela
