= Dorothy Simpson =

UK mystery novelist (1933–2020)

- Born: 28 June 1933; Blaenavon, Monmouthshire (now in Wales)
- Died: 20 August 2020 (aged 87)
- Education: Bridgend Grammar School
- Alma mater: University of Bristol
- Occupation: Crime fiction writer
- Writing career
- Language: English
- Genre: Mystery fiction
- Notable work: Last Seen Alive (1985)
- Notable awards: Silver Dagger Award
- Website: dorothysimpson.co.uk

Dorothy Preece Simpson (20 June 1933, Blaenavon, Monmouthshire – 20 August 2020 (aged 87)) was an English-language writer of mystery novels, and a winner of a Silver Dagger Award from the Crime Writers' Association of Great Britain for her 1985 novel, Last Seen Alive.

== Biography ==
Simpson was brought up in South Wales, went to Bridgend Grammar School and then to Bristol University, where she read modern languages. After university, she moved to Kent (the background of the Thanet novels) to teach French at Dartford and Erith grammar schools from 1955 to 1962. She married in 1961 and worked as a marriage guidance counsellor from 1969 to 1982. She began writing in 1975. She and her husband and three children lived in Maidstone, Kent.

== Writing ==
Her first novel was published in 1977, but her next three manuscripts were rejected. She was determined to "devote her next efforts to creating an intriguing murder mystery staged around an engaging sleuth," and came up with her mainstay characters Inspector Luke Thanet and his colleague Sergeant Michael Lineham in The Night She Died, the first of a series of 15 novels. Severe repetitive stress injury forced her to stop writing in 2000.

Simpson died on 20 August 2020, aged 87.

== Bibliography ==
=== Inspector Thanet series ===
- The Night She Died (1981)
- Six Feet Under (1982)
- Puppet for a Corpse (1983)
- Close Her Eyes (1984)
- Last Seen Alive (1985) – winner of a Silver Dagger award
- Dead On Arrival (1986)
- Element of Doubt (1987)
- Suspicious Death (1988)
- Dead By Morning (1989)
- Doomed to Die (1991)
- Wake the Dead (1992)
- No Laughing Matter (1993)
- A Day for Dying (1995)
- Once Too Often (1998)
- Dead and Gone (1999)

=== Other novels ===
- Harbingers of Fear (1977)
