= Catherine Glyn Davies =

Welsh historian (1926–2007)

Catherine "Caryl" Glyn Davies (née Catherine Glyn Jones; 26 September 1926 – 22 February 2007) was a Welsh historian of philosophy and linguistics, and a translator.

== Biography ==
Catherine Glyn Jones was born in Trealaw, Glamorgan, on 26 September 1926. Her father, William Glyn Jones (1883–1958), was a minister, and she was the eldest of four. She attended Porth county school, and in 1946, she graduated with first-class honours in French, before receiving honours in philosophy from the University College of Wales in Aberystwyth. She furthered her studies at the university and graduated in 1949 with a Masters, for which she produced the thesis A critical study of John Locke's examination of Père Malebranche's opinion of seeing all things in God. She spent a year at Sorbonne in Paris after winning a Kemsley travelling fellowship. She studied the philosophic relations between England and France in the late 17th century at Sorbonne, before returning and enrolling at Somerville College, Oxford, where she authored The influence of John Locke on literature and thought in eighteenth century France: a study of Locke's influence on the development of the theory of knowledge in France between 1734 and 1748 in 1954.

Davies married Gareth Alban Davies (1926–2009), whom she had met at Oxford, in the summer of 1953. He taught at the University of Leeds, eventually becoming Cowdray Professor of Spanish there. The couple went on to have four children, Eleri, Rhodri, Catrin and Gwen. She began translating works into Welsh; André Gide's La Symphonie pastorale was translated with her husband in 1965 and published as Y Deillion. As a linguist, she authored two articles on Anton Chekhov's The Student (1894) in 1994–95 and translated Leo Tolstoy's The Cossacks into Y Cosaciaid in 1998.

Davies received a PhD from the University of Leeds in 1989 for a thesis entitled Conscience as Consciousness: the idea of self-awareness in French philosophical writing from Descartes to Diderot contains a concise but comprehensive discussion which is often referred to, first published the following year. In 2000, authored a work on the history of Celtic scholarship entitled Adfeilion Babel: agweddau ar syniadaeth ieithyddol y ddeunawfed ganrif, which according to the Dictionary of Welsh Biography traces the "development of the ideas of grammarians, lexicographers and linguists regarding the beginnings and development of language and the inter-relationship of languages" and discusses the work of the likes of John Davies (Mallwyd), Edward Lhuyd, and Paul-Yves Pezron and Gottfried Wilhelm Leibniz. She continued to research extensively, though in later years was hampered by poor eyesight.

Although the Davies' lived in Yorkshire for three decades, they taught their children the Welsh language. She died in hospital in Aberystwyth on 22 February 2007 from septicaemia, caused by a ruptured gastric ulcer. Her funeral was held at Tabor chapel in Llangwyryfon, before she was cremated at Aberystwyth Crematorium.
