= Tiffany Atkinson =

British academic and award-winning poet, born 1972

- Born: 1972 (age 52–53)
- Occupation: Academic & Poet
- Known for: Recipient of the Roland Mathias Poetry Award

Tiffany Atkinson (born 1972) is a British academic and award-winning poet. In 1993, she moved to Wales, where after completing her studies in Cardiff, she became a lecturer in English and Creative Writing at Aberystwyth University. In 2014, she was appointed Professor of Creative Writing at the University of East Anglia. She was the recipient of the Roland Mathias Poetry Award.

== Biography ==
Born in West Berlin, Germany, to an army family, Atkinson was brought up in Germany and Britain. After graduating in English at Birmingham University in 1993, she moved to Wales, where she gained a PhD in critical theory from Cardiff University. Atkinson then conducted workshops and academic seminars in eastern Europe for the British Council. In both 1993 and 1994, she won the BBC Radio's Young Poet of the Year contest. She became Senior Lecturer in English and Creative Writing at Aberystwyth University, while undertaking research into theories of the body and the history of anatomy, contemporary literature and poetry. She remained in Aberystwyth until 2014, when she moved to the University of East Anglia as Professor of Creative Writing.

== Poetry and writing ==
Atkinson has published three poetry collections: Kink and Particle (2006), Catulla et al (2011), and So Many Moving Parts (2014). Kink and Particle looks back on a thirty-year-old's memories of childhood and adolescence, and glimpses the future. The book gained positive reviews, won the Jerwood Aldeburgh First Collection Prize and became a Poetry Book Society Recommendation. Catulla et al is a modern rendering of the poetry of Catullus. Writing in The Guardian, Patrict McGuinness welcomes the collection as being "in the finest tradition of creative adaptation: keeping the originals as ballast, but unafraid to sail off on their own tangents." So Many Moving Parts, depicting the awkward relationship of body and spirit and their sometimes surprising practical effects, won the Roland Mathias Poetry Award in 2015.

Furthermore, Atkinson has written prose works and edited a collection of essays entitled The Body (2003).
