= Christine Evans =

British poet (born 1943)

Christine Evans (born 1943) is a poet of Welsh origin, born in the West Riding of Yorkshire and writing in English. She lives in North Wales. Her book Cometary Phrases was Welsh Book of the Year in 1989.

== Career ==
In 1967 Evans moved to Pwllheli on the Llŷn Peninsula in 1967 to teach English at Pwllheli County Grammar School, which is now part of Ysgol Glan y Môr. Her father and grandmother had been brought up there.

Evans then married into a Bardsey Island farming family. She currently lives half the year on Bardsey Island, spending winters and doing her writing there at Uwchmynydd (Aberdaron).

While on maternity leave in 1976, Christine Evans started writing poems in English. Her first book, Looking Inland, appeared seven years later. Cometary Phases was declared Welsh Book of the Year in 1989. Her Selected Poems won her the inaugural Roland Mathias Prize in 2005, from the Brecknock Society and Museum Friends, for its "fresh eye and boldness of metaphor, a sense of living on the threshold of other worlds."

She has also written fiction and non-fiction for children and young adults.

== Bibliography ==
- Looking Inland (Seren, 1983, ISBN 978-0907476245)
- Falling Back (Seren, 1986, ISBN 978-0907476634)
- Cometary Phases (Seren, 1989, ISBN 978-1854110022)
- Island of Dark Horses (Seren, 1995, ISBN 978-1854111371)
- Selected Poems (Seren, 2004, ISBN 978-1854113344)
- Growth Rings (Seren, 2006, ISBN 978-1854114020)
- Burning the Candle (Gomer, 2006, ISBN 978-1843236764)
