= Ann Moray =

Welsh singer of Scots-Irish background

- Also known as: Scottie
- Born: 1909
- Died: 1981 (aged 71–72)

Ann Moray (1909–1981) was a Welsh singer and novelist of Scots-Irish background. She was known by the nickname Scottie during World War II, when she sang for patients in battlefield hospitals.

She developed an interest in the folklore of Ireland and Scotland. In 1965, she published a book on the topic of love stories in Celtic folklore. As a singer, she recorded Gaelic music and music inspired by Gaelic legends. Her papers have been preserved by Boston University.

== Early life ==
Moray was born to Herbert Moray Burgess and Gertrude Newton. According to a 1964 article in The New York Times, Moray was of Scots-Irish background, but was raised in Wales.

While biographical information is difficult to find, according to liner notes on her recording, "The Love Songs of Robert Burns" (Spoken Arts #754), she studied music in Vienna.

== World War II activities ==
During World War II, she worked with the Chaplain Corps of the United States Army. She sang unaccompanied in battlefield hospitals, where the soldiers knew her as "Scottie". Maxine Andrews told a story about a soldier who was afraid he was near death, who asked Moray to sing "Abide With Me" at his funeral. Moray assured him that he was not going to die anytime soon, but promised to sing. That night the soldier did die, and "two days later, Ann Moray stood in the rain next to his freshly dug grave on the beachhead at Anzio and sang."

Moray recounted when a field hospital physician had cautioned her against informing a soldier that he had been blinded. This soldier asked her to sing "Smilin' Through" from a 1941 motion picture. The song contains repeated references to "eyes of blue," and the soldier asked her if his eyes "are blue" or "were blue." Moray answered, "were".

== Post-war period ==
After World War II, she continued to study music, and in 1952 gave her first recital at the Town Hall in New York City. She developed a serious interest in the folklore of her homeland, and at a town hall recital in 1954, devoted the second half of the program to songs and legends of Ireland and the Outer Hebrides (Western Isles).

Later in life Ann Moray turned to writing, and is the author of three published novels and a book of short stories. Moray's papers are in the Howard Gotleib Archival Research Center at Boston University.

== Marriage ==
In 1947, Moray married Juan Antonio López de Ceballos y Elizando, a Venezuelan diplomat, in Mexico.

== Selected works ==
=== Periodicals ===
- "Christ Child's Lullaby"—story—Mademoiselle, December 1964, vol. 60, pp. 110–11.
- "Celtic Heritage in Ireland"—Horizon, Spring 1965, vol. 7, pp. 32–39.
- "Tom Tinker Ellis"—story—Mademoiselle, December 1967, vol. 66, pp. 100–01.
- "Magic Mask"—story—Redbook, December 1971, vol. 138, pp. 71–73.

=== Books ===
- Rising of the Lark, 1964.
- A Fair Stream of Silver: Love Tales from Celtic Lore Collected and Retold by Ann Moray. New York: William Morrow and Co., 1965.
- Gervase. New York: William Morrow and Co., 1970.
- Dawn Falcon: A Novel of Ancient Egypt. New York: William Morrow and Co., 1974.

=== Recordings ===
- Gaelic Songs and Legends. Spoken Arts #745 (phonorecord 33 1/3).
- The Love Songs of Robert Burns. Spoken Arts No. 754 (phonorecord 33 1/3).
