= John Rowlands (author) =

British writer (1938–2015)

John Rowlands (August 14, 1938 – 23 February 2015) was a Welsh language author of several novels including Lle bo'r gwenyn ("Where Bees May Be", 1960). He was also a professor of Welsh literature.

== Biography ==
Born in Trawsfynydd, Merionethshire, Rowlands graduated in Welsh from Bangor University in 1959 and went on to lecture at Abertawe/Swansea, Coleg y Drindod, Caerfyrddin, Llanbedr Pont Steffan and Aberystwyth. He retired in 2003 but remained active as an editor, critic and judge. In retirement he worked on creative writing courses at Bangor.

His academic work included editing a major literary series Y Meddwl a'r Dychymyg Cymreig and numerous volumes and papers. He was one of the most prolific judges in the Eisteddfod literary competitions and was probably the foremost critic in Welsh on Welsh. He also contributed a regular column to the magazine Barn and was a wine and restaurant critic.

== Works ==
=== Novels ===
- Lle bo'r Gwenyn (1960)
- Yn ôl i'w Teyrnasoedd (1963)
- Ienctid yw 'mhechod (1965)
- Llawer Is na'r Angylion (1968)
- Bydded Tywyllwch (1969)
- Arch ym Mhrâg (1972)
- Tician Tician (1978)

=== Academic books ===
- Priodas Waed, translation of 'Bodas de Sangre' by Lorca (with R Bryn Williams) (1977)
- Writers of Wales, T Rowland Hughes (1975)
- Profiles (with G Jones) (1981)
- Cnoi Cil ar Lenyddiaeth (1989)
- Ysgrifau ar y Nofel (1992)
- Y Meddwl a'r Dychymyg Cymreig - series editor
