= Fanny Winifred Edwards =

Welsh teacher and writer (1876–1959)

- Born: 21 February 1876; Penrhyndeudraeth, Merionethshire, Wales, UK
- Died: 16 November 1959 (aged 83); Ffestiniog, Merionethshire, Wales, UK
- Occupations: School teacher Children's author and dramatist Welsh language
- Parent(s): William Edwards; Jane (born Jane Roberts )

Fanny Winifred Edwards (21 February 1876 – 16 November 1959) was a school teacher, children's author and dramatist. She was born, lived, worked and died near Ffestiniog in North Wales: her writing was in the Welsh language.

== Life ==
Edwards was born in Penrhyndeudraeth, a large village that became notable, during the war torn years of the early twentieth century, as a manufacturing centre for gun cotton. Her father, William Edwards, was a master mariner: several of her brothers also became sea-farers. Her twelve recorded siblings included the poet William Thomas Edwards (1863–1940).

She attended school in Penrhyndeudraeth, becoming a pupil-teacher and, subsequently, a permanent teacher. By the time of her retirement at the end of 1944 she had taught at the school for more than fifty years.

In the south of the country the Welsh language was in retreat due to the large-scale immigration from England that accompanied industrialisation, and Edwards became conscious of a shortage of appropriate published children's literature, which she remedied for her own purposes by writing short stories that she could read to her classes. During the early twentieth century the polymath-educationalist Owen Morgan Edwards, one of whose varied functions was as a schools inspector, came across her at work and urged her to publish. The result, for Fanny Winifred Edwards, was a sixty-year career as a published author.

Starting in 1902, she published more than 150 short stories in Cymru'r Plant, the Welsh language children's magazine launched by Owen Morgan Edwards at the tail end of the previous century. She also wrote two children's novels, Cit (1908) and Dros y gamfa (1926), which initially appeared in serial form in the same magazine. Five volumes comprising collections of her short stories were published between 1925 and 1951. Edwards also wrote 17 short one-act plays, most of them for children. One of these was translated into English by Margaret Rosser, appearing in 1951 as "Choosing a hat".

She never married. Beyond her writing and teaching, Edwards was active in the North Wales Women's Temperance Union and the Merioneth Historical and Records Society.

Edwards was a committed member of the Nazareth Presbyterian congregation at Penrhyndeudraeth, closely involved in its Sunday School. She died at Ffestiniog on 16 November 1959: her body is buried at Penrhyndeudraeth's Nazareth cemetery.
