= Elena Puw Morgan =

Welsh novelist and children's author (1900–1973)

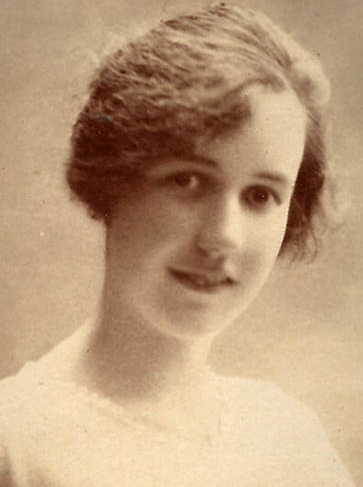
- Born: Elena Puw Davies; 1900; Corwen, Wales
- Died: 1973 (aged 72–73); Corwen, Wales
- Known for: winning Literary Medal at Cardiff National Eisteddfod, 1938

Elena Puw Morgan (1900–1973, née Davies) was a Welsh writer. She became the first woman to win the Literary Medal at the National Eisteddfod, with the novel Y Graith (The Scar) in 1938. In addition to novels for an adult audience, Morgan published Welsh-language children's books.

== Early life ==
Elena Puw Davies was born in 1900, the daughter of Lewis Davies and Kate Davies. Her father was a minister at the town's Independent chapel. She lived her life in Corwen in Wales.

== Career ==
Morgan won the Literary Medal at the National Eisteddfod in Cardiff in 1938, for her short novel Y Graith, as the first woman to be given this honour. Y Graith's heroine struggles with cruelty and poverty at the start of the 20th century. Another novel by Morgan, Y Wisg Sidan (The Silk Gown), was voted Best Welsh Book of 1939 by readers of the Western Mail.

Morgan produced some children's books in Welsh in the 1930s, including Angel y Llongau Hedd (1931) and Tan y Castell (1939). She also wrote stories for the magazine Cymru'r Plant.

Two of Morgan's novels, Y Wisg Sidan and Y Graith, were adapted for television. Y Graith was updated by her daughter Catrin Puw Davies and republished in 2000. Another novel, Nansi Lovell: Hunangofiant Hen Sipsi, about a Welsh Romani girl, was republished by Honno Press in 2018.

== Personal life and legacy ==
Elena Puw Davies married a tailor and poet, John Morgan of Llangadfan, in 1931. The Morgans were friends with John Cowper Powys in Corwen.

Elena Puw Morgan died in 1973. Her granddaughters are Prof. Angharad Puw Davies and Prof. Mererid Puw Davies. She was featured in a display at the Corwen Museum in 2020. Morgan's letters are in various collections at the National Library of Wales.

== Selected bibliography ==
- Angel y Llongau Hedd (1931)
- Nansi Lovell: Hunangofiant Hen Sipsi (1934)
- Y Graith (1938)
- Y Wisg Sidan (1939)
- Tan y Castell (1939)
