= Jane Aaron (educator) =

Welsh educator (born 1951)

- Born: 26 September 1951 (age 74); Aberystwyth, Wales
- Education: Swansea University; Somerville College, Oxford
- Writing career
- Subjects: Welsh literature; Welsh women writers

Jane Rhiannon Aaron FEA FLSW (born 26 September 1951) is a Welsh educator, literary researcher and writer. She was Professor of English at the University of Glamorgan in south Wales, until her retirement in September 2011. She then became an associate member of the Centre for the Study of Media and Culture in Small Nations at the University of South Wales. Aaron is known for her research and publications on Welsh literature and the writings of Welsh women. She was elected as a Fellow of the Learned Society of Wales in 2011.

== Biography and research ==
Aaron was born on 26 September 1951 in Aberystwyth. Her father was the philosopher Richard Ithamar Aaron and his wife Annie Rhiannon Morgan. She graduated in English at the University of Wales, Swansea (1970–1973) and then studied at Somerville College, Oxford, where she gained a PhD in 1980.

In 1993, she was appointed Senior Lecturer of English at the University of Wales, Aberystwyth. She became Professor of English at the University of Glamorgan, Pontypridd, in 1999, remaining there until her retirement in 2011.

Since the early 1990s, Aaron has published a number of essays and books, and edited works for Honno Press, which specializes in the writings of Welsh women. In 1999 she edited Honno's anthology of short stories entitled, A View Across the Valley: Short Stories from Women in Wales 1850–1950.

In 1998, Aaron herself produced Pur Fel y Dur: Y Gymraes yn Llen Menywod y Bedwaredd Ganrif ar Bymtheg, an account in Welsh of the contribution by women to 19th-century Welsh literature. For this she received the Ellis Griffith Memorial Prize in 1999. She also wrote Nineteenth-Century Women's Writing in Wales: Nation, Gender and Identity (2007), for which she was awarded the Roland Mathias Prize in 2009.

== Selected works ==
- Aaron, Jane (1991). A Double Singleness: Gender and the Writings of Charles and Mary Lamb. Clarendon Press. ISBN 978-0-19-812890-8.
- Aaron, Jane (1998). Pur Fel y Dur: Y Gymraes yn Llen Menywod y Bedwaredd Ganrif ar Bymtheg. University of Wales Press. ISBN 978-0-70-8314814.
- Aaron, Jane (1999). A View Across the Valley: Short Stories by Women from Wales, c. 1850–1950. Honno. ISBN 978-1-870206-35-8.
- Aaron, Jane (2010). Nineteenth-Century Women's Writing in Wales: Nation, Gender and Identity. University of Wales Press. ISBN 978-0-7083-2287-1.
