= Emily Rose Bleby =

Jamaican-born British temperance reformer/activist; writer (1849–1917)

- Born: 2 June 1849; Colony of Jamaica, British West Indies
- Died: 3 May 1917 (aged 67); Penarth, Wales
- Other name: (various pen names)
- Occupations: abolitionist; social reformer; non-fiction writer
- Employer: Board of guardians
- Organizations: British Women's Temperance Association; Sons of Temperance; Independent Order of Good Templars; Band of Hope Union; World's Woman's Christian Temperance Union
- Known for: temperance activism

Emily Rose Bleby (2 June 1849 – 3 May 1917) was a Jamaican-born social reformer active in the British temperance movement. She was affiliated with various organizations including the British Women's Temperance Association, Sons of Temperance, Independent Order of Good Templars, Band of Hope Union, and the World's Woman's Christian Temperance Union (WWCTU). Using pen names, she was a frequest contributor to periodicals on temperance and general subjects.

== Early life and education ==
Emily Rose Bleby was born 2 June 1849, in the Colony of Jamaica, British West Indies. She was born into an abolitionist family. Her father, Rev. Henry Bleby (1809–1882), was a Wesleyan Methodist missionary who worked for 46 years in the West Indies; he was also a prolific author. Her mother was Sarah Bassillia (Quarrell) Bleby (1817–?). Three of Emily's brothers became missionaries, John, Richard, and William; other siblings included Henry, Edward, and Alicia.

Bleby was educated chiefly in London, England.

== Career ==
Returning to her early home in the West Indies, she was for some years associated with her father, Rev. Bleby, in missionary, Sunday school, and educational work in the various Jamaican islands, also in The Bahamas and in British Guiana.

Later, she took up her residence in Cardiff, Wales, and devoted herself largely to temperance propaganda and work among the poor. In 1894, described as a "spinster", she was nominated a Poor Law Guardian for Penarth, South Wales, and appointed for Cardiff. (Note: In the May 1896 edition of the Young Wales magazine, Bleby wrote that "domesticity enlarged and enlightened" were the qualifications needed for a woman guardian.) Bleby became a member of the Sons of Temperance, the Independent Order of Good Templars, and the Band of Hope Union. She was made a member of the national executive committee of the British Women’s Temperance Association in 1895, and in 1897, superintendent of the World’s Missionary Department of the same organization. In 1903, she was appointed superintendent of missions for the WWCTU.

Bleby was a prolific writer on educational, social, critical, and political subjects. She contributed under various pen names to British and U.S. periodicals. For literary purposes, she visited Europe, the British colonies, the West Indies, and the U.S. Her last voyage was to South Africa, which was saddened by the death of her sister, Alicia Bleby, who had been for 20 years active and influential in educational work in Cape Colony, who was previously a member of the teaching profession in Plymouth and London, and to whom a permanent memorial was publicly erected in Cape Town.

== Later life ==
In 1912, Bleby began to suffer from Paralysis agitans, and left London for Penarth, residing at 153 Stanwell Road, where she continued to be active for the good of those about her until failing health precluded her from doing so.

Emily Rose Bleby never married. She died at Penarth, Wales, on 3 May 1917.
