= Mary Edith Nepean =

Welsh artist and writer, 1876–1960

- Born: 1876; Llandudno, Wales
- Died: 1960 (aged 83–84); Llandudno, Wales
- Resting place: Great Orme Cemetery

Mary Edith Nepean née Bellis (1876–1960) was a Welsh writer who wrote in English. Her 35 romantic novels mainly have Welsh settings or characters. Nepean was trained as a painter by Robert Fowler, and her paintings were demonstrated in exhibitions. She was a commandant of the Red Cross.

== Biography ==
Born in 1876 in Llandudno, she was the daughter of John Bellis, a county councillor, and his wife Mary. After being homeschooled, she studied painting under Robert Fowler. She later contributed to a number of exhibitions.

In 1899, she married the high-ranking civil servant Molyneux Edward Nepean (1870–1948), with whom she moved to London. Active in public life, she became a commandant of the Red Cross in Kent. She travelled to the Near East and the Balkans, where she developed an interest in the Gypsies of Transylvania.

== Literary career ==
Nepean's first novel Gwyneth of the Welsh Hills was published in 1917. It was somewhat influenced by writings of Allen Raine and Caradoc Evans. Along with another 34 novels, she wrote Romance and Realism in the Near East (1933), based on her travels, and contributed to popular journalism.

== Death ==
Mary Nepean died in Llandudno on 23 March 1960 and was buried in the Great Orme Cemetery.

== Selected works ==
All were published by Stanley Paul of London.

- Gwyneth of the Welsh Hills (1917)
- Welsh Love (1919)
- Cambria's Fair Daughter (1923)
- Bryn Came to the Valley (1946)
- Starlit Folly (1955)
