= Beatrice Green =

Welsh labour activist (1894–1927)

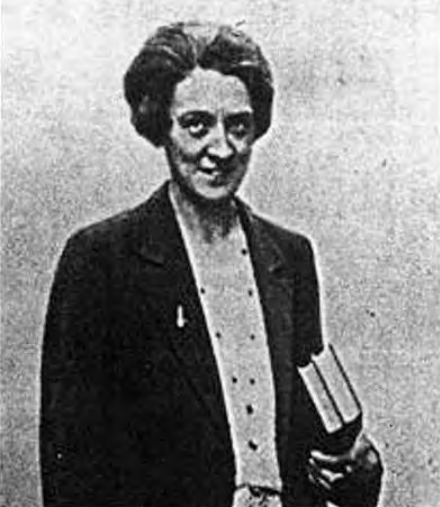
- Green c. 1920s
- Born: Beatrice Dykes; 1 October 1894; Abertillery, Monmouthshire, Wales
- Died: 19 October 1927 (aged 33); Aberbeeg, Monmouthshire, Wales
- Resting place: Blaenau Gwent Church, Abertillery
- Political party: Labour
- Spouse: Ronald Emlyn Green (m. 1916)
- Children: 2

Beatrice Green (née Dykes; 1 October 1894 – 19 October 1927) was a Welsh labour activist who was a key figure in the 1926 United Kingdom general strike and the subsequent miners' lockout. A highly regarded orator and writer, she became a leader in the labour movement in South Wales and was a prominent member of the Labour Party in Monmouthshire.

Born into a mining family in Abertillery, Green initially worked as a teacher before being forced to leave due to the marriage bar upon her marriage in 1916. She became actively involved in labour politics in the early 1920s, advocating for women's rights and birth control. During the 1926 miners' lockout, Green played a crucial role in relief efforts, operating soup kitchens that fed up to 1,600 people daily and helping to foster 2,500 vulnerable children from mining communities. As president of the Monmouthshire Labour Women's Advisory Council, she became a prominent fundraiser and speaker for the Women's Committee for the Relief of Miners' Wives and Children.

In 1926, Green was selected as part of a nineteen-member delegation from the Miners' Federation of Great Britain to visit the Soviet Union, where she studied working conditions and women's rights. Her subsequent reports in Labour Woman magazine praised Soviet achievements in gender equality, though historians later described her assessments as "somewhat naïve". Despite her brief political career, cut short by her death at age 33 in 1927, Green established herself as an influential voice in the Welsh labour movement and was considered to have had significant potential for future political leadership.

== Biography ==
=== Early life and entry into activism ===
Beatrice Dykes was born on 1 October 1894 in Abertillery, Monmouthshire, Wales. The seventh of eight children of William and Mary Dykes, her father worked as a tin worker before becoming a coal miner. The family was directly affected by the dangers of mining life when one of her brothers was killed in a mining accident in 1910. After attending the local church school, she progressed to Abertillery Grammar School before training as a teacher. She became actively involved in the Sunday school at Ebenezer Baptist Church and was regarded as a capable educator.

On 22 April 1916, she married coal miner Ronald Emlyn Green. Despite her reputation as a well-regarded teacher, she was compelled to resign from her position due to the United Kingdom's marriage bar – a discriminatory practice common in English-speaking countries from the late 19th century to the 1970s that required women to leave their employment upon marriage, particularly affecting teachers and clerical workers. This practice would not be abolished for teachers until the Education Act 1944.

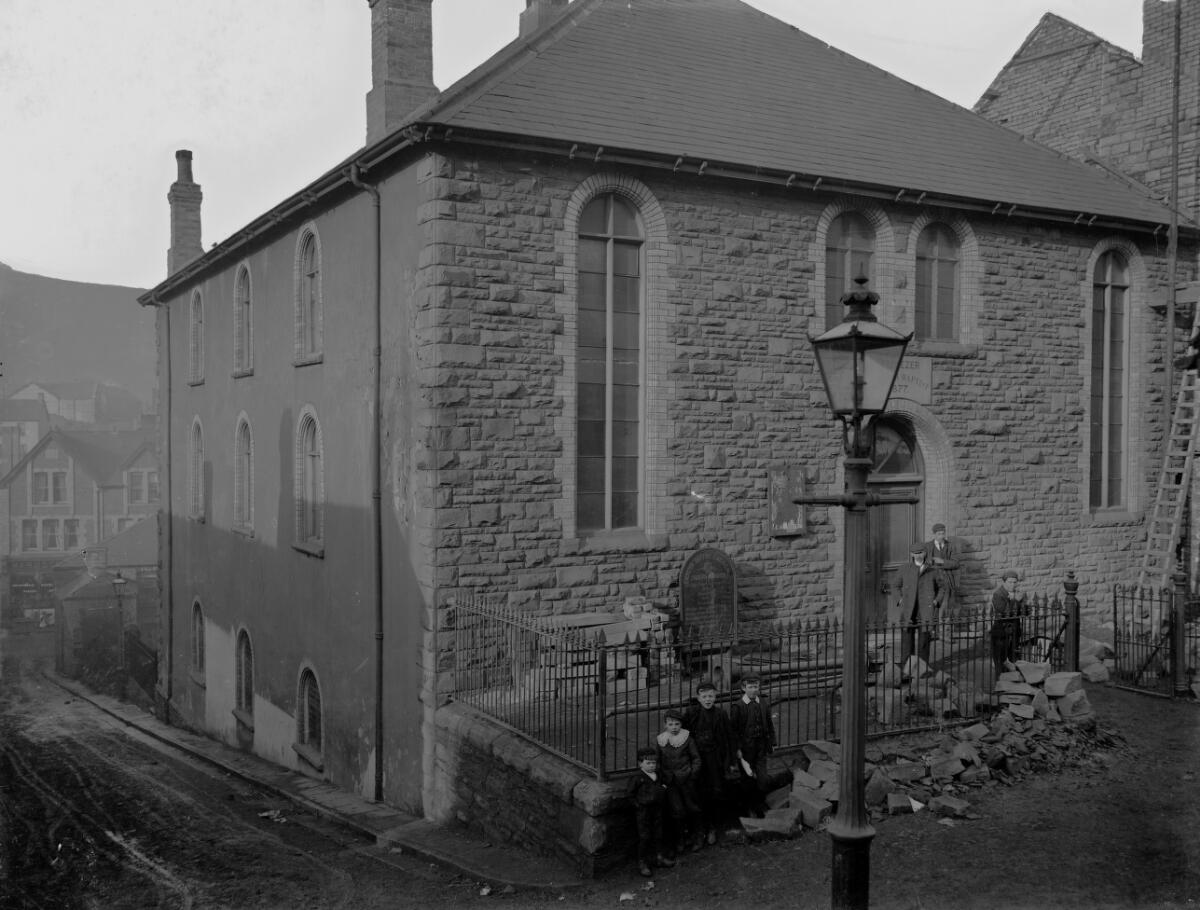
Ebenezer Baptist Chapel, that Beatrice attended

With her husband's parents providing childcare for their two children, Green was able to pursue labour activism from the early 1920s. She delivered her first recorded political speech in January 1921 to the women's branch of the local Labour Party, challenging conventional gender expectations: "For too long the idea has been allowed to circulate that woman's place is in the home, and man's in the world. With the inadequate measure of franchise, woman is realising that politics have a direct bearing upon her home, and that she has to get out in order to put things right". The speech, entitled "Women in the State", was subsequently published in the local newspaper and attracted considerable public attention. Like other female Labour activists in South Wales, Green "did not call for radical transformation of gender roles in society. She did, however, believe that women should gain control over those areas of life which most concerned them and that, to this end, they should engage in public work on the same terms as men".

In 1922, Green became secretary of the local hospital's "Linen League", organising a group of forty women volunteers who washed and supplied the hospital's linens. Under her leadership, the league evolved into a thriving social organisation by 1923, complete with annual membership subscriptions and regular community events. As a "fervent campaigner in favour of birth control", Green collaborated with pioneering advocate Marie Stopes to establish a birth control clinic at the hospital. However, the clinic was forced to close after sixteen months due to "intense opposition" from local clergy, reflecting the broader resistance that birth control advocates faced from religious authorities during this period. During this period, she also began contributing articles to a French socialist magazine, demonstrating her proficiency in the language, and wrote regularly for the periodical Labour Woman.

=== 1926 miners' lockout ===
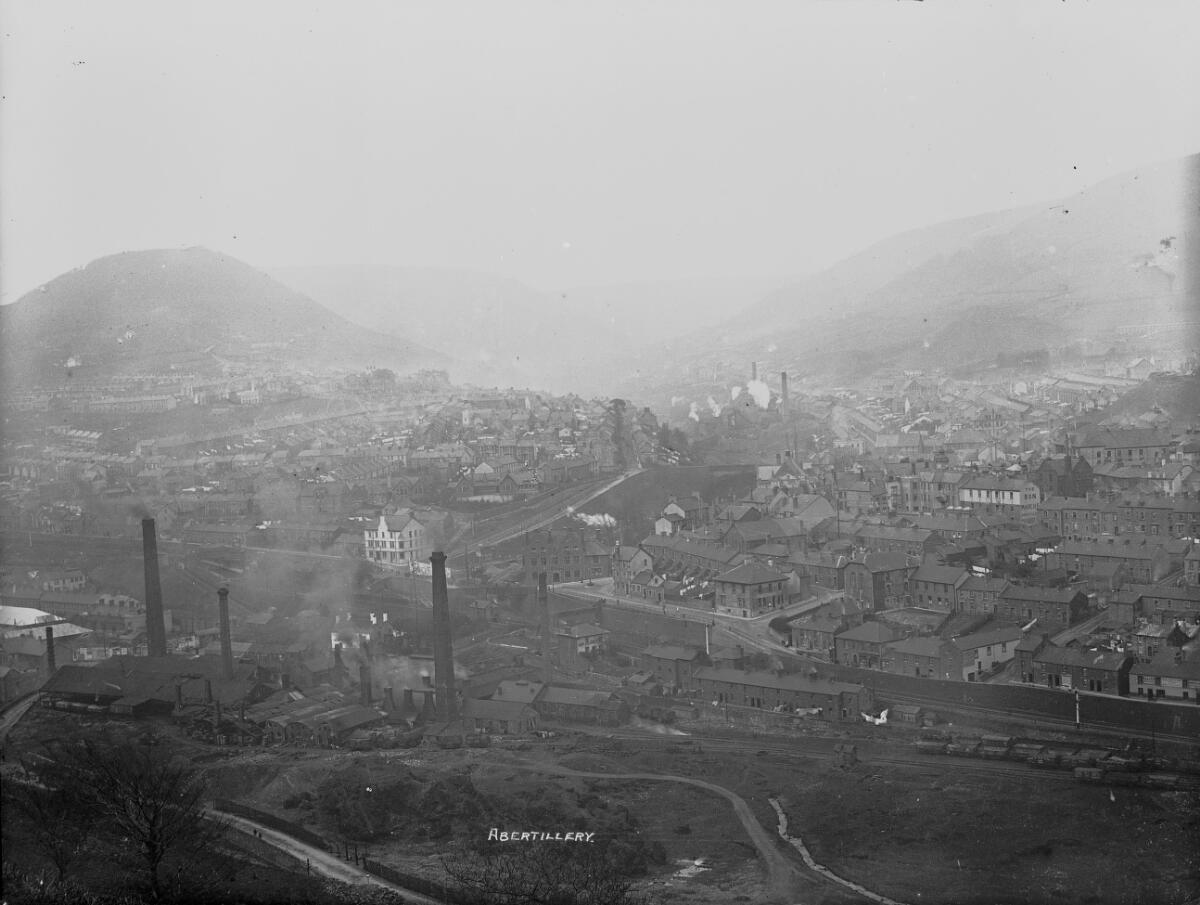
Abertillery, photographed around 1910

Appointed president of the Monmouthshire Labour Women's Advisory Council in 1926, Green assumed a leadership role during one of the most significant industrial disputes in British history. When miners across South Wales demanded improved wages and reduced working hours, mine owners responded with a lockout. The General Council of the Trades Union Congress declared a nationwide general strike in May 1926 to demonstrate solidarity with the miners. Although the general strike lasted only nine days, the miners' lockout persisted for an additional six months, creating widespread hardship throughout the coalfields.

During this prolonged industrial conflict, Green threw herself into fundraising efforts for the Women's Committee for the Relief of Miners' Wives and Children (WCRMWC), an organisation later characterised as an "industrial Red Cross". Demonstrating her considerable oratorical skills, Green conducted multiple fundraising rallies in London on behalf of the WCRMWC, establishing her reputation as a compelling public speaker. The relief efforts attracted international support, with substantial contributions arriving from miners in Canada and the Soviet Union.

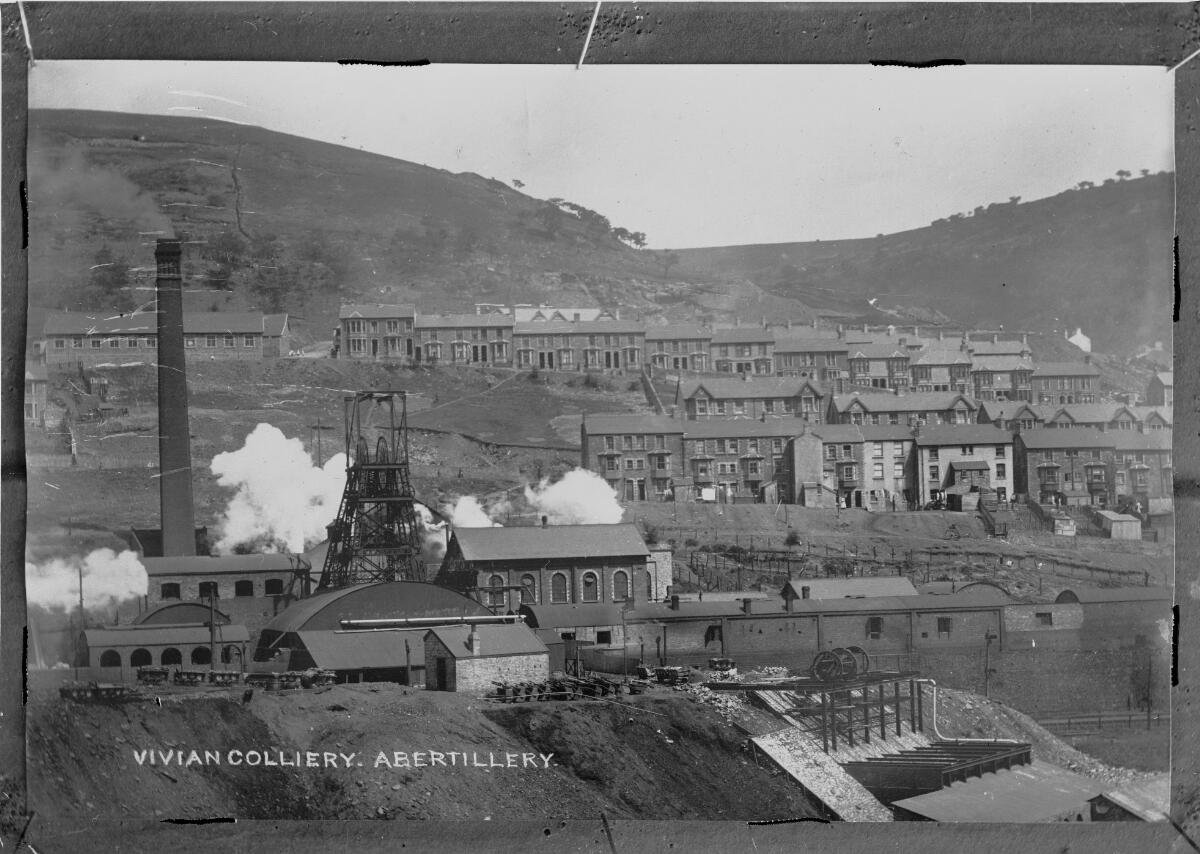
Vivian Colliery, Abertillery, photographed around 1910

The lockout's impact on Abertillery was catastrophic, as the town's economy depended almost entirely on mining employment. The prolonged dispute plunged the community "into economic misery". To address the humanitarian crisis, Green collaborated with Elizabeth Andrews – the first woman organiser of the Labour Party in Wales – to coordinate an unprecedented child welfare programme. Together, they organised the temporary fostering of 2,500 vulnerable children from communities across the South Wales Coalfield, significantly alleviating "the financial burden on their parents" during the lockout period. Green and Andrews personally escorted a group of fifty children from Abertillery and the neighbouring towns of Dowlais and Merthyr Tydfil to foster families in London.

Beyond the fostering programme, Green established and operated a soup kitchen in Abertillery that served up to 1,600 people daily, providing essential sustenance to families facing destitution. She also founded the Abertillery Maternity Relief Committee, supplying essential items to pregnant women and mothers, while advocating for maternity support for imprisoned women. In July 1926, Green provided Labour Woman magazine with a poignant interview describing "what it was like to be a mother of a large family without a waged income coming in". Through her speeches and written contributions, she gained recognition throughout British political circles.

=== Soviet Union tour ===
From 27 August to 16 October 1926, Green participated in a significant diplomatic mission as part of a nineteen-member delegation dispatched by the Miners' Federation of Great Britain to the Soviet Union. The expedition aimed to strengthen relationships between British and Soviet trade unions during a period of intense industrial conflict at home. The delegation undertook an extensive journey of thousands of miles by railway, travelling from Leningrad in the north to Tbilisi in the south, systematically visiting "workplaces, clubs, hospitals and schools and exploring many aspects of Soviet life".

Green demonstrated particular fascination with the coal mines of the Donets Basin, where she drew favourable comparisons between the state-owned Soviet enterprises and the privately owned mines of Britain. The delegation also explored the oilfields of Grozny, examining different models of industrial organisation. Throughout their journey, the British visitors encountered enthusiastic public reception, with large crowds gathering at railway stations. Green seized these opportunities to deliver impromptu speeches to assembled onlookers, describing the ongoing labour struggles in Britain and building international solidarity.

Despite not being a communist herself, Green produced glowing assessments of the Soviet system in two comprehensive reports published in Labour Woman magazine. Her articles focused particularly on women's status in the Soviet Union, enthusiastically contrasting the progressive policies she witnessed with the restrictions of Czarist Russia. She wrote admiringly that women in the Soviet Union had achieved emancipation and "possess an absolute equality of rights with man". While acknowledging serious challenges in regions such as Azerbaijan, where "male opposition to the new equality laws created serious tension and violence", she nevertheless praised developments in Muslim-majority areas, asserting that Muslim women had gained unprecedented personal autonomy. Historian Sue Bruley later characterised these reports as "somewhat naïve" when viewed retrospectively.

=== Later activism ===
Fellow labour activist Marion Phillips – the first Chief Women's Officer of the Labour Party and editor of Labour Woman – observed that the Soviet expedition represented "a crowning happiness in [Green's] life during which she blossomed as a speaker, writer and activist". Upon Green's return to Britain in November 1926, the miners' lockout had concluded in defeat, with the workforce "deprived and starved into submission". Rather than retreating from activism following this setback, Green intensified her political engagement, contributing regular columns to Labour Woman magazine with particular focus on childcare and motherhood concerns.

The Dictionary of Labour Biography later commended Green's distinctive literary approach, noting that "Her articles were written in a simple and accessible style in order to reach her intended – predominately working class – audience. Her approach was informative rather than preachy, practical rather than patronising. The words were those of a working-class woman who knew of the problems surrounding child rearing at a time when economic difficulties ensured there were shortages of all kinds". Her continued prominence within the Labour movement was demonstrated in September 1927, when she served as presiding officer at the Monmouthshire Labour Party women's conference, an event that attracted over 800 delegates from across the region.

=== Death and legacy ===
Green's promising political trajectory was tragically cut short when she died of ulcerative colitis on 19 October 1927 at the hospital in Aberbeeg, aged only 33. Her premature death was attributed to the physical and emotional strain caused by the "harshness and uncertainty" of the turbulent period in which she lived and worked. She was laid to rest at Blaenau Gwent Church in Abertillery, her hometown where her political journey had begun.

Despite the brevity of her political career, spanning less than a decade, Green had "established an impressive political track record and would have had a promising future ahead of her in the labour movement". Biographer Lowri Newman concluded that her exceptional leadership abilities and oratorical skills "would have ensured her a place in Parliament" had she lived longer.
