= John Williams (disambiguation) =

John Williams (born 1932) is an American composer (specializing in film scores), conductor and pianist.

John, Johnnie, or Johnny Williams may also refer to:

== In arts and media ==
=== Actors ===
- John Williams (actor) (1903–1983), English stage, film, and television actor
- Grant Williams (actor) (John Joseph Williams, 1931–1985), American actor

=== Graphic artists ===
- John Terrick Williams (1860–1936), British painter
- John Williams (photographer) (1933–2016) Australian photographer, academic, art critic and historian
- John T. Williams (woodcarver) (1960–2010), Native American woodcarver and shooting victim

=== Musicians ===
- John Williams (born 1932), American composer (specializing in film scores), conductor and pianist
- John B. Williams (bassist) (born 1941), American jazz double bassist, bass guitarist
- John Williams (guitarist) (born 1941), Australian classical guitarist
- John Williams (pianist) (1929–2018), American jazz pianist
- John B (John Bryn Williams, born 1977), English disc jockey
- John C. Williams (baritone saxophonist) (John Charles Williams, 1941-2025), English saxophonist, bandleader and composer
- John David (musician) (John David Williams, born 1946), Welsh pop and rock musician and songwriter
- John Gary Williams (fl. 1960–1990), American R&B singer and member of The Mad Lads
- J. Lloyd Williams (1854–1945), botanist, author, and musician
- John McLaughlin Williams (born 1957), American classical conductor and violinist
- John Overton Williams (1905–1996), American jazz saxophonist with Andy Kirk
- John Williams (music producer) (born 1951), English A&R executive, record producer and songwriter
- Johnny Williams (bassist) (1908–1998), American jazz double bassist
- Johnny Williams (blues musician) (1906–2006), Chicago blues guitarist and singer
- Johnny Williams (drummer) (1905–1985), American jazz drummer with the Raymond Scott Quintette
- Johnny Williams (saxophonist) (1936–1998), American saxophonist with Count Basie
- "Scarface" John Williams (1938–1972), singer

=== Writers ===
- Jed Williams (John Ellis Dowell Williams, 1952–2003), Welsh jazz journalist
- John Williams (author, born 1961), Welsh novelist
- John Williams (satirist) (1761–1818), English poet, satirist, and journalist
- John A. Williams (1925–2015), American novelist
- Sir John Bickerton Williams, English nonconformist author and lawyer
- John Edward Williams (1922–1994), American author, editor and professor, known for novels Augustus, Butcher's Crossing and Stoner
- John Ellis Williams (1924–2008), Welsh novelist
- John Francon Williams (1854–1911), Welsh journalist, writer, geographer, historian, cartographer and inventor
- John Hartley Williams (1942–2014), English poet
- John James Williams (poet) (1869–1954), Welsh poet
- J. Lloyd Williams (1854–1945), botanist, author, and musician
- John Richard Williams (poet) (1867–1924), Welsh poet, also known as J. R. Tryfanwy
- John Sibley Williams (born 1978), American poet and fiction writer

=== Others in arts and media ===
- John Williams (goldsmith), Welsh-born goldsmith based in London
- John Williams (radio personality) (born 1959), American radio personality
- John H. Williams (film producer) (born 1953)

== Businessmen ==
- John Williams (football executive) (born 1939 or 1940), English football executive
- John Williams (winemaker) (born 1953), American winemaker
- John C. Williams (economist) (born 1962), president and chief executive officer of the Federal Reserve Bank of New York
- John H. Williams (businessperson), American businessperson
- John Henry Williams (baseball) (1968–2004), son of baseball player Ted Williams
- John P. Williams Jr. (1941–2019), president of the Greater Cincinnati Chamber of Commerce
- John Stanton Williams (1814–1876), American shipowner and businessperson

== Clergymen ==
- John Williams (Ab Ithel) (1811–1862), Welsh antiquary and Anglican priest
- John Williams (archbishop of York) (1582–1650), British Anglican archbishop of York and political advisor to King James I
- John Williams (archdeacon of Switzerland) (born 1948), Anglican archdeacon of Switzerland
- John Williams (archdeacon of Worcester) (1912–2002), Anglican archdeacon of Dudley and archdeacon of Worcester
- John Williams (bishop of Chichester) (1636–1709), English bishop of Chichester
- John Williams (bishop of Connecticut) (1817–1899), American bishop of Connecticut, presiding bishop of the Episcopal Church, and dean of Berkeley Divinity School
- John Williams (dean of Llandaff) (1907–1983), Welsh Anglican archdeacon of Llandaff and dean of Llandaff
- John Williams (evangelical priest) (1762–1802), Welsh Anglican priest
- John Williams (minister and physician) (1626 or 1627 – 1673), Welsh nonconformist preacher and physician
- John Williams (missionary) (1796–1839), English Congregationalist missionary eaten by cannibals in Vanuatu
- John Williams (New England minister) (1664–1729), New England Puritan minister, famous for The Redeemed Captive
- John Williams (Oxford academic) (died 1613), British Anglican dean of Bangor, principal of Jesus College, Oxford, and vice-chancellor of the University of Oxford
- John Williams (priest, born 1792) (1792–1858), Welsh Anglican archdeacon of Cardigan, scholar, and schoolmaster
- John Williams (schoolmaster, born 1760) (1760–1826), Welsh Anglican priest and schoolmaster
- John Albert Williams (1866–1933), American Episcopal priest, journalist, and political activist
- Chris Williams (bishop) (John Christopher Richard Williams, 1936-2026), Anglican bishop in Canada
- John Elias Williams (1871–1927), American Presbyterian missionary to China
- John Joseph Williams (1822–1907), American Roman Catholic archbishop of Boston
- John Owen Williams (Pedrog) (1853–1932), Welsh Congregationalist minister and poet
- John Tudno Williams (born 1938), moderator of the Presbyterian Church of Wales and principal of United Theological College, Aberystwyth

== Criminals and alleged criminals ==
- John Williams (British mass murderer) (1774–1811), perpetrator of the Ratcliff Highway murders
- John Williams (convict), transported to Van Diemen's Land (now Tasmania)
- John Williams (died 1913), murder convict in the Case of the Hooded Man
- John Allen Williams (murderer) or John Allen Muhammad (1960–2009), American murderer
- Johnny Madison Williams Jr. (born 1951), American bank robber

== Judges ==
- John Williams (English judge) (died 1846), known for the 1830s Tolpuddle Martyr trials
- John A. Williams (judge) (1835–1900), US federal judge
- John Griffith Williams (born 1944), Welsh judge of the High Court of England and Wales
- Hugh Williams (judge) (John Hugh Williams, born 1939), New Zealand judge
- B. John Williams (born 1949), American lawyer and judge

== Military figures ==
=== American military figures ===
- John Williams (Medal of Honor, born 1828) (1828–1886), American Civil War sailor and Medal of Honor recipient
- John Williams (Medal of Honor, born 1832) (1832–?), American Civil War sailor and Medal of Honor recipient
- John Williams (Medal of Honor, 1861) (1831–1899), American sailor and Medal of Honor recipient
- John B. Williams (general), US Air Force general
- John F. Williams (1887–1953), Army National Guard general
- John Foster Williams (1743–1814), Continental Navy officer during the American Revolutionary War
- John G. Williams Jr. (1924–1991), US Navy admiral
- John J. Williams (soldier) (1843–1865), Union soldier, last battle fatality during the American Civil War
- John Pugh Williams (1750s–1803), American Revolution general
- John Stuart Williams (1818–1898), Confederate general in the American Civil War, later US senator from Kentucky

=== British military figures ===
- John Williams (British Army officer) (1934–2002), British army officer
- John Williams (VC) (1857–1932), recipient of the Victoria Cross
- Jack Williams (VC) (John Henry Williams, 1886–1953), Welsh recipient of the Victoria Cross
- John Lloyd Williams (RAF officer) (1894–?), World War I fighter ace
- Sir John Williams (Royal Marines officer) (1823–1911), Royal Marines officer
- John Williams Wilson (1798–1857), English-Chilean sailor and politician

=== Other military figures ===
- John Edwin Ashley Williams (1919–1944), Australian air force officer, murdered in 1944 following "The Great Escape"
- John Scott Williams (1893–1944), Canadian military officer and aviator

== Physicians ==
- J. C. P. Williams (John Cyprian Phipps Williams, 1922–1988), New Zealand cardiologist
- John Ralston Williams (1874–1965), Canadian-American physician
- John Whitridge Williams (1866–1931), obstetrician at Johns Hopkins Hospital
- John Williams (gastroenterologist), British clinical academic researcher
- Sir John Williams, 1st Baronet, of the City of London (1840–1926), physician to Queen Victoria

== Politicians ==
=== American politicians ===
- John Williams (Caswell County, North Carolina) (1740–1804), North Carolina state senator
- John Williams (Continental Congress) (1731–1799), North Carolina delegate to Continental Congress
- John Williams (Pitt County, North Carolina) (1735–1789), American revolutionary from North Carolina, served in state Assembly and House of Commons
- John Williams (Rochester, New York) (1807–1875), US representative from New York
- John Williams (Salem, New York) (1752–1806), US representative from New York
- John Williams (Tennessee politician) (1778–1837), US senator from Tennessee
- John Williams (West Virginia politician) (born 1990), West Virginia state delegate
- John Bell Williams (1918–1983), US representative from Mississippi
- John Cornelius Williams Jr. (born 1938), politician in the state of South Carolina
- Thomas Edward Williams (politician) (1849–1931), Wisconsin legislator, erroneously named John Edward Williams in the 1885 Wisconsin Blue Book
- John F. Williams (American politician) (1885–1963), New York state senator
- John Green Williams (1796–1833), Virginia lawyer and delegate
- John J. Williams (politician) (1904–1988), US senator from Delaware
- John K. Williams (1822–1880), member of the Wisconsin State Assembly
- John M. S. Williams (1818–1886), US representative from Massachusetts
- Pat Williams (Montana politician) (John Patrick Williams, 1937–2025), US representative from Montana
- John R. Williams (1782–1854), mayor of Detroit
- Jack Williams (American politician) (John Richard Williams, 1909–1998), three-time governor of Arizona
- John Sharp Williams (1854–1932), US representative and senator from Mississippi
- John Skelton Williams (1865–1926), US Comptroller of the Currency (1914–21)
- John Stuart Williams (1818–1898), US senator from Kentucky, former Confederate general
- John T. Williams (politician) (1864–1944), Wisconsin state assemblyman
- John Willis Williams (fl. 1873–1875), state legislator in Arkansas

=== Australian politicians ===
- John Williams (Australian senator) (born 1955), from New South Wales
- John Williams (New South Wales colonial politician) (1821–1891), member of the New South Wales Legislative Council
- John Williams (New South Wales state politician) (born 1948), member of the New South Wales Legislative Assembly
- John Williams (South Australian politician) (1824–1890), pastoralist and member of the South Australian House of Assembly
- John Williams (Western Australian politician) (1926–1997), member of the Legislative Council of Western Australia
- B. A. Santamaria (1915–1998), anti-communist activist and journalist who wrote under the pseudonym John Williams

=== British politicians ===
- John Williams (MP for Bedford) (c. 1519 – c. 1561), sat 1554–55
- John Williams, 1st Baron Williams of Thame (1500–1559), Lord Chamberlain
- John Williams (Dorset MP) (c. 1545–1617), English member of parliament (MP) for Dorset, 1604
- Sir John Williams, 2nd Baronet, of Llangibby (1651–1704), MP for Monmouth Boroughs and Monmouthshire, 1698–1705
- Sir John Williams, 2nd Baronet, of Eltham (1653–1723), MP for Herefordshire, 1701–1705
- John Williams (Wales MP), Welsh politician who sat in the House of Commons in 1653
- Sir John Williams (died 1743), MP for Aldeburgh, 1730–1734
- John Williams (died 1751), MP for Fowey, 1701–1702
- John Williams (Macclesfield MP) (died 1855), MP for Macclesfield, 1847–1852
- John Williams (born 1736) (1736–?), MP for Saltash, 1771
- John Williams (Windsor MP) (1766–?), MP for Windsor, 1802–1804
- John Williams (English judge), MP for Lincoln, 1822–1826, Ilchester, 1826–1827, and Winchelsea, 1830–1832
- John Williams (Nottinghamshire politician) (1821–1907), MP for Nottingham South (1885) and Mansfield (1892–1890)
- Jack Williams (socialist activist) (John Edward Williams, 1854–1917), British socialist and unemployed movement activist
- John Charles Williams (1861–1939), MP for Truro, 1892–1895
- John Williams (Gower MP) (1861–1922), MP for Gower 1906–1922
- John Henry Williams (politician) (1870–1936), MP for Llanelli 1922–1936
- John Williams (trade unionist) (1873–?), British trade unionist and politician
- John Williams (Glasgow politician) (1892–1982), British MP for Glasgow Kelvingrove
- John L. Williams (Welsh nationalist) (1924–2004), Plaid Cymru councillor and language campaigner
- John Williams (Weymouth MP) (fl. 1554), MP for Weymouth and Melcombe Regis
- John Williams Wilson (1798–1857), English-Chilean sailor and politician

=== Canadian politicians ===
- John Williams (Manitoba politician) (1860–1931)
- John Elliot Williams (1920–1988), Canadian politician and boat builder
- John G. Williams (Canadian politician) (1946–2024), member of Parliament for Edmonton—St. Albert, Alberta
- John Reesor Williams (born 1930), member of the Ontario Legislature
- John Tucker Williams (1789–1854), Canadian political figure
- John William Williams (Canadian politician) (fl. 1878–1882), member of the Legislative Assembly of British Columbia for Victoria City

=== Other politicians ===
- Jack Williams (New Zealand politician) (John Henry Williams, 1919–1975), Labour Party member of parliament
- John Kenneth Williams, Pakistani senator
- John William Williams (1827–1904), New Zealand politician from Northland
- John Williams (Jamaican politician), Jamaican planter, slave-owner and politician

== Scholars ==
- John Williams (Ab Ithel) (1811–1862), Welsh antiquary and Anglican priest
- John Williams (art historian) (1928–2015), University of Pittsburgh
- John Williams (photographer) (1933–2016) Australian photographer, academic, art critic and historian
- John Williams (bishop of Connecticut) (1817–1899), American bishop of Connecticut, presiding bishop of the Episcopal Church, and dean of Berkeley Divinity School
- John Williams (gastroenterologist), British clinical academic researcher
- John Williams (Oxford academic) (died 1613), British Anglican dean of Bangor, principal of Jesus College, Oxford, and vice-chancellor of the University of Oxford
- John Williams (priest, born 1792) (1792–1858), Welsh Anglican archdeacon of Cardigan, scholar, and schoolmaster
- John Williams (water scientist), member of the Wentworth Group of Concerned Scientists
- John Williams Jr. (university president), former and 12th president of Muhlenberg College
- John Allen Williams (born 1945), American political scientist
- John Beaumont Williams (1932–2005), Australian botanist
- John Burr Williams (1900–1989), early finance theorist; author of The Theory of Investment Value (1938)
- John Davis Williams (1902–1983), chancellor of the University of Mississippi, 1946–1968
- John Ffowcs Williams (1935–2020), professor of engineering at the University of Cambridge, former Master of Emmanuel College
- John G. Williams (ornithologist) (1913–1997), Welsh ornithologist
- John Harry Williams (1908–1966), Canadian-American physicist
- John Henry Williams (economist) (1887–1980), American economist
- J. Lloyd Williams (1854–1945), botanist, author, and musician
- John Tudno Williams (born 1938), moderator of the Presbyterian Church of Wales and principal of United Theological College, Aberystwyth

== Sportsmen ==
=== Association footballers ===
- John Williams (footballer, born 1901) (1901–?), English professional footballer
- John Williams (footballer, born 1960), English footballer
- John Williams (footballer, born 1968), English footballer
- Johnny Williams (footballer, born 1947) (1947–2021), English footballer
- Johnny Williams (footballer, born 1935) (1935–2011), English footballer
- Jonny Williams, Wales international footballer

=== Australian rules footballers ===
- John Williams (Australian footballer, born 1940) (1940–2019), Australian footballer for Carlton
- John Williams (Australian footballer, born 1947), Australian footballer for Essendon and Collingwood
- John Williams (Australian footballer, born 1988), Australian footballer for Essendon

=== Baseball players ===
- John Williams (pitcher) (born 1904; death unknown), American Negro leagues baseball player
- John Williams (first baseman) (1922–1973), American Negro leagues baseball player
- Johnnie Williams (baseball) (1889–1963), Major League Baseball pitcher
- Johnny Williams (baseball) (1918–1986), American Negro leagues baseball player

=== Basketball players ===
- John Williams (basketball, born 1966), American basketball player
- John "Hot Rod" Williams (1962–2015), American basketball player
- John Sherman Williams (born 1963), American basketball player

=== Cricketers ===
- John Williams (Auckland cricketer) (1941–2007), New Zealand cricketer
- John Williams (Canterbury cricketer) (born 1931), New Zealand cricketer
- John Williams (cricketer, born 1878) (1878–1915), English cricketer
- John Williams (cricketer, born 1911) (1911–1964), English cricketer
- John Williams (cricketer, born 1980), English cricketer

=== Gridiron football players and coaches ===
- John Williams (defensive back, born 1942), American-born player of Canadian football
- John Williams (offensive lineman, born 1945) (1945–2012), American football player
- John Williams (running back) (born 1960), American football player
- John Williams (defensive back, born 1974), American football player
- John Williams Jr. (Canadian football) (born 1977), running back
- John Williams (offensive lineman, born 2002) (born 2002), American football player
- John L. Williams (American football) (born 1964)
- John M. Williams (1935–2021), American football coach
- Johnny Williams (American football) (1927–2005)

=== Rugby players ===
- John Williams (rugby league, born 1985), Australian rugby league footballer
- John Williams (rugby league, born 1907) (1907–?), rugby league footballer of the 1930s for Wales and Rochdale Hornets
- John Williams (rugby union, born 1927) (1927–2000)
- John Williams (rugby union, born 1940), Australian rugby union player
- John Williams (rugby union, born 1946) (1946–2024), South African rugby union player and coach
- Jack Williams (rugby union, born 1882) (John Frederick Williams, 1882–1911), Wales international rugby union lock forward
- J. J. Williams (rugby union) (John James Williams, 1948–2020), Wales international rugby union winger
- J. P. R. Williams (John Peter Rhys Williams, 1949–2024), Wales international rugby union fullback
- Johnny Williams (rugby union, born 1882) (1882–1916), Wales international rugby union winger
- Johnny Williams (rugby union, born 1932) (1932–2009), England international rugby player
- Johnny Williams (rugby union, born 1982), English rugby union player
- Johnny Williams (rugby union, born 1996), Wales international rugby union centre

=== Other sportsmen ===
- John Williams (archer) (born 1953), American archer
- John Williams (runner) (born 1941), Welsh runner
- John Williams (equestrian) (born 1965), American equestrian
- John Williams (mixed martial artist) (1940–2015), Canadian martial artist known as Gray Wolf
- John Williams (motorcyclist) (1946–1978), English Grand Prix motorcycle racer
- John Williams (snooker referee) (born 1937), Welsh snooker referee
- Ian Rotten (John Benson Williams, born 1970), American wrestler
- Johnny Williams (boxer) (1926–2007), Welsh boxer

== Other people ==
- John Williams (Surveyor of the Navy) (1700–1784), British shipbuilder and designer and Surveyor of the Navy
- John Williams, engineer of the Montgomery Canal
- John Williams (barrister) (1757–1810), Welsh barrister and legal writer
- John Constantine Williams Sr. (died 1892), cofounder of St. Petersburg, Florida
- John Eddie Williams, American attorney
- John W. Williams (legislative clerk) (1869–1934), American lawyer, clerk of the Virginia House of Delegates
- John Shoebridge Williams (1790–1878), American civil engineer, surveyor-cartographer, and later spiritualist medium
- Sir John Williams (diplomat) (1922–2000), British diplomat

== Other uses ==
- List of ships named John Williams

== See also ==
- J. J. Williams (disambiguation)
- John Williams House (disambiguation)
- John William (disambiguation)
- Jack Williams (disambiguation)
- John A. Williams (disambiguation)
- John B. Williams (disambiguation)
- John C. Williams (disambiguation)
- John D. Williams (disambiguation)
- John E. Williams (disambiguation)
- John F. Williams (disambiguation)
- John G. Williams (disambiguation)
- John H. Williams (disambiguation)
- John Henry Williams (disambiguation)
- John J. Williams (disambiguation)
- John L. Williams (disambiguation)
- John Lloyd Williams (disambiguation)
- John M. Williams (disambiguation)
- John O. Williams (disambiguation)
- John Owen Williams (disambiguation)
- John P. Williams (disambiguation)
- John R. Williams (disambiguation)
- John Richard Williams (disambiguation)
- John S. Williams (disambiguation)
- John T. Williams (disambiguation)
- John W. Williams (disambiguation)
- Jonathan Williams (disambiguation)
- John Williamson (disambiguation)
