= John E. Williams =

John E. Williams may refer to:

- John Eddie Williams, American lawyer
- John Edward Williams (1922–1994), American author and academic
- John Edward Williams (activist) or Jack Williams (c. 1854 – 1917), British socialist activist
- John Elias Williams (1871–1927), American Presbyterian missionary to China
- John Elliot Williams (1920–1988), Canadian politician
- John Elliott Williams or Johnny Williams (1927–2005), American football player
- John Ellis Williams (1924–2008), Welsh novelist

== See also ==
- John Williams (disambiguation)
