= John B. Williams =

John B. Williams may refer to:

- John B. Williams (disc jockey) or John B (born 1977), English disc jockey
- John B. Williams (bassist) (1941–2026), American bassist
- John Beaumont Williams (1932–2005), Australian botanist
- John Bell Williams (1918–1983), American politician
- John Benson Williams or Ian Rotten (born 1970), American wrestler
- John Brodie Williams or Johnnie Williams (1889–1963), American baseball player
- John Burr Williams (1900–1989), American economist
- John B. Williams (general), United States Air Force general
- Sir John Bickerton Williams (1792–1855), English nonconformist author and lawyer

== See also ==
- John Williams (disambiguation)
