= John S. Williams =

John S. Williams may refer to:

- John Sam Williams (born 1966), American basketball player
- John Scott Williams (1893–1944), Canadian air force officer
- John Sharp Williams (1854–1932), US Senator from Mississippi and Minority Leader of the House of Representatives
- John Sibley Williams (born 1978), American poet and fiction writer
- John Skelton Williams (1865–1926), American Comptroller of the Currency
- John Stewart Williams (1911–1964), English cricketer
- John Stuart Williams (1818–1898), American Confederate general and US Senator from Kentucky

== See also ==
- John Williams (disambiguation)
- John Stewart Williamson (1908–2006), American science fiction writer
- John Suther Williamson (c. 1775 – 1836), British army officer
