= John C. Williams =

John C. Williams may refer to:

- John C. Williams (baritone saxophonist) (1941-2025)
- John C. Williams (economist) (born 1962), American economist and central banker
- John Carvell Williams (1821–1907), English nonconformist campaigner and Member of Parliament for Nottingham South and Mansfield
- John Charles Williams (1861–1939), English Member of Parliament for Truro
- John Charles Williams (cricketer), English cricketer
- John Charles Williams (priest) (1912–2002), British Anglican priest
- John Chester Williams (born 1953), American archer
- John Christopher Williams (born 1941), Australian classical guitarist
- John Constantine Williams Sr. (died 1892), co-founder of St. Petersburg, Florida
- John Cornelius Williams Jr. (born 1938), American politician

== See also ==
- John Williams (disambiguation)
