= John O. Williams =

John O. Williams may refer to:

- John Overton Williams (1905–1996), American jazz saxophonist
- John Owen Williams (Pedrog) (1853–1932), Welsh Congregational minister and poet
- John Owen Williams (record producer) (born 1951), English A&R executive and record producer

== See also ==
- John Williams (disambiguation)
- John Owen Williams (disambiguation)
