= Sir John Williams =

Sir John Williams may refer to:

- Sir John Williams, 1st Baronet, of the City of London (1840–1926), Welsh physician and founder of the National Library of Wales
- Sir John Williams (Surveyor of the Navy) (1700–1784), British shipbuilder and designer
- General Sir John William Collman Williams (1823–1911), Royal Marines officer
- Sir John Williams, 2nd Baronet, of Eltham (1653–1723) English politician and Member of Parliament
- Sir John Williams, 2nd Baronet, of Llangibby (1651–1704) Welsh politician and Member of Parliament
- Sir John Williams (died 1743) (1675–1743) English merchant, Member of Parliament, and Lord Mayor of London
- Sir John Bickerton Williams (1792–1855) English nonconformist author and lawyer
- Sir John Hay-Williams, 2nd Baronet (1794–1859) Welsh baronet and High Sheriff

== See also ==
- John Williams (disambiguation)
