= Marse Covington =

- Theatrical release poster
- Directed by: Edwin Carewe
- Written by: George Ade
- Based on: Marse Covington by George Ade
- Starring: Edward Connelly; Louise Huff
- Production company: Rolfe Photoplays
- Distributed by: Metro Pictures
- Release date: July 12, 1915
- Running time: 5 reels
- Country: United States
- Language: Silent (English intertitles)

Marse Covington is a 1915 drama film directed by Edwin Carewe. It is based on the play of the same name by George Ade.

== Plot ==
Covington Halliday, a southern gentleman, is possessed of one vice: gambling. At the age of 30, Covingtoil goes to war, followed by his faithful boy companion and servant, Dan, a black boy of his own age. When he returns home his father and mother are dead and he is the owner of standday house. Dan stays with him after his marriage, indignantly refusing to be set free. About 20 years later Covington, through his passion for cards and the race track, is swindled by two adventurers, Bantree and Daly. Gradually falling into their net, Covington places a mortgage on Halliday house and instead of using the money for legitimate purposes, he is persauded to back certain horses and loses. Unable to pay the mortgage when it is due, Covington and Miss Carol, his grand-daughter, are turned out of his home accompanied by his servant, Dan. In New York he finds that there is no place for a Virginia gentleman who has no knowledge of business and no stock in trade.

Dan is compelled to leave him and finds work in a gambling house. Covington and his grand-daughter are reduced to poverty. She obtains a position where she receives $8 a week, the source of their support. It is here that she meets Arthur Lewis, a young lawyer, for whom she gradually learns to care and bit by bit he becomes acquainted with the sad family history. The colonel, retaining his pride, refuses assistance, especially from a Yankee, even Miss Carol loses her position and they are reduced to stand in the bread lire. It so happens that Bantree has selected Lewis as his attorney, placing great confidence in him and leaving a number of important papers in his care.

Daly comes to New York and sells Bantree, the Halliday house. In a quarrel Bantree kills Daly and insists that Lewis defend him, and while looking through his papers, Lewis finds proof of the swindling of Covington and as a fee for defending him exacta the return of Halliday house to Covington. Restoring the estate to Covington Miss Carol, Lewis asks his reward and Covington decides that all Yankees are not wholly bad and expresses his satisfaction.

== Cast ==
- Edward Connelly as Captain Covington Halliday
- Louise Huff as Martha Halliday
- John J. Williams as Uncle Dan
- Lyster Chambers as Walter Lewis
- Howard Truesdell as Edward Bantree
- Paul Dallzell as Jim Daly

== Reception ==
A contemporary review in the State Journal-Register praised Connelly's performance.
