= John T. Williams =

John T. Williams may refer to:

- John T. Williams (politician) (1864–1944), member of the Wisconsin State Assembly
- John T. Williams (woodcarver) (1960–2010), Native American woodcarver shot by police
- John T. Williams (architect) architect from the United States
- John Thomas Williams (1929–2018), American jazz pianist
- John Towner Williams (born 1932), American composer and conductor
- John Tucker Williams (1789–1854), Canadian politician
- John Tudno Williams (born 1938), moderator of the Presbyterian Church of Wales and principal of United Theological College, Aberystwyth

== See also ==
- John Williams (disambiguation)
