= John Lloyd Williams =

John Lloyd Williams may refer to:

- John Lloyd Williams (botanist and musician) (1854–1945), Welsh botanist, author, and musician
- John Lloyd Williams (politician) (1892–1982), British Member of Parliament
- John Lloyd Williams (RAF officer) (1894–?), British flying ace

== See also ==
- John Williams (disambiguation)
- John L. Williams (disambiguation)
