= John M. Williams (disambiguation) =

John M. Williams (1935–2021) was an American football coach.

John M. Williams may also refer to:

- John M. Williams Jr. (born 1977), Canadian football player
- John McKay Williams (1945–2012), American football player
- John McLaughlin Williams (born 1957), American conductor and violinist

== See also ==
- John Williams (disambiguation)
- Johnny Madison Williams Jr. (born 1951), American bank robber
