= John L. Williams =

John L. Williams may refer to:

- John L. Williams (American football) (born 1964), American football player
- John L. Williams (Welsh nationalist) (1924–2004), Welsh nationalist activist and politician
- John Leonard Williams (1940–2019), Australian rules footballer
- John Lewis Williams (rugby union, born 1882) or Johnny Williams (1882–1916), Welsh rugby player
- John Lewis Williams (rugby union, born 1940), Australian rugby player
- John Lloyd Williams (botanist and musician) (1854–1945), Welsh botanist, author, and musician
- John Lloyd Williams (politician) (1892–1982), British Member of Parliament
- John Lloyd Williams (RAF officer) (born 1894), British air force officer

== See also ==
- John Williams (disambiguation)
- John Lloyd Williams (disambiguation)
