= John G. Williams =

John G. Williams may refer to:

- John Williams (rugby union, born 1946), South African rugby player
- John G. Williams (Canadian politician) (born 1946), Canadian politician
- John G. Williams (ornithologist) (1913–1997), Welsh ornithologist
- John G. Williams Jr. (1924–1991), American admiral
- John Gary Williams, American musician
- John Green Williams (1796–1833), American politician
- John Griffith Williams (born 1944), Welsh judge

== See also ==
- John Williams (disambiguation)
