= List of ships named John Williams =

Seven ships have been named John Williams after the missionary John Williams. All were owned and operated as missionary ships by the London Missionary Society, and were funded by donations from children.

- John Williams (ship), a barque, launched in 1844 and wrecked in 1864 off Pukapuka, Cook Islands.
- John Williams II, a barque, launched in 1865, wrecked off Niue in 1867.
- John Williams III, a barque, bought in 1873, sold in 1894, or 1895.
- John Williams IV, a clipper-bowed barquentine with auxiliary steam propulsion, built in 1893, and sold in 1930.
- John Williams V, a steel-hulled 3-masted staysail schooner with auxiliary power, used in World War II to evacuate settlers and carry supplies, and wrecked in 1948 off Samoa.
- John Williams VI, a coastal freighter, built in 1946, and bought in 1948 for missionary use in the Gilbert and Ellice Islands.
- John Williams VII, built in 1962, based at Tarawa, Gilbert Islands, and decommissioned in 1968.

== See also ==
- John Williams (disambiguation)
