= John F. Williams (disambiguation) =

John F. Williams (1887–1953) was an American army officer.

John F. Williams may also refer to:

- John F. Williams (American politician) (1885–1963), American politician
- John Ffowcs Williams (1935–2020), Welsh engineer
- John Foster Williams (1743–1814), American naval officer
- John Francis Williams (percussionist) or Johnny Williams (1905–1985), American percussionist
- John Francon Williams (1854–1911), Welsh writer
- John Frank Williams (1933–2016) Australian photographer, academic, art critic and historian
- John Frederick Williams (priest) (1907–1983), Welsh Anglican priest
- John Frederick Williams (rugby) or Jack Williams (1882–1911), Welsh rugby player

== See also ==
- John Williams (disambiguation)
