= John J. Williams =

John J. Williams may refer to:

- John J. Williams (baseball) (born 1916), American baseball player
- John J. Williams (politician) (1904–1988), American politician
- John J. Williams (soldier) (1843–1865), last soldier to die in the American Civil War
- John James Williams (poet) (1869–1954), Welsh poet
- John James Williams (rugby) or J. J. Williams (1948–2020), Welsh rugby player
- John Joseph Williams (1822–1907), American Roman Catholic bishop
- John Joseph Williams (actor) or Grant Williams (1931–1985), American actor

== See also ==
- John Williams (disambiguation)
