= Nanking incident of 1927 =

1927 anti-foreigner riots in Nanjing

Nanking Incident
- Part of the Northern Expedition
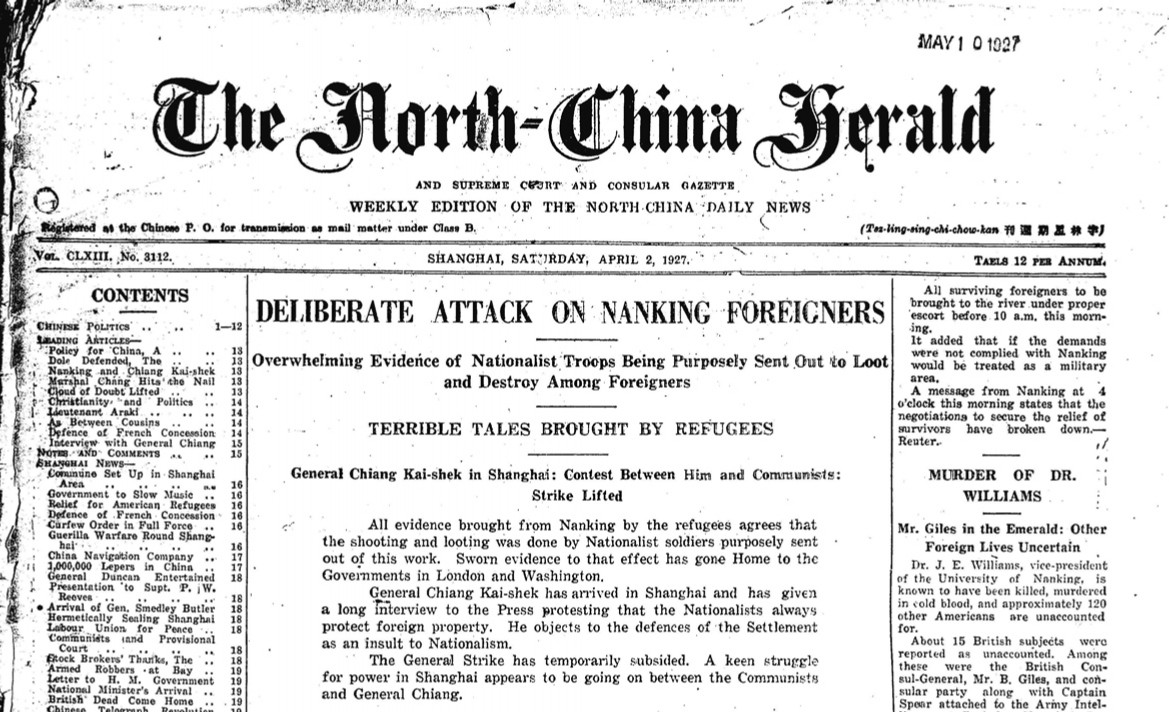
- Report of attacking of foreigners by North China Herald
Date	March 21–27, 1927
Location	Nanjing, Jiangsu, China
Result	Foreign citizens evacuated successfully. Some citizens injured and killed by Chinese forces.

Belligerents
United Kingdom; United States; Empire of Japan; Netherlands; France; Italy	(Republic of China (1912–1949)) National Revolutionary Army

Commanders and leaders
(United Kingdom) Sir Reginald Tyrwhitt; Roy C. Smith	(Republic of China (1912–1949)) Cheng Qian

The Nanking Incident (Chinese: 南京事件; pinyin: Nánjīng Shìjiàn; Wade–Giles: Nan^{2}-ching^{1} Shih^{4}-chien^{4}), also known as the Nanking Outrage or Nanking Massacre, occurred in March 1927 during the capture of Nanjing (then romanized as Nanking) by the National Revolutionary Army (NRA) of the Kuomintang in their Northern Expedition. Foreign warships bombarded the city to defend foreign residents against rioting and looting. Several ships were involved in the engagement, including vessels of the Royal Navy and the United States Navy. Marines and sailors were also landed for rescue operations including some 140 Dutch forces. Both Nationalist and Communist soldiers within the NRA participated in the rioting and looting of foreign-owned property in Nanjing.

== Context ==
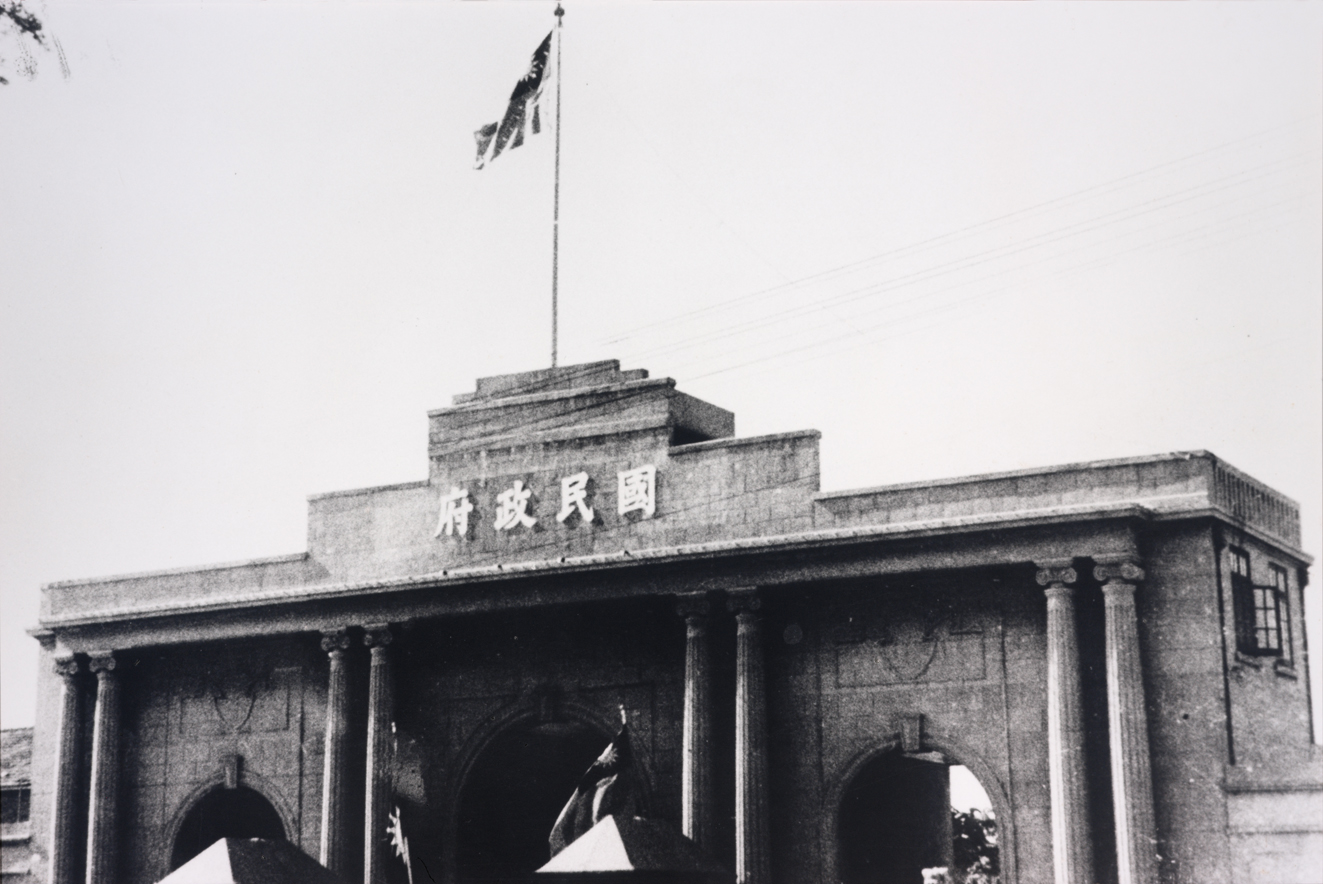
The Nationalist capital building in Nanjing, 1927

Nanjing in 1927 was a treaty port located on the southern shores of the Yangtze River, a large waterway that separates northern and southern China. Because the foreign interests in China were largely American and European, squadrons of foreign naval vessels were stationed along the Yangtze to protect their citizens doing business at the treaty ports. The British Royal Navy operated the China Station under Rear Admiral Sir Reginald Tyrwhitt and the United States Navy the Yangtze Patrol; both lasted for around 80 years until World War II.

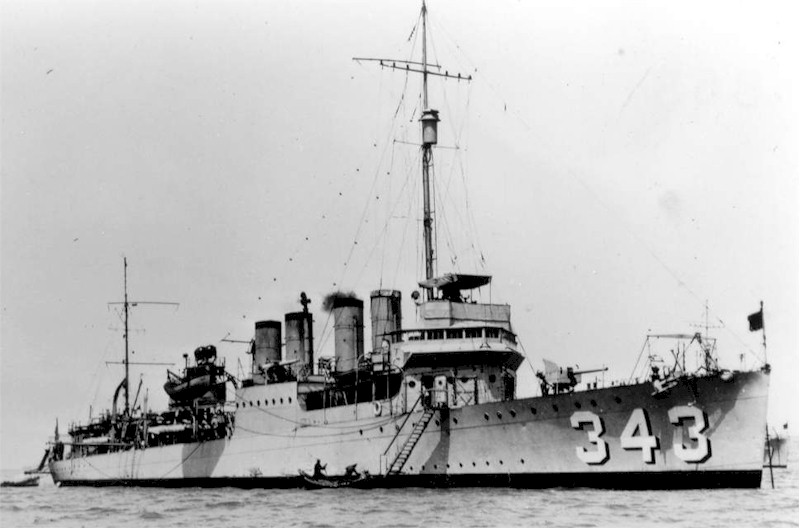
The American destroyer USS Noa.

== Incident ==
On 23 March 1927, with the rapidly approaching National Revolutionary Army (NRA) about to reach Nanjing, Beiyang warlord Zhang Zongchang gave orders for his defeated troops to withdraw from the city. Some of his soldiers who were unable to retreat in time deserted and began to loot foreign properties and attacked two foreigners who were in their way.

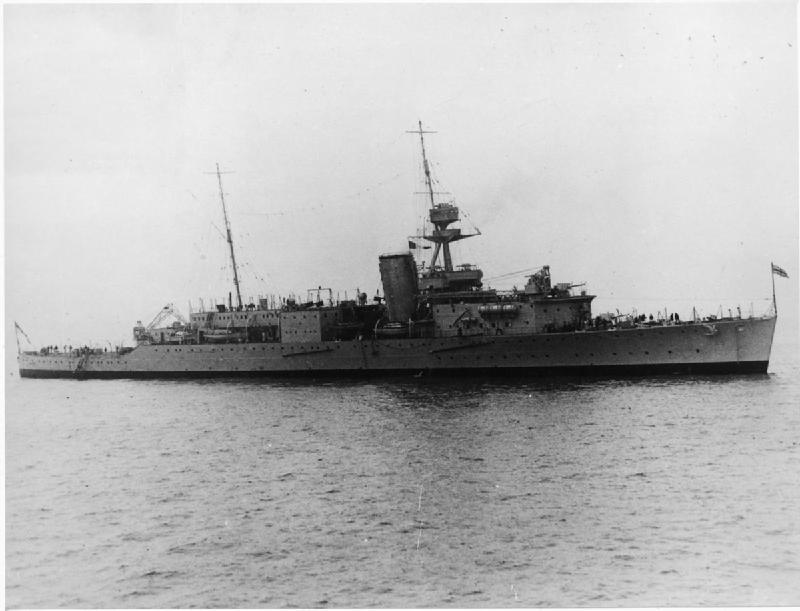
The British cruiser HMS Vindictive

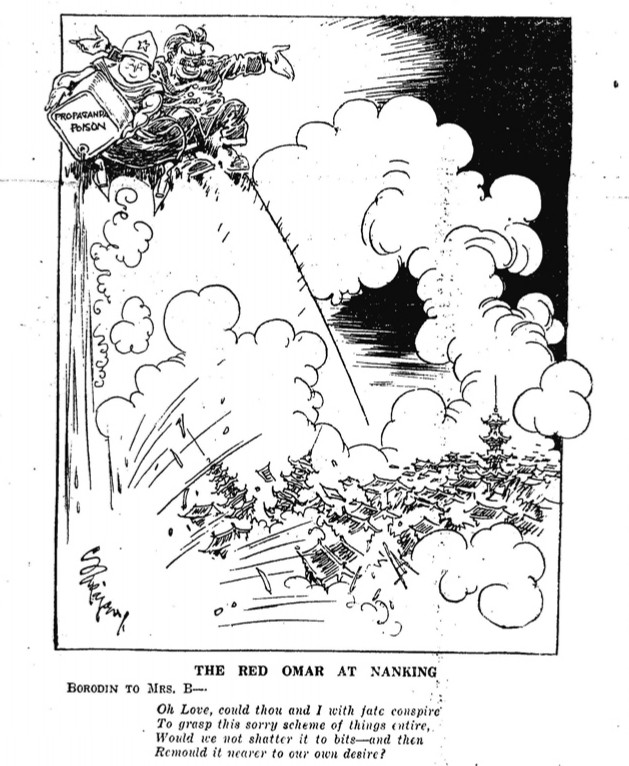
Cartoon critiquing Soviet advisor Mikhail Borodin's communist influence during the Nanking Incident.

In the early morning of 24 March, the NRA began to enter Nanjing without any resistance from Zhang Zongchang's army. Afterwards they entered the British, American and Japanese consulates to search for suspected enemies hiding inside, but left peacefully after none were found. But immediately afterwards, uniformed soldiers and local Chinese residents started large-scale rioting against foreign interests, burning houses and attacking the British, American and Japanese consulates, and killing the American vice president of Nanking University, Dr. John Elias Williams, while almost assassinating the Japanese consul. The 6th Army of the NRA, with its large contingent of communist soldiers, systematically looted the homes and businesses of the foreign residents, and one American, two Britons, one French citizen, an Italian, and a Japanese were killed by Chinese soldiers. Chinese snipers also targeted the American consul and marines who were guarding him, which forced them to flee into "Socony Hill" (So named because of property belonging to the Standard Oil Company of New York) where American citizens were sheltering. During this mayhem, one Chinese soldier declared, "we don't want money, anyway, we want to kill."

In response, the British navy immediately sent the heavy cruiser HMS Vindictive, the light cruisers HMS Carlisle, Caradoc and Emerald, the minesweeper HMS Petersfield, the gunboat Gnat, and the destroyers HMS Witherington, Wolsey, Wishart, Veteran, Verity and Wild Swan toward Nanjing. The gunboat HMS Aphis arrived toward the end of the engagement, and HMS Cricket was also involved in the naval operations at the time. Five American destroyers were also sent to engage the NRA; including USS Noa under Roy C. Smith, William B. Preston, John D. Ford, Pillsbury and Simpson. The Italian Regia Marina sent the gunboat Ermanno Carlotto.

At 3:38 pm, the NRA soldiers and Chinese rioters were driven off by high explosive rounds and machine gun fire from Emerald, Wolsey, Noa, Preston and Carlotto, and other warships may have participated in the bombardment as well. After the bombardment, foreign civilians hiding on Sacony Hill were rescued by sailors from Noa and Preston. The two American vessels fired 67 shells by this point and thousands of rifle and machine gun rounds.

By the end of March 24, Nanjing was burning and littered with bomb craters and casualties from the battle. Early the next morning, just before dawn, USS William B. Preston was lifting anchor to escort SS Kungwo out of the area. She was filled with evacuees and needed protection, but just as the two ships were starting to leave, sniper fire from the riverbanks hit Preston. The Americans returned fire with their Lewis gun and silenced the attackers after a few moments.

Three hours later, as the two vessels steamed down the river, Preston was attacked again. This time, the two ships were in between Silver Island and Fort Hsing-Shan. Rifle fire was first heard, and Preston′s crew were preparing their machine gun when 3-inch (76 mm) guns at the fort suddenly engaged them. Several shots missed the ships, but one eventually hit Preston′s fire control platform, causing no casualties. A 4-inch (100 mm) gun was then aimed at the fort, and after a few rounds the Chinese guns were silenced.

After turning Kungwo over to the British, William B. Preston returned to Nanjing and later joined HMS Cricket and SS Wen-chow, 52 mi (84 km) south of Zhenjiang. Snipers once again harassed the ships, but machine gun fire from Cricket quickly forced the Chinese to retreat. Later on the Japanese sent the gunboats Hodero, Katata, Momo and Shinoki. The Italians sent the gunboat Ermanno Carlotto, the Dutch sent the light cruiser HNLMS Sumatra and the French sent aviso La Marne for the evacuation of their citizens in Nanjing.

By March 26, NRA commander Cheng Qian restored order in Nanjing and successfully restrained soldiers from further hostile actions against foreign forces, while requesting the Red Cross to mediate a cease fire with foreign naval vessels. On March 27, with 70 more refugees aboard, Preston left Nanjing and headed downriver. Lieutenant Commander G. B. Ashe later recalled that the Chinese had emplaced a field-piece at a river bend outside of Nanjing so he ordered general quarters well in advance of the battery, but when the ship went around the bend the Chinese did not fire. By the end of that day all hostilities ended. About 40 people were killed in total. One British sailor was killed, Able Seaman John Knox from the Emerald, and there was only one American casualty, fireman Ray D. Plumley. American forces involved in the Nanking Incident received the Yangtze Service Medal. Three U.S. Navy signalmen who maintained consular communications from the building's roof while under continuous fire were also awarded the Navy Cross.

== Aftermath ==
Afterwards, the Nationalist Government issued a statement blaming deserters from Zhang Zongchang's army for starting the attacks on the foreign consulates, and also accused the Communist soldiers in the NRA of committing atrocities which were wrongly assigned to the Kuomintang.

NRA commander-in-chief Chiang Kai-shek suspected that the Chinese Communist Party and Soviet advisors in the Wuhan Nationalist Government used anti-imperialist and anti-foreign sentiments to instigate the Nanking incident, strengthen the Communist position, and damage the right-wing faction of the Kuomintang. He therefore decided to purge all Communists from the Kuomintang in Shanghai in the violent April 12 Incident. This explicitly ended the First United Front between the CCP and KMT and commenced the Chinese Civil War.

In 1928, Huang Fu, foreign minister of the newly formed Nationalist government in Nanjing, reached agreements with the United States and Great Britain to settle the damages caused by the Nanking incident, and the Kuomintang agreed to apologize and pay significant compensation to both countries without disclosing the exact sum. Although the Kuomintang suffered financial loss as a result of this settlement, the Nationalist government did receive international recognition and established formal diplomatic relationship with two of the world's great powers for the first time after the Northern Expedition.

== Literature ==
- Edna Lee Booker, News Is My Job, (The Macmillan Company, 1940)
- Alice Tisdale Hobart, Within the Walls of Nanking (Macmillan, 1929)
- United States Naval Institute Proceedings, January 1928 – the account of the Lieutenant Commander Roy C. Smith Jr., the officer in charge of the USS Noa.
- Kemp Tolley, Yangtze Patrol, (US Naval Institute, 2000)

== See also ==
- Pearl S. Buck
- Boxer Rebellion
- Hankou incident
- Jinan incident
- Tongzhou mutiny
