= John W. Williams =

John W. Williams may refer to:

- John W. Williams (legislative clerk) (1869–1934), American legislative clerk in Virginia
- John Whitridge Williams (1866–1931), American obstetrician
- John William Williams (1827–1904), New Zealand politician
- John William Williams, elected for Victoria City in the 1878 British Columbia general election
- John Williams Wilson (1798–1857), British-Chilean sailor and politician

== See also ==
- John Williams (disambiguation)
