= John William =

John William may refer to:

== Given name ==
- John William, Duke of Jülich-Cleves-Berg (1562–1609)
- Johann Wilhelm, Duke of Saxe-Weimar (1530–1573)

== People ==
- John William, Baron Ripperda (1680–1737), political adventurer and Spanish prime minister
- John William (MP for Dartmouth), see Dartmouth
- John William (MP for Southwark), see Southwark

== See also ==
- John Williams (disambiguation)
