= John Henry Williams =

John Henry Williams may refer to:

- John Henry Williams (baseball) (1968–2004), American businessperson
- John Henry Williams (economist) (1887–1980), American economist
- John Henry Williams (New Zealand politician) or Jack Williams (1918–1975), New Zealand Member of Parliament
- John Henry Williams (politician) (1869–1936), Welsh Member of Parliament
- John Henry Williams (soldier) or Jack Williams (1886–1953), Welsh soldier

== See also ==
- John Williams (disambiguation)
- John H. Williams (disambiguation)
