= Jonathan Williams =

Jonathan, Johnathan, or Jon Williams may refer to:

== Arts and entertainment ==
- Jonathan Williams (antiquary) (died 1829), Welsh antiquary
- Jonathan Williams (poet) (1929–2008), American poet, publisher, essayist, and photographer
- Jonathan Williams (horn player) (born 1957), British horn player
- Jonathan Williams (pianist) (born 1974), American pianist, songwriter and vocalist
- Jonathan Williams (filmmaker), Canadian web series creator, writer and director
- Jon Williams, video game programmer, creator of Jet-Boot Jack
- A pseudonym used by science fiction author Walter Jon Williams when writing historical fiction

== Sports ==
=== Basketball ===
- Johnathan Williams (born 1995), American basketball player who has played in the NBA
- Jonathan Williams (basketball, born 1995), American basketball player who played in college at Toledo
- Jonathan Williams (basketball, born 1996), American basketball player who played in college at VCU

=== Gridiron football ===
- Jon Williams (American football) (born 1961), American football player
- Jonathan Williams (running back, born 1988), American football player in the Canadian Football League
- Jonathan Williams (running back, born 1994), American football player in the National Football League
- Jonathan Williams (defensive lineman) (born 1985), American football defensive lineman in the Canadian Football League

=== Other sports ===
- Jonathan Williams (hurdler) (born 1983), American hurdler who has represented Belize
- Jonny Williams (born 1993), Wales international footballer
- Jonathan Williams (racing driver) (1942–2014), Formula 1 driver

== Other ==
- Jonathan Williams (engineer) (1751–1815), American businessman, military figure, politician, writer and engineer
- Jonathan Williams (priest) (born 1960), Welsh Anglican priest
- Jonathan Williams (Vermont politician)
- Jonathan "Caveman" Williams, person killed in the 2003 John McDonogh High School shooting

== See also ==
- John Williams (disambiguation)
