= John H. Williams =

John H. Williams may refer to:

- John H. Williams (businessperson), American businessperson
- John H. Williams (film producer) (born 1953), American film producer
- John Harry Williams (1908–1966), Canadian-American physicist
- John Hartley Williams (1942–2014), English poet
- John Henry Williams (baseball) (1968–2004), American businessperson
- John Henry Williams (economist) (1887–1980), American economist
- John Henry Williams (New Zealand politician) or Jack Williams (1919–1975), New Zealand Member of Parliament
- John Henry Williams (politician) (1870–1936), Welsh Member of Parliament
- John Henry Williams (soldier) or Jack Williams (1886–1953), Welsh soldier
- John Hugh Williams (born 1939), New Zealand judge

== See also ==
- John Hay-Williams (1794–1859), Welsh baronet
- John Williams (disambiguation)
- John Henry Williams (disambiguation)
