= John P. Williams =

John P. Williams may refer to:

- John P. Williams Jr. (fl. 1966–2001), American businessperson
- John Patrick Williams (born 1937), American politician
- John Pugh Williams (c. 1750 – 1803), American militia officer and politician

== See also ==
- John Williams (disambiguation)
