= USS Haddo (SSN-604) =

Submarine of the United States

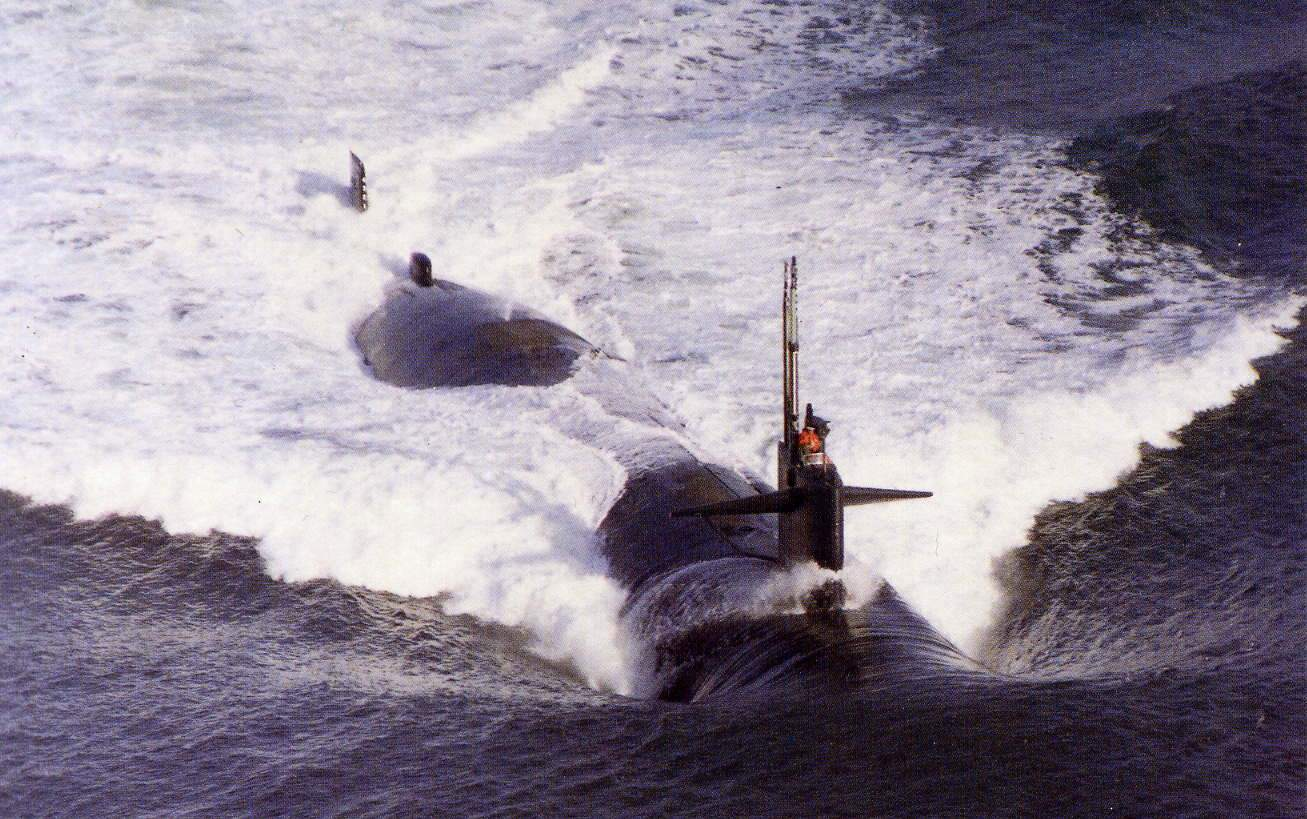
- USS Haddo (SSN-604)

History

United States
- Name: USS Haddo
- Ordered: 3 March 1959
- Builder: New York Shipbuilding Corporation
- Laid down: 9 September 1960
- Launched: 18 August 1962
- Commissioned: 16 December 1964
- Decommissioned: 12 June 1991
- Stricken: 12 June 1991
- Fate: Disposed of by submarine recycling
- Notes: Ship's motto: 'En Garde' (On [your] guard)

General characteristics
- Class & type: Permit-class submarine
- Displacement: 3,700 tons surfaced, 4300 tons submerged
- Length: 278 ft 6 in (84.89 m)
- Beam: 31 ft 8 in (9.65 m)
- Propulsion: S5W reactor
- Speed: 20 knots
- Complement: 100 officers and men
- Armament: 4 × 21 in (533 mm) torpedo tubes

USS Haddo (SSN-604), a Permit-class submarine, was the second ship of the United States Navy to be named for the haddo, a pink salmon fish prevalent on the Pacific coast of the United States and Canada.

The contract to build her was awarded to New York Shipbuilding Corporation in Camden, New Jersey, on 3 March 1959 and her keel was laid down on 9 September 1960. She was launched on 18 August 1962 sponsored by Mrs. Henry M. Jackson, and commissioned on 16 December 1964 at 1125 am EST, with Commander John G. Williams, Jr. in command.

After shakedown out of New London, Connecticut, in January 1965, Haddo arrived at her home port, Charleston, South Carolina, on 8 February and joined Submarine Squadron 4. She operated off the Atlantic coast and in the Caribbean Sea until departing Charleston on 7 July for the Mediterranean Sea. She participated in numerous exercises with ships of the Sixth Fleet and NATO countries before returning home 7 November. Haddo has continued this pattern of service, alternating operations out of home port in the Atlantic with Sixth Fleet deployments, through 1967.

On May 17, 1969 Haddo launched a UUM-44 SUBROC for viewing by President Richard Nixon's Armed Forces Day visit to the USS Saratoga (CV-60).

During the summer of 1965 Haddo became the first ship of her class to be deployed to the Mediterranean Sea with the U.S. Sixth Fleet. For operations during a period in 1966, Haddo was awarded the Navy Unit Commendation and was awarded the Meritorious Unit Commendation for operations conducted during a period in 1967. As a result of the outstanding teamwork and many long hours of training and operations during fiscal years 1968 and 1969, Haddo was awarded the Battle Efficiency "E" for Excellence. Haddo received an eighteen-month "subsafe" overhaul at Charleston Naval Shipyard from August 1969 to April 1970. Following overhaul, Haddo's home port changed to New London, Connecticut, where she became a member of Submarine Squadron 10. Haddo operated out of New London from 1971 to 1973. In the spring of 1972, Haddo completed the first six-month Mediterranean deployment for an SSN. In the fall of 1972, she again deployed to the Med, returning just prior to Christmas.

From August 1973 until December 1975, Haddo underwent an extensive refueling overhaul at Ingalls Shipyard in Pascagoula, Mississippi. After transiting the Panama Canal on 13 February 1976, Haddo's homeport shifted to San Diego, California and joined the Pacific Fleet as a member of Submarine Squadron 3

In the spring of 1977, Haddo departed for the Western Pacific, returning in the fall after an arduous six-month deployment, her crew was awarded the Navy Expeditionary Medal. During the first three months of 1978, Haddo accomplished an intensive Selected Restricted Availability at Puget Sound Naval Shipyard in Bremerton, Washington. In December 1978, Haddo again deployed to the Western Pacific, visited New Zealand and returned in 1979.

Haddo arrived in Mare Island Naval Shipyard for another intensive Selected Restricted Availability in February 1980. In August of the same year she deployed to the Indian Ocean, visited HMAS Stirling in Western Australia from 16–22 December 1980, and returned to San Diego in February 1981. Also in 1980, during weekly operations off the coast of San Diego, Haddo participated in filming a key pivotal scene in the movie Raise the Titanic where she is seen surfacing as part of a surprise deterrent when the Russian Captain Petrov attempted a takeover of the salvaged liner.

In July 1981, Haddo deployed to the Western Pacific, visited Japan and returned to San Diego in late October 1981. Haddo arrived at Mare Island Naval Shipyard in April 1982 and underwent an extensive modernization and overhaul in January 1984, returning to San Diego.

From February to August 1985, Haddo again deployed to the Western Pacific visiting Japan and Hong Kong. As a result of her successful deployment, and superb operational reliability, Haddo was again awarded the Battle Efficiency "E" for Excellence for 1985. Haddo underwent an intensive Selective Restricted Availability in October 1985 in San Diego. Haddo then deployed to the Western Pacific from August 1986 to February 1987, again visiting Japan and Hong Kong. She completed several months of successful local operations before undergoing her last Selected Restricted Availability in San Diego from January to March 1988.

Haddo conducted a two-month ASW operation in June and July 1988. From February 1989 until February 1990, Haddo was deployed from San Diego over 300 days, conducting intensive operations in support of the National Defense, including a six-month deployment to the Western Pacific visiting Korea, Japan, Hong Kong and the Philippines. During her last of six WESTPACs, she also completed the longest continuously submerged period in her 25-year history. In the fall-winter of 1989 and 1990, Haddo participated in the largest Pacific Fleet naval exercise since 1945, PACEX-89, and conducted a two-month ASW operation in the northern Pacific.

Haddo was decommissioned and stricken from the Naval Vessel Register on 12 June 1991. Ex-Haddo entered the Nuclear Powered Ship and Submarine Recycling Program in Bremerton, Washington, and on 20 June 1992 ceased to exist.

== Bibliography ==
- Friedman, Norman (1994). US Submarines since 1945: An Illustrated Design History. Naval Institute Press. ISBN 1-55750-260-9.
- Red November, Inside the Secret U.S. Soviet Submarine War
