= John A. Williams (disambiguation) =

John A. Williams (1925–2015) was an African-American author, journalist, and academic.

John A. Williams may also refer to:

- John A. Williams (judge) (1835–1900), American judge
- John Alan Williams (born 1960), American football player
- John Albert Williams (1866–1933), American Episcopal priest, journalist, and activist
- John Allen Williams (born 1945), American political scientist
- John Allen Williams (murderer) or John Allen Muhammad (1960–2009), American murderer

== See also ==
- John Williams (disambiguation)
