= John D. Williams =

John D. Williams may refer to:

- John David Williams or John David (born 1946), Welsh bassist and songwriter
- John Davis Williams (1902–1983), American academic administrator
- John Douglas Williams (born 1948), Australian politician

== See also ==
- John Williams (disambiguation)
