= John Williams (missionary) =

English missionary

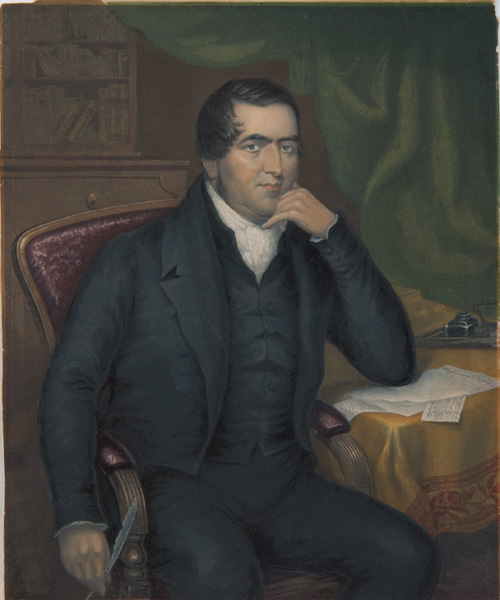
- Painting by George Baxter, 1843
- Born: 27 June 1796; Tottenham, England
- Died: 20 November 1839 (aged 43); Erromango, New Hebrides

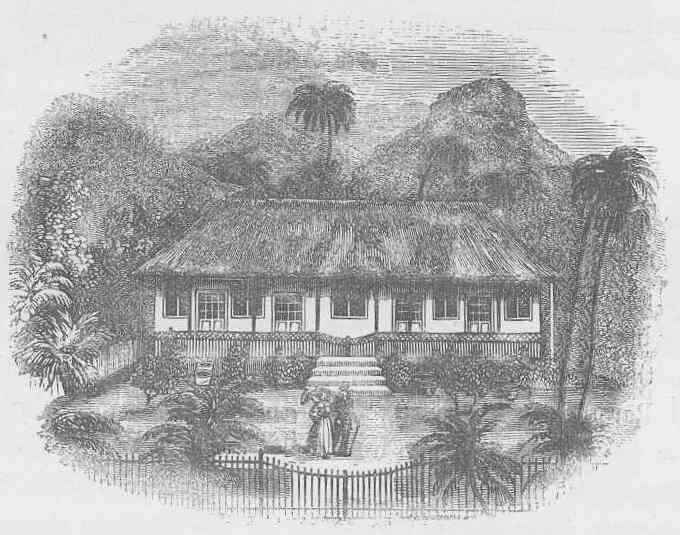
House of the Rev. John Williams, Raiatea

John Williams (29 June 1796 – 20 November 1839) was an English missionary, active in the South Pacific.

== Early life ==
He was born in Tottenham, near London, to Welsh parents. In 1810 the family moved to north London and there he served as a clerk to an iron foundry. He also took some interest in smithing. There, his employer's wife first took him to church, and he was immediately drawn to this by a sermon, and the pastor, Reverend Matthew Wilks, enrolled him in a class to prepare for pastoral ministry. However, his heart quickly became set on missionary work.

In September 1816, the London Missionary Society (LMS) commissioned him as a missionary in a service held at Surrey Chapel, London.

== South Pacific missionary ==
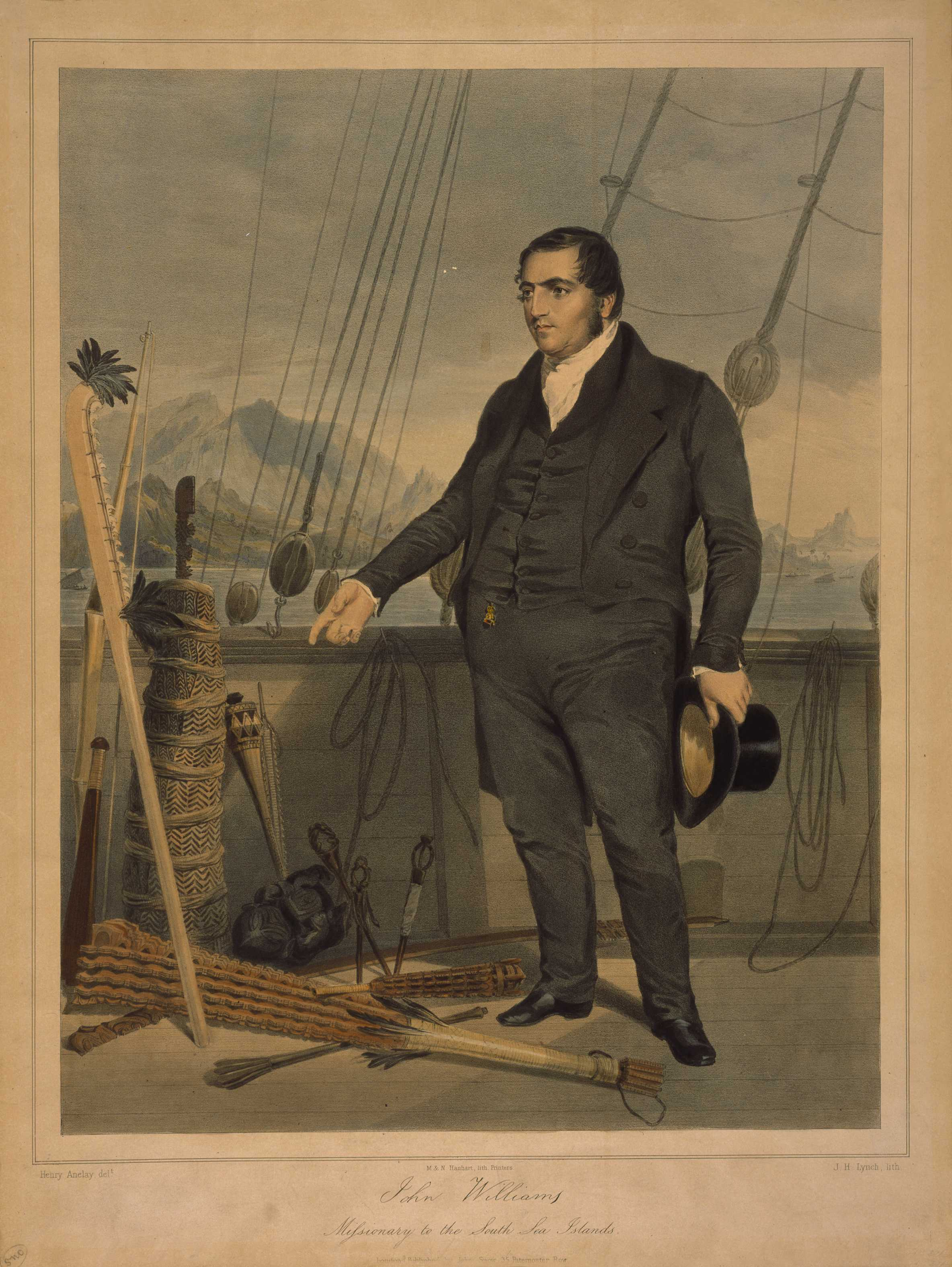
John Williams

On 17 November 1816, John Williams and his wife, Mary Chawner Williams, set sail from London to voyage to the Society Islands, a group of islands that included Tahiti, accompanied by William Ellis and his wife. Travelling via Sydney in Australia they initially only reached as far as Eimeo, west of Tahiti. He then spent at least 6 months there helping to build a boat before eventually reaching Tahiti in the autumn of 1817.

John and Mary established their first missionary post on the island of Raiatea. From there, they visited a number of the Polynesian island chains, sometimes with Mr. and Mrs. Ellis and other London Missionary Society representatives. Landing on Aitutaki in 1821, they used Tahitian converts to carry their message to the Cook islanders. The Williamses became the first missionary family to visit Samoa. They had ten children, but only three survived to adulthood.

In 1827 Williams had heard of other heathen islands in the vicinity and in order to expand his ministry he built a ship from local materials, Messenger of Peace, in fifteen weeks. He set sail by November 1827 for the Society Islands, not returning till February 1828, when he then removed his family to Raiatea.

John Williams arrived in Samoa in 1830. Among his crew were a Samoan couple, Fauea and his wife Puaseisei, who joined them on their voyage and proved pivotal in the mission in Samoa. They set foot on the island of Savaii at Puaseisei's village of Safune, before arriving at Sapapalii on the 24th of August, 1830, to meet with Malietoa Vaiinuupo who had sole power over Samoa following the death of his rival Tamafaiga. Williams' meeting with Malietoa proved a success, as Malietoa accepted Christianity immediately.

The Williamses returned in 1834 to Britain, where John supervised the printing of his translation of the New Testament into the Rarotongan language. They brought back a native of Samoa named Leota, who came to live as a Christian in London. At the end of his days, Leota was buried in Abney Park Cemetery with a dignified headstone paid for by the London Missionary Society, recording his adventure from the South Seas island of his birth. Whilst back in London, John Williams published a "Narrative of Missionary Enterprises in the South Sea Islands", making a contribution to English understanding and popularity of the region, before returning to the Polynesian islands in 1837 on the ship Camden under the command of Captain Robert Clark Morgan.

== Death ==
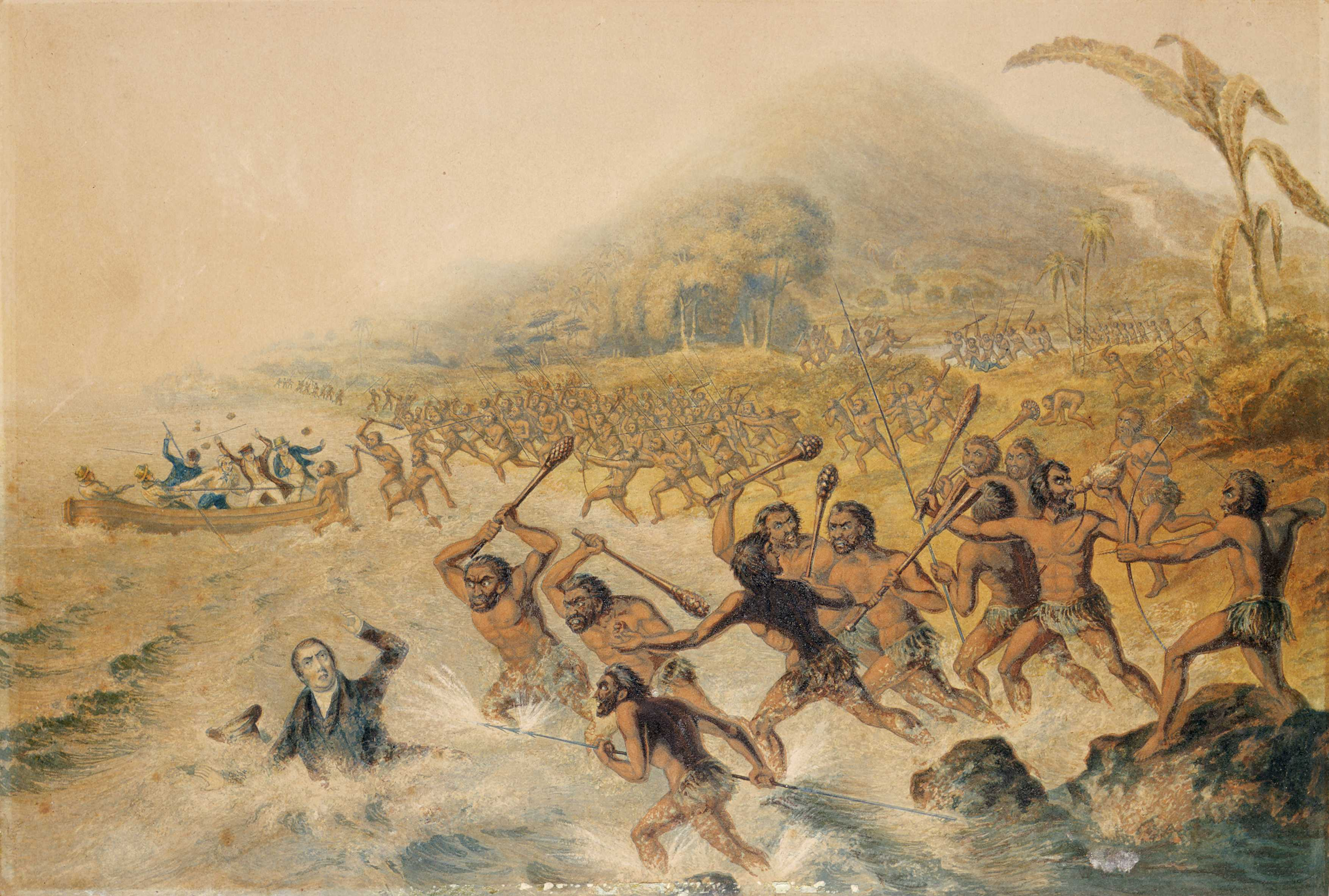
Massacre of John Williams and James Harris, 1839

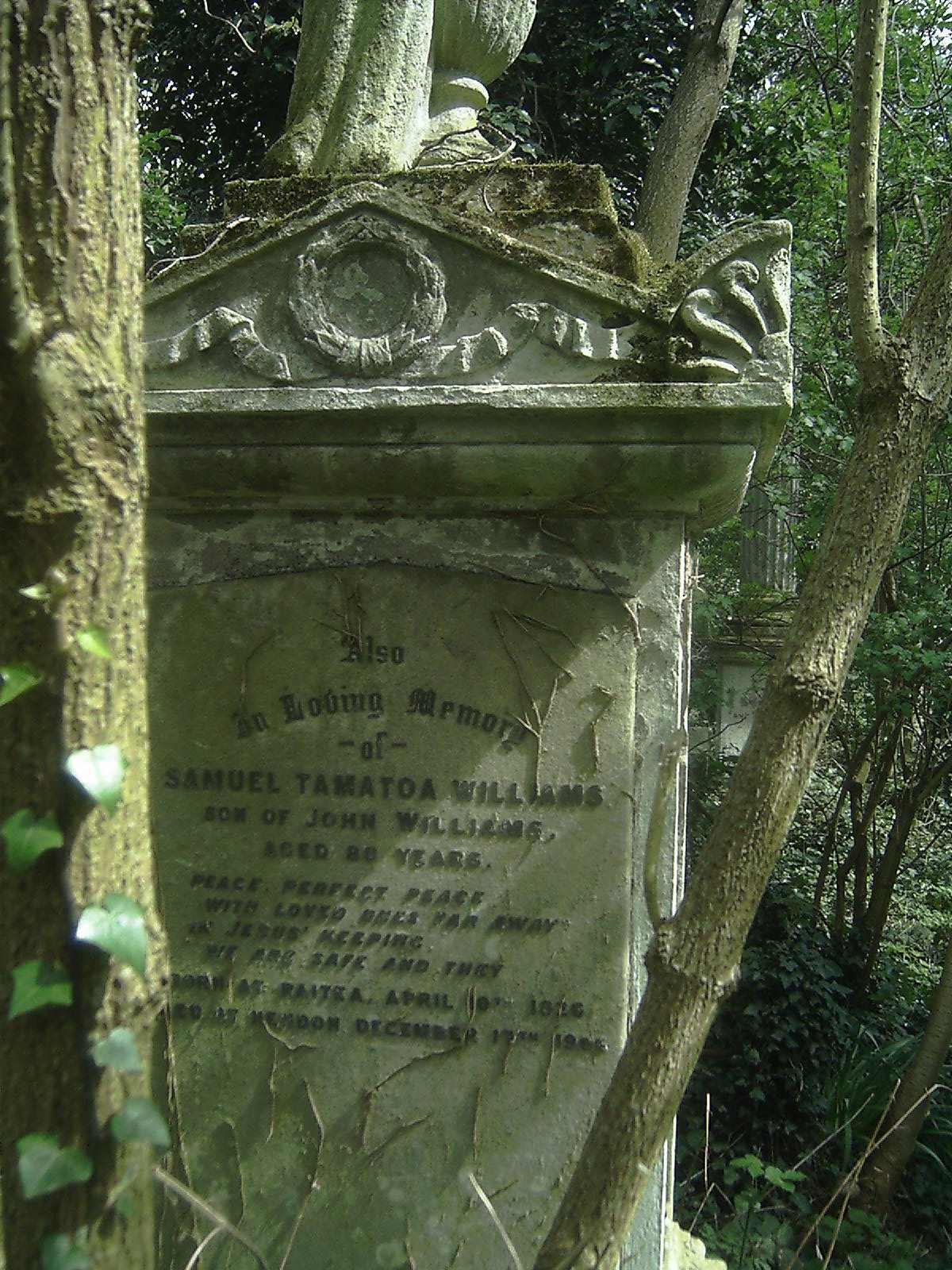
Memorial to John Williams's wife and son, at the Congregationalists' pioneering nondenominational place of rest, Abney Park Cemetery (April 2006)

Most of the Williamses' missionary work, and his delivery of a cultural message, were very successful and he became famed in Congregational circles. However, in November 1839, while visiting a part of the New Hebrides where John Williams was unknown, he and fellow missionary James Harris were killed and eaten by cannibals on the island of Erromango during an attempt to bring them the Gospel.

A memorial stone was erected on the island of Rarotonga in 1839 and is still there. Mrs. Williams died in June 1852. She is buried with their son Rev Samuel Tamatoa Williams, who was born in the New Hebrides, at the old Cedar Circle in London's Abney Park Cemetery; the name of her husband and the record of his death were placed on the most prominent side of the stone monument. John Williams' remains (bones) were shipped and are buried in Apia, Samoa. A monument was erected in front of the LMS church of Apia, and the six-storey headquarters of the Congregational Church of Samoa is named after John Williams, commemorating his work in the Samoan islands.

== Legacy ==
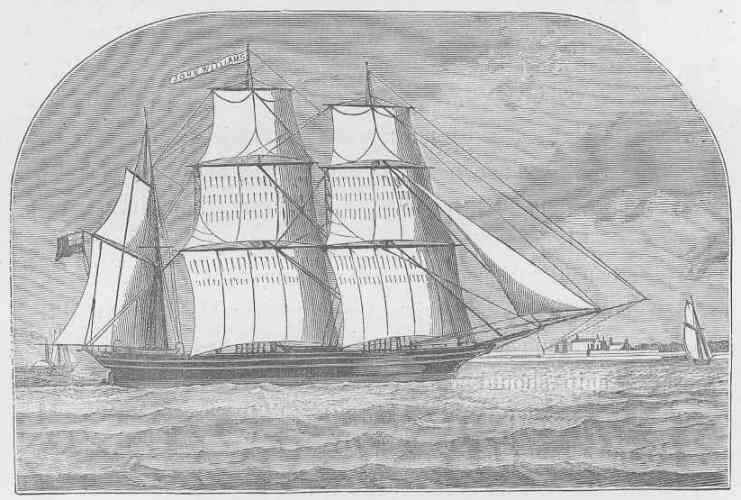
The John Williams II, built 1865

The LMS successively operated seven missionary ships in the Pacific which were named after John Williams. They were funded by donations from children. The first, John Williams, was launched in 1844, and the last, John Williams VII, was decommissioned in 1968.

In December 2009 descendants of John and Mary Williams travelled to Erromango to accept the apologies of descendants of the cannibals in a ceremony of reconciliation. To mark the occasion, Dillons Bay was renamed Williams Bay.

== See also ==
- Cannibalism in Oceania
- John Gibson Paton — another 19th-century missionary in the New Hebrides
- List of incidents of cannibalism
