= John Williams (gastroenterologist) =

John Gordon Williams CBE is a British health services researcher and clinical academic gastroenterologist. He led the establishment of the Postgraduate Medical School in Swansea, created and developed the Health Informatics Unit at the Royal College of Physicians, and was the founding president of WAGE, the Welsh Association for Gastroenterology and Endoscopy Williams was appointed a CBE for services to medicine in 2014.

== Naval career ==
He trained in medicine at Cambridge University and St Thomas' Hospital in London, qualifying in 1970. His early career was spent in the Royal Navy, where he trained as a gastroenterologist in naval hospitals in Plymouth and Portsmouth, and in London. With Sir Godfrey Milton-Thompson, Roy Pounder and George Misiewicz he evaluated the first H2-receptor antagonists to be given to man, refining new techniques to assess acid secretion, and demonstrating efficacy in duodenal ulcer disease, a common cause of significant morbidity in sailors. In 1982, he led a Surgical Support Team in the campaign to retake the Falklands Islands, overseeing the conversion of SS Canberra to take casualties, and driving the development and implementation of a simple resuscitation regime for mass casualties that was used successfully ashore. As Professor of Naval Medicine from 1984 to 1988 he oversaw the postgraduate training of naval physicians and research in the medical specialties.

== Swansea University ==
He retired from the Royal Navy in 1988 and was appointed to Swansea University, as the founding director of the School of Postgraduate Studies in Medical and Healthcare, the precursor of Swansea University Medical School. He pioneered the development of health services and informatics research, leading to the recognition of Swansea as a founding Centre of Excellence in the Farr Institute. From 2002 to 2007 he was Director of the Wales Office of Research and Development, a post in which he created the Clinical Research Collaboration Cymru. As a clinical and health services researcher he has led major trials of treatment and service delivery, and developed patient focused approaches to the measurement of quality of life and outcome, and the use of routine data for research. These studies have informed developments in service delivery in gastroenterology and in 2009 he was invited to deliver the Endoscopy Foundation Lecture at the Annual Meeting of the British Society of Gastroenterology. As Director of the Health Informatics Unit at the Royal College of Physicians he has led the development of national standards for the structure and content of patient records and communications, to improve the quality of record keeping and data returns. These standards are now embodied in national policy, and will be fundamental to the success a paperless NHS, and the introduction of precision medicine, by ensuring that sufficiently detailed data can be recorded in structured form in patient records.

== Distinctions ==
Commander of the Order of the British Empire (CBE) – for services to Medicine (2014)
