= John Williams (ship) =

Ship owned by the London Missionary Society 1844–1864

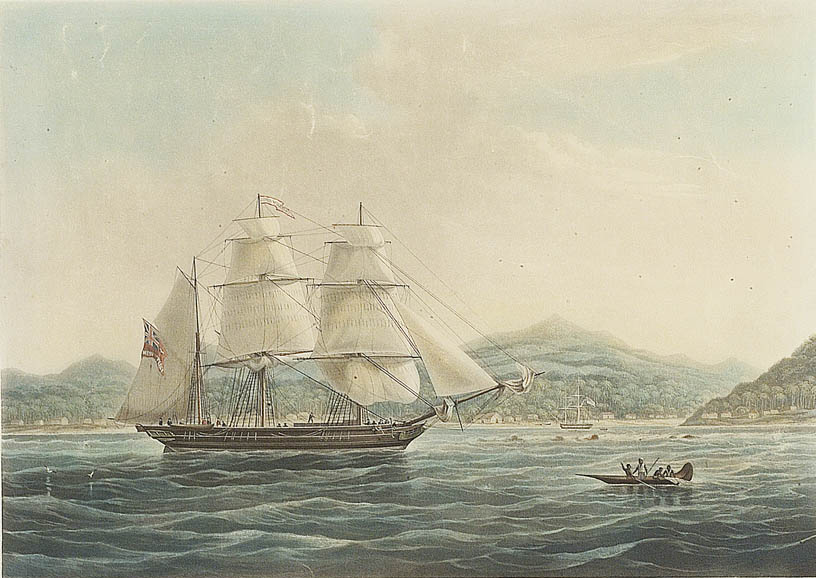
- John Williams in 1845

History
- Namesake: The missionary John Williams
- Owner: London Missionary Society
- Cost: 6200 pounds
- Launched: Harwich, 20 March 1844
- Fate: Wrecked, 16 May 1864, Pukapuka, Cook Islands
- Notes: 10 state rooms

General characteristics
- Tonnage: 296 tons
- Length: 103 ft (31 m)
- Beam: 24 ft 8 in (7.52 m)
- Depth of hold: 16 ft (4.9 m)
- Propulsion: Sails
- Complement: 27

John Williams was a missionary ship under the command of Captain Robert Clark Morgan (1798–1864) and owned by the London Missionary Society (LMS). She was named after John Williams (1796–1839), a missionary who had been active in the South Pacific.

She was paid for by the contribution of English school children.

She sank in 50 fathoms after drifting onto a reef at Danger Island (Pukapuka) on 16 May 1864. The passengers and crew were rescued.

Six more John Williams ships successively operated in the Pacific as part of the LMS's missionary work, the last, John Williams VII, being built in 1962 and decommissioned in 1968.

== General specifications ==
John Williams was launched at Harwich on 20 March 1844.

She was of 296 tons and had a length of 103 feet (31 meters) and beam of 24 feet 8 inches (7.52 meters). The depth of her hold was 16 feet (4.9 meters). She had 10 state rooms.

A medal was issued commemorating her first three-year voyage and an example of this is held at the Royal Museum of Greenwich.
