= John Owen Williams =

John Owen Williams may refer to:

- John Owen Williams (Pedrog) (1853–1932), Welsh Congregational minister and poet
- John Owen Williams (record producer) (born 1951), English A&R executive and record producer
