= John Williams (Medal of Honor, 1861) =

- Born: c. 1831; Elizabethtown, New Jersey, U.S.
- Died: October 30, 1899 (aged 67–68) Brooklyn, New York, U.S.
- Buried: Holy Cross Cemetery, Brooklyn, New York, U.S.
- Allegiance: United States
- Branch: Navy
- Conflicts: American Civil War
- Awards: Medal of Honor

John Williams (c. 1831 – October 30, 1899) was an American sailor who was awarded the Medal of Honor for his actions during the American Civil War.

== Biography ==
Williams was born in about 1831 in Elizabethtown, New Jersey. He served as a Boatswain's Mate aboard the USS Mohican. He earned his medal in action on November 7, 1861, at Hilton Head, South Carolina. He died in Brooklyn, New York on October 30, 1899, and is now buried in the Holy Cross Cemetery.

== Medal of Honor citation ==
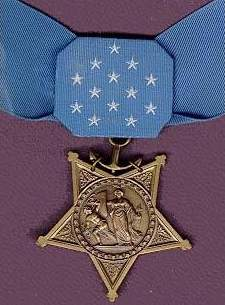

Medal of Honor citation reads:

For extraordinary heroism in action, serving as Captain of an 11-inch gun aboard the USS Mohican during action of the main squadron of ships against the heavily defended Forts Beauregard and Walker on Hilton Head, South Carolina, and against ships of the Confederate Fleet, 7 November 1861. Cool and courageous at his battle station, Boatswain's Mate Williams maintained steady fire against the enemy while under the fort batteries during a four-hour engagement which resulted in silencing the batteries of the forts and in the rout of the rebel steamers.
