= John Williams (footballer, born 1901) =

English footballer

Personal information
- Date of birth: 1901
- Place of birth: Pendleton, England
- Date of death: March 1965 (aged 63–64)
- Height: 5 ft 5 in (1.65 m)
- Position: Centre forward

Senior career*
Years	Team	Apps	(Gls)
- Bacup Borough
1923–1924	Rossendale United	27	(12)
1924–1925	Burnley	4	(2)
1927–1930	Rossendale United	82	(108)
- * Club domestic league appearances and goals

John Williams (born 1901, date of death unknown) was an English professional footballer who played as a centre forward.
