= John Willis Williams =

American politician

John Willis Williams was a state legislator in Arkansas. He served in the Arkansas House of Representatives in 1873 and then in the Arkansas Senate the following two years. He represented Phillips County.

== See also ==
- African American officeholders from the end of the Civil War until before 1900
