= John Williams (Caswell County, North Carolina) =

American politician

John Williams (July 7, 1740 – December 1, 1804) was an American leader from Caswell County, North Carolina during the American Revolution. Born in Hanover County, Virginia, he served in the North Carolina House of Commons (1778–1780) and state Senate (1782, 1793–1794).
