= John Williams (rugby league, born 1907) =

Wales international rugby league footballer

Personal information
- Full name: John Williams
- Born: 1907 Rhos, Cilybebyll, Wales

Playing information
- Position: Wing
Club
Years	Team	Pld	T	G	FG	P
≤1935–≥35	Rochdale Hornets
Representative
Years	Team	Pld	T	G	FG	P
1935	Wales	1	0	0	0	0

John Williams (1907 – after 1964) was a Welsh professional rugby league footballer who played in the 1930s. He played at representative level for Wales, and club level for Rochdale Hornets, as a wing.

== Background ==
Jack Williams was born in Rhos, Cilybebyll, Wales, and he died in 1964.

== International honours ==
Williams won a cap for Wales while at Rochdale Hornets in the 11–18 defeat by France at Stade Chaban-Delmas, Bordeaux, on 1 January 1935.
