= John Williams (minister and physician) =

Welsh nonconformist preacher and doctor (1626 or 1627–1673)

John Williams (1626 or 1627 – 28 March 1673) was a Welsh nonconformist preacher and doctor. He was said to be the first to introduce non-conformism to his home county of Caernarfonshire, and it was also said that he could be heard when he was preaching for a distance of a quarter of a mile.

== Life ==
Williams was born on the Llŷn peninsula, in the parish of Llanbedrog, Caernarfonshire, north-west Wales. His father (a member of the minor gentry) was William Jones, with Williams obtaining a patronymic surname according to Welsh practice at that time. At the age of 20, in 1647, he matriculated at Jesus College, Oxford, and studied medicine. Thereafter, his movements until 1662 are uncertain: whilst it is known that he was a Puritan and took up preaching, the possibility that he was the "John Williams," who was the vicar of Llanbeblig from 1651 cannot be verified on the surviving information. Historians, however, differ on whether Williams was a chaplain in the army during some of this period.

Williams figured in a history of the Methodist revival in Wales, published in 1820 and based upon oral testimony. He was said to be the first preacher to introduce non-conformity to Caernarfonshire, and it was also said that he could be heard preaching for a distance of a quarter of a mile. In 1662, he was arrested for his preaching in Caernarfonshire, leaving for London after his release, where he became the chaplain of a Puritan noble in Kent. In the following year, he was accused of writing a treasonable letter (which spoke of the sufferings of the non-conformists and hoped that God would arm those fearing him, which was perhaps intended metaphorically rather than literally) and a warrant was issued in Caernarfonshire for his arrest. He gave himself up to the authorities in London, and was acquitted after spending 10 weeks in prison. He then returned to Caernarfonshire and worked as a physician, with his house being registered as a non-conformist meeting-house in 1672. Henry Maurice rebuked him twice in 1672 for not preaching enough and "neglecting the work of the Lord", but Williams defended himself. He died on 28 March 1673, and was buried in Llangian, with his tombstone referring in its Latin epigraph to his dual role as minister and doctor.
