= John Williams (mixed martial artist) =

Canadian mixed martial artist (1940–2015)

- Born: March 7, 1940; Moncton, New Brunswick, Canada
- Died: March 28, 2015 (aged 75); Tagbilaran, Bohol, Philippines
- Other names: Gray Wolf, Dr. John Williams
- Nationality: (Canada)
- Height: 1.88 m (6 ft 2 in)
- Division: Heavyweight
- Style: Judo, Mixed Martial Arts
- Fighting out of: Canada
- Team: Team Williams
- Rank: black belt in Judo
- Years active: 2010

Kickboxing record
- Total: 1
- Wins: 1
- Losses: 0

Other information
- Occupation: Doctor, Professional Mixed Martial Arts Fighter

John Williams (March 7, 1940 – March 28, 2015) was a Canadian mixed martial artist who became the oldest active professional mixed martial artist at age 70, when he made his professional fight debut against Larry Brubaker on 24 July 2010.

== Early life ==
Williams belonged to the Native American tribe Wabenaki and was a direct ancestor of the great Wabenaki war chief Madockaweando. Both of John's parents spoke French and were part of the Wabenaki tribe. Dr. John Williams has always been an avid mixed martial artist (MMA) fighter, and started fighting at the juvenile age of 7. Williams picked up fast on mixed martial arts (MMA), and by age 16 he had already received training in Olympic-style weightlifting, Kodokan Judo, and Tani-Ha Jiu-Jitsu. By the time John reached the age of 23, he had started giving demonstrations that authenticated pure forms of strength and ability. Some of the tasks he performed included, bending spikes, tearing phonebooks and license plates in half, and holding two jeeps from going in the opposite directions.

== Martial arts/MMA career ==
Williams became so influential through the sport of mixed martial arts (MMA), that he eventually opened up a Jiu-Jitsu practice in the United States in 1963. Although having his own practice which kept him busy in the sport, Williams went on to teach a variety of seminars all over the world. Williams brought the sport of MMA to Canada and also was one of the first record holders of several different events. Williams was part of a very successful Canadian wrestling team which happened to be one of the top three in Canada at the time. He won Mr. Moncton title in the late 1950s and entered the Guinness Book of World Records in the 1980s. In 1987, Williams set a world record for breaking multiple blocks of ice with a single punch. Each block was 11 inches thick, 22 inches wide, and 42 inches long, and were stacked one on top of the other 10 consecutive blocks in a pile. This record still stands today. Some other records in the name of John Williams include 13 consecutive hours of judo throws and over 100 weightlifting records, which include a world record for lifting 505 pounds in the one-handed deadlift at 160 pound bodyweight. Sadly, this record was disproved as the world record for this lift was already achieved in 1920. He fought in kickboxing, amateur and professional boxing, and he competed in both karate and judo.

At 70 years old, Williams decided to set a new record. He wanted to become the oldest professional debuting mixed martial arts fighter in history. However, athletic commissions were opposed to this idea. Williams had to pass a volume of both physical and medical tests to prove it was safe for him to compete in professional mixed martial arts. Williams passed all the tests.

Prior to competing against former professional wrestler Larry Brewbaker, Williams wanted to prove a serious point on his insight concerning professional fighting and the association it has with age. Williams emphasized the fact that, "as a person becomes a senior, society kind of pushes them out of the loop. The attitude around them is that they're dumb, they can't do anything, physically they're just vegetables, and there sort of shunned by society." Williams wanted to prove that he was not just another senior citizen in society, but that he was capable of achieving victory in a professional fight; which many people thought was impossible at his age.

In an interview prior to his match, Williams said, "I went and got information on discrimination towards a person because of age, and I realized that if I say this is my job and I’m physically capable of doing the job, there was no way in the world they could stop me. This had nothing to do with risk factors. When you know what you’re doing, MMA is safe. I could have done an amateur thing or an exhibition, but no, I wanted to do a real fight."

== Record breaking MMA debut match ==
Williams, sporting a long pony-tail, met Larry Brewbaker, 49, a used car salesman with a shaved head and multiple tattoos. Their fight took place in Moncton, New Brunswick, Canada, on 24 July 2010, at the "Elite 1 – Wild Card".

The 70-year-old Williams set three records that night. He became the oldest debuting MMA fighter, the oldest active MMA fighter, and the oldest winning MMA fighter. Williams won his match by ankle lock in the second round.

In an interview after his record-making victory, Williams said, "The point of life is living it. And I tell you, I got in that cage and I felt alive. I felt human again. You get that thing over your head, people think you’re 70 and you don’t know [expletive]. They don’t bother to get to know you. I like Eminem. I like rap music. …Mentally, I feel the same as I did when I was 30. I like the same kind of cars, make the same kind of ridiculous claims, and the enjoy same kinds of women. Nothing’s changed for me, but there’s this stereotype. You don’t change, but they try and make you fit a mold and be something you don’t want to be, which is an old person. Not me. I’ve been a fighter all my life."
