= John Williams (Jamaican politician) =

Politician in Jamaica

John Williams (died 1829) was a planter and slave-owner in Jamaica. He owned the Cool Spring Plantation in Clarendon Parish and had an interest in Provost's Rock River plantation. He had family connections to the Isle of Wight in England. He was elected to the House of Assembly of Jamaica in 1820 for the parish of Clarendon.
