= Johnnie Williams (baseball) =

Hawaiian baseball player (1889–1963)

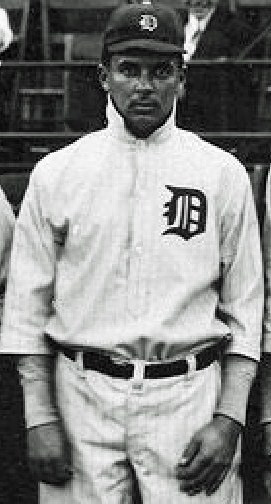
- Pitcher
- Born: July 16, 1889; Honolulu, Kingdom of Hawaii
- Died: September 8, 1963 (aged 74); Long Beach, California, U.S.
- Batted: Right Threw: Right

MLB debut
- April 21, 1914, for the Detroit Tigers

Last MLB appearance
- August 19, 1914, for the Detroit Tigers

MLB statistics
- Win–loss record: 0-2
- Strikeouts: 4
- Earned run average: 6.35
- Stats at Baseball Reference

Teams
- Detroit Tigers (1914)

John Brodie Williams (July 16, 1889 – September 8, 1963) was a Major League Baseball pitcher. He pitched in four games for the Detroit Tigers in 1914, including three starts. He pitched 11 1/3 innings, giving up 17 hits and 12 runs. Williams, known as "Honolulu Johnny", was the first player of Hawaiian ancestry to play in the major leagues.

== Sources ==
- Career statistics from Baseball Reference · Baseball Reference (Minors) · Retrosheet · Baseball Almanac
