= John Williams (cricketer, born 1980) =

English cricketer (born 1980)

Personal information
- Full name: John Charles Williams
- Born: 8 November 1980 (age 46); Weston-super-Mare, Somerset, England
- Batting: Right-handed
- Bowling: Right-arm medium

Domestic team information
- Years: Team
- 2000: Somerset Cricket Board

Career statistics
Competition	LA
Matches	1
Runs scored	10
Batting average	10.00
100s/50s	–/–
Top score	10
Balls bowled	–
Wickets	–
Bowling average	–
5 wickets in innings	–
10 wickets in match	–
Best bowling	–
Catches/stumpings	–/–
- Source: Cricinfo, 20 October 2010

John Charles Williams (born 8 November 1980) is a former English cricketer. Williams was a right-handed batsman who bowled right-arm medium pace. He was born at Weston-super-Mare, Somerset.

Williams represented the Somerset Cricket Board in a single List A match against Staffordshire in the 1st round of the 2000 NatWest Trophy at the Gorway Ground, Walsall. In his only List A match, he scored 10 runs.
