= John G. Williams Jr. =

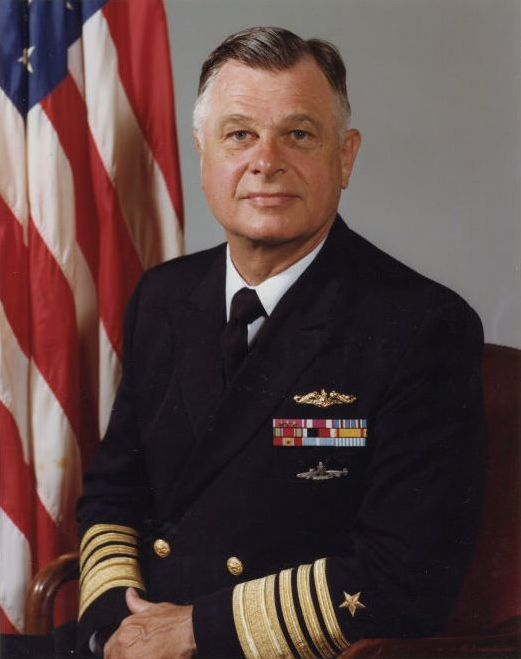
- Born: July 24, 1924; Portland, Oregon, US
- Died: October 4, 1991 (aged 67); Fort Lewis, Washington, US
- Military career
- Branch: United States Navy
- Service years: 1946–1983
- Rank: Admiral

Admiral John Grouille Williams Jr. (July 24, 1924 – October 4, 1991) was a four-star admiral who served as Chief of Naval Material (CNM), 1981–1983.

Williams was born on July 24, 1924, in Portland, Oregon, the son of John G. and Julia (Hoare) Williams. He was raised in Ilwaco, Washington, where he graduated from Ilwaco High School.

Williams graduated from the United States Naval Academy in 1946 as a member of the class of 1947.

He served aboard the USS Pomodon (SS-486), USS Chivo (SS-341), and USS Stickleback (SS-415). He was commanding officer of USS Sterlet (SS-392), USS Haddo (SSN-604) and USS Daniel Webster (SSBN-626), and the Squadron at Rota, Spain.

He retired from the navy in 1983 and died on October 4, 1991, of lung cancer.
