= John Ellis Williams =

Welsh novelist and writer (1924–2008)

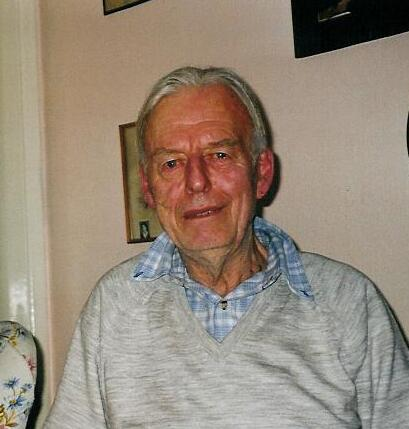
John Ellis Williams in 2005

John Ellis Williams (20 August 1924 – 7 December 2008), novelist and writer from Caernarfonshire, wrote in Welsh and in English.

== Life ==
Williams was born in Llanddeiniolen on 20 August 1924 into a farming family.

In World War II Williams served with the Royal Air Force. After the war, his interest in the Existentialist movement led him to correspond with Simone de Beauvoir and visit her in Paris.

Williams also wrote fiction and non-fiction for various journals. His autobiography, Clouds of Times and other stories, appeared in 1989. He acted as lead consultant for a film about his uncle, Ellis Williams, broadcast on S4C in 2006. Williams was elected an Ovate (green robe) of the National Eisteddfod of Wales in Cardiff on 8 August 2008 for his contribution to the field of literature in Wales.

== Selected publications ==
=== Novels ===
- Bryndu Mawr (Glasgoed Eisteddfod Chair, 1959; serialised in Herald Cymraeg, 1959)
- Hadau Gwyllt (Gwasg Gee, 1968)
- Modd i Fyw (Cyngor Llyfrau Cymru, 1968)
- Yr Ynys Wydr (Cyhoeddiadau Modern, 1969)
- Gwynt i Oen (Gwasg Gwynedd. 1970)
- Paul Jones a'r Tywysog (Gwasg Gee, 1975)
- Wrth Ddychwel (Cyhoeddiadau Mei, 1982)
- Nes Adref (Gwasg Carreg Gwalch, 1996)

=== Other fictional/semi-fictional works ===
- Straeon Cyfar Main (Cyhoeddiadau Mei, 1985) dramatised on BBC Radio Cymru
- Dychweliad y Deryn Mawr (Gwasg Carreg Gwalch, 1990)
- Rare Welsh Bits (Gwasg Carreg Gwalch, 2001)

=== Children's stories ===
- Elwd y Teiliwr Bach (Gwasg Gee, 1966)
- Owen the Goat of Snowdon (PeniPrint, 1981)
- Chwedlau Siôn ac Eleri (Gwasg Carreg Gwalch, 1992)

=== Biography/Autobiography ===
- Clouds of Time and Other Stories (Gwasg Carreg Gwalch, 1989; initially serialised in Welsh in Pais magazine and in English on BBC Radio 4, BBC Radio Wales and in The Countryman). "Clouds of Time" itself, first published in Welsh as "Cymylau Amser", is the life story of Williams's mother, Jane Rowland Jones, and how both she and her future husband sheltered a deserter from the trenches in World War I.
