= John Cornelius Williams Jr. =

American politician

Member of the South Carolina House of Representatives for Spartanburg County
- In office 1969–1974

Personal details
- Born: November 9, 1938 (age 87) Spartanburg, South Carolina
- Party: Democratic
- Occupation: lawyer

John Cornelius Williams Jr. (born November 9, 1938) was an American politician in the state of South Carolina. He served in the South Carolina House of Representatives as a member of the Democratic Party from 1969 to 1974, representing Spartanburg County, South Carolina. He is a lawyer.
