= John B. Williams (bassist) =

American bassist and guitarist (1941–2026)

- Born: February 27, 1941; New York City, U.S.
- Died: June 4, 2026 (aged 85)
- Occupation: Musician
- Instruments: Double bass, bass guitar
- Formerly of: The Tonight Show Band

John B. Williams Jr. (February 27, 1941 – June 4, 2026) was an American double-bassist and bass guitarist.

== Life and career ==
Williams was born in New York City on February 27, 1941. He studied percussion before switching to bass as a member of the United States Marine Corps. He studied under Ron Carter, then joined Horace Silver's group in 1967, remaining with him until 1969. He performed and recorded extensively in the late 1960s and early 1970s in jazz settings, including with Mose Allison, Roy Ayers, Count Basie, Kenny Burrell, Dizzy Gillespie, Bobby Hutcherson and Harold Land, Hugh Masekela, Zoot Sims, Clark Terry, Leon Thomas, and Kai Winding.

He joined the band of The Tonight Show in 1972. In the mid-1970s, he worked with Benny Carter and Billy Cobham, then worked with Michael Wolff in a trio setting (1978–1983). Other associations in the 1980s included Carl Burnett, Art Farmer and Benny Golson, Jon Hendricks, Paul Humphrey, Gerald Wilson and Nancy Wilson. He returned to play with Wolff in the house band for The Arsenio Hall Show (1989–1993), and continued working with Wolff into the late 1990s.

== Illness and death ==
Williams had been suffering from dementia when he entered hospice care in 2026 after undergoing brain surgery following a fall. He died on June 4, at the age of 85.

== Sources ==
- "John Williams (v)". The New Grove Dictionary of Jazz. 2nd edition, ed. Barry Kernfeld.
