= Johnny Williams (drummer) =

American percussionist (1905–1985)

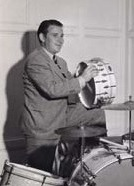
- Williams in 1938

Background information
- Born: John Francis Nagle; November 15, 1905; Rockland, Maine, U.S.
- Died: October 19, 1985 (aged 79) Los Angeles, California, U.S.
- Genre: Jazz
- Occupation: Musician
- Instruments: Drums; percussion
- Years active: 1930s–1970s
- Formerly of: Raymond Scott Quintette; Your Hit Parade Orchestra
- Spouse: Esther Towner (m. 1929)
- Children: 4, including John
- Relatives: Joseph Williams (grandson); Ethan Gruska and Bobby Gruska (great-grandchildren)

John Francis Williams (né Nagle; November 15, 1905 – October 19, 1985) was an American percussionist from the early 1930s to the late 1950s. In New York and Hollywood, he worked on radio, in films, and as a recording artist. He was the father of film composer and conductor John Williams.

== Personal life ==
John Francis Nagle was born in Rockland, Maine, on November 15, 1905, the son of Thomas Nagle and Katherine Duffy. His father was a drummer who owned a music store, and also organized an orchestra in Bath, Maine. His family moved to Bangor when he was three months old. He grew up there and graduated from Bangor High School in 1924. He took the surname of his stepfather, Henry Williams, a political consultant who worked on Republican Party campaigns and served on the Bangor city council.

Williams married Esther Towner, a dancer from Boston, in 1929. They had four children, including film composer John Williams. Williams is the grandfather of singer Joseph Williams.

Johnny Williams died in Hollywood on October 19, 1985, at the age of 79.

== Raymond Scott Quintette ==
Scott was a notorious perfectionist, demanding retake after retake in the rehearsal studio. About this process, Williams told historian Michèle Wood, "All he ever had was machines, only we had names." Williams, explaining Scott's (commercially successful) penchant for recording rehearsals and using the reference discs to develop and finalize his compositions, said, "He didn't write anything, but he edited everything. We would work these things up and we would never change them, ever. We had to do them note for note. It was highly unsatisfactory, and it sold like hell."

Scott painted "portraits in jazz", or "descriptive jazz"—what he felt were musical vignettes of colorful evocations, such as "Reckless Night on Board an Ocean Liner" and "Celebration on the Planet Mars". Williams considered it undignified, but admittedly lucrative. "We really didn't want to do any of it," he told Wood. "We thought [it] was descriptive, all right, but not jazz, because jazz is right now, not memorized note for note. And after all this compulsive rehearsal, suddenly it all caught on and we were making more money than anybody else in town, all thanks to him. We were doing records, public appearances, making movies, everything." Williams also acknowledged a performance dividend. "All that discipline helped ... It had to. I developed a technique way beyond what I'd had", he told Wood.

Scott and his band returned to New York in 1938, allegedly due to the leader's disgust at Hollywood culture ("They think everything is 'wonderful'", he told an interviewer). After dissolving his Quintette in 1939, Scott formed a swing-fashioned big band. Williams remained with the bandleader for at least one incarnation of Scott's newly constituted orchestra. (Scott re-formed the Raymond Scott Quintet [sic] in 1948, but Williams was not involved.)

== Professional history ==
Williams featured on the cover of Leedy Drum Topics promotional booklet, October 1939, with Raymond Scott, Kate Smith, Bill "Bojangles" Robinson, and others

Throughout his association with Scott, Williams continued as an in-demand drummer for the CBS radio network. His assignments included playing for bands led by Benny Goodman, Tommy Dorsey, Vincent Lopez, Leo Reisman, Jacques Renard, and Alfonso D'Artega. He drummed for singer Kate Smith's radio program and in Mark Warnow's orchestra on the long-running radio program Your Hit Parade in the 1930s and 1940s. (Note: Warnow was Scott's older brother.)

When Your Hit Parade moved to California in 1948, Williams relocated to the West Coast. In Hollywood, he found session work in films, performing for Columbia Pictures in soundtrack orchestras for such films as On the Waterfront, Picnic, and From Here to Eternity. In the 1953 film Let's Do It Again, he "ghost-drummed" for actor Ray Milland.
