= John Scott Williams =

Wing Commander John Scott Williams
- Born: John Scott Williams; 1893; Goldenville, Nova Scotia, Canada
- Died: 1 January 1944 (aged 51); Montreal, Quebec, Canada
- Spouse: Dorothy Natalie Williams
- Military career
- Service: Royal Canadian Air Force
- Wars: Second World War

Wing Commander John Scott Williams MC AFC (1893–1944) was a Canadian military officer and aviator. In 1921, he organized the Royal Canadian Air Force. Williams was born at Goldenville, Nova Scotia, in 1893. Williams died in a hospital in Montreal on 1 January 1944, age 51, after a lengthy illness.
