= John Sibley Williams =

American poet

John Sibley Williams (born December 7, 1978, in Melrose, Massachusetts) is an American poet, educator, and literary agent. He is the author of "As One Fire Consumes Another" (winner of the 2018 Orison Poetry Prize), "Skin Memory" (winner of the 2018 Backwaters Poetry Prize, "Disinheritance", and "Controlled Hallucinations", as well as six chapbooks. He has edited three regional poetry collections and works as editor of the poetry journal The Inflectionist Review.

== Life ==
Williams received a B.A. from the University at Albany, SUNY in 2003 and an M.A. in creative writing in 2005 from Rivier University. After traveling abroad for three years, he moved to Portland, Oregon in 2009 and earned his M.A. in Book Publishing from Portland State University. There he worked as Acquisitions Manager of Ooligan Press at Portland State University and was instrumental in the production of the Alive at the Center, the Pacific Poetry Project's first volume poetry anthology.

In 2012, Williams and fellow poets A. Molotkov and David Cooke became co-directors of the Walt Whitman 150 organization, a biannual celebration of Whitman's legacy. The following year, he and Molotkov started The Inflectionist Review, an international poetry and art magazine.

His work has appeared over 500 journals, including The Yale Review, Southern Review, Colorado Review, Prairie Schooner, The Massachusetts Review, Midwest Quarterly, Poetry Northwest, Atlanta Review, Third Coast, RHINO, and various anthologies.

Williams lives in Milwaukie, Oregon with his wife, twin toddlers, Boston terrier, and three cats.

== Works ==
=== Full-length collections ===
- As One Fire Consumes Another], Orison Books, 2019
- Skin Memory], Backwaters Press, 2019
- Disinheritance], Apprentice House 2016.
- Controlled Hallucinations], FutureCycle Press, 2013

=== Chapbooks ===
- Motionless from the Iron Bridge: A Northwest Anthology of Bridge Poems], Barebone Books, 2013 (editor)
- The End of Mythology, Virgogray Press, 2013
- The Longest Compass, Finishing Line Press, 2012
- Folded Word Press, 2012
- Autobiography of Fever, Bedouin Books, 2011
- The Art of Raining, The Knives Forks and Spoons Press, 2011
- Door, Door, Red Ochre Press, 2011
- A Pure River, The Last Automat Press, 2010

== Awards ==
A nineteen-time Pushcart nominee, Williamsis the winner of numerous awards, including the Philip Booth Award, American Literary Review Poetry Contest, Phyllis Smart-Young Prize, The 46er Prize, Nancy D. Hargrove Editors' Prize, Confrontation Poetry Prize, and Laux/Millar Prize.

== Reviews ==
- "Controlled Hallucinations by John Sibley Williams". The Driftless Area Review. July 9, 2013.
- Molotkov, A. (2013). "Review: Controlled Hallucinations". Elohi Gadugi Journal. Summer.
