= John B. Williams (general) =

U.S. Air Force general

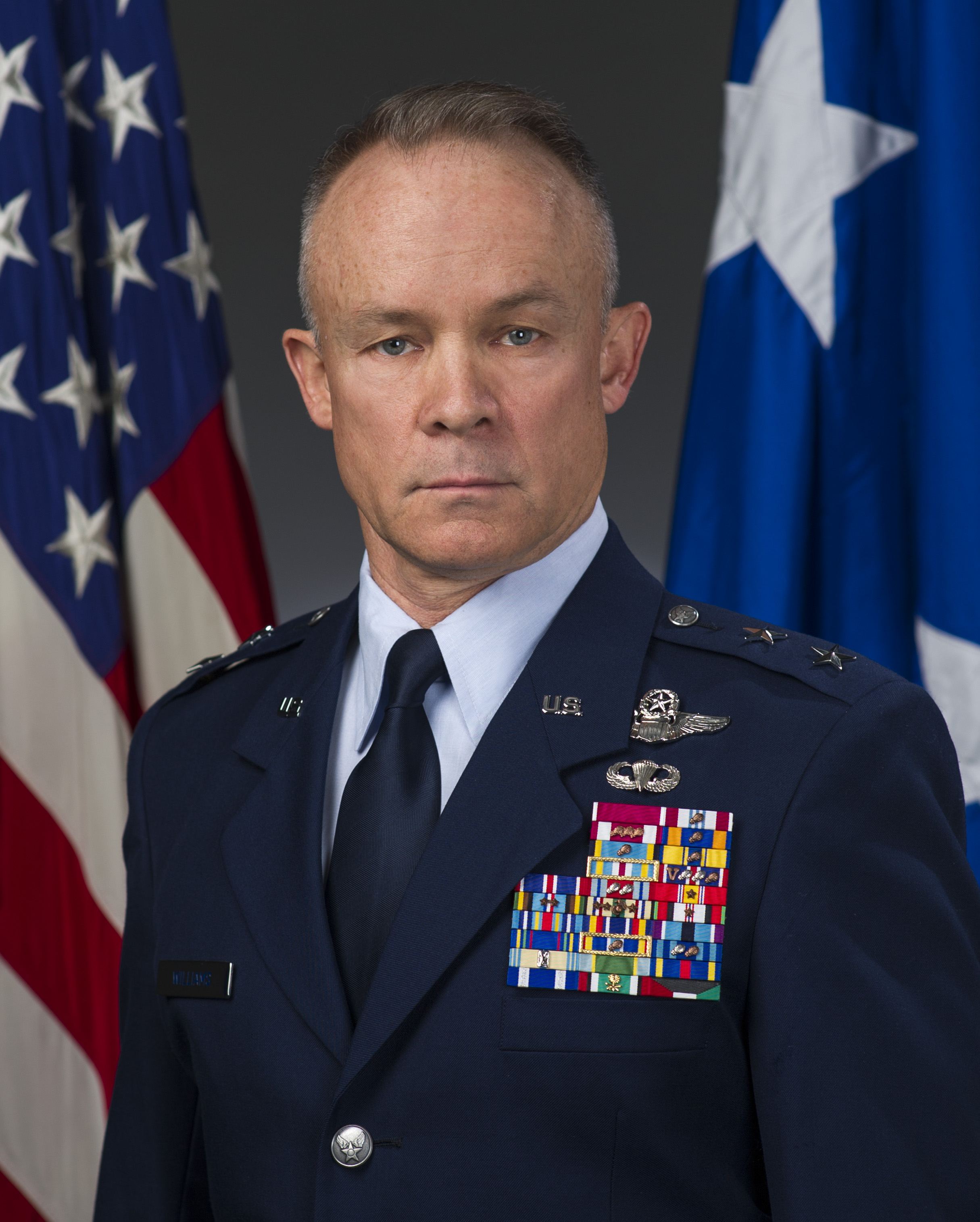
- Official portrait, 2018
- Military career
- Allegiance: United States
- Branch: United States Air Force
- Service years: 1985–present
- Rank: Major General
- Commands: 79th Aerial Refueling Squadron
- Awards: Legion of Merit

John B. Williams is a United States Air Force major general who most recently served as the Mobilization Assistant to the Commander of the Air Mobility Command from July 2020 to July 2021. Previously, he was the Mobilization Assistant to the Commander of the Pacific Air Forces.

Military offices
Preceded by Thomas E. Kittler	Mobilization Assistant to the Commander of the Eighteenth Air Force; 2015–2018	Succeeded by Boyd Parker
Preceded by ???	Mobilization Assistant to the Commander of the United States Air Forces in Europe – Air Forces Africa; 2018–2019	Succeeded by ???
Preceded by Walter J. Sams	Mobilization Assistant to the Commander of the Pacific Air Forces; 2019–2020	Succeeded by Tyler Otten
Preceded by Craig L. La Fave	Mobilization Assistant to the Commander of the Air Mobility Command; 2020–2021	Succeeded by Kenneth R. Council Jr.
