= John Williams (archdeacon of Worcester) =

British Anglican priest

John Charles Williams (17 July 1912 – 27 August 2002) was an Anglican priest.

Williams was educated at Cowbridge Grammar School and University College, Oxford; and ordained in 1938. His first ecclesiastical post was a curacy at Christ Church, Birmingham. After this he was curate in charge of St Margaret's Hasbury then vicar of Cradley Heath from 1943 to 1948. He was vicar of St Stephen's Redditch from 1948 to 1959; Rural Dean of Bromsgrove from 1958 to 1959; rector of Halesowen from 1959 to 1970; Archdeacon of Dudley from 1968 to 1975; vicar of Dodderhill from 1970 to 1975; Archdeacon of Worcester from 1975 until 1980; Director of Ordination Candidates for the Diocese of Worcester from 1975 to 1979; and a residentiary canon of Worcester Cathedral from 1975 to 1980.

Church of England titles
Preceded by Alfred Hurley	Archdeacon of Dudley; 1968–1975	Succeeded by Christopher Campling
Preceded by Peter Eliot	Archdeacon of Worcester; 1975–1980	Succeeded by Peter Coleman
