= John Elias Williams =

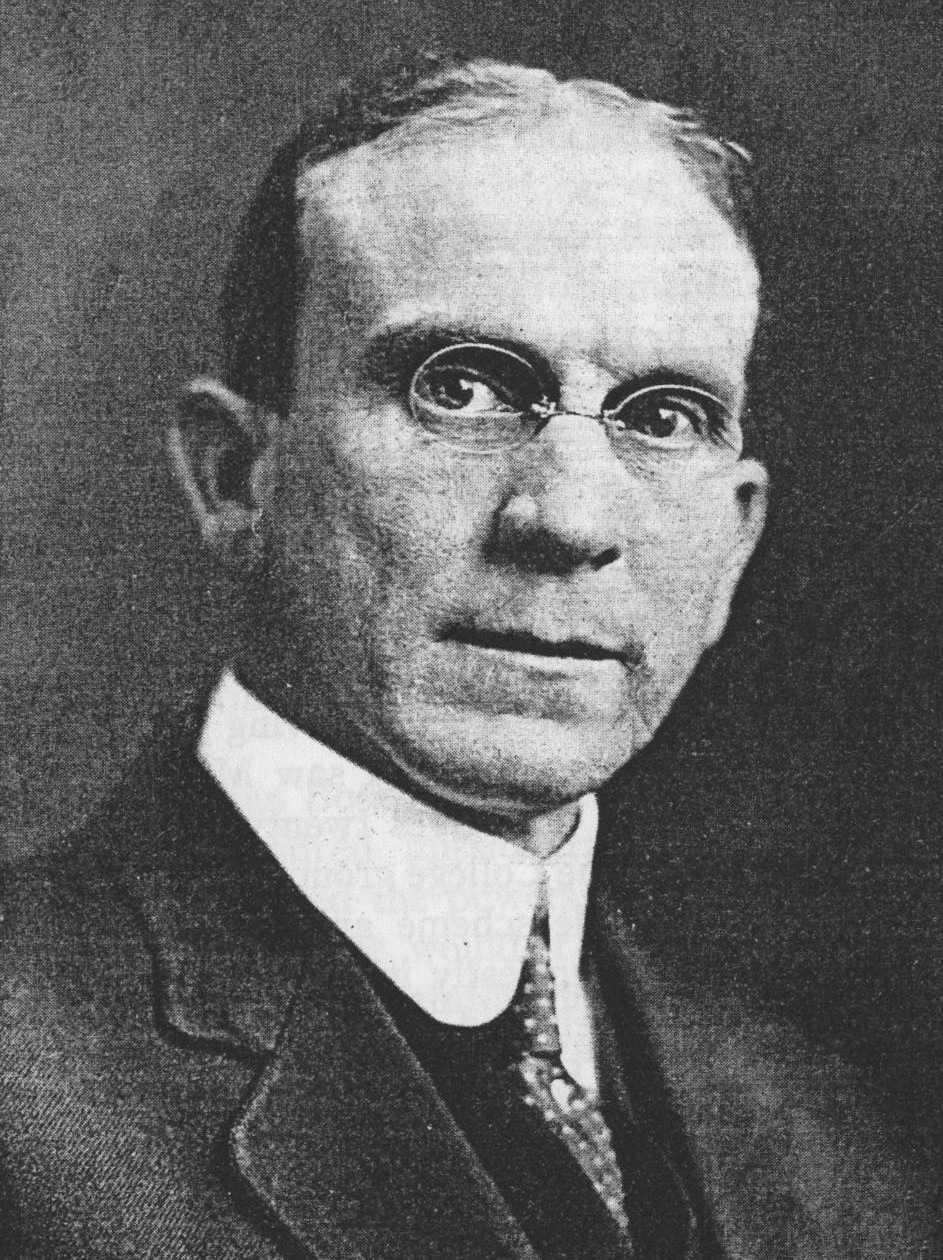
John Elias Williams

John Elias Williams (Chinese: 文怀恩; pinyin: Wén huái ēn; 1871 – 24 March 1927) was a missionary to China, he served with the American Presbyterian Mission for 28 years. He was also the vice president of the University of Nanking. He was murdered in the Nanking Incident on 24 March 1927.

Williams was born and raised in Ohio. He was a coal miner in his teenage years. He graduated from Marietta College, Ohio, and Auburn Seminary, New York. He applied to the Presbyterian Board of Missions and was assigned to China. He married Cora Lilian Caldwell, daughter of missionaries in August 1899, and sailed with her to China that same month. They raised four children.

Williams served several years as principal of the Presbyterian Academy in Nanking, a boys' school. He later taught for a year at Waseda University, Tokyo. He returned in 1907 to Nanking, where he helped open Union College, formed by the union of several mission schools. Williams served as acting dean of the college of arts and science and as vice president.

Williams was shot and killed by a Chinese soldier on the campus of the university, during an outbreak of violence against foreigners, now known as the Nanking Incident.
