= John T. Williams (politician) =

American politician

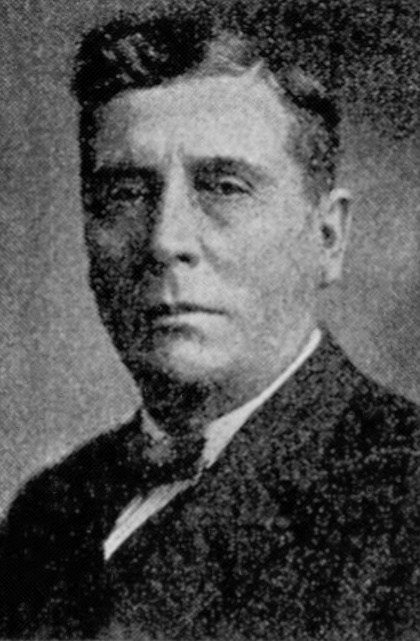

Member of the Wisconsin State Assembly
- In office 1917, 1919

Personal details
- Born: September 6, 1864 Columbia County, Wisconsin, US
- Died: February 15, 1944 (aged 79) Sun Prairie, Wisconsin, US
- Party: Republican
- Occupation: Farmer, politician

John T. Williams (September 6, 1864 – February 15, 1944) was an American politician. He was a member of the Wisconsin State Assembly.

== Biography ==
Williams was born on September 6, 1864, in Columbia County, Wisconsin. He became a farmer. Williams died at a nursing home in Sun Prairie, Wisconsin in 1944 and was buried in Dodgeville, Wisconsin.

== Electoral career ==
Williams was elected to the Assembly in 1916 and 1918. Previously, he was elected sheriff of Iowa County, Wisconsin in 1912. He had been appointed undersheriff the year before. Williams was a Republican.
