= Johnny Madison Williams Jr. =

American bank robber

- Born: January 19, 1951 (age 75); Waukegan, Illinois, U.S.
- Other name: Robert James Hall
- Occupation: Bank robber
- Spouse: Carolyn Marie "Carol" Williams
- Status: Released
- Motive: Gambling
- Criminal charges: 5 counts of bank robbery, 1 charge of using a firearm in a crime of violence, and 1 count of conspiracy
- Penalty: prison term of 92 years

Johnny Madison "The Shootist" Williams Jr. (born January 19, 1951) is one of the most successful bank robbers in American history. After his arrest on July 9, 1994, Williams confessed to 56 bank robberies across the states of California, Texas, and Washington state over an eight-year period, beginning in 1986, usually with the help of his wife, Carolyn, usually known as Carol. He kept a meticulous record of his heists, reporting his career total as $879,357.

By the time of his apprehension, the Federal Bureau of Investigation (FBI) were not even aware of 8 of his robberies. The FBI, in the course of tracking Williams, had nicknamed him "The Shootist" after the film by the same name starring John Wayne because of his habit of firing shots into the air at the beginning of each robbery.

Performance art was a large part of Williams' method. His method of firing into the air caused people to avoid eye contact, so authorities had a hard time getting a description of Williams' appearance. The gunshots, in addition to cursing and yelling, provoked a sense of terror, ensuring the teller and customers' compliance.

When I ask the manager or commercial teller if they want to be the next to die, and they can smell the acrid smoke of the gunpowder, and sometimes feel the warmth of the gun barrel next to their skin . . . they feel pretty certain that I have just shot a customer, or have at least shot someone in my past.

— Johnny Madison Williams Jr.,

Williams put a great amount of forethought into each robbery. He would sometimes survey a target for weeks or years, planning out contingencies and escape routes. On several occasions, Williams took a shortcut through shrubbery and then concealed the passage behind foliage. He was described by a spokesman for the San Jose police department as "by far the most calculating and surgical bank robber in the past second half of the 20th century." It is unusual for bank robberies to be well thought out, as they are usually crimes of opportunity.

During his eight-year period of robbing banks, Williams and his wife enjoyed domesticity. He took up bowling and hired a pro for private lessons. When traveling, he packed his bowling ball. He won an Amateur Bowlers' Tour tournament in the amount of $1,200. He registered for the tournament using his real name, address and phone number. Later, he adopted a phony identity, Robert James Hall. He frequently went to Las Vegas "to launder his loot by wagering it on craps tables and sending it into slot machines."

== Prison ==
Williams was sentenced to a prison term of 92 years for the most recent 27 robberies; the rest (29) could not be prosecuted due to expired statute of limitations. His wife, Carolyn Marie "Carol" Williams, was sentenced to 20 years at a federal prison in Northern California.

Carolyn Williams (Register Number: 26492-077) was released from prison on September 16, 2011, according to the United States Bureau of Prisons website.

Johnny Williams (Register Number: 24434-086) was serving his sentence at Victorville Medium II FCI (Victorville, California). His scheduled release date was December 14, 2072, according to the United States Bureau of Prisons website.

On Monday, January 10, 2021, Senior U.S. District Judge Thomas Zilly ordered Williams released after roughly 26 years imprisonment rather than risk his compromised health from exposure to COVID inside federal prisons, including Federal Detention Center-Lompoc (Calif.), to which Williams had been recently transferred.
