= Johnny Williams (American football) =

American football player (1927–2005)

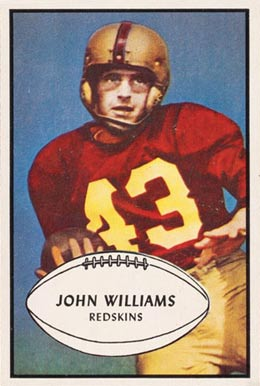
- Williams on a 1953 Bowman football card

No. 43, 25, 86
- Positions: Defensive back, return specialist

Personal information
- Born: June 30, 1927; Los Angeles, California, U.S.
- Died: February 26, 2005 (aged 77); Dana Point, California, U.S.
- Listed height: 5 ft 11 in (1.80 m)
- Listed weight: 177 lb (80 kg)

Career information
- High school: Huntington Park (Huntington Park, California)
- College: USC (1949–1951)
- NFL draft: 1951: 26th round, 304th overall pick

Career history
- Washington Redskins (1952–1953); San Francisco 49ers (1954); Montreal Alouettes (1955)

Awards and highlights
- Second-team All-Pro (1952); Pro Bowl (1952); 2× First-team All-PCC (1950, 1951)

Career NFL statistics
- Interceptions: 14
- Fumble recoveries: 8
- Total touchdowns: 3
- Stats at Pro Football Reference

John Elliott Williams (June 30, 1927 – February 26, 2005) was an American professional football player who was a defensive back and kick returner in the National Football League (NFL) for the Washington Redskins and San Francisco 49ers. He played college football for the USC Trojans and was selected in the 26th round of the 1951 NFL draft.
