= John Williams (cricketer, born 1911) =

English cricketer and soldier

Personal information
- Full name: John Stewart Williams
- Born: 4 January 1911; South Croydon, Surrey, England
- Died: 12 December 1964 (aged 53); Haywards Heath, Sussex, England
- Batting: Left-handed
- Bowling: Right-arm slow

Domestic team information
- Years: Team
- 1931: Oxford University

Career statistics
Competition	First-class
Matches	4
Runs scored	16
Batting average	–
100s/50s	0/0
Top score	16*
Balls bowled	464
Wickets	6
Bowling average	38.16
5 wickets in innings	0
10 wickets in match	0
Best bowling	2/49
Catches/stumpings	0/–
- Source: Cricinfo, 16 April 2020

John Stewart Williams (4 January 1911 – 12 December 1964) was an English first-class cricketer and solicitor.

Williams was born at South Croydon in January 1911. He was educated at Repton School, before going up to Wadham College, Oxford. While studying at Oxford, he played first-class cricket for Oxford University, making four appearances in 1931 against Leicestershire, Gloucestershire, the Free Foresters and the touring New Zealanders. Playing as a right-arm slow bowler, he took six wickets in his four matches at an average of 38.16 and best figures of 2 for 49.

He became a solicitor after graduating from Oxford and was admitted to practice in 1936. Williams served in the Second World War, being commissioned as a second lieutenant in the Corps of Military Police in May 1941. Following the war, he returned to legal practice and succeeded the post of solicitor to the Metropolitan Police in 1961. Williams died three years later in December 1964 at Haywards Heath.
