= Johnny Williams (baseball) =

American baseball player

- Pitcher
- Born: May 1, 1918; Shreveport, Louisiana, U.S.
- Died: May 4, 1986 (aged 68); Shreveport, Louisiana, U.S.
- Batted: Right Threw: Right

Negro league baseball debut
- 1943, for the Birmingham Black Barons

Last appearance
- 1948, for the Indianapolis Clowns

Teams
- Birmingham Black Barons (1943-1944); Cincinnati/Indianapolis Clowns (1944–1948)

John Henry Williams (May 1, 1918 - May 4, 1986), nicknamed "Nature Boy", was an American Negro league pitcher who played in the 1940s.

A native of Shreveport, Louisiana, Williams made his Negro leagues debut in 1943 with the Birmingham Black Barons. He joined the Cincinnati/Indianapolis Clowns in 1944 played for Indianapolis through 1948. He was named to the East–West All-Star Game in 1946 and 1947. Williams went on to play minor league baseball in the 1950s for the Elmira Pioneers and Hornell Dodgers.
