= John Eddie Williams =

American lawyer

John Eddie Williams Jr. is a pharmaceutical injury and mass tort attorney and founding partner of Williams Hart based in Houston.

== Education ==
Williams attended Baylor University and graduated cum laude in 1976. He earned his law degree from Baylor University School of Law in 1978, serving as editor-in-chief of The Baylor Law Review and graduating first in his class.

== Legal career ==
Williams helped to found Williams Hart, a national litigation firm specializing in mass torts and pharmaceutical litigation, in 1983.

Williams served as counselor for the state of Texas in the landmark case brought against Big Tobacco in 1995. The case eventually resulted in a $17.3 billion settlement, at that point the largest legal settlement in American history.

In 2000, Williams represented the family of a worker who had been killed in a June 1999 explosion at the Phillips Petroleum Co. chemical plant in Houston, Texas. The jury in the case eventually decided to grant the family $117 million in damages.

Williams has been involved in some of the largest pharmaceutical injury verdicts and settlements in the United States in recent years, as well as litigation for victims of asbestos exposure and mesothelioma.

In recognition of his success in the legal field, Williams was recognized by Baylor University Law School as the 2002 Baylor Lawyer of the Year. Additionally, he was named Baylor University's Alumnus of the Year for 2012–13.

== Personal ==
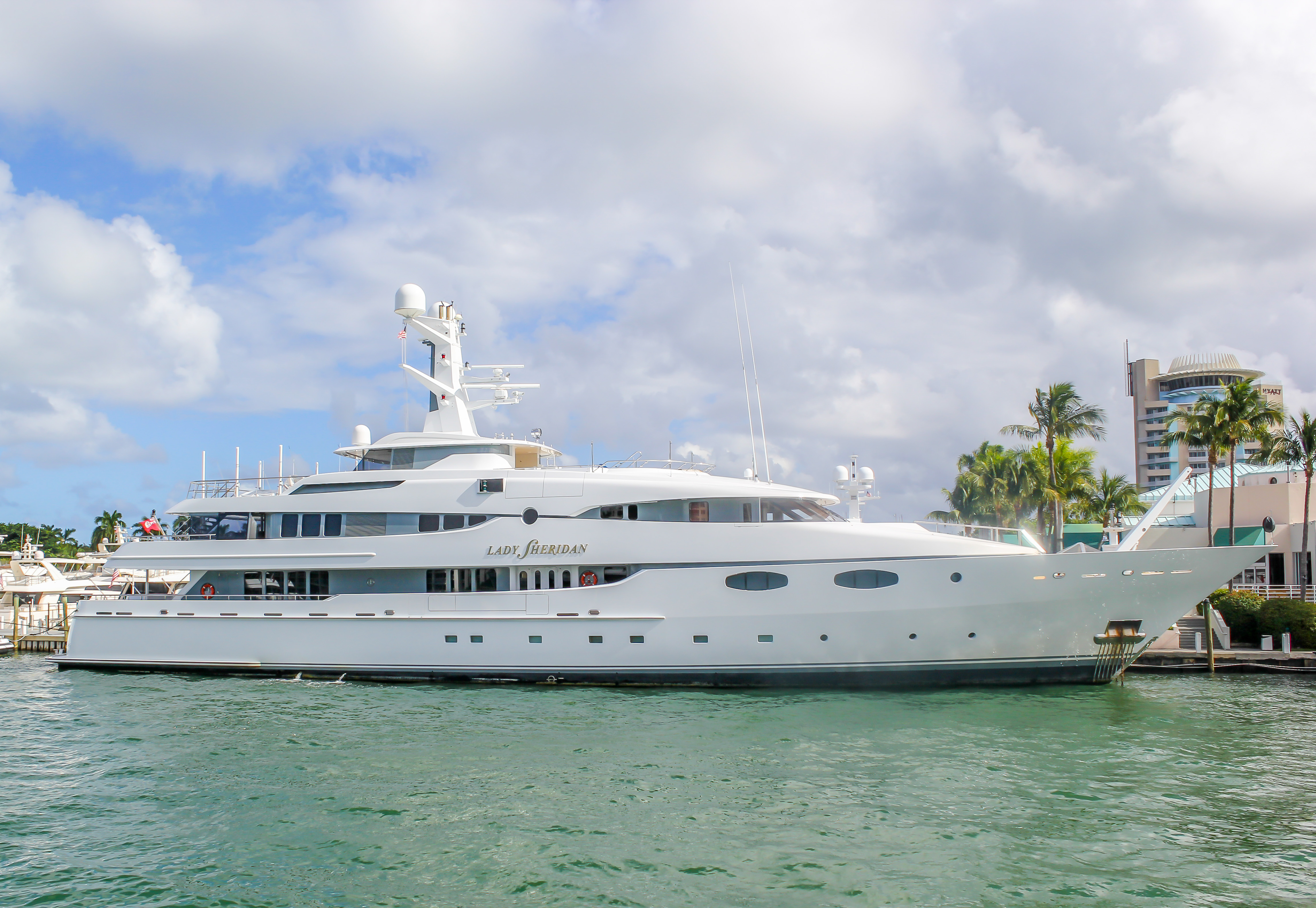
The Lady Sheridan

John Eddie and his wife Sheridan live in Houston. They have played a prominent role in a wide range of philanthropic efforts in the community, including substantial donations to the University of Texas MD Anderson Cancer Center and the Houston Chronicle's Goodfellows program. Additionally, the field at Baylor University's new football stadium will be named John Eddie Williams Field in recognition of Williams' substantial donations to the program. John Eddie owns a ranch named Rio Vista Ranch near Del Rio, Texas. The ranch is 18,000 acres (73 km^{2}) and features multiple homes, a private airport and well as a wide range of game to hunt. John Eddie also owns a large yacht named the Lady Sheridan. John Eddie and Sheridan renewed the vows on board the Lady Sheridan in 2013, on the French Riviera.
