= J. Lloyd Williams =

Welsh botanist and music writer (1854–1945)

John Lloyd Williams (10 July 1854 – 15 November 1945) was a Welsh botanist, author, and musician. He was one of the founders of the Welsh Folk-Song Society (Cymdeithas Alawon Gwerin Cymru), established in 1906 to promote the collection and study of traditional Welsh folk songs, and became the first editor of the society's journal.

== Biography ==
Williams was born at Plas Isa, Llanrwst, a house that had once been owned by the 16th-century translator, William Salesbury. He was the first of seven children; his parents were Robert Williams, a quarryman, and his wife Jane. Although largely uneducated herself, Jane Williams had an interest in botany which she passed down to her son. In 1873, having first worked as a pupil teacher, he became a student at Bangor Normal College. In 1875, he was appointed head of the Board School at Garndolbenmaen. While working there, he indulged his love of music by writing operas for the school to perform. He married Elizabeth Jones of Criccieth, and they had two sons.

Williams went on to do research at the Royal College of Science, London, during the 1890s. He lectured in botany at the University College of North Wales, Bangor, and acted as director of music for that college. In 1908, he was awarded the degree of DSc. He was also an advisor to the board of agriculture at Bangor, during the years 1912–15. He subsequently became professor of botany at the University College of Wales, Aberystwyth, from 1915 until he retired in 1925. His research on marine algae, coming to similar conclusions to Camille Sauvageau in France, was not published until 1921, when he was in his sixties. He was responsible for identifying the first juncus macer species in Wales.

In 1931 Williams became editor of the music magazine Y Cerddor. He and Arthur Somervell were the editors of Welsh Melodies (Boosey & Co., 1907 and 1909), a collection of genuine old Welsh music considered to be of exceptionally fine quality. Many songs in the collection had never been in print in other published song collections. He also presented a paper to the Honourable Society of Cymmrodorion on 22 January 1908, entitled Welsh National Melodies and Folk-Songs. In 1906, he had been involved in the creation of the Welsh Folk-Song Society, along with Harry Reichel, Alfred Perceval Graves, and others. At Bangor he founded a choir of students, "Y Canorion", who specialised in traditional Welsh folk songs. They assisted in finding and cataloguing songs, resulting in the establishment of a large collection.

== Publications ==
- Y Tri Thelynor
- Atgofion Tri Chwarter Canrif (autobiography in 4 volumes)
- Byd y Blodau
- Flowers of the Wayside and Meadow (1927) ASIN B0008CJUW4

== Musical works ==
- Aelwyd Angharad (operetta) (1910)
- Cadifor (operetta)
- Nos Calan Gaeaf (cantata)
