= John Owen Williams (Pedrog) =

Welsh congregational minister (1853–1932)

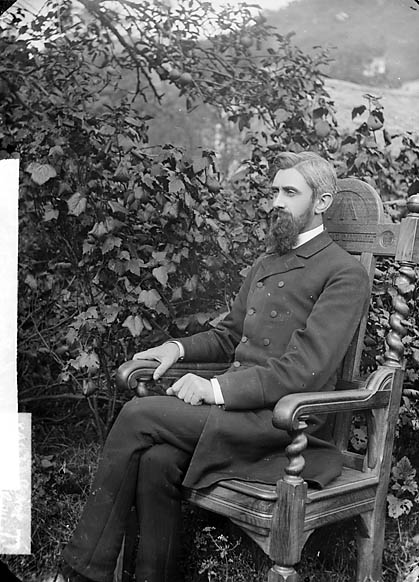
Williams sitting on his bardic chair, c. 1885

John Owen Williams (1853–1932) was a Welsh Congregational minister and poet who served as Archdruid.

Pedrog was born in May 1853 in Madryn, near Pwllheli, the youngest son of Owen and Martha Williams, both of whom were in service locally. He had a tragic childhood. At the age of two he was sent to stay with his father’s sister Jane Owen, in Llanbedrog, when his elder brother contracted smallpox. A few years later his mother died in childbirth. His father then decided to go to sea as a ship’s steward but his first voyage seemingly ended in a Melbourne hospital where he died. Pedrog's memories of both his parents were few and hazy.

While resident in Liverpool, Pedrog joined the Welsh Wesleyan church in Chester. From there he moved to a Congregationalist church in Liverpool, of which he later became minister of that church, and was ordained in May 1884. A prolific writer and Eisteddfod competitor, he won his first eisteddfod chair in 1887. Thereafter he won the Chair at the National Eisteddfod in 1891, 1895 and 1900.

In 1928, Pedrog replaced Elfed as Archdruid, and officiated over the National Eisteddfod in that role until 1932. He also inaugurated the Gorsedd of Cornwall in 1928.

Preceded by Howell Elvet Lewis	Archdruid of the National Eisteddfod of Wales; 1928–1932	Succeeded by John Jenkins (Gwili)
