= John Bickerton Williams =

English nonconformist author and lawyer

Sir John Bickerton Williams
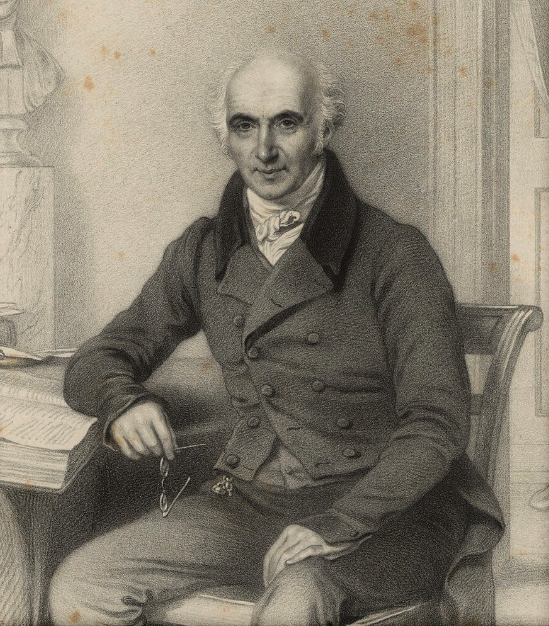
- Born: 4 March 1792
- Died: 21 October 1855 (aged 63)
- Occupations: Author, Attorney
- Spouse: Elizabeth Robins (27 December 1813)
- Children: 5

Sir John Bickerton Williams (4 March 1792 – 21 October 1855) was an English nonconformist author and lawyer. He was knighted by Queen Victoria in 1837.

== Life ==
Williams was born at Sandford Hall, at West Felton, Shropshire in the United Kingdom on 4 March 1792, the son of William Williams and Hannah Bickerton. Early in his life, his parents moved to Wem in Shropshire. He received his early education at the free school (now Thomas Adams School) in Wem. He became a member of the congregational church at Wem in the autumn of 1809. Williams began to gather a large collection of manuscripts by Phillip and Matthew Henry and other nonconformist theologians. He spent his leisure time writing.

Williams studied law and he became an apprentice on 17 February 1806 to an attorney in Wem. After a residence in Liverpool from 1811 to 1815, he was admitted an attorney on 23 January 1816. William moved to Shrewsbury and commenced a law practice.

=== Marriage ===
Williams married Elizabeth Robins on 27 December 1813. He had three sons and two daughters.

=== Political career ===
On the passing of the Municipal Reform Act in 1835, Williams was elected an alderman of Shrewsbury, and in November 1836 was appointed mayor. In that capacity he presented an address to the Duke of Sussex at Kimnel Park.

On 19 July 1837, at the duke's request, he was knighted at St. James's Palace by Queen Victoria. He was the first to be knighted by the Queen in her reign. He was elected F.S.A. in 1824, and a fellow of the American Antiquarian Society in 1838, and received the degree of LL.D. from Middleburg College, Vermont, U.S.A., in 1831.

=== Death ===
Williams retired from law practice at Shrewsbury in March 1841 and moved back to Wem where he lived at The Hall, a Georgian house in New Street. He died at Wem on 21 October 1855 and was buried in the cemetery in Chapel Street on the 27th. His widow died at Wem on 23 February 1872 and was buried in the cemetery in Chapel Street.

== Bibliography ==
- Eighteen Sermons of the Rev. Philip Henry (1816)
- Memoirs of the Life and Character of Mrs. Sarah Savage eldest daughter of the Rev. Philip Henry (1818)
- Memoirs of Mrs. Hulton (1820)
- The miscellaneous works of the Rev. Matthew Henry 1830
- Memoirs of Sir Matthew Hale, Knight, Lord Chief Justice of England (1835)
- Letters on Puritanism and Nonconformity
- Gleanings of Heavenly Wisdom; or, the Sayings of John Dod, M.A., and Philip Henry, M.A. (1851)
