= 16th century in Wales =

- 15th century | 17th century | Other years in Wales
- Other events of the century

This article is about the particular significance of the century 1501–1600 to Wales and its people.

== Events ==
1501

- 2 October - Catherine of Aragon arrives at Plymouth, England, in readiness for her marriage to the Prince of Wales.
- 14 November - Arthur, Prince of Wales, marries Catherine of Aragon at St Paul's Cathedral; Catherine thus becomes Princess of Wales.
- 21 December - The Prince and Princess of Wales leave London for their seat at Ludlow Castle. Sir Richard Pole is among the retinue that accompanies the couple.

1502

- March - The Prince and Princess of Wales are both afflicted by an unknown illness, "a malign vapour which proceeded from the air". It would prove fatal for the prince.
- 4 April - News reaches King Henry VII of England of the death of the Prince of Wales; he is grief-stricken.
- 23 April - Three weeks after his sudden death, the body of Arthur, Prince of Wales, is removed from Ludlow Castle and taken to the Parish Church of Ludlow.
- 25 April - The Prince of Wales is buried at the Abbey of St Wulfstan in Worcester. His widow, Catherine, now Dowager Princess of Wales, is too ill to attend her husband's funeral, suffering from the same mystery illness that is thought to have killed him.
- August
  - William Smyth, Bishop of Lincoln, becomes President of the Council of Wales and the Marches.
  - King Henry VII of England is believed to have visited Troy House, near Monmouth, the home of Blanche Herbert and her second husband, Sir William Herbert, an illegitimate son of William Herbert, 1st Earl of Pembroke.

1503

- 25 June - Catherine of Aragon, Dowager Princess of Wales, is formally betrothed to her brother-in-law, Prince Henry. Catherine comes out of mourning.

1504

- 18 February - Henry, Duke of York, is invested as Prince of Wales.
- 30 August - John Penny is appointed Bishop of Bangor.

1505

- 9 May - Sir William Herbert of Troy (illegitimate son of the late Earl of Pembroke) gives an undertaking to keep the peace with his half-brother, Sir Walter Herbert of Raglan (who was brother-in-law of Edward Stafford, 3rd Duke of Buckingham), and with Henry Myles, his brother-in-law (the father of Blanche Parry).
- 11 May - Robert Sherborne is consecrated Bishop of St David's.

1506

- April - The betrothal of Prince Henry to the Dowager Princess of Wales (1503) is declared invalid (Henry's age at the time is used as a pretext).
- Construction begins on tower of St Giles' Church, Wrexham.

1507

- Restrictions in the borough of Caernarfon are eased: the Welsh are allowed to live inside the town walls.

1508

- 18 September - Robert Sherborne, Bishop of St David's, is translated to the see of Chichester. St David's remains without a bishop until the following year.
- 22 September - John Penny, Bishop of Bangor, is translated to the see of Carlisle; Bangor remains without a bishop until the following year.
- The lordship of Dyffryn Clwyd is sold to King Henry VII of England by the incumbent Richard Grey, 3rd Earl of Kent.
- Chepstow Castle becomes the property of Charles Somerset, 1st Earl of Worcester.
- Construction of Hendre'r Ywydd Uchaf farmhouse, now an exhibit at St Fagans National History Museum.

1509

- 21 April - Following his father's death, the Prince of Wales becomes King Henry VIII of England.
- 11 June - The new King, Henry VIII, marries the Dowager Princess of Wales, Catherine of Aragon, at Greenwich.
- 17 June - Thomas Skevington is consecrated Bishop of Bangor.
- 22 July - Edward Vaughan is consecrated Bishop of St David's.

1510

- Elis Gruffydd joins the English army.

1512

- Bishop Godfrey Blyth replaces Bishop William Smyth as President of the Council of Wales and the Marches.

1516

- Sir Thomas Phillips is appointed High Sheriff of Carmarthenshire.
- Sir William Herbert of Troy Parva is knighted; his wife, Blanche Herbert, is thereafter called Lady Troy.

1517

- Lady Catherine Gordon marries her third husband, Matthew Craddock, and obtains permission to live with him in Wales when not at court.

1519

- Sir John Puleston is granted the lordship of Denbigh and Denbighland by King Henry VIII.

1524

- 2 December - Chepstow is granted its first charter.

1525

- September - Princess Mary, heir to the throne, is sent to Ludlow Castle to preside over the Council of Wales and the Marches. Her retinue includes Susan Clarencieux.

1531

- 4 December - Rhys ap Gruffudd of Carew Castle is executed for treason.

1534

- May - The notoriously anti-Welsh Rowland Lee, newly appointed Bishop of Lichfield, is appointed President of the Council of Wales and the Marches by Thomas Cromwell.
- 22 July - Henry Somerset is appointed chief justice in eyre of Newport, Wentllwg and Machen.

1536

- The Laws in Wales Act 1542 (27 Hen. 8 c. 26), An Acte for Lawes & Justice to be ministred in Wales in like fourme as it is in this Realme, "unites" Wales with England and gives Wales parliamentary representation.
- Dissolution of the Monasteries - Abergavenny Priory, Basingwerk Abbey, Caldey Island Priory, Chepstow Priory, Cymer Abbey, Ewenny Priory, Grace Dieu Abbey, Haverfordwest Priory, Kidwelly Priory, Llanllugan Abbey, Llanllyr Priory, Margam Abbey, Monmouth Priory, Pill Priory, St Dogmaels Abbey, Strata Marcella Abbey, Talley Abbey and Usk Priory are suppressed

1537

- Dissolution of the Monasteries - Bardsey Abbey, Cwmhir Abbey and Valle Crucis Abbey are suppressed.

1538

- Dissolution of the Monasteries - Bangor Friary, Beddgelert Priory, Brecon Friary and Brecon Cathedral Priory, Cardiff Blackfriars and Greyfriars, Cardigan Priory, Carmarthen Friary, Denbigh Friary, Haverfordwest Abbey, Llanfaes Friary, Llanthony Priory, Maenan Abbey, Newport Friary, Penrhys Grange and Rhuddlan Friary are suppressed.

1539

- Dissolution of the Monasteries - Kidwelly Priory, Malpas Priory, Neath Abbey, Strata Florida Abbey, Tintern Abbey and Whitland Abbey are suppressed.

1540

- A Carmarthenshire land dispute becomes the last recorded case to be heard under Welsh law, four years after the 1536 Act stipulated that only English law was to be used in Wales.

1541

- Foundation of Christ College, Brecon.

1542

- Laws in Wales Act 1542 (34 & 35 Hen. 8 c. 26) An Acte for certaine Ordinaunces in the Kinges Majesties Domynion and Principalitie of Wales. extends the effects of the Laws in Wales Act 1535.

1546

- The first printed book in Welsh, the clergy manual Yny lhyvyr hwnn, is published in London; it is written anonymously by Sir John Prise of Brecon.

1550

- Walter Devereux is created Viscount Hereford.

1551

- 10 October - William Herbert is created Baron Herbert of Cardiff.

1553

- Nicholas Heath is made President of the Council of Wales and the Marches by Queen Mary I of England.

1557

- 8 July - The will of Geoffrey Glyn leaves a bequest leading to the foundation of Friars School, Bangor.

1558

- November - Thomas Parry, faithful servant of Princess Elizabeth, is made Comptroller of the Household on her accession to the throne, as well as receiving a knighthood.

1559

- 5 January - Sir Thomas Parry is elected MP for Hertfordshire.
- November - George Constantine is made Archdeacon of Brecon.

1563

- The new stone bridge over the River Usk at Brecon is built, replacing an earlier structure.

1565

- Blanche Parry is appointed Keeper of the Queen's Books and Jewels.
- John Beddoes School is founded at Presteigne.

1566

- First brass wire drawing works in the British Isles established at Tintern.
- Twelve-year-old Philip Sidney is presented by his father, Sir Henry Sidney, to the lay rectory of Whitford, Flintshire, then worth £60 a year.

1568

- 26 May - A "congress of bards and musicians" takes place at Caerwys, on the orders of a commission appointed by Queen Elizabeth I of England.

1570

- John Caius, in his book De Canibus Britannicis, describes Welsh Springer Spaniels as "Spaniels whose skynnes are white and if marked with any spottes they are commonly red".

1571

- 27 June - Foundation of Jesus College, Oxford, by David Lewis.

1573

- First publication of Humphrey Llwyd's Cambriae Typus in the Theatrum Orbis Terrarum (Antwerp); the earliest map of Wales.

1574

- Re-foundation of Ruthin School by Gabriel Goodman.

1576

- The route for the weekly post to Ireland established by Queen Elizabeth I is switched from Liverpool to Holyhead.

1577

- 21 April - Mary Sidney marries Henry Herbert, 2nd Earl of Pembroke.

1578

- Maurice Clenock becomes Warden of the English College, Rome.

1584

- 23 September - Robert Sidney marries heiress Barbara Gamage, at St Donat's Castle, the home of her guardian Sir Edward Stradling.
- Copper-working begins at Aberdulais Falls.

1587

- 14 April - A clandestine Roman Catholic printing press is discovered in a cave on the Little Orme on the north coast where it has been used by the recusant Robert Pugh (squire of Penrhyn Hall) and his chaplain Father William Davies to print Y Drych Cristianogawl ("The Christian Mirror"), the first book to be printed in Wales.

1588

- Bishop William Morgan's Bible translation into Welsh, Y Bibl Cyssegr-lan, is published.

1589

- A blast furnace at Angelton (or Angleton) in the Ogmore Valley.

1595

- February - A riot breaks out in Cardiff as the result of the activities of Sir William Herbert (a relative of the Earl of Pembroke) and his henchmen.

1596

- Sir William and Nicholas Herbert are convicted by the Court of Star Chamber, gaoled in the Fleet Prison, and fined 1000 marks for their part in the previous year's affair.

1597

- 10 November - Richard Vaughan is enthroned as Bishop of Chester.
- date unknown
  - William Herbert becomes MP for Montgomeryshire.
  - William Maurice is re-elected MP for Carnarvonshire.
  - Sir James Perrot becomes MP for Haverfordwest

== Arts and literature ==
=== Books ===
1502

- Rhys Nanmor - Elegy on the death of Arthur, Prince of Wales

1540

- Robert Recorde - The Grounde of Artes

1542

- Andrew Boorde - Fyrst Boke of the Introduction of Knowledge

1546

- Sir John Price - Yn y Llyvyr Hwn (first Welsh language book to be printed)

1547

- William Salesbury - A dictionary in Englyshe and Welshe, moche necessary to all suche Welshemen as wil spedly learne the Englyshe tongue

1550

- William Salesbury
  - The baterie of the Popes Botereulx, commonlye called the high Altare
  - Ban wedy i dynny air yngair alla o ben gyfreith Howel da... A certaine case extracte out of the Auncient Law of Hoel da... whereby it may be gathered that priestes had lawfully maried wyues at that tyme
  - A briefe and a playne introduction, teachyng how to pronounce the letters in the British tong (now commenly called Walsh)...

1556

- Robert Recorde - The Castle of Knowledge, containing the Explication of the Sphere both Celestiall and Materiall, etc.

1559

- Humphrey Llwyd - Cronica Walliae

1564

- John Dee - Monas Hieroglyphica

1567

- Gruffydd Robert - Dosparth Byrr ar y rhan gyntaf i ramadeg cymraeg
- William Salesbury - A briefe and a playne introduction, 2nd edn
- William Salesbury - translations into Welsh
  - Testament Newydd ein Arglwydd Jesu Christ (the New Testament; the first published Bible translation into Welsh (7 October), from the Greek)
  - Llyfr Gweddi Gyffredin (the Book of Common Prayer)

1568

- Maurice Clenock - Athravaeth Gristnogavl (printed in Milan)

1573

- Sir John Prys - Historiae Britannicae Defensio (published posthumously)

1584

- David Powel - Historie of Cambria

c. 1586-7

- "G.R. of Milan" (Gruffydd Robert or perhaps Robert Gwyn (c. 1540/50-1592/1604)) - Y Drych Cristianogawl (first part; the first book printed in Wales, on the clandestine Catholic press on the Little Orme, with a false imprint of "Rouen, 1585")

1587

- Morris Kyffin - The Blessedness of Britayne

1589

- John Penry - Exhortation to the governours and people of Wales...

1594

- Morris Kyffin - Deffyniad Ffydd Eglwys Lloegr

1595

- Robert Holland - Dau Gymro yn Taring yn bell o'u Gwlad

1600

- Robert Holland - Darmerth, neu Arlwy i Weddi
- William Vaughan - Golden Grove

== Births ==
1504

- date unknown - William Glyn, bishop (died 1558)

1505

- date unknown - Rowland Meyrick, bishop (died 1566)

1510

- approximate date - Thomas Phaer, lawyer, paediatrician and translator (died 1560)

1511

- 1 January - Henry, Duke of Cornwall, son of King Henry VIII of England and Catherine of Aragon and prospective Prince of Wales (died 23 February of the same year)
- approximate date - Thomas Davies, Bishop of St Asaph (died 1573)

1512

- approximate date - Robert Recorde, mathematician (died 1558)

1515

- approximate date - Thomas Parry, Comptroller of the Household of Queen Elizabeth I of England (died 1560)

1527

- 13 July - John Dee, mathematician and occultist (died 1609)

1528

- 6 November - Gabriel Goodman, founder of Ruthin School (died 1601)
- 7 November - John Perrot, Lord Deputy of Ireland (died 1592)

1534

- date unknown - Henry Herbert, 2nd Earl of Pembroke, statesman (died 1601)

1546

- date unknown - Thomas Morgan (of Llantarnam), conspirator (died 1606)

1558

- Richard Trevor, politician (died 1638)

1560

- date unknown - Hugh Myddelton, goldsmith and hydraulic engineer (died 1631)

1565

- date unknown - Peter Mutton, politician and judge (died 1637)

1572

- Thomas Tomkins, composer (died 1656)

1575

- 9 December - Augustine Baker, Benedictine mystic (died 1641)
- date unknown - William Vaughan, writer and colonial investor (died 1641)

1582

- 22 March - John Williams, Archbishop of York (died 1650)

1587

- 24 June - William Arnold, Welsh-descended American settler

1592

- date unknown - Sir Owen Wynn, 3rd Baronet (died 1660)

== Deaths ==
1500

- 1 October - John Alcock, Tudor supporter and Lord President of the Council of Wales and the Marches

1502

- 2 April - Arthur, Prince of Wales, 15

1503

- date unknown
  - Richard Amerike, English merchant, royal customs officer and sheriff, of Welsh descent
  - Sir John Donne, courtier, diplomat and soldier, commissioner of the Donne Triptych

1505

- date unknown - Sir Thomas Salusbury, Tudor supporter

1509

- 21 April - King Henry VII, Pembroke-born King of England, 52
- 29 June - Lady Margaret Beaufort, widow of Edmund Tudor and mother of King Henry VII, 66

1510

- date unknown - Rhys Fawr ap Maredudd, Welsh nobleman and Tudor adherent

1512

- 12 February - David ap Owen, Bishop of St Asaph

1513

- approximate date - Rhys Nanmor, poet

1514

- 3 April - Sir Thomas Englefield, Welsh landowner and Speaker of the House of Commons

1521

- date unknown - Gruffydd ap Rhys ap Thomas, nobleman

1525

- Spring - Sir Rhys ap Thomas, Tudor supporter, 75?

1526

- 15 April - Charles Somerset, 1st Earl of Worcester, also Lord Herbert, 65/66

1531

- July - Sir Matthew Craddock, Steward of Gower and Seneschal of Kenfig

1537

- October - Lady Catherine Gordon, widow of Sir Matthew Craddock, about 63 (buried at St Mary's Church, Swansea)

1543

- 28 January - Rowland Lee, Lord President of the Council of Wales and the Marches

1549

- 26 November - Henry Somerset, 2nd Earl of Worcester

1554

- 18 May - William Thomas (executed)
- 24 December - 80 "red-headed bandits of Mawddach" (executed)

1555

- March (probable) - Rawlins White, fisherman, 70? (executed by burning at Cardiff)
- 30 March - Robert Ferrar, former Bishop of St David's (executed by burning at Carmarthen)
- 15 October - Sir John Prys, notary public to King Henry VIII, 53?
- 15 November - Robert Holgate, former Bishop of Llandaff

1558

- 9 April - William Nichol, Protestant martyr
- 21 May - William Glyn, bishop
- date unknown - Robert Recorde, mathematician

1559

- 10 April - Sir Rice Mansel, admiral

1560

- 12 August - Thomas Phaer, paediatrician and politician (b. c.1510)
- 15 December - Sir Thomas Parry (b. c.1515)

1564

- date unknown - Gruffudd Hiraethog, poet

1570

- March–July - Sir Richard Clough, merchant
- 17 March - William Herbert, 1st Earl of Pembroke

1574

- August - Hugh Price, lawyer

1581

- 7 November - Richard Davies, bishop
- date unknown - Maurice Clenock, Recusant author

1584

- 27 April - David Lewis, lawyer, founder of Jesus College, Oxford
- 15 October - Richard Gwyn, Catholic martyr, 47
- probable - William Salesbury, translator of the New Testament into Welsh

1585

- 2 March - William Parry, conspirator (executed)

1586

- 5 May - Henry Sidney, President of the Council of Wales, 56
- 20 September - Thomas Salisbury, conspirator (executed), 22?
- date unknown - Griffith Lloyd, Principal of Jesus College, Oxford

1589

- 21 February - William Somerset, 3rd Earl of Worcester

1590

- 12 February - Blanche Parry, gentlewoman to Queen Elizabeth I, 81?

1591

- 27 August - Katheryn of Berain, much-married heiress, 56
- 15 October - William Blethyn, Bishop of Llandaff

1592

- 3 November - Sir John Perrot, Lord Deputy of Ireland, 63

1593

- 29 May - John Penry, Protestant martyr, 33

1595

- 12 December - Roger Williams, soldier of fortune, 55?
- date unknown - Meurig Dafydd, poet, about 85

1596

- October - Richard Herbert, politician and judge
- date unknown - Wiliam Midleton, poet, about 46

1597

- 3 August - Richard Meredith, Bishop of Leighlin, 47?

1598

- 2 January - Morris Kyffin, soldier and author, 43?
- 12 July - John Jones, Catholic martyr
- 4 August - William Cecil, 1st Baron Burghley, politician of Welsh descent
