= 15th century in Wales =

- 14th century | 16th century | Other years in Wales
- Other events of the century

This article is about the particular significance of the century 1401–1500 to Wales and its people.

== Events ==
1401

- 1 April (Good Friday) - Conwy Castle is taken by supporters of Owain Glyndŵr.
- June - Battle of Mynydd Hyddgen, first major victory for Owain Glyndŵr's Welsh rebels over the English.
- 2 November - At the inconclusive Battle of Tuthill, Owain Glyndŵr's forces meet the English near Caernarfon.

1402

- April - Owain Glyndŵr captures his arch-enemy, Reginald Grey, 3rd Baron Grey de Ruthyn.
- 22 June - Battle of Bryn Glas (also known as the Battle of Pilleth) on the border with England ends in victory for Glyndŵr. The Welsh capture Edmund Mortimer, son of the 3rd Earl, who defects to the Welsh cause, on 30 November marrying Owain's daughter Catrin.
- August - Glamorgan joins Glyndŵr's revolt.
- September - The English Parliament passes penal Laws against Wales which stop the Welsh from gathering together, obtaining office, carrying arms and living in English towns. Any Englishman who marries a Welsh woman also comes under the laws.

1403

- 15 May - Henry, Prince of Wales, and his men destroy Sycharth, one of the residences of Owain Glyndŵr.
- July - Owain Glyndŵr captures Carreg Cennen Castle.
- 21 July - Battle of Shrewsbury ends in defeat and death of Henry Percy, an ally of Owain Glyndŵr. Henry of Monmouth is seriously wounded in the battle.
- Autumn (possible) - Battle of Stalling Down near Cowbridge.

1404

- July - Owain Glyndŵr holds a parliament at Machynlleth.
- November - The Prince of Wales and his brother Thomas of Lancaster unsuccessfully try to raise the siege of Coity Castle.

1405

- 28 February - Glyndŵr Rising at its peak. Tripartite Indenture agreed between Owain Glyndŵr, the Earl of Northumberland, and Edmund Mortimer, to divide Wales and England between them.
- 5 May - Battle of Pwll Melyn - first major defeat for Glyndŵr.
- July - A French force arrives at Milford Haven to assist the rebels. It takes the town of Haverfordwest, retakes Carmarthen and lays siege to Tenby, perhaps marching as far as Great Witley across the English border, but then retires.
- August - Owain Glyndŵr holds his second parliament, at Harlech Castle.

1406

- 31 March - Owain Glyndŵr writes the "Pennal letter" to the King of France, outlining his policy for the future government of Wales and support for the Avignon Papacy.

1407

- June - Henry, Prince of Wales, lays siege to Aberystwyth Castle.
- 4 October - The Pope appoints Henry Chichele Bishop of St David's.

1408

- Adam of Usk returns to Wales from continental exile, seeking the patronage of Owain Glyndŵr.

1409

- Harlech Castle is captured by Henry of Monmouth. Margaret Hanmer (Glyndŵr's wife), her children and grandchildren are taken prisoner. As far as is known, most of them later die in captivity.

1410

- Sir John Scudamore marries Alys, daughter of Owain Glyndŵr.

1411

- Sir William Gamage succeeds to the Coity estates on the death of Sir Laurence Berkerolles, and lays siege to Coity Castle.

1412

- June - The seneschal and the receiver of Brecon negotiate to ransom Dafydd Gam from his captivity in the hands of Owain Glyndŵr.

1415

- 21 September - Owain Glyndŵr goes into hiding. His subsequent whereabouts and date of death are unknown. End of the Glyndŵr Rising.
- 25 October - Battle of Agincourt. Welsh archers are key to Henry V's victory over a much larger French army.

1417

- 30 April - Maredudd ab Owain Glyndŵr declines the offer of a pardon from King Henry V of England.

1418

- Gruffydd Young, Owain's former Chancellor, is appointed Bishop of Ross.

1419

- 24 April - Philip Morgan is elected Bishop of Worcester.

1420

- 16 October - In the new parliament, Roger Corbet and David Rathbone become MPs for the borough of Shrewsbury, while Roger's brother Robert represents Shropshire.
- 4 March - Settlement made at Shrewsbury between Edward Cherleton, Lord of Powys, and Sir Gruffudd Vaughan, his brother Ieuan ap Gruffydd, and two yeomen for the capture of Sir John Oldcastle in 1417.

1421

- Maredudd ab Owain Glyndŵr accepts a pardon from King Henry V of England.

1425

- Iron forge at Pontypool operating by about this date.

1426

- William ap Thomas, ancestor of the Herbert Earls of Pembroke, is knighted.

1428

- Earliest likely date for marriage of Catherine of Valois, widow of Henry V, to Welsh courtier Owen Tudor, thus establishing the House of Tudor.

1435

- Work begins on the construction of Raglan Castle (approximate).

1437

- January - Owen Tudor is imprisoned at Newgate Prison following the death of his wife, Catherine of Valois.

1450

- April - William Herbert, 1st Earl of Pembroke, is taken prisoner at the Battle of Formigny.
- Eisteddfod at Carmarthen: Dafydd ab Edmwnd wins the silver chair for his poetry.

1452

- 7 July - Eleanor, Duchess of Gloucester, exiled after her conviction for sorcery in 1442, dies at Beaumaris Castle.
- 23 November - King Henry VI of England acknowledges his half-brothers, Edmund and Jasper Tudor. Edmund becomes Earl of Richmond. Jasper becomes Earl of Pembroke.

1455

- 1 November - Edmund Tudor, 1st Earl of Richmond, marries Lady Margaret Beaufort.

1456

- August - Edmund Tudor, 1st Earl of Richmond, is captured by the Yorkists and imprisoned at Carmarthen Castle, where he dies on 3 November of plague.

1457

- 28 January - Lady Margaret Beaufort, 13-year-old widow of Edmund Tudor, gives birth to Henry Tudor, later King Henry VII of England, at Pembroke Castle.
- Sir Walter Griffith purchases Burton Agnes Hall in Yorkshire.

1460

- 10 July - Following defeat at the Battle of Northampton on this date, Margaret of Anjou, queen of England, escapes with her son, Edward, Prince of Wales, to Harlech Castle.
- 23 July - John De la Bere resigns as Bishop of St David's after supporting the Tudors in the civil war.

1461

- February - After losing the Battle of Mortimer's Cross, Jasper Tudor is placed under an attainder. William Herbert, Lord Herbert of Raglan, assumes the guardianship of Margaret Beaufort and her son Henry, Earl of Richmond.

1467

- Sir William Stanley is appointed steward of the lordship of Bromfield and Yale.

1468

- 24 June - Richard Neville, 16th Earl of Warwick, grants a charter to Neath Abbey.
- 14 August - The garrison of Harlech Castle surrenders to King Edward IV after a seven-year siege.

1469

- 27 July - Following the Battle of Edgecote Moor, William Herbert, 1st Earl of Pembroke, and his brother Richard are executed.
- August - Richard Woodville, 1st Earl Rivers, and his son John Woodville are placed in prison in Chepstow.

1470

- 13 December - Edward of Westminster, Prince of Wales, marries (or is betrothed to) Anne Neville.

1471

- 4 May - Battle of Tewkesbury ends Lancastrian hopes of regaining the ascendance over the House of York. King Edward IV of England is victorious, and Edward of Westminster becomes the only Prince of Wales ever to die in battle. Sir John Donne is knighted on the field.
- 26 June - Prince Edward, son of King Edward IV, is invested as Prince of Wales.
- 13 October - Richard Redman is consecrated as Bishop of St Asaph.

1472

- October - Following his investiture, Edward, Prince of Wales, takes up residence at Ludlow Castle, the seat of the Council of Wales and the Marches.

1473

- Anthony Woodville, 2nd Earl Rivers, is appointed Governor of the Prince of Wales's Household. John Alcock, Bishop of Rochester and the prince's tutor, becomes President of the Council of Wales and the Marches.

1478

- 18 February - On the death of his brother George, Duke of Clarence, Richard, Duke of Gloucester, becomes Lord of Glamorgan by right of his wife Anne Neville.
- 10 April - The Court of the President and Council of Wales holds its first session in Ludlow.
- 6 September - John Marshall is consecrated Bishop of Llandaff.

1483

- 14 April - At Ludlow, 12-year-old King Edward V of England receives the news of his father's sudden death and his own accession.
- 8 September - Edward of Middleham, son of King Richard III of England, is invested as Prince of Wales at York Minster.
- 25 December - At Rennes Cathedral, Henry, Earl of Richmond, pledges to marry Elizabeth of York.

1485

- 22 August - Battle of Bosworth Field: Henry Tudor defeats King Richard III to become the third and last Welsh-born King of England.
- 7 November - Jasper Tudor marries Catherine Woodville.

1486

- 18 January - King Henry VII marries Elizabeth of York.
- 2 March - Jasper Tudor becomes Lord of Glamorgan.

1488

- Jasper Tudor takes possession of Cardiff Castle.

1489

- 29 November - The English-born Arthur Tudor is named Prince of Wales.

1490

- 27 February - Arthur Tudor is ceremonially invested as Prince of Wales at the Palace of Westminster.

1495

- 16 February - Sir William Stanley is executed for treason in London; Henry VII of England seizes Holt Castle from him.

1496

- A public convenience is built on the "Old Welsh Bridge" in Shrewsbury.

1498

- An insurrection breaks out in Meirionnydd in north Wales; the rebels capture Harlech Castle. The revolt is the last of the medieval era in Wales.

== Works ==
1450s

- Reginald Pecock - Represser of over-much weeting [blaming] of the Clergie (1455)

1460s-1480s

- Peniarth 51 (c. 1460)
- Peniarth 109

== Births ==
1401

- 27 October - Catherine of Valois, French-born wife of King Henry V of England and later of Owen Tudor (d. 1437)

1430

- 11 June (possible date) - Edmund Tudor, 1st Earl of Richmond (d. 1456)

1431

- unknown date - Jasper Tudor, soldier (d. 1495)

1444

- 14 February - Anne Beauchamp, 15th Countess of Warwick (d. 1449)

1451

- 5 March - William Herbert, 2nd Earl of Pembroke (d. 1491)

1453

- 13 October - Edward of Westminster, Prince of Wales (d. 1471)

1457

- 28 January - Henry Tudor, later King Henry VII of England (d. 1509)

1470

- 4 November - Edward "of the Sanctuary", later Prince of Wales and King Edward V of England (d. 1483?)

1478

- 3 February - Edward Stafford, 3rd Duke of Buckingham (executed 1521)

1485

- 16 December - Catherine of Aragon, later Princess of Wales (d. 1536)

1486

- 19 September - Arthur, Prince of Wales (d. 1502)

1491

- 28 June - Henry, Duke of York, later Prince of Wales and King Henry VIII of England (d. 1547)

== Deaths ==
1402

- date unknown - Hywel Sele, nobleman

1410

- 11 April - John Trevor, Bishop of St Asaph

1415

- 25 October - Dafydd Gam, soldier

1422

- 31 August - Henry V of England, former Prince of Wales, 34

1430

- date unknown - Adam of Usk, chronicler

1435

- 25 October - Philip Morgan, Bishop of Ely

1437

- 3 January - Catherine of Valois, widow of Henry V of England and secret wife of Owen Tudor, 35

1440

- 30 September - Reynold Grey, 3rd Baron Grey of Ruthin, about 78

1445

- date unknown - Sir William ap Thomas, builder of Raglan Castle

1446

- 21 October - William Lyndwood, Bishop of St David's

1456

- 3 November - Edmund Tudor, 1st Earl of Richmond, 26

1461

- 2 February - Owen Tudor, courtier, 60? (executed)
- probable - Reginald Pecock, Bishop of St Asaph

1467

- 21 November - John Low, Bishop of St Asaph

1469

- 27 July - William Herbert, Earl of Pembroke, 46? (executed)

1471

- May - Sir Roger Vaughan of Tretower (executed)

1483

- 25 June - Anthony Woodville, 2nd Earl Rivers, Governor of the Prince of Wales's Household, 43? (executed)

1484

- 9 April - Edward of Middleham, Prince of Wales, aged about 10
- date unknown - David ap Mathew, standard bearer of King Edward IV of England, 84

1485

- 16 March - Anne Neville, former Princess of Wales, 28

1492

- 20 September - George Nevill, 4th Baron Bergavenny, about 52

1493

- date unknown - Guto'r Glyn, bard and soldier, about 60

1496

- January/February - John Marshall, Bishop of Llandaff

1499

- c.November - John Ingleby, Bishop of Llandaff, about 65

1500

- 1 October - John Alcock, Tudor supporter and Lord President of the Council of Wales and the Marches
