= 14th century in Wales =

- 13th century | 15th century | Other years in Wales
- Other events of the century

This article is about the particular significance of the century 1301–1400 to Wales and its people.

== Events ==
1301

- 7 February – Edward, son and heir of King Edward I of England, is invested as Prince of Wales.

1302

- February – James of Saint George, architect of several major castles in Wales, is appointed to oversee to the new defences at Linlithgow in Scotland.
- 14 November – Elizabeth of Rhuddlan, daughter of King Edward I, marries the Marcher lord Humphrey de Bohun, 4th Earl of Hereford at Westminster Abbey.
- Sir John Wogan, Chancellor of St Davids and Lord Justiciar of Ireland, buys out the remaining Fitzgerald interests in Castlemorris and Priskilly and returned them to the Diocese of St Davids.

1303

- England's crown jewels, including the coronet of Llywelyn ap Gruffudd, are stolen from Westminster Abbey and subsequently re-housed in the Tower of London.
- Newborough, Anglesey, gains its town charter.

1304

- The remains of Bleddfa Castle are used to build a church tower.

1305

- Denbigh Castle is substantially completed; 183 settlers are recorded as living outside the town walls and only 52 inside the town's defences.

1306

- 26 May – Eleanor de Clare marries Hugh Despenser the Younger at Westminster.
- Work on Beaumaris Castle restarts, after a six-year gap, prompted by fears of a Scottish invasion of North Wales.

1307

- 1 November – Margaret de Clare marries Piers Gaveston.

1308

- 30 September – Elizabeth de Clare marries John de Burgh.

1310

- John Charleton, 1st Baron Cherleton, begins construction of Powis Castle.

1311

- Construction of Holt Castle is complete.

1314

- A revolt breaks out in Glamorgan.

1315

- January – Roger Mortimer de Chirk is removed from his office of Justiciar of North Wales.
- King Edward II of England, as guardian of the three heiresses of the estate of Gilbert de Clare, appoints Payn de Turberville of Coity as administrator.

1316

- 28 January – Llywelyn Bren, a nobleman of Glamorgan, leads a revolt, attacking Caerphilly Castle.
- 3 February – Widowed heiress Elizabeth de Clare is abducted from Bristol Castle by Theobald II de Verdun, whom she subsequently marries. A few months later, she is widowed for a second time.
- March – In a brief battle at Castell Mor Graig, Llywelyn Bren and his men are forced to break off their six-week siege of Caerphilly.
- 18 March – Llywelyn Bren surrenders unconditionally to Humphrey de Bohun, 4th Earl of Hereford.
- October – Roger Mortimer de Chirk is re-appointed Justiciar of North Wales in October 1316.

1317

- 15 November – Hugh Despenser the Younger becomes Lord of Glamorgan in the right of his wife Eleanor de Clare.

1318

- Llywelyn Bren is executed at Cardiff Castle.

1321

- February – Despenser War: Roger Mortimer, Humphrey de Bohun, 4th Earl of Hereford, and Thomas, 2nd Earl of Lancaster, agree to attack the Welsh lands of Hugh Despenser the Younger and his father Hugh le Despenser, 1st Earl of Winchester.
- March – Despenser War: King Edward II travels to Gloucester and calls on the Marcher Lords to join him; Mortimer and Hereford decline. Edward marches on to Bristol, and repeats his call for the Marcher Lords to convene with him there. They again decline.
- May – Despenser War: Newport, Cardiff and Caerphilly are seized by Roger Mortimer in an intense eight-day campaign. Mortimer and the Earl of Hereford then set about pillaging Glamorgan and Gloucestershire, before marching north to join Lancaster at Pontefract Castle.
- December – Despenser War: King Edward II of England and his allies march on Cirencester, preparing to invade the Welsh borders.

1322

- 22 January – Despenser War: Roger Mortimer and his uncle, Roger Mortimer de Chirk, surrender to King Edward II at Shrewsbury.

1323

- 20 June – John de Egglescliffe, Bishop of Connor, is translated to the diocese of Llandaff.

1326

- 9 October – King Edward II of England arrives in Gloucester; from here he flees into Wales.
- 21 October – King Edward II and his favourite, Hugh Despenser the Younger, take ship at Chepstow, heading west, but are forced to put into Cardiff after five days of adverse weather.
- 4 November – King Edward II takes refuge at Neath; the abbot attempts to negotiate on his behalf with the forces of Queen Isabella and Roger Mortimer.
- 16 November – King Edward II is captured by rebel forces at Pantybrad in South Wales. His favourite Hugh Despenser the Younger is also captured and imprisoned; ten days later he is tried and executed for treason. Hugh's wife, Eleanor de Clare, is placed in confinement in the Tower of London.

1327

- 25 January – King Edward II of England is forced to abdicate.
- 4 April – King Edward II, now a prisoner, is transferred to Llanthony Priory.

1328

- April – Eleanor de Clare is allowed to take possession of her own lands in Wales.
- 12 June – Henry Gower is consecrated as Bishop of St Davids.
- Approximate date – Quay built at Tenby.

1329

- February – Following her elopement with (or abduction by) William de la Zouche, Eleanor de Clare, is again imprisoned in the Tower of London.

1330

- 6 December – The British Isles are hit by a great storm, creating large areas of sand dunes on Anglesey.
- December – Eleanor de Clare, widow of Hugh Despenser the Younger, is given permission to bury her husband's remains on the family estate in Gloucestershire.

1339

- Farndon Bridge built across the Welsh border.

1343

- 12 May – Edward, the Black Prince, is invested as Prince of Wales.
- Llywelyn ap Gwilym, uncle of the poet Dafydd ap Gwilym, is appointed constable of Newcastle Emlyn.

1345

- First stone bridge at Llangollen built by John Trevor of Trevor Hall.

1346

- John Trevor becomes Bishop of St Asaph.

1347

- 3 June – John Paschal is designated Bishop of Llandaff, despite the election of another candidate by the chapter.
- 23 September – John of Thoresby is consecrated Bishop of St Davids.

1349

- Edward le Despencer, 1st Baron le Despencer, becomes Lord of Glamorgan.
- The Black Death arrives in Carmarthen. Eleven of the twelve gafol-men (castle tenants) are dead by 1350.

1361

- 10 October – Edward, the Black Prince, marries his cousin, Joan of Kent, who becomes Princess of Wales.

1369

- Owain Lawgoch launches an unsuccessful invasion attempt on Wales.

1372

- May – In Paris, Owain Lawgoch announces his intention of claiming the throne of Wales.
- Owain Lawgoch and his invasion force arrive in Guernsey.

1375

- 11 November – At the age of two, Thomas le Despenser succeeds his father as Lord of Glamorgan.

1376

- 20 November – Prince Richard, grandson of King Edward III, is invested as Prince of Wales.

1377

- Rumours spread of a third invasion attempt by Owain Lawgoch.

1384

- Owain Glyndŵr enters the army of King Richard II of England.

1386

- September – Owain Glyndŵr is a witness in the Scrope v. Grosvenor trial at Chester.

1389

- 9 August – Edmund Bromfeld, formerly a troublesome monk at Bury St Edmunds Abbey, is designated Bishop of Llandaff by the Pope.

1397

- 11 November – Guy Mone is consecrated Bishop of St Davids.

1399

- 24 July – Richard II of England lands from Ireland and makes his way to Conwy Castle.
- 9 August – Holt Castle surrenders without a fight to the soon-to-be Henry IV of England and the royal treasure moved here from the Tower of London over the previous year by Richard is recovered.
- 12 August – Richard negotiates with Henry Percy, 1st Earl of Northumberland, at Conwy.
- 19 August – Richard surrenders to Bolingbroke at Flint Castle
- 15 October – Henry of Monmouth is invested as Prince of Wales. In the same month Harry Hotspur is appointed Justiciar of North Wales and Chester, Sheriff of Flint, and Keeper of five royal castles in North Wales.

1400

- 16 September – Owain Glyndŵr is declared Prince of Wales by his followers at Glyndyfrdwy. Start of the Glyndŵr Rising.
- 26 September – King Henry IV of England arrives in Shrewsbury with an army to put down the rebellion.
- November – An affray occurs at Westminster between the followers of Adam of Usk and those of his enemy Walter Jakes.

== Births ==
1330

- 15 June – Edward, the Black Prince, Prince of Wales (d. 1376)

1341

- date unknown – Sir John Clanvowe, diplomat, soldier and poet (d. 1391)
- probable – Llywelyn ap Gruffydd Fychan, Carmarthenshire landowner and rebel (d. 1401)

1374

- 11 April – Roger Mortimer, 4th Earl of March, Marcher Lord and heir presumptive to Richard II
- probable – Constance of York, Countess of Gloucester, descendant of Llywelyn Fawr (d. 1416)

1376

- 9 November – Edmund Mortimer, claimant to the English throne and son-in-law of Owain Glyndŵr (d. c.1409)

1391

- 6 November – Edmund Mortimer, 5th Earl of March, claimant to the English throne and nephew of Edmund Mortimer (d. 1425)

== Deaths ==
1304

- 17 July – Edmund Mortimer, 2nd Baron Wigmore, Marcher lord, 53
- date unknown – Madog Crypl, lord of Powys Fadog

1311

- 11 October – Tudur Hen, grandson of Ednyfed Fychan and ancestor of the Tudor dynasty

1314

- 24 June (Battle of Bannockburn) - Gilbert de Clare, 8th Earl of Gloucester, Marcher lord, 23

1315

- probable – Rhodri ap Gruffudd, grandson of Llywelyn Fawr

1326

- 3 August – Roger Mortimer de Chirk, 70?
- 27 October – Hugh le Despenser, 1st Earl of Winchester (executed), 65
- 24 November – Hugh Despenser the Younger, Lord of Glamorgan, 39/40 (executed)

1327

- 11 October (probable) - King Edward II of England, 43

1330

- 29 November – Roger Mortimer, 1st Earl of March, 43 (executed)

1337

- 7 June – Gwenllian, only child of Llywelyn ap Gruffudd, 54
- 30 June – Eleanor de Clare, heiress, 44

1342

- April – Margaret de Clare, heiress, 48

1347

- date unknown – John de Egglescliffe, Bishop of Llandaff

1349

- 29 September – Margaret Wake, 3rd Baroness Wake of Liddell, direct descendant of Llywelyn the Great and mother of the Princess of Wales, ?52

1352

- 26 December – John, 3rd Earl of Kent and Baron Wake, brother of the Princess of Wales, 22

1356

- Joan de Geneville, 2nd Baroness Geneville, widow of Roger Mortimer, 70

1360

- 26 February – Roger Mortimer, 2nd Earl of March, Marcher lord
- 4 November – Elizabeth de Clare, heiress, 65
- 26 December – Thomas Holland, 1st Earl of Kent, first husband of Joan of Kent

1370 1363

- date unknown – Tomas ap Rhodri, grandson of Llywelyn the Great and father of Owain Lawgoch
- probable – Dafydd ap Gwilym, poet

1372

- date unknown – Edward of Angoulême, elder son of the Prince and Princess of Wales, 6

1373

- 16 January – Humphrey de Bohun, 7th Earl of Hereford, Marcher lord, 30

1376

- 8 June – Edward, the Black Prince, Prince of Wales, 45

1378

- July – Owain Lawgoch, claimant to the principality of Wales (assassinated), ?48

1381

- probable – Sir Hywel ap Gruffydd ("Syr Hywel y Fwyall"), soldier in the service of King Edward III of England

1383

- 16 January – Thomas Rushhook becomes Bishop of Llandaff.

1385

- 7 August – Joan of Kent, Dowager Princess of Wales, 56

1387

- date unknown – Sir David Hanmer, judge

1390

- date unknown – Nicholas Carew, Lord Privy Seal

1394

- 4 June – Mary de Bohun, mother of the future King Henry V

1398

- 20 July – Roger Mortimer, 4th Earl of March, Marcher lord, 24
- date unknown – Iolo Goch, bard

1400

- 14 February – King Richard II of England, formerly Prince of Wales (1376–77), 33
