= Lleision ap Thomas =

Welsh cleric

Abbot of Neath
- In office c. 1510 – 9 February 1539
- Succeeded by: none

Personal details
- Died: c. 1541
- Occupation: Cleric

Lleision ap Thomas or Llyson Thomas etc. (Note: His name is variously spelled Llyson, Leisan, Lesan, Leyshon, Leyson, Lleison, Llysan, and sometimes Thomas Llyson rather than Llyson Thomas.) (died c. 1541) was the last abbot of Neath in West Glamorgan, Wales. He was one of the most influential Cistercians in Wales in the period before the Dissolution of the Monasteries.

== Abbot of Neath ==
Lleision ap Thomas succeeded John ap Hywel (Hoell), who is mentioned as Abbot of Neath in 1507. Lleision is mentioned as abbot on 28 January 1510. He studied at the University of Oxford and obtained the degrees of B.Can.L. in 1511 and B.D. in 1512. In 1513 Lleision was appointed to a commission of the peace that met at Cardiff. He was named Reformator of the Cistercian Order for Wales, and was noted for his zealous activity. In 1517 he was named a definitor for the family of Clairvaux, and in 1518 became a definitor for the lineage of Cîteaux. He visited Paris in 1521 in connection with work for the Order.

In 1532 King Henry VIII of England appointed Lleision to replace the Abbot of Chaâlis as one of five abbots on a visitation of England and Wales. In 1532 he was said to hold the leading position in public life of Gower, and played a major role in handling disputes between the English and Welsh portions of this district. He was also charged that year with restoring the college of Saint Bernard in Oxford. Llyson, Abbot of Nethe, Lewis, Abbot of Morgo, and others were named in a commission of the peace on 24 February 1536.

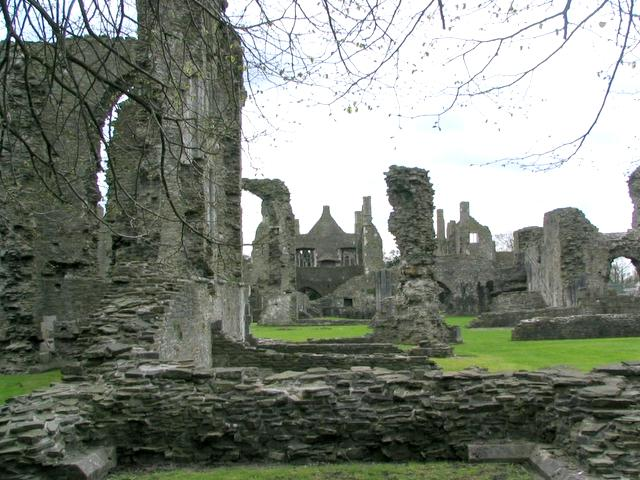
Ruins of Neath Abbey

== Later life ==
Neath abbey had an income of only £132 annually at the time of the Dissolution of the Monasteries and therefore should have been covered by the Act of Suppression in 1536, which applied to the lesser monasteries. The abbey obtained a stay of this decision in exchange for payment of a fine of £150. However, on 9 February 1539 Lleision had to resign and to cede all the possessions of the abbey to the king. In response to an appeal to Thomas Cromwell by the Crown deputy, Sir John Prise, he was given a rectory and a pension of £48. His rectory of Llangatwg-iuxta-Nedd (Llangattock-juxta-Neath) was situated beside his former monastery. There are no records of Lleision after 1541.

Lleision ap Thomas was the most influential of the late medieval Cistercian abbots in Wales. According to Lewys Morgannwg he was pious and learned, and Neath Abbey was a bastion of the Welsh language and culture. In 1539 one of the Crown Visitors said "He had ever lived worshipfully and well."

== Sources ==
- Bielch, Walter de Gray (1897), A history of Margam Abbey : derived from the original documents in the British Museum, H.M. Record Office, the Margam muniments, etc, London: British Museum
- Foot, Sarah (2011), "Cistercian Abbeys: NEATH", Cistercians in Yorkshire Project
- Knowles, David; Smith, David M.; Brooke, Christopher Nugent Lawrence (13 March 2008), The Heads of Religious Houses: England and Wales, III. 1377-1540, Cambridge University Press, ISBN 978-0-521-86508-1
- Saunders, Evan John (1959), "Lleision ap Thomas", Dictionary of Welsh Biography, National Library of Wales
- Williams, David Henry (2001), The Welsh Cistercians: Written to Commemorate the Centenary of the Death of Stephen William Williams (1837-1899) (The Father of Cistercian Archaeology in Wales), Gracewing Publishing, ISBN 978-0-85244-354-5
