= Alphabet book =

Children's book designed to teach the letters of the alphabet

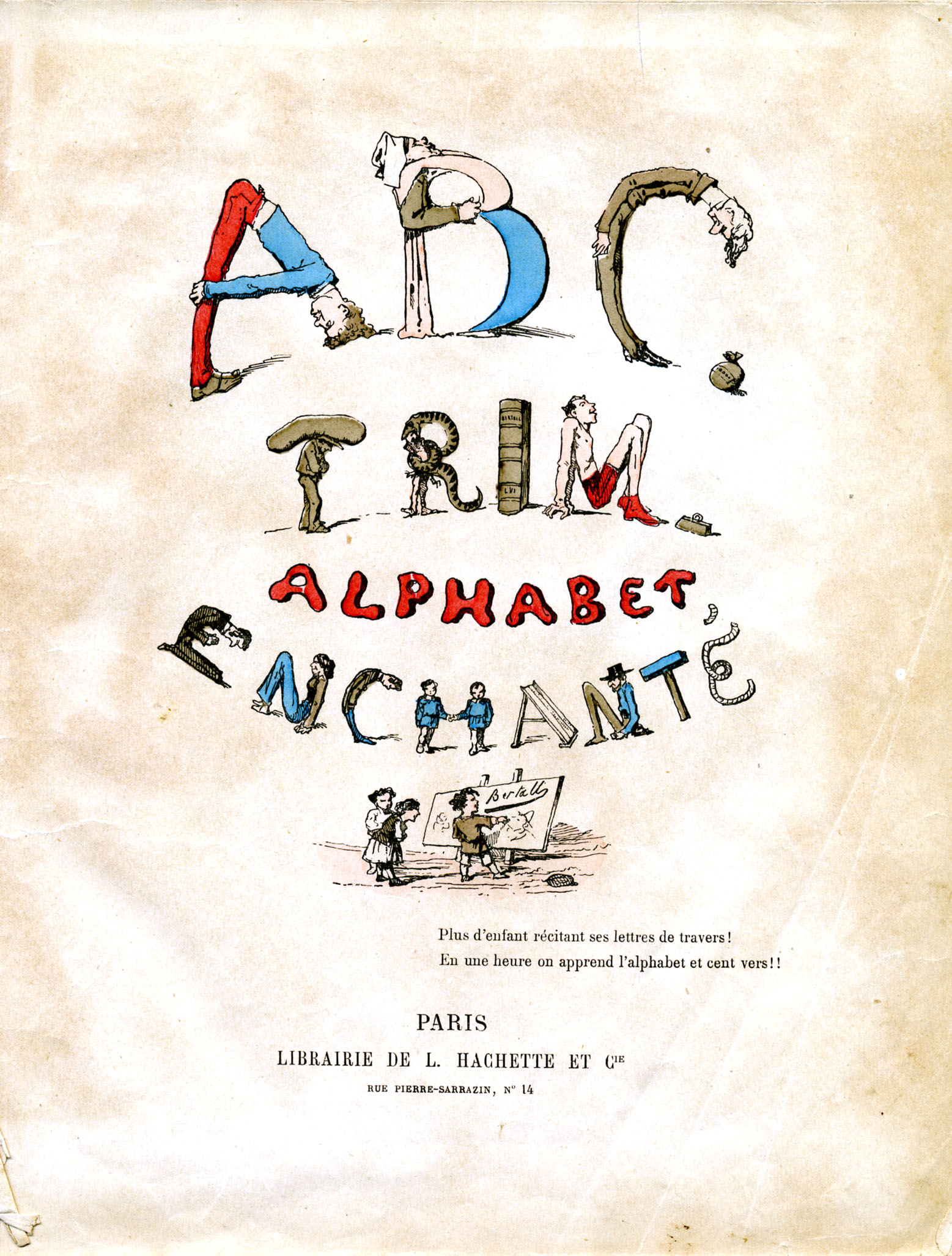
A French alphabet book printed in 1861

An alphabet book is a type of children's book giving basic instruction in an alphabet. Intended for young children, alphabet books commonly use pictures, simple language and alliteration to aid language learning. Alphabet books are published in several languages, and some distinguish the capitals and lower case letters in a given alphabet.

Some alphabet books are intended for older audiences, using the simplicity of the genre as a device to convey humor or other concepts.

== Purposes ==
Alphabet books introduce the sounds and letters of an ordered alphabet. As elementary educational tools, Alphabet books provide opportunities for:

1. Developing conversations and proficiency in oral language
2. Providing alphabet path of motion lessons
3. Increasing phonemic awareness
4. Teaching phonics
5. Making text connections (Activating prior knowledge)
6. Predicting (Text talk)
7. Building vocabulary
8. Inferencing / drawing conclusions
9. Sequencing
10. Identifying elements of story structure
11. Recognizing point of view
12. Visualizing setting (Time, place and atmosphere)
13. Performing Dialogue (Plays and Readers' Theater)
14. Rereading for fluency
15. Retelling for comprehension checks
16. Engaging Multiple Intelligences through writing, music, art, Dance

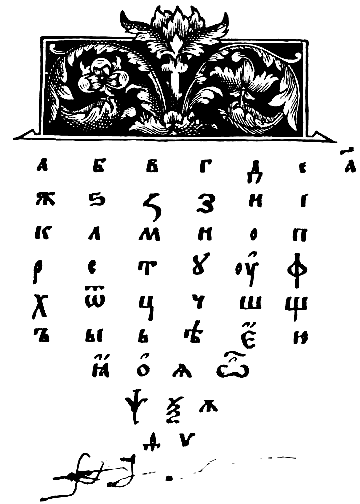
A page from Azbuka (Alphabet book, 1574), the first East Slavic textbook. Printed by Ivan Fyodorov in Lviv, in the Polish–Lithuanian Commonwealth. This page features Cyrillic.

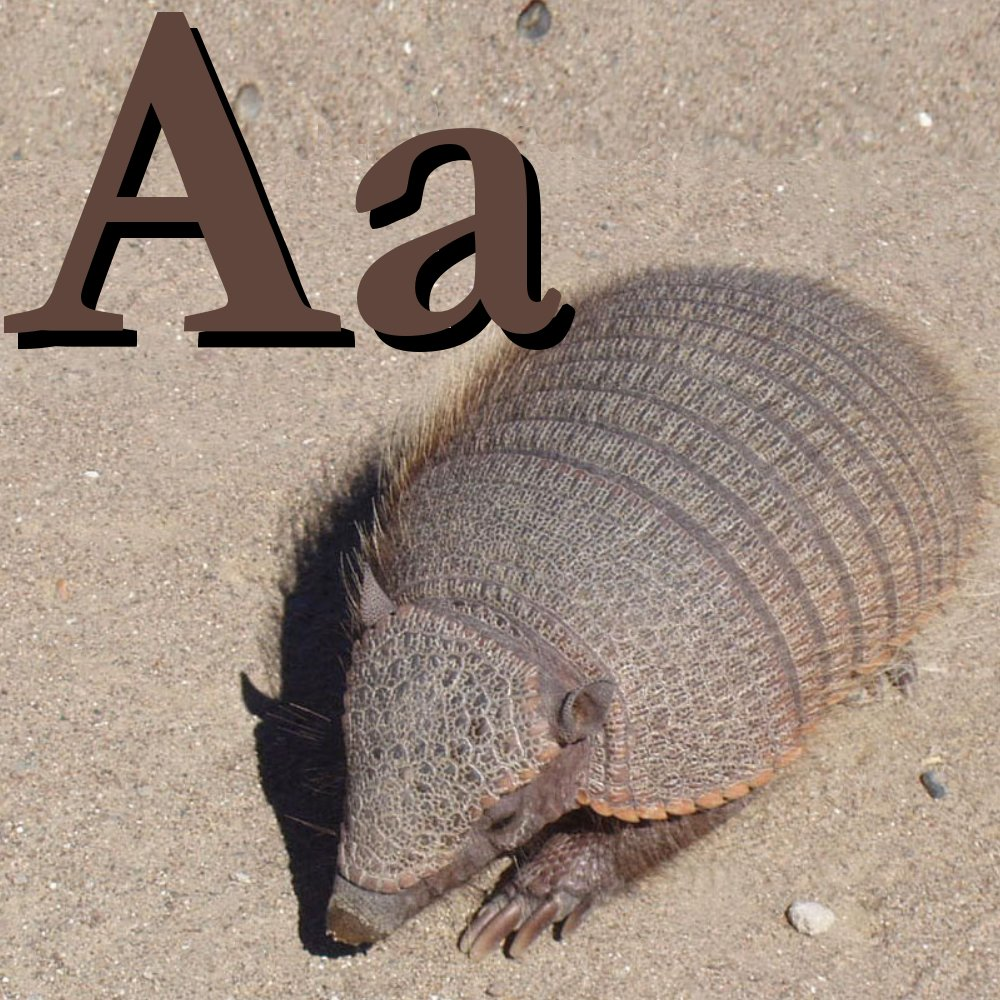
A page from an alphabet book, showing the letter a and an armadillo

== History ==
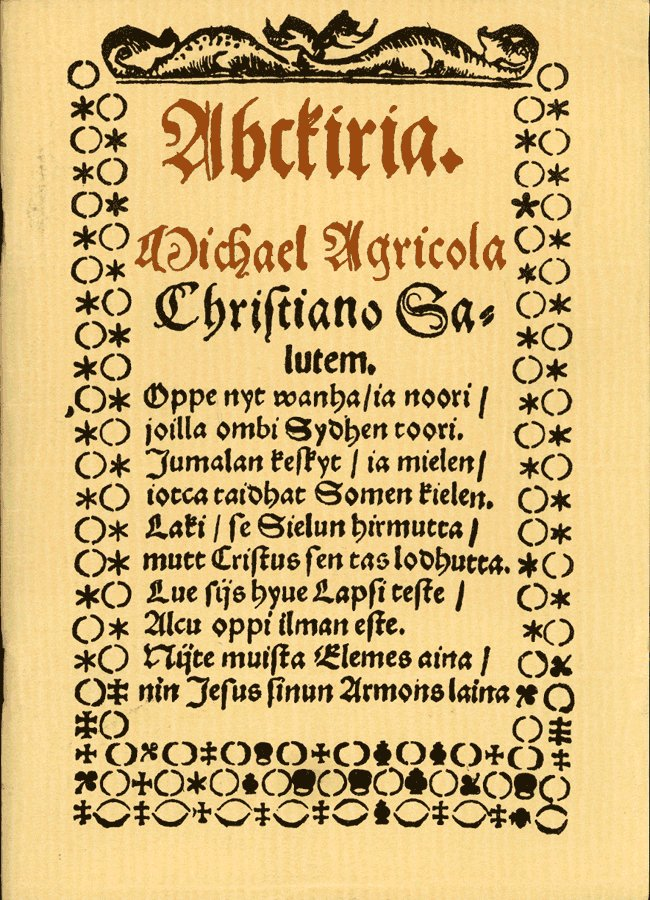
The first page of Abckiria, written by Mikael Agricola in 1543.

The oldest alphabet book known is Thomas Petyt's The BAC Bothe in Latyn and in Englysshe (1538). The first alphabet book to be accompanied by pictures is John Hart's A Methode; or, Comfortable Beginning for All Unlearned (1570). In Britain during the early English Reformation through the reign of Elizabeth I, these books were closely associated with and occasionally overlapped with primer prayer books. One such instance was the 1546 Yny lhyvyr hwnn, the first book printed in Welsh.

=== Hornbooks ===
The hornbook, a form of ABC book, was common by Shakespeare's day. It consisted of a piece of parchment or paper pasted on a wooden board and protected by a leaf of horn. Hornbooks displayed letters of the alphabet, a syllabary and prayers for novice readers. Andrew Tuer described a typical hornbook with a line separating the lower case and capital letters from the syllabary. This syllabarium or syllabary, likely added to the hornbook in 1596, taught pronunciations of vowel and consonant combinations.

ab eb ib ob ub ba be bi bo bu

These syllables are possible ancestors to the modern instructional practice of new readers working with onsets and rimes in word families. From the first hornbook, the alphabet format cemented the learning progression from syllables to words.

An example of the reliance on the alphabet for reading instruction is found in John Bunyan's, A Book for Boys and Girls, or Country Rhymes for Children.

To those who are in years but Babes I bow
My Pen to teach them what the Letters be,
And how they may improve their A. B. C.
Nor let my pretty Children them despise.
All needs must there begin, that would be wise,
Nor let them fall under Discouragement,
Who at their hornbook stick, and time hath spent,
Upon that A. B. C., while others do
Into their primer or their Psalter go.

As referenced in this verse, it was an expectation of the period that "babes" began as readers with knowledge of the alphabet. Armed with the letters of the alphabet from the hornbook, children encountered other early forms of reading materials.

The child's alphabet book is considered one of the oldest literary genres of American literature.

=== Battledores ===
The battledore was an instrument like a small racket, used for playing badminton. The term was applied to the wooden or cardboard tablets, which gradually replaced the hornbook as a device for teaching children to read. The wording printed on them varied greatly, but usually featured an alphabet, and, unlike the hornbook, entertainment was provided as well as instruction in the form of illustrations. They first appeared in the 1750s and were produced until the middle of the nineteenth century. The battledore was a more complex type of horn book printed on thick paper folded in three parts containing enlarged text with word to object illustrations for each of the capital letters bordering the four sides. The letter-word associations provide insight into eighteenth century religious and sociocultural priorities.

A is represented by an image of an Angel
J Judge
K King
M Mitre (religious headwear)
Q Queen
T Turk
X Xerxes
Z Zeal (kneeling figure with open prayer book)

Tuer's Royal Battledore illustrated the lower case alphabet letters with a for Apple; j, k, q, and x for Judge, King, Queen and Xerxes; m for Mouse and z for Zany jester. In fact, some battledores' upper and lower borders contained this rhyme:

He that ne'er learns his ABC,
For ever will a Blockhead be.
But he that learns these Letters fair,
Shall have a Coach to take the Air.

There is evidence of a gradual shift to more secular topics for general reading instruction from predominantly religious material.

=== Primers and spellers ===
Experienced with both hornbooks and battledores, children graduated on to the modern concept of a small book, multiple paper pages covered with a thick, protective layer. Early reading booklets or religious primers contained both the alphabet and increasingly complicated lists of alphabetized syllables along with selected excerpts from the Bible. From tablet to booklet, the ABC format served as the most common framework for additional reading materials. The first church primers paralleled the introduction of school textbooks known as "the ABC". Both colonial primers and ABC spellers employed the alphabet as an organizational feature for literacy instruction and spiritual study.

Originally imported from England, children's reading textbooks aligned with the educational emphasis on the alphabet. While students were first trained to recite the alphabet, moralistic readings were framed around the letters of the alphabet. During the American colonial period the more secular "ABC" spellers quickly fell out of favor in comparison with the more religious primers; nevertheless, the alphabet remained the most systematic means of ordering the written contents of schoolbooks.

==== The New England Primer ====
Dating back to 1683, the New England Primer contained rhyming couplets for each letter of the alphabet. These patterned rhymes were often supported by gloomy woodcut illustrations. The content of these paired lines varied from overwhelmingly religious to somewhat secular depending upon the particular version of the New England Primer.

The standard Primer beginning 'In Adam's fall, we sinned all' remained consistent throughout the numerous published texts; however, rhymes were occasionally edited for religious or political purposes, as demonstrated by the 1729 edition of the New England Primer. The passage, 'our KING the good, No man of blood' illustrated the letter K Due to the conflict with the English monarchy, The K couplet was altered and appeared in the revised 1777 edition as 'Proud Korah's troop, was swallowed up.' Similarly, in the same 1777 version, 'The dog will bite, a thief at night' was replaced by a Biblical reference. 'The deluge drowned the earth around' was inserted for 'the watchful dog'. Referring to mortal sin, the original U for 'Uriah's beauteous wife made David seek his life' was censored by omitting U and skipping to V. The alphabet letters were used to teach the moral code aspired by society and religion.

In the New England Primer, the couplets were followed by alphabetized Biblical sentences; the "Alphabet of Lessons for Youth" was designed for further reading practice and lifelong moral instruction. Both the 1777 and 1843 editions of the Primer maintained the same sentence excerpts from the Bible. The following are a few examples highlighting letters A, D, K and U:

A Wise son maketh a glad father, but a foolish son is the heaviness of his mother.
DO not the abominable thing which I hate saith the Lord.
KEEP thy heart with all diligence, for out of it are the issues of life.
UPON the wicked, God shall rain an horrible tempest.

Clearly, the immensely popular New England Primer continued to influence educational practice even beyond the revolutionary period. Of parallel longevity, the battledore continued to be published well into the 18th century. Believed to be the inventor of battledores in 1746, Benjamin Collins actually printed 100,000 copies between 1771 and 1780

=== Versions of The Child's New Plaything ===
Exemplifying the move away from strictly religious texts to more moral works, an outstanding example of the next generation of readers was the 1742 version of The Child's New Plaything. Sensitive to a youthful audience, the anonymous author introduced the alphabet with a lettered story about an appetizing apple pie.

A Apple-Pye.
B bit it.
C cut it.
D divided it.
E eat it.
F fought for it.
G got it.
H had it.
I it'd it.
J join'd for't.
K kept it.
L long'd for't.
M mourn'd for't.
N nodded at it.
O open'd it.
P peep'd in't.
Q quarter'd it.
R run for't.
S snatch'd it.
T turn'd it.
U use'd it.
V view'd it.
W what'd it.
X excite'd it.
Y you'd it.
Z zone it.

& I wish I had a Piece of it now in my Hand.

Later versions of the rhyme, now known as the Apple Pie ABC, became more elaborate and diversified.

In addition, The Child's New Plaything contained the alphabet story, A was an Archer, which was also to go through many later editions.

== Present ==
Alphabet books can make use of alliteration, onomatopoeia, creative narrative, poetry, illusions, treasure hunts and humor to hold a reader's interest. Electronic alphabet books are now on the market, with various animations and audio features. However, some educators have criticised alphabet books for focusing on teaching the names of the letters, which often sound different from the sounds they produce, as interfering with the process of learning to read.

== See also ==
- Runa ABC - Swedish alphabet book with runes, first published in 1611
- Abckiria - Finnish alphabet book
- Abecedar - Macedonian alphabet book
- Abetare - Albanian alphabet book
- Primer (textbook)
- Hornbook
- Animalia (book) - Alliterative animal alphabet
- Dr. Seuss
- Basal reader
- The Gashlycrumb Tinies - American alphabet book depicting the deaths of 26 children.
