= Apple Pie ABC =

English alphabet rhyme for children

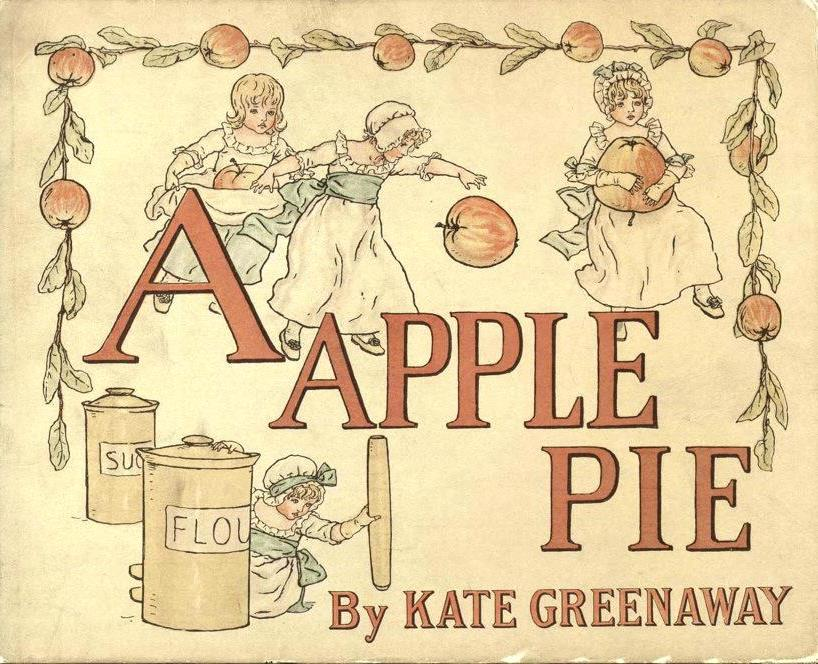
The title page of Kate Greenaway’s version of the alphabet, 1886

"Apple Pie ABC" is an old and enduring English alphabet rhyme for children which has gone through several variations since the 17th century. Its educational function is to describe the interaction of children with the pie in alphabetical order, placing it at the very start of The Oxford Dictionary of Nursery Rhymes.

== History ==
"Apple Pie ABC" is a simple rhyme meant to teach children the order of the alphabet and relates the various ways children react to an apple pie. After the first line, A was an apple pie, the rest of the letters refer to verbs. The earliest printed versions, dating from the 18th century, have the following form: "A was an Apple pie; B bit it; C cut it; D dealt it; E eat it; F fought for it; G got it; H had it; J joined it; K kept it; L longed for it; M mourned for it; N nodded at it; O opened it; P peeped in it; Q quartered it; R ran for it; S stole it; T took it; V viewed it; W wanted it; X, Y, Z, and &, All wished for a piece in hand". At that time the writing of the capital letters I and J, and of U and V, was not differentiated, which explains the absence of the two vowels. Later versions added I and U with, "I inspected it" and "U upset it".

The earliest mention of the rhyme was in a religious work dated 1671, but covered only the letters A-G. It first appeared in printed form in Child’s New Plaything: being a spelling-book intended to make the learning to read a diversion instead of a task (London 1742, Boston 1750), followed soon after by Tom Thumb's Playbook to teach children their letters as soon as they can speak, being a new and pleasant method to allure little ones in the first principles of learning (London 1747; Boston 1764). The latter was reprinted eight times in the U.S. by the end of the century. But by then much the same rhyme was appearing under the macabre title The Tragical Death of A, Apple Pye Who was Cut in Pieces and Eat by Twenty-Five Gentlemen with whom All Little People Ought to be Very well acquainted (London 1770; Worcester, Mass. 1787) - also many times reprinted in both countries.

It has been speculated that the phrase 'in apple pie order' refers to the regular progression of this alphabet rhyme.

== Variations ==
Variations in wording began to appear with the start of the 19th century. The History of the APPLE PIE, an Alphabet for little Masters and Misses, ‘written by Z’ (London 1808), has "B bit it, C cried for it, D danced for it, E eyed it, F fiddled for it, G gobbled it, H hid it, I inspected it, J jumped over it, K kicked it, L laughed at it, M mourned for it, N nodded for it, O opened it, P peeped into it, Q quaked for it, R rode for it, S skipped for it, T took it, U upset it, V viewed it, W warbled for it, X Xerxes drew his sword for it, Y yawned for it, Z zealous that all good boys and girls should be acquainted with his family, sat down and wrote the history of it". There are two American versions in the Beinecke Rare Book & Manuscript Library; a slightly different English version from 1835 is archived in the Open Library The most popular illustrated later edition of the rhyme was Kate Greenaway’s A Apple Pie: An Old-Fashioned Alphabet Book (London, 1886), which has been continuously reprinted up to the present. In place of the plaintive yearning for a piece of the pie with which the original version ends, she substitutes the more fulfilled "UVWXYZ all had a large slice and went off to bed", so allowing herself to get away with only twenty illustrations.

The rhyme also began to be changed in other ways, as in The Real History of the Apple Pie, which has an extended coda:

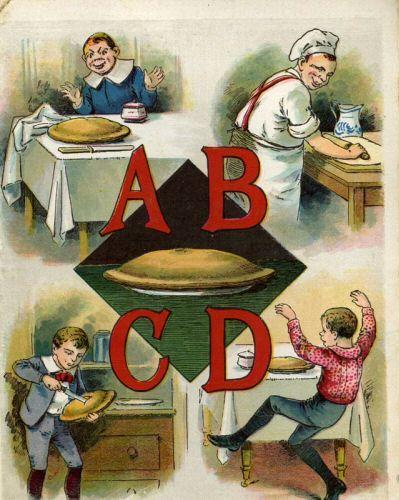
A page from the McLoughlin Brothers' Apple Pie ABC, 1888

Says A, give me a good large slice,
Says B, a little bit, but nice,
Says C, cut me a piece of crust, Take it, says D, it's dry as dust,
Says E, I’ll eat it fast, I will, Says F, I vow I'll have my fill,
Says G, give it me good and great, Says H, a little bit I hate,
Says I, it's ice I must request, Says J, the juice I love the best,
Says K, let's keep it up above, Says L, the border's what I love,
Says M, it makes your teeth to chatter, N said, it's nice, there's nought the matter,
O others' plates with grief surveyed, P for a large piece begged and prayed,
Q quarrelled for the topmost slice, R rubbed his hands and said "it's nice,"
S silent sat, and simply looked, T thought, and said, it's nicely cooked,
U understood the fruit was cherry, V vanished when they all got merry,
W wished there'd been a quince in, X here explained he'd need convincing,
Y said, I'll eat, and yield to none, Z, like a zany, said he'd done,
While & purloined the dish, And for another pie did wish.

Eventually completely original works were created that took their beginning from the rhyme. In 1871 Edward Lear made fun of it in his nonsense parody "A was once an apple pie", which soon diverged into nursery language and then treated other subjects for the rest of the alphabet. The illustrations in McLoughlin Brothers' linen-mounted Apple Pie ABC (New York, 1888) appear to be largely dependent on the original work but the verses are different:

E stands for Ellen who sat at the table
And tried to eat more than she really was able.
F had a fight with his sisters and brothers,
Declaring he would not divide with the others.

In 1899, however, the firm printed the original rhyme under the title ABC of the Apple Pie. Meanwhile, Raphael Tuck and Sons were publishing their own linen-mounted Father Tuck’s Apple Pie ABC (London, 1899) which, once more, features a completely different rhyme:

E stands for eat; wait till it’s cooled from the heat.
F stands for fruit – best of all, apples sweet.

Despite the popularity of revised and new versions during the 19th century, the original rhyme did not drop out of circulation. Kate Greenaway's late Victorian A, Apple Pie was largely based on the old rhyme, as were some 20th-century examples. The accompanying illustrations, however, have now moved their focus from using children as protagonists to a more fanciful approach this century, ranging from the whimsical beasts of Étienne Delessert (Aa was an Apple Pie, Mankato, Minn. 2005) to the animated alphabet of England's Luke Farookhi.

== Literary allusions ==
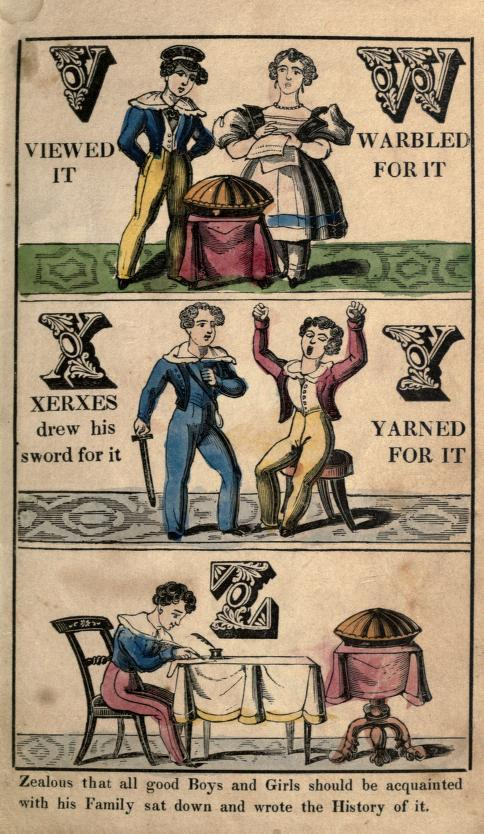
The Z version, published in London, 1835

The nursery rhyme seems to have appealed particularly to the English writer Charles Dickens, who mentions it in three works. The first mention is within an essay on "A Christmas Tree" (1850), on which the illustrated nursery books so popular at the time are hung. "Thin books, in themselves, at first, but many of them, and with deliciously smooth covers of bright red or green. What fat black letters to begin with! 'A was an archer, and shot at a frog.' Of course he was. He was an apple-pie also, and there he is! He was a good many things in his time, was A, and so were most of his friends, except X, who had so little versatility, that I never knew him to get beyond Xerxes or Xantippe."

His novel Bleak House (1852) introduces an allusion into a description of legal process in the Court of Chancery: "Equity sends questions to law, law sends questions back to equity; law finds it can't do this, equity finds it can't do that; neither can so much as say it can't do anything, without this solicitor instructing and this counsel appearing for A, and that solicitor instructing and that counsel appearing for B; and so on through the whole alphabet, like the history of the apple pie."

Finally there is his story of "The Italian Prisoner" (1860), which details the difficulties of transporting an enormous bottle of wine through Italy. "The suspicions that attached to this innocent Bottle greatly aggravated my difficulties. It was like the apple-pie in the child's book. Parma pouted at it, Modena mocked it, Tuscany tackled it, Naples nibbled it, Rome refused it, Austria accused it, Soldiers suspected it, Jesuits jobbed it."

The reference to Xerxes in the first of these quotations, and to "the history of the apple pie" in the second, suggests that it is the "Z" version with which Dickens is acquainted.
