= Gruffydd Robert =

Welsh Catholic priest and humanist scholar

Gruffydd Robert (1527–98) was a Welsh Catholic priest and humanist scholar who in 1567 wrote a pioneering Welsh grammar while in exile in Italy with his uncle and fellow-writer Morys Clynnog.

== Life ==
Gruffydd Robert was born in Caernarfonshire (Gwynedd) to parents named in the sources as Robert and Catrin ferch Gruffudd. He was awarded an MA degree from Christ Church, Oxford in 1555 before taking office as archdeacon of Anglesey in 1558. Shortly after his appointment Mary I died and Protestantism was reaffirmed as the established religion of England and Wales with the Acts of Supremacy and Uniformity (1558) following the accession of Elizabeth I. Catholicism remained strong in Wales, and Gruffydd was among those who remained faithful to the old religion.

Gruffydd Robert and Morys Clynnog chose to leave Wales for the continent after Elizabeth became Queen. By January 1563 they were in Rome, where Gruffydd was ordained priest. Both he and Morys Clynnog became chaplains to the English Hospice (which in 1579 would become the English College) in that city.

By 1567, when the first part of his grammar was published, Gruffydd Robert was in Milan, in the service of Archbishop Cardinal Borromeo. Gruffydd was referred to as doctor by Anthony Munday and Morris Kyffin; he may have received a doctorate at Louvain, Belgium or perhaps during his time in Milan. Gruffydd was confessor to Borromeo and canon theologian to the Duomo (Milan Cathedral). During the plague of 1576-7 he was noted for his courage and assiduousness in caring for the sick. He remained in Milan in the service of Carlo Borromeo and his successors, Gaspare Visconti and Federico Borromeo.

In 1582 Gruffydd Robert requested retirement from publicly preaching in the cathedral of Milan; there being no other position vacant, he received a diocesan pension. After Borromeo's death in November 1584 he would have had more time to work on his grammar. Gruffydd died on 15 May 1598 in the Archbishop's Palace in Milan.

== His Grammar ==
The first part of Gruffydd Robert's groundbreaking grammar of Welsh was published as Dosbarth Byrr ar y rhann gyntaf i ramadeg Cymraeg ('A brief analysis of the first part of a Welsh Grammar') in Milan on Saint David's Day in 1567, probably at the press of Vincenzo Girardoni. The second, third and fourth parts are likely to have appeared post 1584. All of these are presented in the form of a dialogue between Gruffydd and Morys Clynnog, described as having taken place in a vineyard (possibly at Monti di Creta in Rome, which belonged to the Hospice). Clynnog himself is reported as having drowned c. 1582; St. Carlo Borromeo, who is referred to as Gruffydd's master or lord in the grammar, also died in 1584. The fourth part of the grammar discusses cynghanedd and the 24 strict metres of Welsh poetry. Also included with the grammar were the first published collection of Welsh poems and what remains of Gruffydd's literary translation of the Cato Maior de Senectute by Cicero.

== Bibliography ==
- T. Gwynfor Griffith, 'Italian Humanism and Welsh Prose' in Yorkshire Celtic Studies (vol. vi, 1953–58).
- D. Rhys Phillips, Dr. Griffith Robert, Canon of Milan (1922).
- G. J. Williams (ed.), Gramadeg Gruffydd Robert (University of Wales Press, Cardiff, 1939). This remains the standard edition of Gruffydd Robert's grammar, with an extensive introduction.
- M. P. Bryant-Quinn, 'Dyddiadau a Chefndir Gruffydd Robert, Milan: Gwybodaeth Newydd', Welsh History Review/Cylchgrawn Hanes Cymru, 29/4 (2019), 532–61.
