= Primer (prayer book) =

Christian prayer book

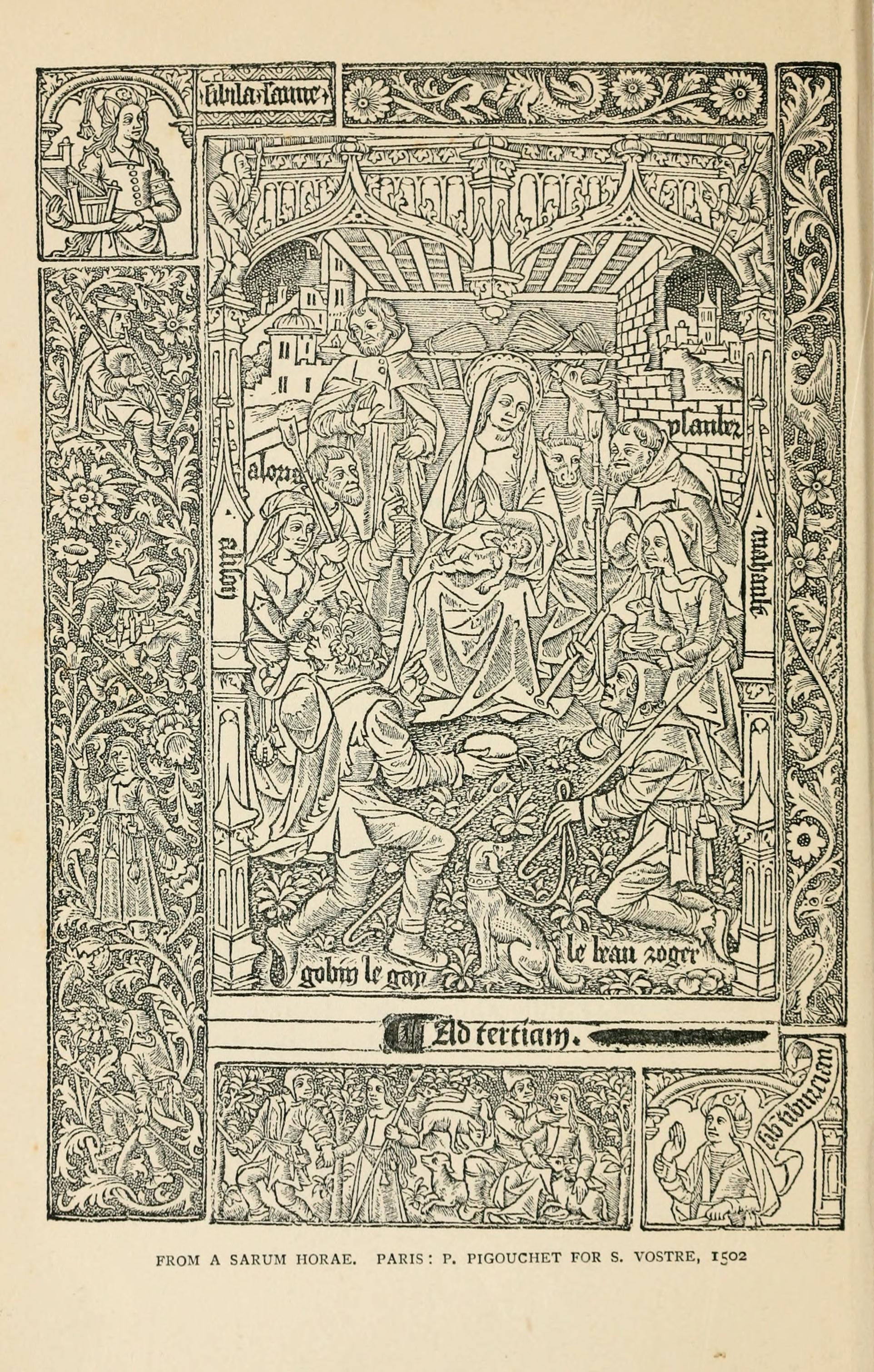
A 1902 reproduction of an illustration from a 1502 Parisian Sarum primer

Primer (Latin: primarium; Middle English: primmer, also spelled prymer) is the name for a variety of devotional prayer books that originated among educated medieval laity in the 14th century, particularly in England. While the contents of primers have varied dependent on edition, they often contained portions of the Psalms and Latin liturgical practices such as the Little Office of the Blessed Virgin Mary. Medieval primers were often similar to and sometimes considered synonymous with the also popular book of hours (Latin: horae); typically, a medieval horae was referred to as a primer in Middle English.

Primers remained popular during and immediately after the English Reformation among Protestants in the Church of England, where it developed into an Anglican and humanist educational tool for schoolchildren. Catholic editions were occasionally produced up to the 20th century, though in limited numbers. Over the succeeding centuries, their popularity as Christian texts waned as the word primer came to be associated with secular introductory textbooks.

== Origins ==
While the etymology of the word "primer" in reference to a type of prayer book is unknown, primers originated in texts produced for laity in the 14th century that developed out of and in correspondence with editions of the breviary and the related portiforium. Liturgical historian Edmund Bishop forwarded the view that the contents of these primers were pious devotional developments from the Divine Office according monastic use that were gradually viewed as obligatory within those communities. However, it is likely that the distinction between these devotions and the Divine Office were maintained and understood by those employing them. The earliest of these accretions were the Seven Penitential Psalms and the Fifteen Psalms. Further additions came with the 10th-century ascendancy of the Little Office of the Blessed Virgin Mary.

Laity in Western Christendom would attend recitation of the Divine Office, with women noted to have said the prayers in a low voice. However, the time needed to thoroughly learn the intricacies of the breviaries proved prohibitive to laypersons. Those devotions which were mostly invariable were adapted into primers. The introduction of the Office of the Dead and its variants of Matins and Vespers would, alongside the Little Office, form the basis of primers for several centuries. Historians differ in what constituted a medieval primer vis-à-vis an horae or book of hours: Alan Jacobs described the primary distinction between the texts being that, in the Middle Ages, books known as primers were in English and those known as horae were in Latin; Charity Scott-Stokes described the former as the Middle English term for the horae and Geoffrey Cuming treated them as synonymous in pre-Reformation England regardless of which language they were written in. Editions of the primers would match the local liturgical use in their ordering of the Psalms, with known variations for the Roman Rite, Sarum Use, York Use, and Parisian practices. Standardization of these devotions and the early primers would generally occur within monastic communities and cathedral and collegiate chapters.

The 14th century saw the primer become a valued devotional text among the laity, a value modern historians have understood through its regular inclusion in wills from 1323 onward. During the late Middle Ages, manuscript and later printed primers became the primary devotional literature of the English laity. The first printed primer was published in Latin in 1494 and contained additional devotions to the typical but unstandardized pattern. Religious literature, including primers, accounted for a substantial proportion of all publications in England through the early 16th century. Bound books like primers were supplemented by a variety of pamphlets oriented towards private devotion, including adaptions of the Psalms, sermons, and religious educational texts. Since English demand outstripped domestic printing capacity, Parisian printers like François Regnault dominated the market for Sarum primers.

=== Pre-Reformation contents and variation ===
The contents of one primer dating from circa 1400 were:

- 1. Matins and lesser hours of the Little Office
- 2. Evensong and Compline of the Little Office
- 3. Penitential Psalms
- 4. Fifteen Psalms (Psalms of Degrees)
- 5. Litany
- 6. Vespers of the Office of the Dead (Latin: Placebo)
- 7. Matins and Lauds of the Office of the Dead (Latin: Dirige)
- 8. Psalms of Commendation
- 9. Pater Noster
- 10. Ave Maria
- 11. Nicene Creed
- 12. Ten Commandments
- 13. Seven deadly sins

The Passion of Jesus was heavily emphasized within medieval piety, forming the center of English private devotion akin to the centrality of the crucifix in the liturgy. Among the most popular devotions to the Passion that appeared within pre-Reformation Sarum primers was the prayer "Oh bone Gesu", derived from Anselm of Canterbury's Mediations. This and other primer prayers would also emphasize a kinship with Jesus that remained salient from the 14th century through to the Reformation. Another popular prayer in English primers was "Adoro te, Domine Jesu Christe, in cruce pendentem". Commonly associated with the Wounds of Jesus, the prayer contained seven short sections and was connected to substantial indulgences. This prayer, which originated by the 9th-century and is found within the Book of Cerne, formed a significant aspect of English lay devotion both within and outside the primer. Traditionally, primers also had a tendency to include eccentric and superstitious devotions.

It is from Dirige, the Latin word for the Matins and Lauds of the Office of the Dead as they were contained in primers, that the English word "dirge" is derived; Placebo and Dirige being among the first words recited of the evening and morning offices respectively. The Dirige, accompanied by gifts to the poor, would often be recited at funerals and during the "month's mind" and anniversary of a given death.

Typically, the liturgical contents of primers—both manuscripts and printed editions—would be wholly in Latin. While some late 15th-century English-language manuscript primers rendered the Little Office, the Office of the Dead, and the Psalms into English, printers in England would officially produce none that translated these elements into the vernacular prior to the independence of the Church of England. Pre-Reformation, the production of translations of the Bible or its contents was prohibited in England. To circumvent this, some early English Reformers and late Lollards successfully imported foreign-printed vernacular primers in the 1530s despite official efforts to suppress this trade. While importation would sometimes be restricted, at least 60 percent of English breviaries, books of hours, primers, and manuals came from abroad during the first half of the 16th century.

== English Reformation and later primers ==
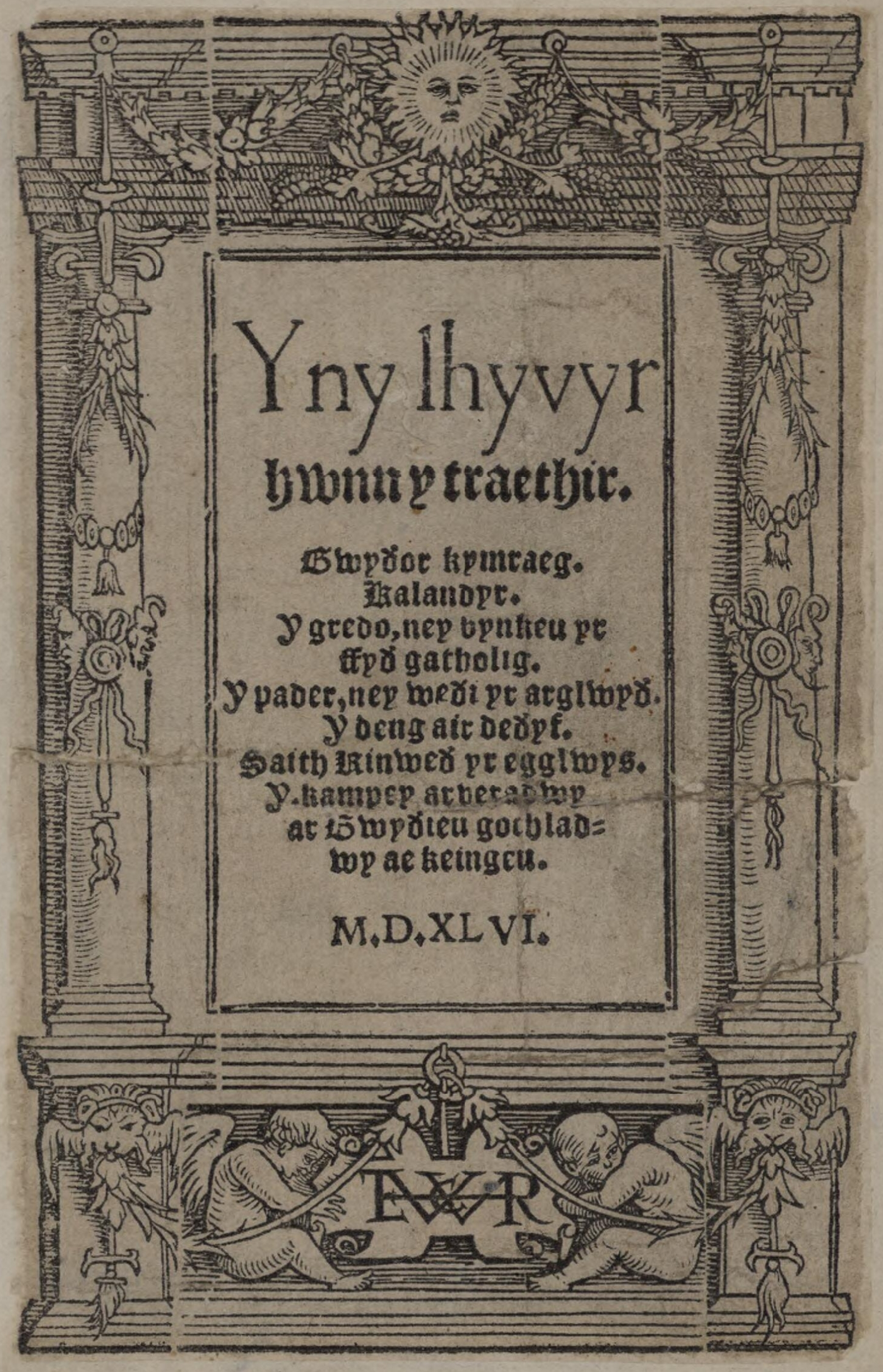
The title page of Yny lhyvyr hwnn, a 1546 primer that became the first Welsh-language printed book

At least 116 editions of the Sarum primer were produced between 1478 and 1534; (Note: The total printed editions of English primers until 1549 are known for both the Sarum and York Uses–with 184 and 5 respectively–and demonstrate, alongside totals of other liturgical books printed in the same period, the "overwhelming predominance" of the Sarum Use in England.) immediately prior to Henry VIII's full separation of the Church of England from the Catholic Church, an unreformed primer according to the Sarum Use was printed in Paris. The Reformation saw primers produced in a similarly proliferate fashion; in the 13 years following the 1534 break, 28 editions were printed in English. Reformed vernacular translations of the primer were officially authorized by the Church of England and printed that same year as English ecclesial independence. In 1535, printer and translator William Marshall collaborated with John Byddell to produce a second reformed English primer. In 1539, John Hilsey produced a more conservative translation that retained some Latin at the behest of Thomas Cromwell.

Another primer, King Henry's Primer–also in English and Latin–superseded these prior editions and included a 1544 reformed litany and additional devotions An injunction accompanied this primer, imploring schoolmasters to use it in teaching children to read and learn prayers. Produced by Archbishop of Canterbury Thomas Cranmer, the new primer reflected his difficulty in liturgical reform. Cranmer's reformed litany, (Note: Cranmer's 1544 litany combined several scriptural and Sarum elements that had been previously combined in a similar way by William Marshall's 1535 Godly Primer.) much-shortened liturgical calendar, and less penitential Dirige replaced the medieval patterns. The king's primer, authorized directly by the monarch, was printed in at least two versions in 1545. This primer would establish the pattern of English prayer books and private devotion for the next century, enabling and officially encouraging the laity to worship according to the public services of the church in their own home.

Henry VIII's primer was reprinted under Edward VI in 1547 and 1549, the latter with the revised Litany as present in the first Book of Common Prayer published the same year. The significant popularity of primers in the century preceding the Reformation has been identified as contributing English lay familiarity with the canonical hours–particularly the Psalms, prayers, and litanies–as contained within the Book of Common Prayer. The Sarum and York primer's wedding exhortation and a matrimonial homily were included in the 1549 prayer book, though the blessings of the ring and bride-bed present in the Sarum primer were deleted. Henrician primers likely greatly influenced the generation which became leaders under Elizabeth I.

A 1546 modified primer, Yny lhyvyr hwnn, by John Prise would become the first book printed in Welsh. This text lacked the canonical hours and featured significant humanist elements; its educational qualities have been compared to the later Elizabethan alphabet book and catechism, The ABC with the Catechism.

Under Edward VI, a revised version of Henry's primer was introduced in 1551. This text had a less mariological bent than Henry's primer but retained traditional elements. In 1553, a new Edwardine primer appeared towards the end of the young king's reign; this latter primer reflected an further degree of reformed theology. These protestantizing deviations were followed by a reversion to pre-Reformation Sarum primer formulas under the Catholic Mary I's five-year reign; there were 34 editions of the primer published under Mary. Despite Queen Mary's anti-Protestantism, many of the psalms and prayers in the authorized 1555 primer were in common with the 1545 king's primer.

The restoration of Reformation principles with Elizabeth I's ascent to the English throne saw the primer increasingly associated with the catechisms also produced during her reign, as well as the Elizabethan Book of Common Prayer. The 1559 Elizabethan primer was part of Elizabethan Religious Settlement program to restore traditional worship in a reformed context and was soon accompanied by two other authorized devotional books: Orarium in 1560 and Preces Privatae in 1564. (Note: The Orarium, the canonical hours in Latin, was published again in 1573. The Preces Privatae, also in Latin, was published again in 1568, 1573, and 1574.) The other categories p Elizabeth's royal injunctions introduced the 1559 primer based on the 1551 model. Among the few deviations from the moderately reformed 1551 primer were the removal of the litany's deprecation of the pope and the addition of the new "An order for Morning Prayer daily through the year". This latter change was most likely a late interpolation intended to align the primer with the 1559 Book of Common Prayer. With the 1559 Elizabethan primer, both Matins and Vespers were consolidated under the name of Dirige. The 1559 primer was intended as a means for schoolmasters to teach children how to read and write and included Henry's order for its use as such. The more traditional primer patterns preserved under Elizabeth may have been responsible for the later Caroline Divines's positive sentiments towards catholic devotion.

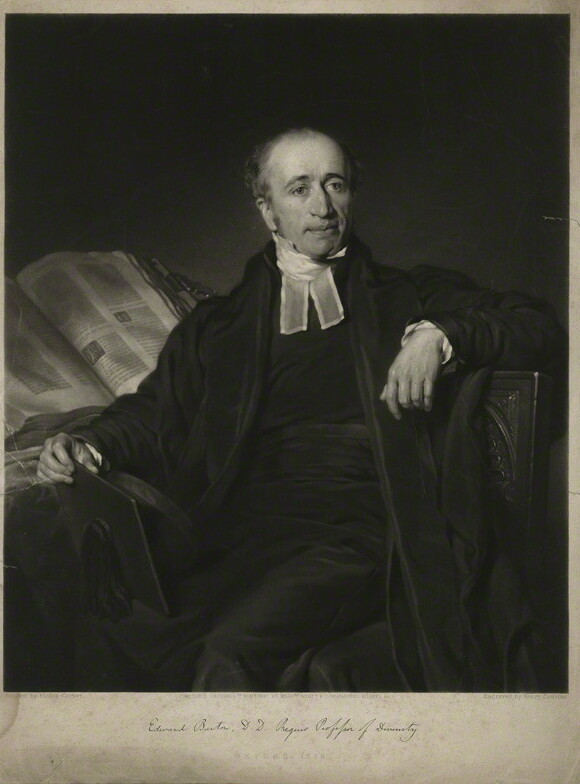
Edward Burton produced influential reprints of three Henrican primers during the 19th century.

Although the royal injunctions prohibited the print of any other primers, Elizabeth permitted the publication of a more reformed primer in 1560. This permission did not allow it to replace or serve as alternative to the 1559 primer and was never authorized for educating children; it deleted the 1553 primer's phrase that the text was meant to be "taught, learned, read, and used." Printing of similarly unauthorized books–distinguishing themselves as "A Primer" rather than "The Primer"–continued through the end of Elizabeth's reign. Despite the prohibition against it, they were likely used for teaching children with an alphabet inserted into one edition printed around 1564. It is possible Elizabeth allowed the 1553-styled primers due to their proximity to the 1552 Book of Common Prayer which had been adapted as the 1559 prayer book she approved.

Despite some reformed sentiments towards prayers for the dead, the Church of England's primers from 1559 until their gradual disuse retained the Office of the Dead but deleted Marian devotions. It was during this period that the primers increasingly lost their religious emphasis and were adapted into secular primer textbooks. These secular texts remained influenced by the patterns present in religious primers while overtly catechizing nonconformist primers continued to compete with official Anglican catechisms through the 18th century. By 1604, publication of devotional literature no longer required royal initiative and the 1553 pattern was more widely accepted.

English Protestant devotional primers were occasionally published through 1870, with three Henrician primers reprinted by Edward Burton in the early 19th century among the most influential Oxford reprints of the period. William Keatinge Clay edited a series of Elizabethan devotionals published by Cambridge in the mid-19th century. In the introduction to these editions, Clay identified the 1559 and 1566 versions and 1575 edition of the primers as among the variety of authorized devotionals in the Elizabethan period, in distinction from the Edwardian forms reprinted during the 16th-century.

Catholic primers continued to see occasional production. Among them was a 1599 translation of the post-Tridentine Officium Beatae Mariae Virginis into English by Richard Verstegan and printed in Antwerp. Historian of English literature J.M. Blom argued that the 42 editions of Catholic primers printed between 1599 and 1800 were of great historical and literary importance; recusancy historian John Aveling disputed this thesis and argued that English primers had a limited circulation in small but consistent community. Aveling that the English prose was of similar quality in Catholic primers as in contemporary Protestant devotionals. John Dryden, England's first poet laureate, is thought to have translated several hymns found in a 1706 Catholic primer. A renewed edition of the Catholic primer was officially sanctioned in the early 20th century, but was coolly received and failed to attain the same popularity as in prior centuries.

== See also ==
- Edwardine Ordinals
- Hornbook
- Penitential
