= St Guthlac's Priory =

Priory in Hereford, Herefordshire, England

Coordinates: 52.0576°N 2.707°W

St Guthlac's Priory (or the Benedictine Priory of Saints Peter, Paul and Guthlac) was a Benedictine priory in Hereford, England. It was originally founded in the early 12th century near the Church of St Guthlac in town. After the church was ruined circa 1143, during the Anarchy, it relocated to a site between the present day Bath Street and Commercial Road at grid reference SO51534019.

It was disestablished in 1538 as part of the Dissolution of the Monasteries during the English Reformation, and purchased by John Prise.

In 1982, excavations carried out in Hereford City Centre on the site of the medieval St Guthlac’s Priory (1143–1537) discovered the remains of the monks buried there. It was decided that they would be exhumed and reinterred within the grounds of Belmont Abbey in the monks’ cemetery. A small gravestone marks the spot. The text reads in Latin: “HIC IACENT OSSA MONACHORUM MONASTERII ST GUTHLACI PROPE HEREFORDIAM. SEPULTA 22-5-1982.” English translation; “Here lie the bones of the monks of the monastery of St. Guthlac, near Hereford. Buried 22-5-1982.”

== Priors ==
- Thomas Conyngesby, fl. 1485
