= Compendium Compertorum =

The 1536 Compendium Compertorum is a title of a handwritten document listing clerical abuses by the Roman Catholic Church in England and Wales. It was used by Henry VIII of England to give religious justification to the dissolution of the monasteries during the English Reformation.

There are actually two documents under this title that both list "comperts" (an obsolete Anglicisation of Latin: comperta, "findings"), summaries of the results of visits to monasteries and nunneries of England made by a royal commission in the second half of 1535 and early 1536:

- the first document contains 16 pages of the commissioners' findings from Northern England and is usually the one for which the historians use the brief name "Compendium Compertorum" (the full title is Compendium compertorum per Doctorem Layton et Doctorem Legh, in visitatione regia Provincia Eboracensi ac Episcopatu Coven. & Lichfielden). The author is unknown (handwriting of William Blithman, one of the commissioners, is disputed);
- the second document covers only the Norwich diocese, consists of just four pages, and has a brief title Compendium compertorum. It was written by John ap Rhys, another commissioner.

Most historians assume that the Compendium Compertorum documents contain text that was actually read in the Parliament in 1536, but some are suggesting that there was yet another, comprehensive, and now lost, account of the visits.

== Sources ==
- Rex, Richard (2023). "The Lost Breviarium Compertorum and Henry VIII's First Act for the Dissolution of the Monasteries, 1536" (PDF). The Journal of Ecclesiastical History. 74 (4): 738–752. doi:10.1017/S0022046923000027. ISSN 0022-0469.
- Shaw, Anthony N (April 2003). The Compendium Compertorum and the making of the Suppression Act of 1536 (PDF) (Doctor of Philosophy thesis). University of Warwick.
