= John Trevor (died 1357) =

Welsh bishop

John Trevor (Welsh: Ieuan Trefor) (died 1357) was the first man of that name to hold the position of Bishop of St Asaph in north Wales, from 1346 to 1357.

The famous bridge across the River Dee at Llangollen, Denbighshire is reputed to have been built in about 1345 by John Trevor, who was then living at nearby Trefor Hall. His father, Iorwerth ab Adda, is buried at nearby Valle Crucis Abbey.
