= David Rathbone =

English politician

David Rathbone (died before 1426) was an English politician. He sat as MP for Shrewsbury in 1419. He served as bailiff in 1407–1408, 1415–1416 and 1419–1420.

Before August 1398, he married Juliana and they had one son who predeceased him. He married his second wife, Agnes. After his death, Agnes married John Falk (who was bailiff of Shrewsbury in 1435) in 1426.
