= Wiliam Midleton =

Welsh-language poet and adventurer

Wiliam Midleton (c.1550 – 1596) was a poet in the Welsh language and an adventurer.

== Biography ==
A native of Llansannan, Denbighshire, Midleton entered into the service of William Herbert, first earl of Pembroke (d. 1570) as his secretary, subsequently serving Henry Herbert, the second earl. At the Herberts' home of Wilton he came to know Sir Philip Sidney, the brother of Henry Herbert's wife, Mary. Midleton accompanied Sidney to the Netherlands in 1585, serving as his ensign-bearer at the battle of Zutphen. In 1589 he participated in the unsuccessful English expedition to Portugal. He subsequently embarked on a career as a privateer, being recorded in October 1589 as the captain of the Elizabeth and Mary, a ship owned by his cousin, the London merchant Thomas Myddelton, which sailed into Plymouth with a captured Brazilian. In 1590 he sailed another of his cousin's ships, the Riall, capturing two argosies bound for Lisbon from Florence, with a cargo worth £13,000. Midleton's privateering career is perhaps reflected in a claim in a Welsh manuscript owned by Thomas Pennant that Midleton and two companions (one of them being Thomas Prys, another Welsh poet and privateer) were 'the first that smoaked Tobacco publickly at London'. The English writer Richard Robinson (1544/5–1603) records Midleton's privateering exploits in the ships of George Clifford, third earl of Cumberland (1558–1605), citing Midleton as his source for his account of eight of Clifford's privateering voyages. In 1595 Midleton sailed with Sir Francis Drake and Sir John Hopkins as captain of the Salomon Bonaventure in their abortive expedition to Panama. Whilst anchored at the island of Escudo, not inhabited but full of Tarrtasis and Aligators', Midleton completed his Welsh metrical version of the psalms on 24 January 1596. Richard Robinson records that Midleton died at Falmouth on return from Panama.

== Poetry ==
Midleton was born into a family that had been the patrons of poets. He learnt the craft of strict-metre Welsh bardic poetry and around 1594 he wrote Bardhoniaeth, neu brydydhiaeth, which he intended to act as an aid to amateur litterateurs who wished to practise the craft.

Midleton's metrical Welsh version of some of the psalms, entitled Rhann o Psalmae Dauyd, a Phrophwyti eraill, was probably published in 1595 before his departure for Panama. His completed version, Psalmae y brenhinol brophwyd Dafydh was published posthumously in 1603. Midleton's acquaintance with Sir Philip Sidney is relevant in this connection. Like Sidney's own metrical psalms, Midleton's psalms were intended as a metrical tour de force; they employed a wide variety of metres to display the variety of Welsh prosody. It is likely that they were directly inspired by the example of Sidney's psalms.
