= Morys Clynnog =

16th-century Welsh Catholic writer

Morys Clynnog (also Morus or Clynog; c. 1525–1581), also known as Maurice Clen(n)ock(e), was a Welsh Roman Catholic priest and recusant exile. He was the first head of the English College, Rome. He was born at Llŷn or Eifionydd (present-day Gwynedd) circa 1525 and died at sea in 1581.

== Life ==
He was educated at the University of Oxford, where he was admitted Bachelor of Canon Law in 1548. During the reign of Mary I he became almoner and secretary to Cardinal Pole, prebendary of York, rector of Orpington (Kent), and dean of Shoreham and Croydon, and chancellor of the prerogative court of Canterbury.

In 1556 he was made rector of Corwen in the Diocese of St Asaph, and on the death of the Bishop of Bangor in 1558 was nominated to the vacant see, but was never consecrated, owing to the change of religion under Elizabeth I. Surrendering all his preferments, he accompanied Thomas Goldwell, Bishop of St Asaph, to Rome, where they resided in the English hospital, of which Clynnog was camerarius in 1567. In 1578 he was made its warden. At the same time Pope Gregory XIII ordered the hospital to be converted into a college, until England should return to the Catholic Church.

The warden was made the first rector of the college by the pope; but Cardinal Allen judged him unfit, though he described him as "an honest and friendly man and a great advancer of the students' and seminaries' cause" (Letter to Owen Lewis, 12 May 1579). Despite his personal good qualities he did not prove a competent ruler. He was accused of unduly favouring his fellow-countrymen at the expense of the English students, who numbered thirty-three as against seven Welsh students. Allen wrote, "Mischief and murder had like to have been committed in ipso collegio" (letter cited above). The students, having unsuccessfully appealed to the Pope, left the college; finally, in April 1579, the Pope appointed Alfonso Agazzari, S. J., rector, leaving Clynnog still warden of the hospital.

He retired, however, in 1580 to Rouen, where he took ship for Spain, but was lost at sea, drowned early in 1581 on a sea voyage to Spain. In contemporary documents he is frequently referred to as "Dr. Morrice".

== Works ==
He was a friend and associate of the Welsh Catholic priest and scholar Gruffydd Robert and spent time in exile with him in Milan where he published Athrawaeth Gristnogawl, a Welsh Catechism.
