= John Marshall (bishop) =

Bishop of Llandaff (died 1496)

John Marshall (or Marshal) (died 1496) was a Bishop of Llandaff in Wales.

John was a fellow of Merton College, Oxford and a canon of Windsor. On 6 September 1478, he was consecrated Bishop of Llandaff. He is well remembered for having repaired the damage done to the cathedral during Owain Glyndŵr's reign. He also erected a new bishop's throne and a reredos, parts of which survives. He died in January or February 1496 and was buried in Llandaff Cathedral where his monumental effigy may still be seen.
