= Trevor Hall, Denbighshire =

Trevor Hall
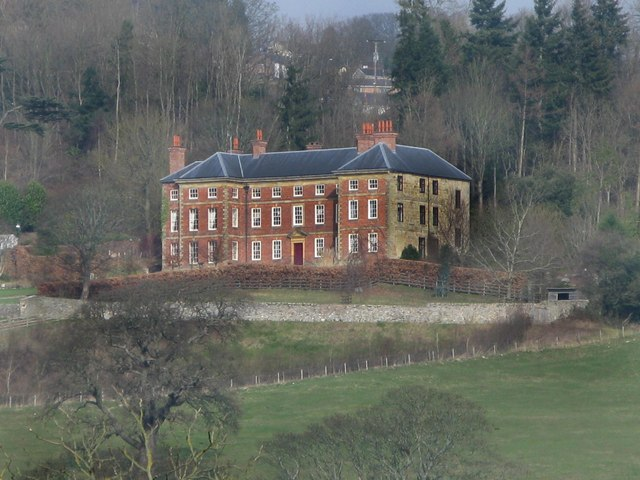
- Interactive map of Trevor Hall
- 52.97285°N 3.10888°W
- Location: Trevor, Denbighshire, Wales

History
- Built: 1742
- Built for: John Lloyd

Site notes
- Architectural style: Georgian

Listed Building – Grade I
- Reference no.: 1350

Trevor Hall is a large grade I-listed Georgian mansion standing in 85 acres (35 hectares) of parkland at Trevor, near Llangollen, Denbighshire, Wales.

The three storey house was built in 1742 in red brick to an H-shaped floor plan. A pedimented doorcase is approached by a double flight of steps.

The estate had belonged to the Trevor family since medieval times and was at one time the home of Bishop John Trevor, who built the original Llangollen Bridge in 1345. The present house was built for John Lloyd of Glanhavon, Montgomeryshire, who in 1715 had married Mary Trevor, heiress of the Trevor estate. A carved stone on the outside of the house has their initials, the date 1742, and the Latin motto Dum spiro spero (whilst I breathe, I hope).

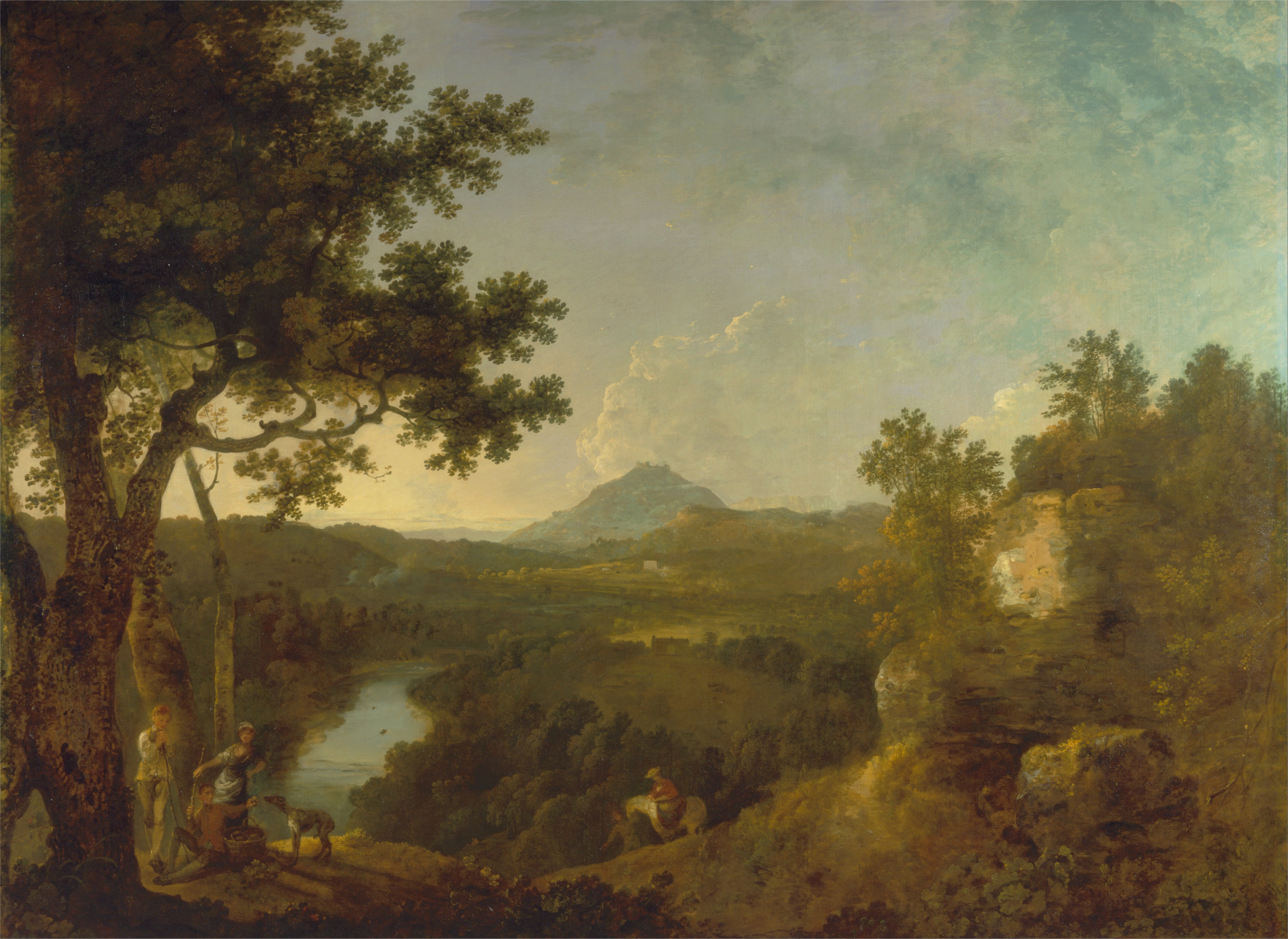
View near Wynnstay by Richard Wilson, 1771. Trevor Hall can be seen in the distance.

Ownership passed to the Rice Thomas family when the last Lloyd heiress married Rice Thomas of Coed Helen near Caernarvon. They extended the house and occupied in until 1820, after which it was let to various tenants, including the manager of the local ironworks, a shipping broker from Liverpool, and ultimately the Edwards family, owners of the Trefynant Fire Clay Works of Ruabon. James Coster Edwards was High Sheriff of Denbighshire in 1892. The Edwards family carried out various improvements designed by Oswestry architect W.H. Spaull and occupied the hall for three generations, after which, in 1956, the property reverted to the Coed Helen estate.

They had no use for the house and it was sold to a local timber merchant, who felled the trees and planned to demolish the house. Saved by a Preservation order in 1961, the hall was acquired by the WRVS, but damaged by fire in 1963. It was then purchased by a local farmer and equipped with a flat roof for use as a cowshed.

The property was purchased in 1987 by Michael Tree, then a chartered surveyor of the Crown Estates, who undertook its restoration before selling it in 1998 to Louis and Louise Parker, who further restored the grounds and interior. It now functions as a country hotel.

The former GWR Hall class locomotive 5998 was named after the hall.
