= Yny lhyvyr hwnn =

First book printed in Welsh

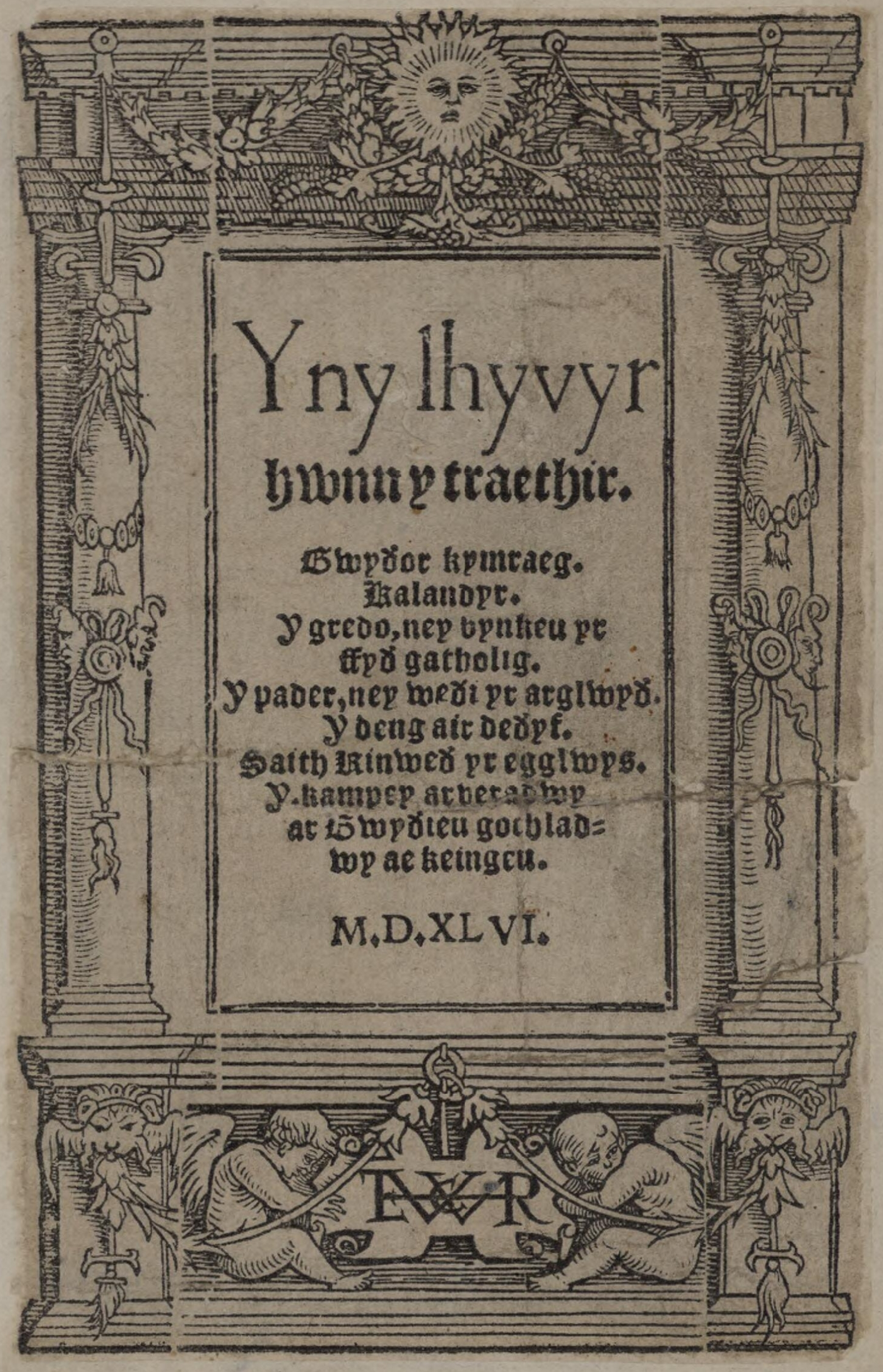
The title page of Yny lhyvyr hwnn

Yny lhyvyr hwnn (In this book) was the first book to be printed in the Welsh language. It was written by Sir John Price of Brecon, a nobleman and secretary of the Council of Wales and the Marches. He was one of the most important Welsh manuscript collectors of his time, particularly after the dissolution of the monasteries. The publication's main objective was to correct the lack of material, and specifically, the lack of religious material, available in the Welsh language. As Yny lhyvyr hwnn was a Renaissance humanist venture with the aim to put into print the heritage of Welsh literature, Price also included an ABC section and the first Welsh printed alphabet. A record of English, European and Welsh saints was added, as well as a monthly forecast for agricultural purposes. The last section of the pamphlet is a comprehensive religious text, approximating contemporary primer prayer books but sans the canonical hours. These subjects dominated many early Welsh publications. Yny lhyvyr hwnn was printed in London by Edward Whitchurch in 1546.

The National Library of Wales holds the only known copy. It was part of the foundation collection donated by Sir John Williams to the Library in 1908.

== See also ==
- Y Drych Cristianogawl - The first book to be printed in Wales
