= Morris Kyffin =

Morris Kyffin (c. 1555 – 2 January 1598) was a Welsh author and soldier, brother of the poet Edward Kyffin. He was also a student and friend of Doctor John Dee. Kyffin was a member of a literary circle that included the Queen's Godson Sir John Harington (writer), Edmund Spenser, and William Camden.

Kyffin wrote two dedicatory poems to works by Sir Lewis Lewknor, the first appeared in 1593 The Resolved Gentleman and the second in 1599 in Lewkenor's translation of Gasparo Contarini's De magistratibus et republica Venetorum.

Lewkenor, whom arms and letters have made known, In this work hath the fruits of either shown. Maur. Kiffen

His best known works are the poem The Blessedness of Britayne (1587) and the first translation into English of Terence's comedy Andria (1588). In the same year he was appointed surveyor of the muster rolls to the English army in the Low Countries and in 1592 he was vice-treasurer of the 'old bands' in Normandy.
