= John Prise =

Member of the Parliament of England

The Honourable Sir John Prise
- Welsh: Syr Siôn ap Rhys
- Born: c. 1501–1502; Brecon
- Died: 15 October 1555 (aged 52–53); St Guthlac's Priory, Hereford
- Resting place: Hereford Cathedral; 52.0542°N 2.716°W
- Education: University of Oxford; University of Cambridge (BCL)
- Occupations: Administrator; scholar
- Notable work: Yny lhyvyr hwnn
- Spouse: Joan Williamson (m. 1534)
- Children: Katherine Prise; with Joan: Gregory Prise; Richard Prise; John Prise; William Prise; Bartholomew Prise; Eleanor Prise; Joan Prise; Jane Prise; Mary Prise; Ursula Prise
- Parents: Rhys ap Gwilym ap Llywelyn (father); Gwenllian ferch Hywel Madog (mother)

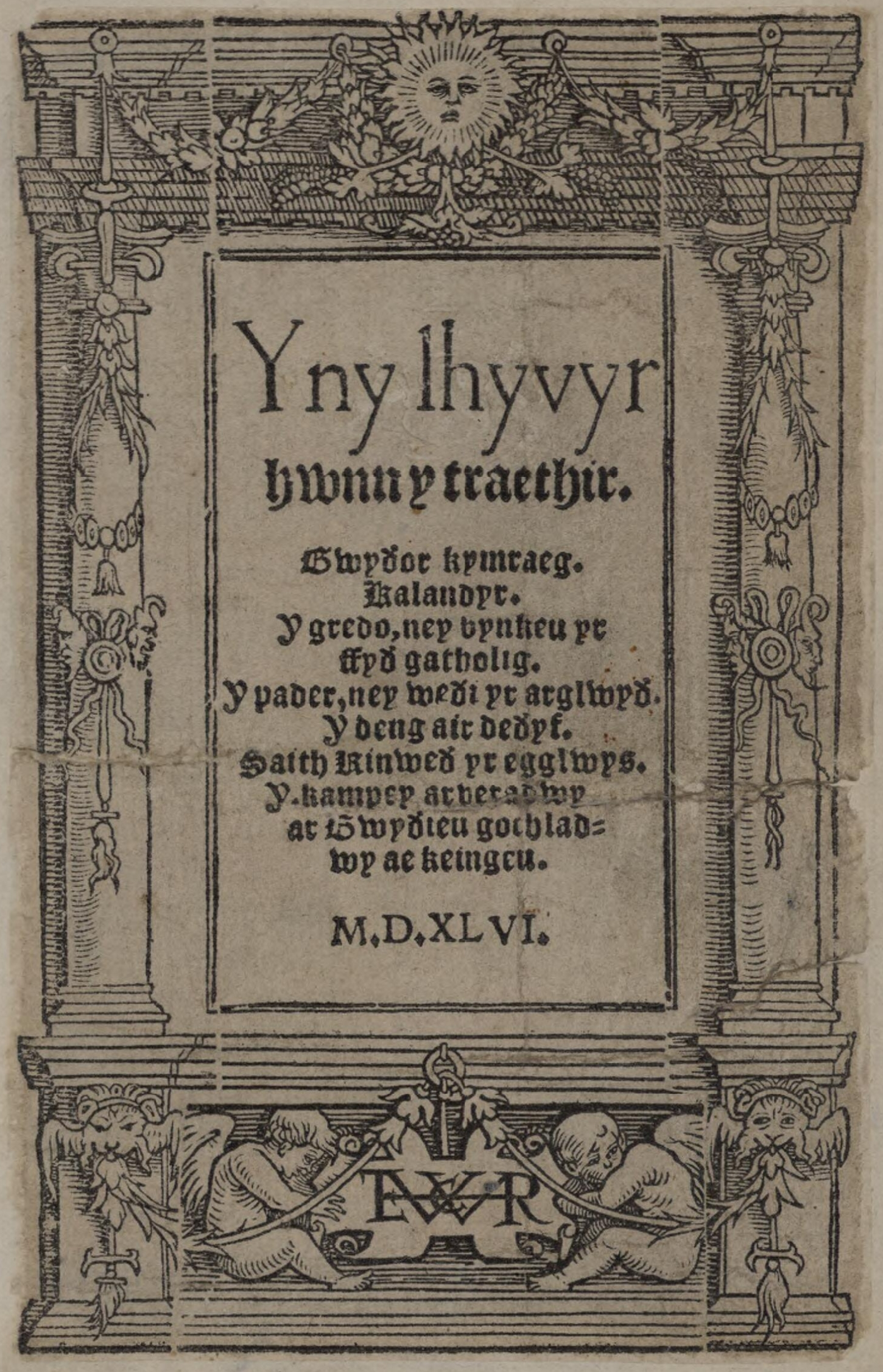
The title page of Yny lhyvyr hwnn by Prise, a primer that was the first printed book in Welsh

Sir John Prise (also Prys, Price; Welsh: Syr Siôn ap Rhys) (1501/2 – 15 October 1555) of Brecon and Hereford, was a Welsh public notary, who acted as a royal agent and visitor of the monasteries. He was also a scholar, associated with the first Welsh printed publication Yn y lhyvyr hwnn. He was a Member (MP) of the Parliament of England for Breconshire in 1547; Hereford October 1553; Ludlow April 1554; and Ludgershall November 1554.

== Life ==
John was the son of Rhys ap Gwilym by Gwenllian, daughter of Howel Madoc, born between 12 October 1501 and 11 October 1502, in Brecon. He was educated at Oxford, practiced in the Court of Arches and subsequently graduated BCL at Cambridge in 1535/6. By 1530 he was a servant of Thomas Cromwell, to whom he would later be related by marriage.

In May 1532, when the Earl of Westmorland and the Earl of Cumberland and Sir Thomas Clifford searched Cuthbert Tunstall's house at Bishop Auckland, Price looked into the manuscripts, and made a report to Cromwell. In June 1533 he was one of the "servitors at the dresser", responsible for managing the "dresser" (a table or sideboard) where food was prepared and arranged before being served at the coronation of Anne Boleyn.

=== Family ===
On 11 October 1534 at Thomas Cromwell's house at Islington, he married the minister's niece, Joan (b. c. 1515/6), daughter of John Williamson of Southwark, by whom he had eleven children:
six sons, including:

- Gregory Prise (6 August 1535–1600), married 1. Mary, daughter of Humphrey Coningsby (d. 1558) of Hampton Court, Herefordshire; 2. Grissel, daughter of Walter Roberts of Glassenbury, Kent, widow of Gervase Gebons.
- Richard Prise (c.1538–c.1587), married Elizabeth, daughter of William Wightman of Harrow on the Hill, Middlesex.
- John Prise, married Elizabeth, daughter of John Games.
- William Prise
- Bartholomew Prise

five daughters:

- Eleanor Prise, married Thomas Walwin (d. 1580) of Longford.
- Joan Prise (b. 14 November 1542), married 1. Thomas Williams of Estradfyn, Cardigan; 2. Sir George Devereux of Lamphey Court, Pembrokeshire; 3. Thomas Jones (c.1530–1609) of Fountain Gate, alias Twm Siôn Cati.
- Jane Prise
- Mary Prise, married Thomas Morgan of Lanver, Monmouthshire.
- Ursula Prise

The first four children were born in London, and their names indicate their father's connections in the city: the eldest son was named after Thomas Cromwell's son, Gregory, the second surviving son after Cromwell's nephew, Richard, and the eldest daughter, Eleanor, after the wife of Christopher Barker, Garter King of Arms. From 8 June 1540 he had the lease, and from 13 November 1542 the grant in fee, of the priory of St Guthlac at Hereford, which he made his principal residence, and where his fifth and subsequent children were born. He was also granted Brecon Priory in 1542.

This may not have been Prise's first marriage, as his will refers to a married daughter, ″my Daughter Gomonde″, Katherine, the 1st wife of James Gomond of Byford, Herefordshire, who was older than any of the children he had with Joan.

In December 1534 Prise was granted the registrarship of the bishopric of Salisbury. In April 1535 he took part in the proceedings against the Carthusians as to the royal supremacy. He officiated in the same way at the trial of John Fisher and Thomas More. He took part in the major visitation of the monasteries of 1535, alongside Sir Thomas Legh and penned one of the summaries of the visit (cf. Compendium Compertorum). When the Pilgrimage of Grace was quelled, he assisted in trying the rebels. For his services he received in 1537–38 a joint lease of Carmarthen rectory, and a lease of Brecon Priory and rectory. He also bought St Guthlac's Priory in Hereford. In a petition of 1538 he asked for the manor of West Dereham. A letter from Rowland Lee to Thomas Cromwell indicates that Prise had been some time in the service of the Earl of Arundel as constable of Clun Castle.

In April 1535 he took part in the proceedings against the Carthusians as to the royal supremacy. He officiated in the same way at the trial of John Fisher and Thomas More. He took part in the major visitation of the monasteries of 1535, alongside Sir Thomas Legh and penned one of the summaries of the visit (cf. Compendium Compertorum). He was a public notary by 1536.

When the Pilgrimage of Grace was quelled, he assisted in trying the rebels. For his services he received in 1537–38 a joint lease of Carmarthen rectory, and a lease of Brecon Priory and rectory. He also bought St Guthlac's Priory in Hereford. In a petition of 1538 he asked for the manor of West Dereham.

He took part in public affairs, for example in the union of England and Wales, drafting or suggesting the petition on which the statutes were framed. He was Sheriff of Breconshire in 1541, and lived chiefly at Brecon Priory. He served as a justice of the peace (JP) for Herefordshire, Monmouthshire, Shropshire, Welsh counties in 1543 and for Cheshire, Glouctershire and Worcestershire from 1545 to 1547. He was knighted on 22 February 1547, two days after the coronation of Edward VI. He was elected knight of the shire for Breconshire in the same year, and became secretary of the council for the Welsh marches in 1551.

During the reign of Mary I he was elected MP for the seat of Hereford in October 1553, for Ludlow in April 1554, and for Ludgershall in November 1554.

=== Death ===
He died on 15 October 1555 at St Guthlac's Priory, survived by his widow and ten of their children. In his will, dated 6 October 1555, he bequeathed his soul to God, to ″owre blessede ladie Sainte Marye And to all the blessed cumpanie of heavin″ and requested prayers on its behalf. He made numerous bequests, including sums of money for his daughters′ marriages, and asked to be buried in Hereford Cathedral.

== Works ==
Prise was encouraged as a scholar by the patronage of William Herbert, 1st Earl of Pembroke, and became a collector of manuscripts. He wrote:

- Historiae Britannicae Defensio, composed about 1553, published by his son Richard in 1573, and dedicated to Lord Burghley; in part a protest against Polydore Vergil. It defended the traditional historical accounts of Brutus of Troy and King Arthur in early British history.
- Description of Cambria, translated and enlarged by Humphrey Lhuyd, and published as part of The Historie of Cambria, Now Called Wales by David Powel, 1584; other editions 1697, 1702, 1774, and 1812.
- Fides Historian Britannicae, a correction of Polydore Vergil (Brit. Mus. Cotton MS. Titus, F. iii. 17).
- A tract on the restitution of the coinage, written in 1553; dedicated to Queen Mary (MS. New Coll. Oxon. Arch. MS. 317, iii.); in this tract he refers to a larger treatise on the same subject, which is not extant.

He is also said to have translated and published the Lord's Prayer, Creed, and Ten Commandments in Welsh, for the first time, in Yn y lhyvyr hwnn (1546).

=== Modern editions ===
- Davies, Ceri, ed. (2015). John Price: Historiae Britannicae defensio: A defence of the British history. Studies and texts. Vol. 195. Toronto, Ontario, Canada / Oxford: Pontifical Institute of Mediaeval Studies / The Bodleian Library. ISBN 978-0-88844-195-9. OCLC 901996317.

== Arms ==
Coat of arms of John Prise

Crest
A cock Gules, combed and legged Or, charged on the neck with two bars of the second, holding in the beak a heartsease.
Escutcheon
Sable, on a chevron between three leopards' heads Argent as many spear-heads of the field, on a chief of the second as many cocks Gules.
Motto
Sine flore in originali
(Latin for "Without flower in the original")

Parliament of England
Preceded by John Games alias Ap Morgan	Member of Parliament for Breconshire; 1547–1552	Succeeded by Roger Vaughan
Preceded by Hugh Welshe (not known}	Member of Parliament for Hereford; October 1553–December 1553; With: Thomas Havard	Succeeded by Thomas Havard; Thomas Bromwich
Preceded by Thomas Wheeler; John Passey	Member of Parliament for Ludlow; April 1554–May 1554; With: Thomas Blashefield	Succeeded by James Warnecombe; John Allsop
Preceded by John Winchcombe; Edmund Powell	Member of Parliament for Ludgershall; November 1554–January 1555; With: Arthur Allen	Succeeded by John Story; John Winchcombe
