= Neath Abbey =

Former Cistercian monastery in South Wales

Coordinates: 51.6609°N 3.8265°W

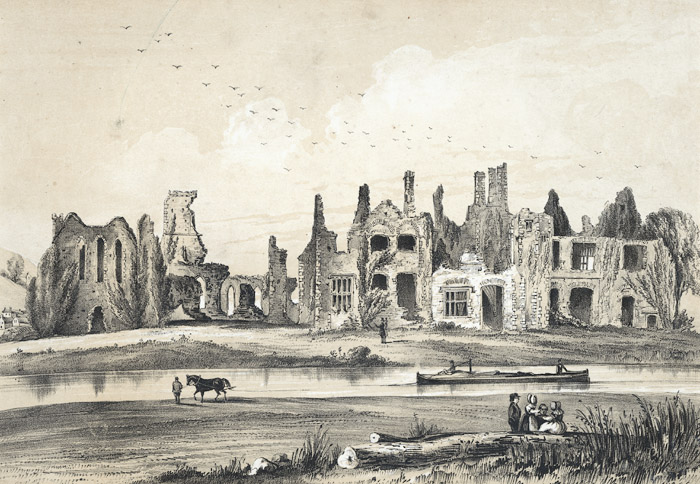
Neath abbey, 1849

Neath Abbey (Welsh: Abaty Nedd) was a Cistercian monastery, located near the present-day town of Neath in South Wales, UK. It was once the largest abbey in Wales. Substantial ruins can still be seen, and are in the care of Cadw. Tudor historian John Leland called Neath Abbey "the fairest abbey of all Wales."

== History ==
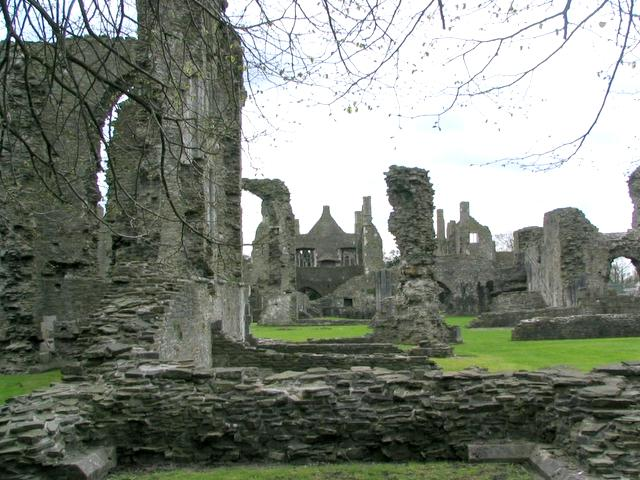
Ruins of Neath Abbey

Neath Abbey was established in 1129 AD when Richard I de Grenville (d.post 1142), one of the Twelve Knights of Glamorgan, gave 8,000 acres (3,200 ha) of his estate in Glamorgan, Wales, to Savigniac monks from western Normandy. The first monks arrived in 1130. Following the merging of the Savigniac order into the Cistercian order in 1147, Neath Abbey also became a Cistercian house. The abbey was ravaged by the Welsh uprisings of the 13th century. During the dissolution of the monasteries by King Henry VIII of England the last abbot, Lleision ap Thomas, managed to buy time through payment of a large fine in 1536, but the abbey was dissolved in 1539. In letters to the Cistercian General Chapter, Lleision served as a spokesman for the Welsh abbeys.

At this time, the abbey was turned into a large estate, initially granted to Richard Williams, although by 1600 it was owned by Sir John Herbert, and had a substantial Tudor mansion occupying a part of the cloisters. The mansion itself was only habitable for 100 years or so, before being abandoned as the site became a scene of industry.

The ruins of Neath Abbey are now surrounded by commercial and industrial premises.

== Industrial use ==
By 1730, some of the buildings were being used for copper smelting, and the rest were abandoned. In the late 18th century, an iron foundry was opened near the abbey ruins by a company owned by the Price, Fox and Tregelles families. The ruined walls of both the Abbey and later mansion were gradually engulfed in quantities of industrial waste. The ownership of the site passed to the Rice family, Barons Dynevor, and it was in the 1920s, under Walter FitzUryan Rice, 7th Baron Dynevor that a local group of amateur archaeologists began the process of uncovering the medieval ruins.

== Archaeology ==
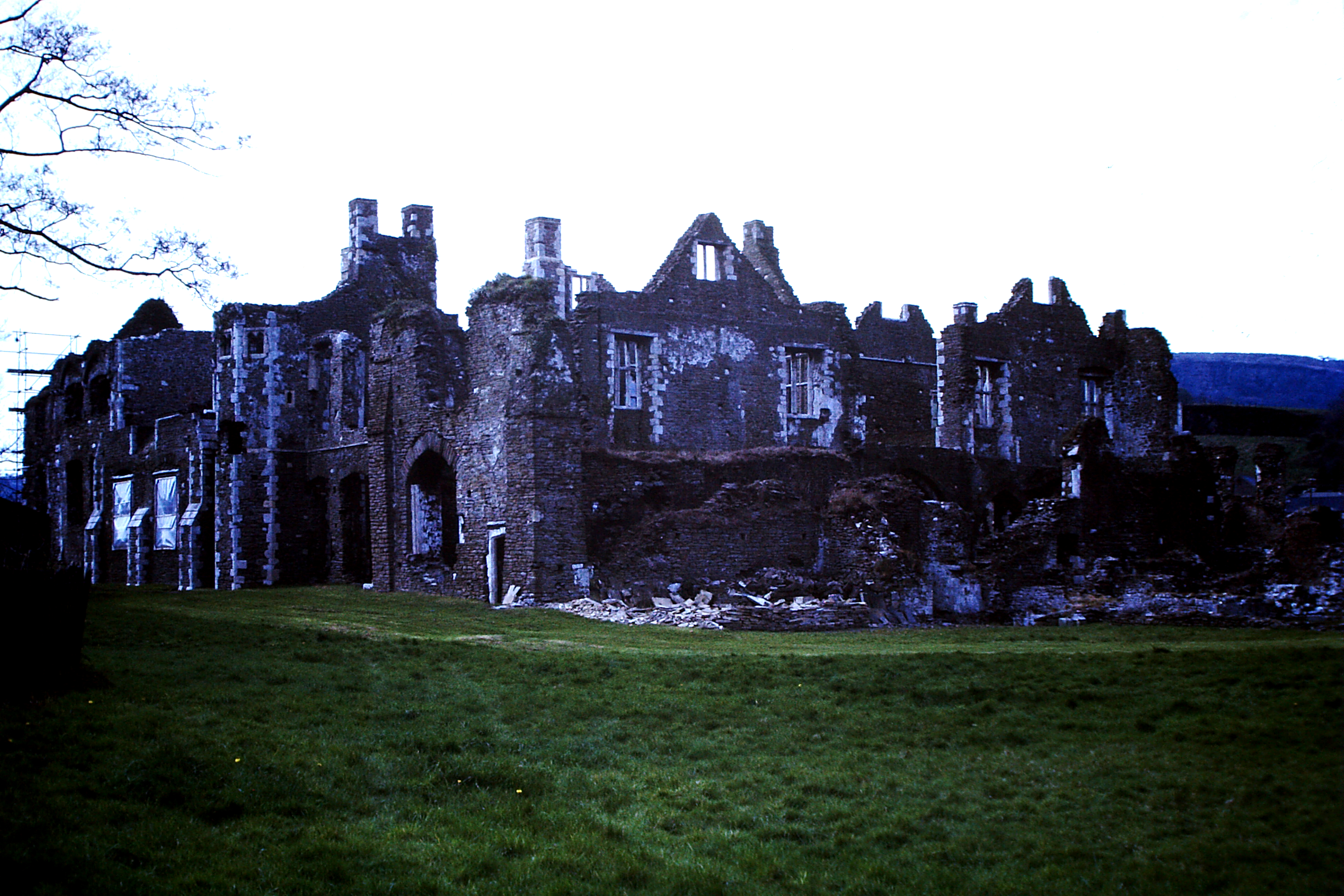
Ruins of Neath Abbey

The archaeology of the abbey was eventually excavated between 1924 and 1935. The Neath Antiquarian Society was the driving force in this early archaeology, in which 7,000 tons of slag and other industrial waste were removed by hand, to uncover the abbey ruins. In 1944 the ownership passed to the Ministry of Works, who undertook further stabilization of the walls. In 2014 Cadw, the successor body charged with the site's care, began a substantial project to further protect and stabilize parts of the ruins. The site is open to the public with some interpretation display boards on site.

== Gatehouse ==
North of the abbey ruins are the remains of the gatehouse which would have controlled access into the abbey precinct. It now stands on New Road alongside the playground of Abbey Primary School. It was originally built around 1130, but the most prominent surviving features, two pointed windows that face onto the road, date from the 13th or 14th century.

== Commercial use ==
A motorcycle speedway track was constructed in 1962 and the Neath Welsh Dragons rode for one year adjacent to the Abbey. The west side of the Abbey was so close to the banking that the Abbey ruins looked as though it formed part of the track.

The area adjacent to the ruins is used by a car retailer and a number of smaller businesses and workshops.

The site has been used to film several episodes of television series Doctor Who. The Time Lord (played by Matt Smith) and his companion Amy Pond (Karen Gillan) have filmed several times at the site, which was transformed into a complete structure.

The site was also used for shots during the filming of the BBC television series Merlin, for example the castle of the ancient kings where Arthur rediscovered the round table in Series 3 episode 13

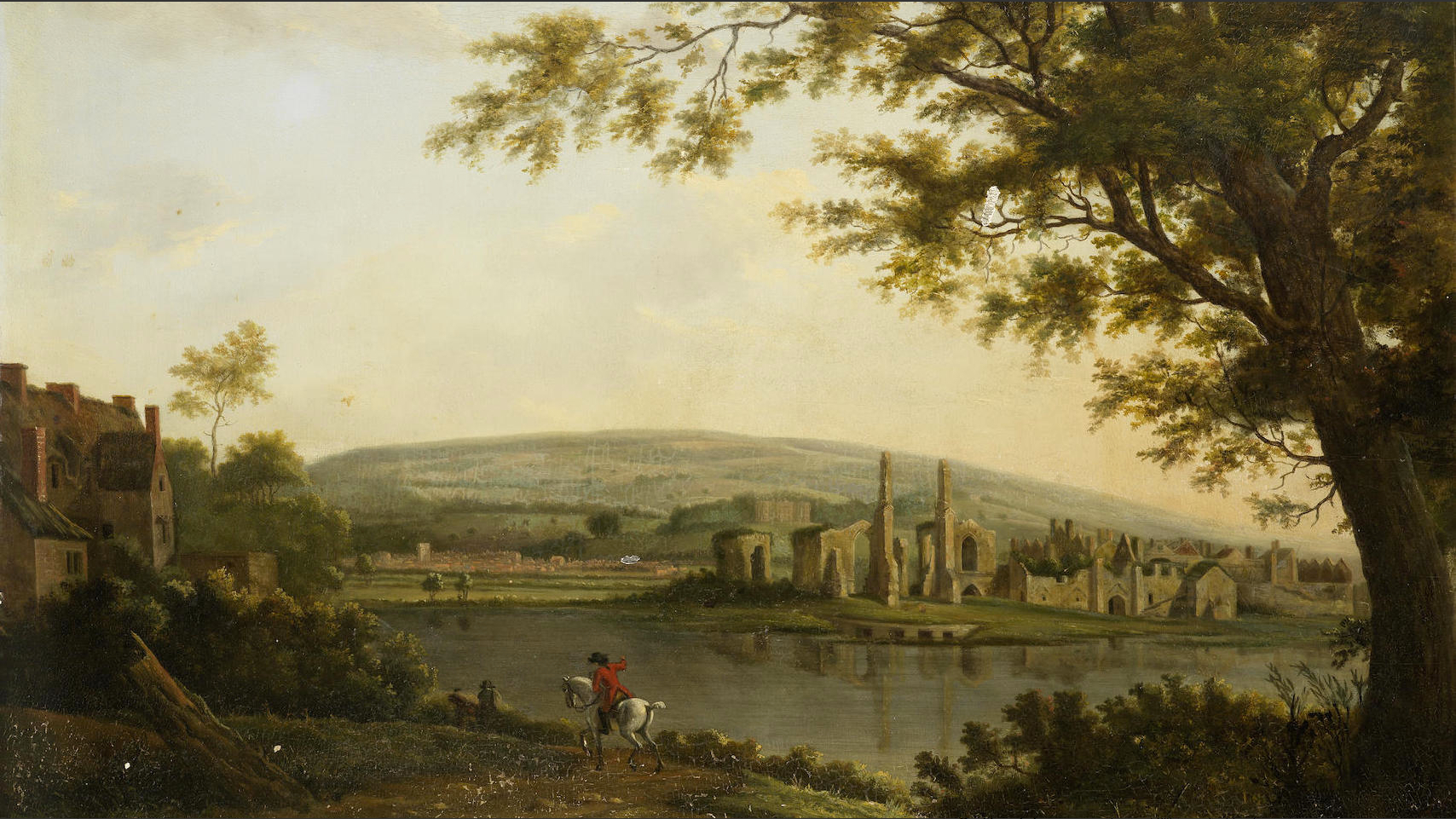
A view of Neath Abbey (c. 1800) by Hendrik Frans de Cort

== Nearest places ==
- Neath
- Bryncoch
- Skewen
- Caewern
- Pontrhydyfen

== See also ==
- Neath (UK Parliament constituency)
- Neath Abbey Castle Class steam locomotive
- List of Scheduled Monuments in Neath Port Talbot
