= David Jones =

David, Dafydd, Dai, Dave, Davy, or Di Jones may refer to:

== People ==
=== Arts and entertainment ===
==== Music ====
- David Bowie (David Robert Jones, 1947–2016), English musician and actor
- Dave Jones (drummer) (active since 1983), drummer with New York band Agnostic Front
- David Jones (jazz musician) (1888–1956), American jazz saxophonist
- David Jones (drummer) (born c.1958), Australian drummer
- David Evan Jones (composer) (born 1946), American composer, pianist, and educator
- David Lynn Jones (born 1950), American country music singer-songwriter
- Davy Jones (musician) (1945–2012), English musician and member of The Monkees

==== Other uses in arts and entertainment ====
- Banksy, pseudonymous English artist who allegedly at one time was legally named David Jones
- David Jones (director) (1934–2008), English stage, television and film director
- David Jones (presenter), English sports broadcaster on Sky Sports since 1999
- David Jones (artist-poet) (1895–1974), British modernist poet, writer, and artist
- David Jones (programmer) (active in 1980s), former freelance computer game programmer
- David Jones (video game developer) (born 1966), Scottish video game programmer and entrepreneur
- David Jones (writer), creator of the television series Fireman Sam
- Dai Jones (David John Jones, 1943–2022), Welsh television presenter and radio broadcaster
- David Annwn Jones (born 1953), Anglo-Welsh poet, critic and teacher
- David Elwyn Jones (1945–2003), Welsh writer, politician, and poet
- David R. Jones (journalist) (born 1931 or 1932), American journalist, winner of two Gerald Loeb Awards
- David R. Jones (biologist) (1941–2010), British-born biologist, moved to Canada in 1969
- David Watkin Jones, Welsh poet, historian and geologist

=== Business ===
- David B. Jones (1848–1923), American president and chairman of the board of directors of the Mineral Point Zinc Company
- David Jones (merchant) (1793–1873), Welsh-Australian department store founder
- David Jones (advertising executive) (born 1966), English born businessman

=== Military ===
- David Jones (VC) (1892–1916), English recipient of the Victoria Cross
- David M. Jones (1913–2008), U.S. Air Force major general, one of Doolittle's Raiders
- David C. Jones (1921–2013), U.S. Air Force general, chairman Joints Chief of Staff
- David Rumph Jones (1825–1863), Confederate general

=== Politics ===
==== Canada ====
- David Jones (Upper Canada politician) (1792–1870), lawyer, judge and political figure
- David Ford Jones (1818–1887), Ontario manufacturer and political figure

==== United Kingdom ====
- David Jones (Carmarthenshire MP) (1810–1869), Welsh banker and Conservative Party politician
- David Jones (Clwyd West MP) (born 1952), Conservative Party MP, former AM and Welsh Secretary
- D. T. Jones (David Thomas Jones, 1899–1963), Labour Party Member of Parliament for Hartlepool, 1945–1959
- David Brynmor Jones (1851–1921), barrister, historian and Liberal Member of Parliament

==== United States ====
- David C. Jones (1921–2013), chairman of the Joint Chiefs of Staff
- David W. Jones (1815–1879), secretary of state of Wisconsin
- David P. Jones (1860–1927), two-time mayor of Minneapolis, Minnesota
- Dave Jones (politician) (born 1962), California insurance commissioner
- J. David Jones, member of the Illinois House of Representatives

==== Elsewhere ====
- David Jones (New Zealand politician) (1873–1941), New Zealand politician
- David Jones (Guernsey politician) (1949–2016), Minister of Housing in Guernsey, Channel Islands
- David Ivon Jones (1883–1924), Welsh Communist, newspaper editor, and political prisoner in South Africa

=== Religion ===
- David Jones (Llangan) (1736–1810), Welsh Church of England priest who was supportive of Methodism
- David Jones (missionary) (1796–1841), Welsh missionary in Madagascar
- David Bevan Jones (1807–1863), Welsh Baptist minister
- David Evan Jones (missionary) (1870–1947), Welsh missionary in Mizoram, India
- David Jones (Dean of Llandaff) (1870–1949), Dean of Llandaff Cathedral
- David Jones (archdeacon of Carmarthen) (1874–1950), Archdeacon of Carmarthen
- David Colin Jones (born 1943), American bishop

=== Science, engineering and academia ===
- David A. Jones (active since 1995), head of the National Climate Centre at the Australian Bureau of Meteorology
- David Dallas Jones (1887–1956), president of Bennett College in Greensboro, North Carolina and brother of Robert Elijah Jones
- David E. H. Jones (1938–2017), best known as Daedalus, British writer and scientist
- David James Jones (1886–1947), Welsh philosopher and academic
- David Lewis Jones (1945–2010), Welsh historian and librarian
- David L. Jones (botanist) (born 1944), Australian horticultural botanist
- David L. Jones (video blogger) (active since 2009), Australian electronic engineer and blogger
- David Wyn Jones (born 1950), British musicologist
- David R. Jones (biologist) (1941–2010), recipient of Flavelle Medal
- David T. Jones (scientist) (David Tudor Jones, born 1966), professor of bioinformatics

=== Sports ===
==== American football ====
- David Jones (Browns owner), majority owner of the Cleveland Browns from 1953 to 1961
- David Jones (Cardinals owner) (1883–1966), American football team owner for the Chicago Cardinals
- David Jones (cornerback) (born 1985), American football player
- David Jones (offensive lineman) (born 1961), American football player for the Washington Redskins
- David Jones (safety) (born 1993), American football player; see 2017 New England Patriots season
- David Jones (tight end) (born 1968), American football player for the Los Angeles Raiders
- Dave Jones (American football) (born 1947), American football player
- Deacon Jones (David D. Jones, 1938–2013), American football player

==== Association football ====
- Di Jones (1866–1902), Welsh footballer
- David Jones (footballer, born 1910) (1910–1971), Welsh international footballer
- David Jones (football defender, born 1914) (1914–1988), Welsh footballer
- David Jones (football goalkeeper, born 1914) (1914–1999), Welsh footballer
- Davy Jones (footballer, born 1914), 1914-1998, English footballer for Bury, see 1945–46 Rochdale A.F.C. season
- Dave Jones (footballer, born 1932) (1932–2022), Welsh football goalkeeper
- David Jones (footballer, born 1935) (1935–2014), English footballer
- David Jones (footballer, born 1936), Welsh footballer
- David Jones (footballer, born 1940) (1940–2013), English footballer
- Dai Jones (footballer, born 1941), Welsh footballer
- David Jones (footballer, born 1950), English footballer for York City
- David Jones (footballer, born 1952), Welsh international footballer
- David Jones (footballer, born 1954), English footballer, played and managed in the Faroe Islands, see Template:Faroe Islands Premier League top scorers
- David Jones (soccer, born 1955), Australian association footballer
- Dave Jones (footballer, born 1956), English footballer and manager
- David Jones (footballer, born 1964), English footballer
- David Jones (footballer, born 1984), English footballer

==== Rugby ====
- David Jones (rugby, born 1881) (1881–1933), rugby union and rugby league footballer
- David Phillips Jones (1881–1936), rugby union footballer
- David Jones (rugby, born 1900) (1900–1968), rugby union and rugby league footballer of the 1920s
- David Jones (Welsh rugby), rugby league footballer of the 1960s
- Dafydd Jones (born 1979), rugby union footballer for Wales, and (Llanelli) Scarlets

==== Other sports ====
- David Jones (baseball) (1861–1937), American professional baseball player
- David Jones (runner) (1940–2023), British sprinter and Olympic bronze medallist
- David Jones (darts player) (1949–1995), Welsh darts player
- David Jones (ice hockey) (born 1984), Canadian ice hockey player for the Minnesota Wild
- David Jones (golfer) (born 1947), Northern Irish professional golfer
- David Jones (cricketer, born 1914) (1914–1998), English cricketer
- David Jones (cricketer, born 1920) (1920–1990), Welsh cricketer
- David Jones (sailor) (born 1940), sailor from US Virgin Islands
- David Jones (sport shooter) (born 1977), Australian sports shooter
- Dai St. John (David Jones, 1879–1899), Welsh heavyweight boxer
- David R. Jones (golfer), English golfer and winner of the 1991 Zambia Open
- David Jones (table tennis), English table tennis player
- Dave Jones (volleyball) (born 1959), Canadian volleyball player
- David Jones (basketball) (born 2001), basketball player from the Dominican Republic
- David N. Jones Jr American tennis player active in 1930s competed at US Open

=== Other people ===
- David Jones (barrister) (1765–1816), Welsh barrister
- David Jones (railway) (1834–1906), locomotive superintendent of the Highland Railway in Scotland
- David M. Jones (c. 2019), American immigration judge
- David R. Jones (organizer) (1938–1998), Charles Edison Memorial Youth Fund co-founder
- David R. Jones (architect) (1832–1915), Welsh-American architect and poet
- David Lloyd Jones (architect) (1942–1997), in London
- David Lloyd Jones, Lord Lloyd-Jones (born 1952), British Supreme Court judge
- David Thomas Jones (administrator) (1866–1931), British administrator and author
- David Jones (died 1872), lynching victim
- David Butler-Jones, Canadian physician, first Chief Public Health Officer of Canada
- David Jones (YouTuber), New Zealand YouTuber

== Other uses ==
- David Robert Jones (Fringe), fictional character of the science-fiction television series
- David Jones (department store) (founded 1838), a chain of department stores in Australia
- David Jones (album), 1965, by Davy Jones

== See also ==
- David Robert Jones (disambiguation)
- Davy Jones (disambiguation)
- David Rhys-Jones (born 1962), former Australian rules footballer
- Dafydd Jones (disambiguation)
