= Dafydd Jones (disambiguation) =

Dafydd Jones is a Welsh rugby union player.

Dafydd Jones may also refer to:

- Dafydd Jones (footballer), Welsh footballer
- Dafydd Jones (Dewi Dywyll), Welsh balladeer
- Dafydd Glyn Jones, Welsh scholar and lexicographer
- Dafydd Jones (Dafydd Jones o Drefriw) on List of Welsh-language authors
- Dafydd Jones (Isfoel) on List of Welsh-language authors
- Dafydd Jones (hymn writer) on List of Welsh-language authors
- Dafydd Jones (hymnist) from Caio, Carmarthenshire
- Dafydd Jones (poet) on List of Welsh-language authors

== See also ==
- David Jones (disambiguation)
