= Davy Jones' Locker (disambiguation) =

Davy Jones's locker is a nautical idiom meaning "the bottom of the sea".

Davy Jones' Locker may also refer to:

== Music ==
- Davy Jones' Locker, a 1999 album by The Ocean Blue
- "Davy Jones Locker", a song by Buckethead from the 2002 album Bermuda Triangle
- "Davy Jones' Locker", a song by Panda Bear from the 2015 album Panda Bear Meets the Grim Reaper

== Other uses ==
- Davey Jones's Locker, a fictional location in Pirates of the Caribbean, a Disney film series; see List of locations in Pirates of the Caribbean
- Davy Jones' Locker (film), a Willie Whopper cartoon
- Operation Davy Jones' Locker, a U.S. military operation disposing of captured German chemical weapons after World War II

== See also ==
- Davy Jones (disambiguation)
