= List of Welsh-language authors =

This is a list of Welsh-language authors.

== A ==
- Richard Ithamar Aaron (1901–1987)
- William Ambrose (Emrys) (1813–1873)
- Gwynn ap Gwilym (1950–2016)
- Charles Ashton (1848–1898)

== B ==
- William Ambrose Bebb (1894–1953)
- Thomas Benjamin (poet) (1850-1925)
- Tom Beynon (1886–1961)
- John Blackwell (Alun) (1797–1841)
- Käthe Bosse-Griffiths (1910–1998)
- David James Bowen (1925–2017)
- Euros Bowen (1904–1988)
- Geraint Bowen (1915–2011)
- Siôn Bradford (1706–1785)
- Robert Bryan (1858–1920)

== C ==
- Rhys Cadwaladr (fl. 1666–1690)
- David Charles (1762–1834)
- Thomas Charles (1755–1814)
- Irma Chilton (1930–1990)
- Morys Clynnog (1525–1581)

== D ==
- Aneirin Talfan Davies (1909–1980)
- Edward Tegla Davies (1880–1967)
- Gareth Alban Davies (1926–2009)
- Grahame Davies (born 1964)
- James Kitchener Davies (1902–1952)
- John Davies (Dr John Davies, Mallwyd) (c. 1567–1644)
- John Cadvan Davies (1846–1923)
- John Humphreys Davies (1871–1926)
- Lewis Davies (1863–1951)
- Pennar Davies (1911–1996)
- Richard Davies (c. 1501–1581)
- Richard Davies (Mynyddog) (1833–1877)
- Thomas Glynne Davies (1926–1988)
- Walter Davies (Gwallter Mechain) (1761–1849)
- Robert Jones Derfel (1824–1905)

== E ==
- Aled Eames (1921–1996)
- Marion Eames (1921–2007)
- David Miall Edwards (1873–1941)
- Hywel Teifi Edwards (1934–2010)
- Lewis Edwards (1809–1887)
- Owen Morgan Edwards (1858–1920)
- Roger Edwards (1811–1886)
- Thomas Edwards (Twm o'r Nant) (1738–1810)
- John Elias (1774–1841)
- Islwyn Ffowc Elis (1924–2004)
- Robert Elis (Cynddelw) (1812–1875)
- Thomas Iorwerth Ellis (1899–1970)
- Beriah Gwynfe Evans (1848–1927)
- Christmas Evans (1776–1838)
- Daniel Evans (Daniel Ddu o Geredigion) (1792–1846)
- Daniel Silvan Evans (1818–1903)
- David Emrys Evans (1891–1966)
- Donald Evans (born 1940)
- Ellis Humphrey Evans (Hedd Wyn) (1887–1917)
- Gwynfor Evans (1912–2005)
- Hugh Evans (1854–1934)
- John Evans (I.D. Ffraid) (1814–1875)
- Theophilus Evans (1693–1767)
- William Evans (Wil Ifan) (1883–1968)
- Albert Evans-Jones (Cynan) (1895–1970)

== G ==
- William Richard Philip George (1912–2006)
- John Gwyn Griffiths (1911–2004)
- Elis Gruffydd (c. 1490 – c. 1552)
- Owen Gruffydd (c. 1643–1730)
- Robert Geraint Gruffydd (1928–2015)
- William John Gruffydd (1881–1954)
- Bethan Gwanas (born 1962)

== H ==
- Joseph Harris (Gomer) (1773–1825)
- Isaac Daniel Hooson (1880–1948)
- Mererid Hopwood (born 1964)
- Hugh Hughes (Y Bardd Coch o Fôn) (1693–1776)
- John Ceiriog Hughes (1832–1887)
- Jonathan Hughes (1721–1805)
- Richard Cyril Hughes (1932–2022)
- Thomas Rowland Hughes (1903–1949)
- Edward Morgan Humphreys (1882–1955)
- Humphrey Humphreys (1648–1712)

== I ==
- Dafydd Ifans (born 1949)

== J ==
- Daniel James (Gwyrosydd) (1848–1920)
- Edward James (c. 1569 – c. 1610)
- Evan James (Ieuan ap Iago) (1809–1878)
- David Jenkins (1912–2002)
- John Jenkins (Gwili) (1872–1936)
- Robert Thomas Jenkins (1881–1969)
- John Thomas Job (1867–1938)
- Bedwyr Lewis Jones (1933–1992)
- Dafydd Jones (Dewi Dywyll) (1803–1868)
- David James Jones (Gwenallt) (1899–1968)
- Elizabeth Watkin-Jones (1888–1966)
- Gwilym Richard Jones (1903–1993)
- Harri Pritchard Jones (1933–2015)
- John Jones (Jac Glan-y-gors) (1766–1821)
- John Jones (Ioan Tegid) (1792–1852)
- John Jones (Talhaiarn) (1810–1869)
- John Jones (Myrddin Fardd) (1836–1921)
- John Robert Jones (1911–1970)
- Lewis Jones (Patagonia) (1897–1939)
- Richard Goodman Jones (Dic Goodman) (1920–2013)
- Robert Ambrose Jones (Emrys ap Iwan) (1848–1906)
- Robert Maynard Jones (Bobi Jones) (1929–2017)
- Thomas Jones (Dinbych) (1756–1820)
- Thomas Gwynn Jones (1871–1949)
- Thomas Llewelyn Jones (1915–2009)
- Morris Kyffin (c. 1555–1598)

== L ==
- Thomas Levi (1825–1916)
- Alun Lewis (1915–1944)
- Gwyneth Lewis
- Henry Lewis (1889–1968)
- Hywel David Lewis (1910–1992)
- Robyn Lewis (1929–2019)
- Saunders Lewis (1893–1985)

== Ll ==
- John Lloyd-Jones (1885–1956)
- Alan Llwyd (born 1948)
- Angharad Llwyd (1780–1866)
- Morgan Llwyd (1619–1659)
- Robin Llywelyn (born 1958)

== M ==
- Dafydd Llwyd Mathau (fl. earlier 17th c.)
- Wiliam Midleton (fl. 1550–1600)
- Gareth Miles (1938–2023)
- Derec Llwyd Morgan (born 1943)
- Elena Puw Morgan (1900–1973)
- Eluned Morgan (1870–1938)
- John Morgan (1688–1733)
- Prys Morgan (born 1937)
- William Morgan (1545–1604)
- Lewis Morris (Llywelyn Ddu o Fôn) (1701–1765)
- Richard Morris (1703–1779)
- John Morris-Jones (1864–1929)

== N ==
- Thomas Evan Nicholas (Niclas y Glais) (1879–1971)

== O ==
- Owain Owain (1929–1993)
- Robin Llwyd ab Owain (born 1959)
- Daniel Owen (1836–1895)
- David Owen (Dewi Wyn o Eifion) (1784–1841)
- David Owen (Brutus) (1795–1866)
- Gerallt Lloyd Owen (1944–2014)
- Goronwy Owen (Goronwy Ddu o Fôn) (1723–1769)
- William David Owen (1874–1925)
- William Owen Pughe (1759–1835)

== P ==
- Gwenlyn Parry (1932–1991)
- John Parry (1776–1851)
- Robert Parry (1540–1612)
- Robert Williams Parry (1884–1956)
- Sarah Winifred Parry (1870-1953)
- Thomas Parry (1904–1985)
- Thomas Herbert Parry-Williams (1887–1975)
- Meirion Pennar (1944–2010)
- John Price (1502–1555)
- Thomas Price (Carnhuanawc) (1787–1848)
- Caradog Prichard (1904–1980)
- Rhys Prichard (Yr Hen Ficer) (1579–1644)
- Edmwnd Prys (1543–1623)
- Gwilym Puw (c. 1618 – c. 1689)

== Ph ==
- Eluned Phillips (1914-2009)

== R ==
- Evan Rees (Dyfed) (1850–1923)
- Ioan Bowen Rees (1929–1999)
- Thomas Rees (1815–1885)
- Thomas Ifor Rees (1890–1977)
- William Rees (Gwilym Hiraethog)
- David Richards (Dafydd Ionawr) (1751–1827)
- Thomas Richards (1878–1962)
- Gruffydd Robert (before 1532 – after 1598)
- Brynley Francis Roberts (1931–2023)
- David Roberts (Dewi Havhesp) (1831–1884)
- Emrys Roberts (1929–2012)
- Kate Roberts (1891–1985)
- Samuel Roberts (writer) (1800–1885)
- Wiliam Owen Roberts (born 1960)
- Dafydd Rowlands (1931–2001)
- John Rowlands (author) (1938–2015)
- William Rowlands (Gwilym Lleyn) (1802–1865)

== Rh ==
- Edward Prosser Rhys (1901–1945)
- Morgan Rhys (1716–1779)
- Siôn Dafydd Rhys (1534 – c. 1609)

== S ==
- William Salesbury (c. 1520 – c. 1584)
- William Saunders (1806–1851)
- Simwnt Fychan (c. 1530–1606)

== T ==
- David Thomas (Dewi Hefin) (1828–1909)
- David Thomas (1880–1967)
- Ebenezer Thomas (Eben Fardd) (1802–1863)
- Gwyn Thomas (1936–2016)
- Robert Thomas (Ap Vychan) (1809–1880)
- Ronald Stuart Thomas (1913–2000)
- William Thomas (Islwyn) (1832–1878)
- William Thomas (Gwilym Marles) (1834–1879)
- Angharad Tomos (born 1958)

== W ==
- Urien Wiliam (1929–2006)
- Colin H Williams (born 1950)
- David John Williams (1885–1970)
- Edward Williams (Iolo Morganwg) (1747–1826)
- Eliseus Williams (Eifion Wyn) (1867–1926)
- Gareth F. Williams (1955–2016)
- Glanmor Williams (1920–2005)
- Griffith Williams (Gutyn Peris) (1769–1838)
- Gwynne Williams (born 1937)
- Ifor Williams (1881–1965)
- John Ellis Williams (1924–2008)
- John Lloyd Williams (1854–1945)
- John Owen Williams (Pedrog) (1892–1973)
- John Richard Williams (J.R. Tryfanwy) (1867–1924)
- Morris Williams (Nicander) (1809–1874)
- Moses Williams (1685–1742)
- Owen Williams (Owen Gwyrfai) (1790–1874)
- Peter Bailey Williams (1763–1836)
- Richard Bryn Williams (1902–1981)
- Richard Hughes Williams (Dic Tryfan) (c. 1878–1919)
- Robert Williams (Robert ap Gwilym Ddu) (1766–1850)
- Robert Williams (Trebor Mai) (1830–1877)
- Robert Dewi Williams (1870–1955)
- Rowland Williams (Hwfa Môn) (1823–1905)
- Rhydwen Williams (1916–1997)
- Thomas Marchant Williams (1845–1914)
- Waldo Williams (1904–1971)
- William Williams (Pantycelyn) (1717–1791)
- William Williams (Caledfryn) (1801–1869)
- William Williams (Creuddynfab) (1814–1869)
- William Williams (Crwys) (1875–1968)
- William Llewelyn Williams (1867–1922)
- Ellis Wynne (1671–1734)
- Eirug Wyn (1950–2004)
