= David Robert Jones =

David Robert Jones may refer to:

- David Bowie (1947–2016), English singer and actor, born and known legally as David Robert Jones
- David R. Jones (biologist) (1941–2010), Anglo‐Canadian zoologist
- David Robert Jones (Fringe), fictional antagonist of the science-fiction television series

== See also ==
- David Jones (disambiguation)
