= St Mary Hill =

Coordinates: 51.497800°N 3.501226°W

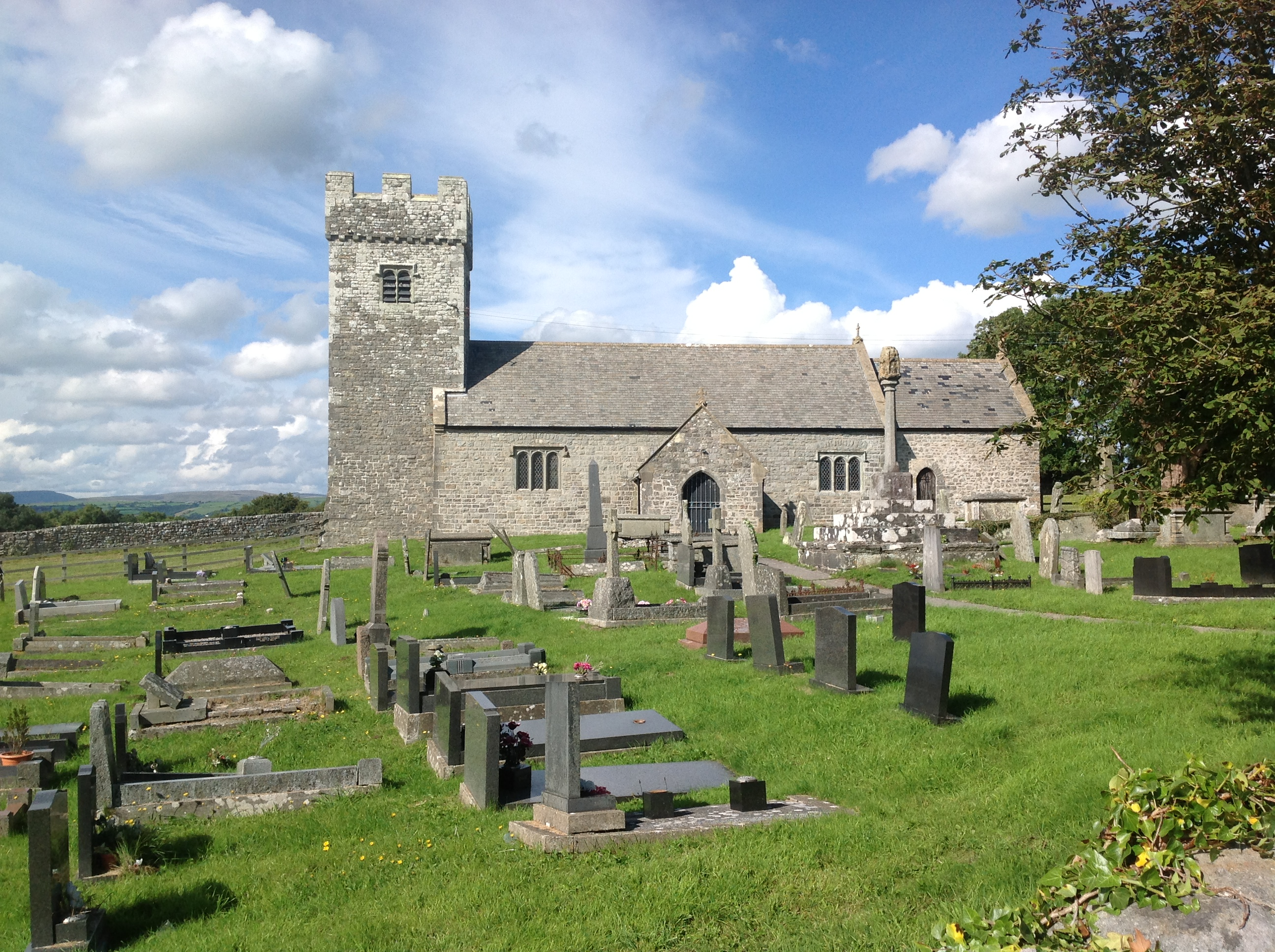
- St Mary's Church

- Location within the Vale of Glamorgan
- OS grid reference: SS958787
- Community: Llangan
- Principal area: Vale of Glamorgan
- Preserved county: South Glamorgan
- Country: Wales
- Sovereign state: United Kingdom
- Post town: Bridgend
- Postcode district: CF35
- Dialling code: 01446
- Police: South Wales
- Fire: South Wales
- Ambulance: Welsh
- UK Parliament: Vale of Glamorgan
- Senedd Cymru – Welsh Parliament: Vale of Glamorgan

St Mary Hill (Welsh: Eglwys Fair Y Mynydd) is a settlement in the Vale of Glamorgan, Wales. It is located approximately 4 miles (6.4 km) north west of the market town of Cowbridge. It is part of the community of Llangan along with Treoes and the village of Llangan itself.

== History ==
In the Middle Ages St Mary Hill was located partly within two manors, Gelligarn and Ruthin. Gelligarn, known historically as Kilticar, belonged to the De Alweias (De Haweys) during the 12th century. The De Alweias held the manor under the Le Sores of St Fagans, before it switched ownership to Neath Abbey during the reign of Henry II. The lordship of Ruthin, of which Gelligarn once formed part, contained the medieval parish church, known locally in the Welsh language as Eglwys Fair y Mynydd to distinguish it from a second St Mary Church located in Llanfair, also in the Vale of Glamorgan.

== Bibliography ==
- Price, Aeron (1973). "Llangan, St Mary Hill and Llansannor". In Stewart Williams (ed.). Glamorgan Historian. Vol. III, The Garden of Wales (2nd ed.). Cowbridge: D Brown and sons.
