= Gwynne Williams =

Welsh writer

Gwynne Williams (born 1937) is a Welsh writer of poetry and prose as well as a translator of numerous literary works from English into Welsh.

A strong proponent of Cymraeg, the native language of Wales, Williams has been writing since the 1950s, with several volumes in print, including Rhwng gewyn ac asgwrn (1969), Gwreichion (three editions between 1973 and 1991) and Pysg (two editions in English and Welsh, 1986). Starting in 1970, he has also translated the works of Jez Alborough, Jan Fearnley, Judy Hindley, Mick Inkpen, Colin McNaughton, Alison Ritchie, Roald Dahl and others, specialising particularly in children's books, with over 35 titles in print. He also has a regular presence at Welsh-language literary events and on BBC's Cardiff-based division, BBC Cymru Wales.

== See also ==
- List of Welsh language authors
