= Davy Jones =

Davy Jones may refer to:

== People ==
- David Jones (jazz musician) (1888–1956), American jazz musician often called Davey Jones
- Davy Jones (baseball) (1880–1972), American baseball player
- Davy Jones (footballer) (1914–1998), English footballer for Bury
- Davy Jones (musician) (1945–2012), English actor and singer of the band The Monkees
- Davy Jones (racing driver) (born 1964), American winner of the 24 Hours of Le Mans in 1996
- Davey Jones (born 1968), English cartoonist with Viz (comics)
- David Jones, birth name of David Bowie (1947–2016)

== Fictional characters ==
- Davy Jones (Pirates of the Caribbean), captain of the Flying Dutchman from the Pirates of the Caribbean film series
- Davy Jones, a figure of nautical folklore best known from the idiom "Davy Jones' Locker"
- Davy Jones, a living wooden whale in John R. Neill's 1942 children's fantasy novel Lucky Bucky in Oz
- Davy D. Jones, a fictional pirate in the manga and anime series One Piece

== Music ==
- Davy Jones (album), a 1971 album by Davy Jones
- "Davy Jones", a song by French singer Nolwenn Leroy on her 2012 album Ô Filles de l'eau

== Other ==
- Davy Jones, official dog of the Seattle Kraken ice hockey team

== See also ==
- David Jones (disambiguation)
- Davy Jones' Locker (disambiguation)
