= Christopher Bassett =

Welsh Methodist cleric (1753–1784)

Christopher Bassett (1753 – 8 February 1784) was a Welsh Methodist cleric.

== Life ==
Bassett was born in Aberthaw, Glamorgan, Wales to Christopher and Alice Bassett, both followers of Howell Harris (one of the leaders of the Welsh Methodist revival). After studying at Cowbridge Grammar School, Bassett went to Jesus College, Oxford, matriculating in 1768. He obtained a B.A. degree in 1772, adding a M.A. degree in 1775. He was ordained by Richard Terrick, the Bishop of London, and was a curate under William Romaine at St Ann Blackfriars in London. However, health problems caused him to return to Wales, where he became successively curate at St. Fagans and Porthkerry in Glamorgan, establishing Methodist societies in both places, and preaching to Methodists throughout South Wales. He travelled to his sister's house in Bristol in 1783 when his health worsened, and he died there of tuberculosis on 8 February 1784. He was buried at St Athan, Glamorgan. Tributes were paid to him by William Williams, Pantycelyn and others, and David Jones of Llangan, wrote a short biography titled 'Llythyr oddiwrth Dafydd ab Ioan y Pererin at Ioan ab Gwilim y Prydydd..., published at Trevecka in 1784.
