= Llangan =

Village in Wales

Llangan: Welsh: Llanganna
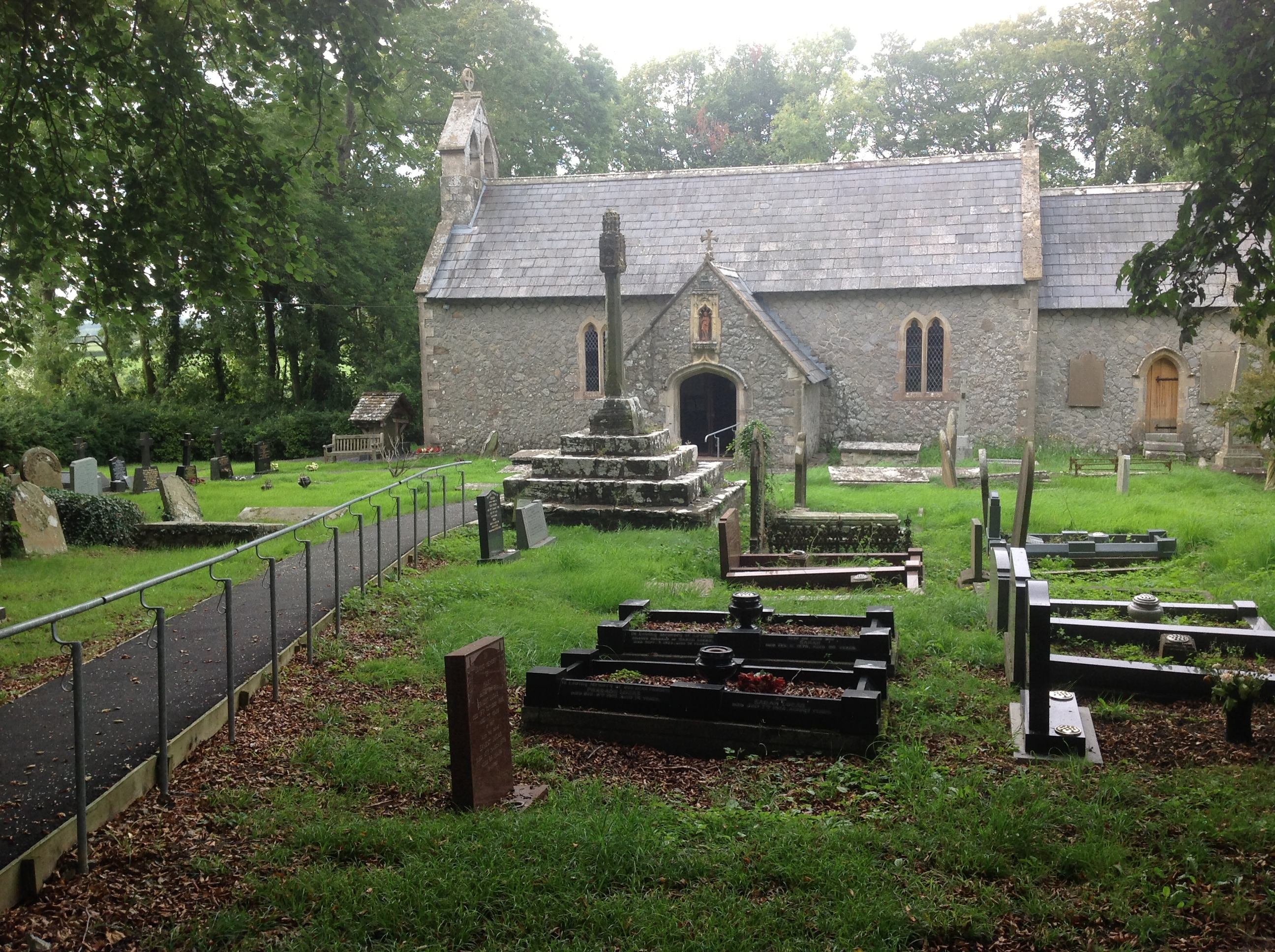
- St Canna's Church, Llangan

- Location within the Vale of Glamorgan
- Population: 702 (2011)
- OS grid reference: SS958775
- Community: Llangan
- Principal area: Vale of Glamorgan
- Preserved county: South Glamorgan
- Country: Wales
- Sovereign state: United Kingdom
- Post town: Bridgend
- Postcode district: CF35
- Dialling code: 01446
- Police: South Wales
- Fire: South Wales
- Ambulance: Welsh
- UK Parliament: Vale of Glamorgan
- Senedd Cymru – Welsh Parliament: Vale of Glamorgan
- List of places UK Wales Vale of Glamorgan 51.487494°N 3.502011°W Map of the community

Llangan (Welsh: Llanganna) is a small village and community in the Vale of Glamorgan, Wales. It is located approximately 4 miles (6.4 km) outside the market town of Cowbridge. As a community it contains the settlements of St Mary Hill, Treoes and Llangan itself. It is in the historic county of Glamorgan.

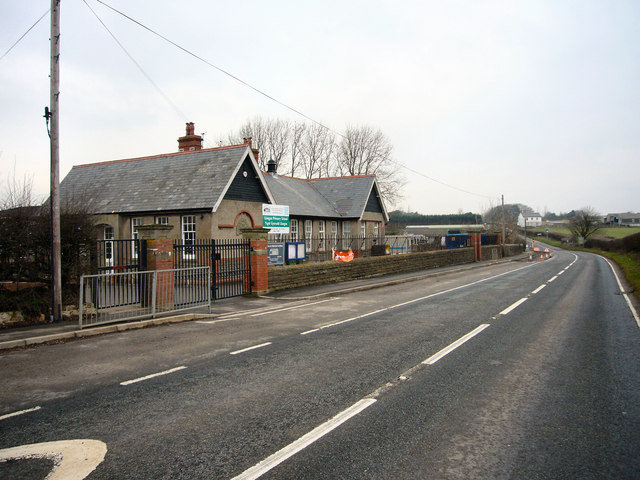
Llangan School

Llangan became an important religious site in the late 18th century due to the work and preaching of its church's vicar David Jones, an early supporter of Calvinistic Methodism in Wales.

== Notable people ==
- Joshua Parry (1719–1776), a Welsh nonconformist minister and writer, born in Llangan.
- David Jones (1736–1810), a Welsh Anglican priest, settled in Llangan in 1767.
- John Prichard (1817–1886), a Welsh architect in the neo-Gothic style, born in Llangan.
- Noel Forbes Humphreys (1890–1918), a Welsh rugby union international, born in Llangan Rectory.
