= Bird wing =

Paired forelimb that allows birds to fly

The skeleton of a bird wing. Places of attachment of various groups of flight feathers are indicated.

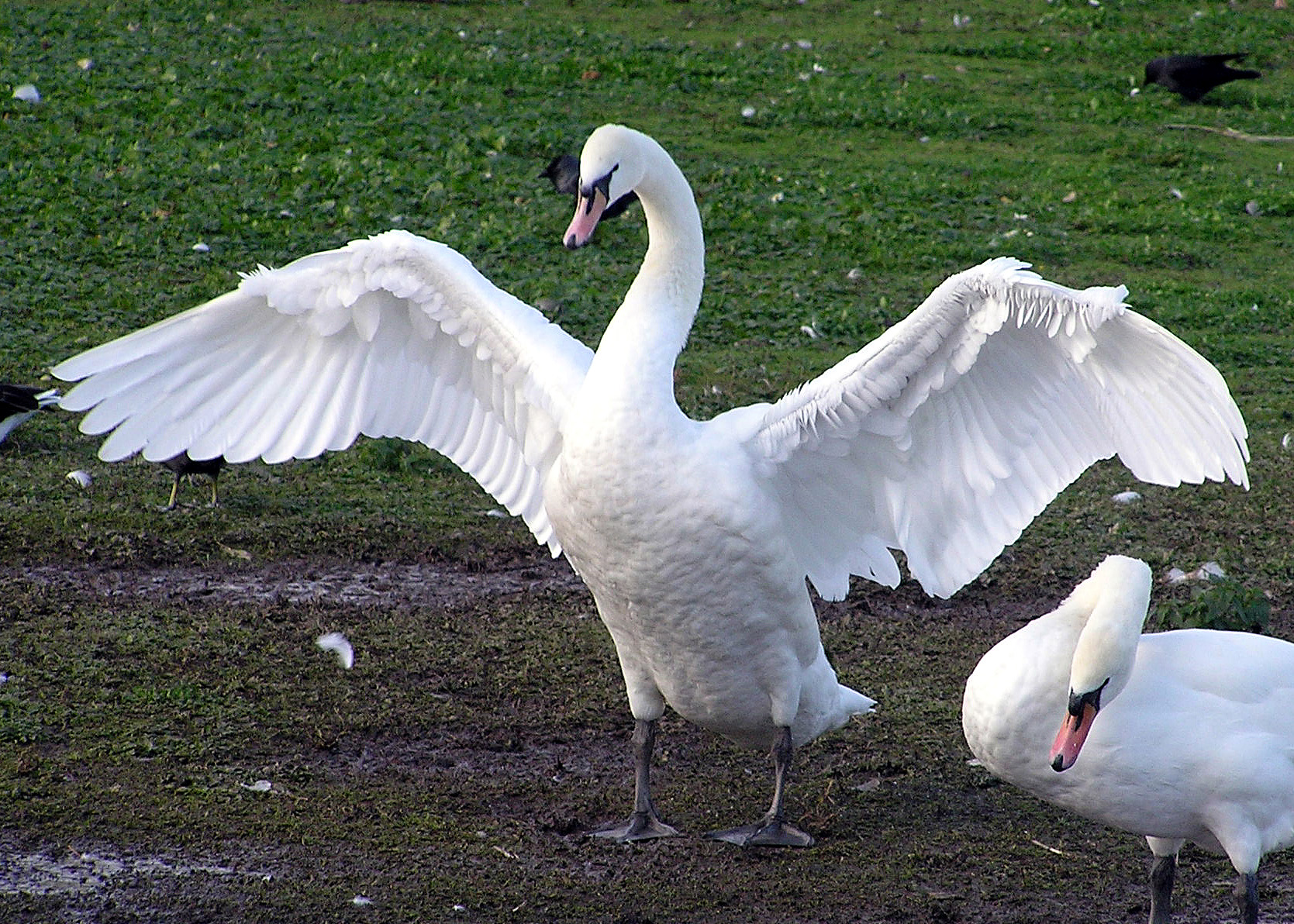
The mute swan with outstretched wings

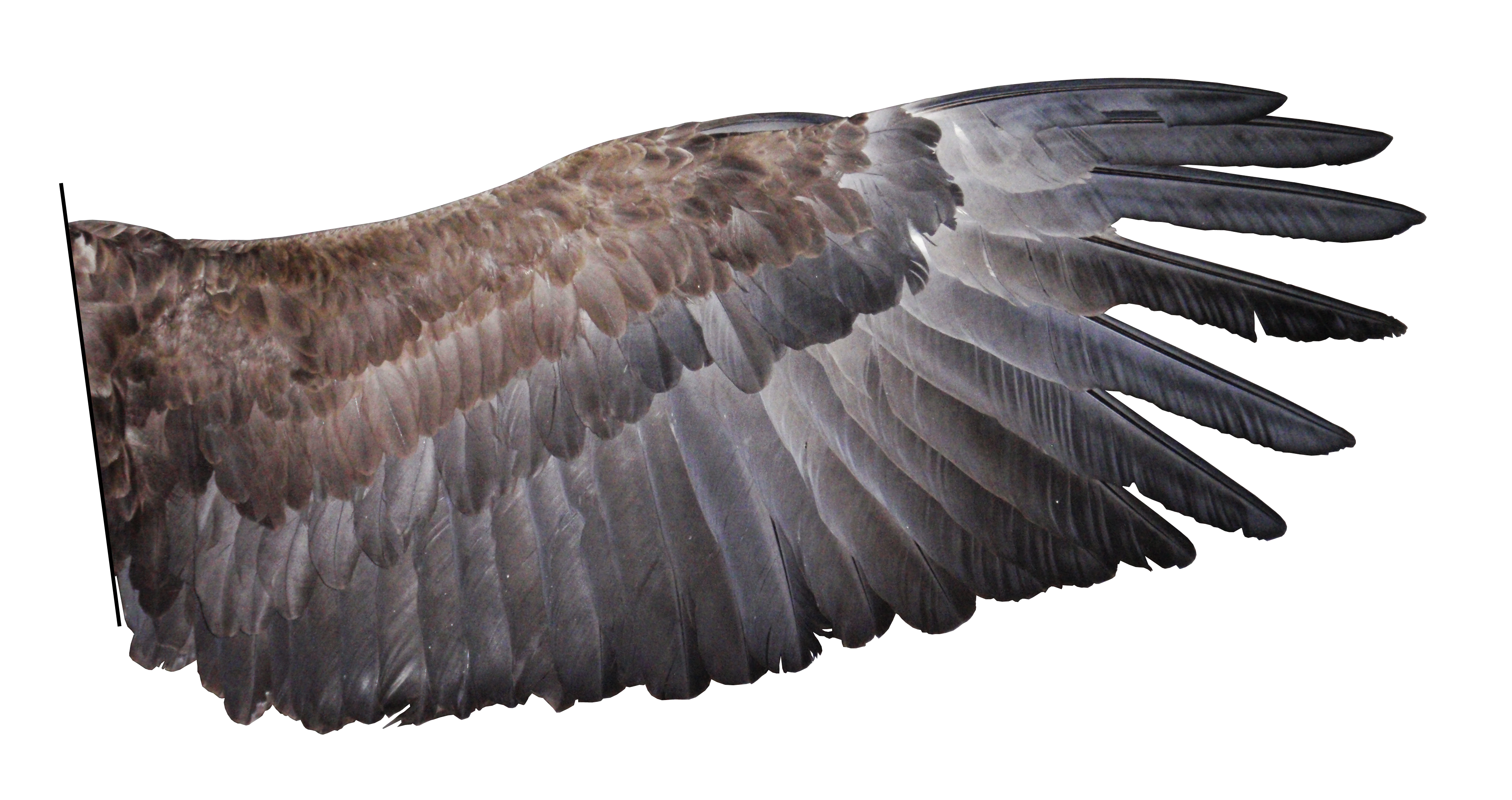
Wing of the white-tailed eagle

Bird wings are paired forelimbs in birds, which evolved specialized feathers to generate lift and thrust and allow the birds to fly.

Terrestrial flightless birds have reduced wings or none at all (for example, moa). In aquatic flightless birds (penguins), wings can serve as flippers.

== Anatomy ==
Like most other tetrapods, the forelimbs of birds consists of the shoulder (with the humerus), the forearm (with the ulna and the radius), and the hand.

The hand of birds is substantially transformed: some of its bones have been reduced, and some others have merged with each other. Three bones of the metacarpus and part of the carpal bones merge into a carpometacarpus. The bones of three fingers are attached to it. The frontmost one bears an alula—a group of feathers that act like the slats of an airplane. Usually, this finger has one phalanx bone, the next has two, and the back has one (but some birds have one more phalanx on the first two fingers—the claw).

=== Finger identity problem ===
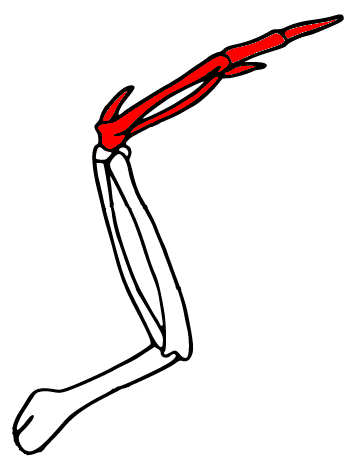
Wing skeleton. Highlighted in red: carpometacarpus and three fingers

The bones of three fingers are preserved in the bird wing. The question of which fingers they are has been discussed for about 150 years, and an extensive literature is devoted to it. The anatomical, paleontological, and molecular data suggests that these are fingers 1–3, but embryological data suggests that these are actually fingers 2–4. Several hypotheses have been proposed to explain this discrepancy. Most likely, in birds, finger buds 2–4 began to follow the genetic program for the development of fingers 1–3.

== Morphology ==
Wing shapes

The shape of the wing is important in determining the flight capabilities of a bird. Different shapes correspond to different trade-offs between advantages such as speed, low energy use, and maneuverability.

Two important parameters are the aspect ratio and wing loading. Aspect ratio is the ratio of wingspan to the mean of its chord (or the square of the wingspan divided by wing area). Wing loading is the ratio of weight to wing area.

Most kinds of bird wings can be grouped into four types, with some falling between two of these types. These types of wings are elliptical wings, high-speed wings, high aspect ratio wings and soaring wings with slots.

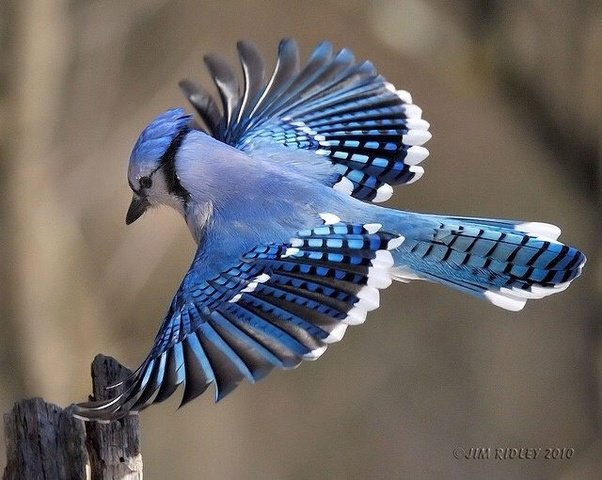
The short and rounded (elliptical) wings of the blue jay are adequate for short flights in densely-vegetated habitats.

=== Elliptical wings ===
Elliptical wings are rounded and short. This type of wing allows for tight maneuvering in confined spaces such as dense vegetation. Elliptical wings are common in forest raptors (such as Accipiter hawks), and many passerines, particularly non-migratory ones (migratory species have longer wings). They are also common in species that use a rapid takeoff to evade predators, such as pheasants and partridges.

=== High speed wings ===
High-speed wings are short, pointed wings that when combined with a heavy wing loading and rapid wingbeats provide an energetically expensive, but high-speed flight. This type of wing is present in fast-flying birds such as ducks. Birds that use their wings to "fly" underwater such as the auks also have small and elongated wings.

The peregrine falcon has the highest recorded dive speed of 242 mph (389 km/h). Peregrine falcons have relatively large wings but they partially close their wings during dives. The fastest straight, powered flight is the spine-tailed swift at 105 mph (170 km/h).

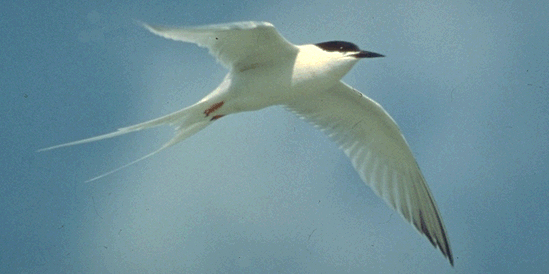
A roseate tern uses its long wings (low wing loading and high aspect ratio) to fly economically for long periods of time.

=== High aspect ratio wings ===
High aspect ratio (elongated) wings confer high flight efficiency for flights of long duration. When combined with a low wing loading, they are used for slow flight. This may take the form of almost hovering (as used by kestrels, terns and nightjars) or in soaring and gliding flight, particularly the dynamic soaring used by seabirds, which takes advantage of wind speed variation at different altitudes (wind shear) above ocean waves to provide lift. Low-speed flight is also important for birds that plunge-dive for fish.

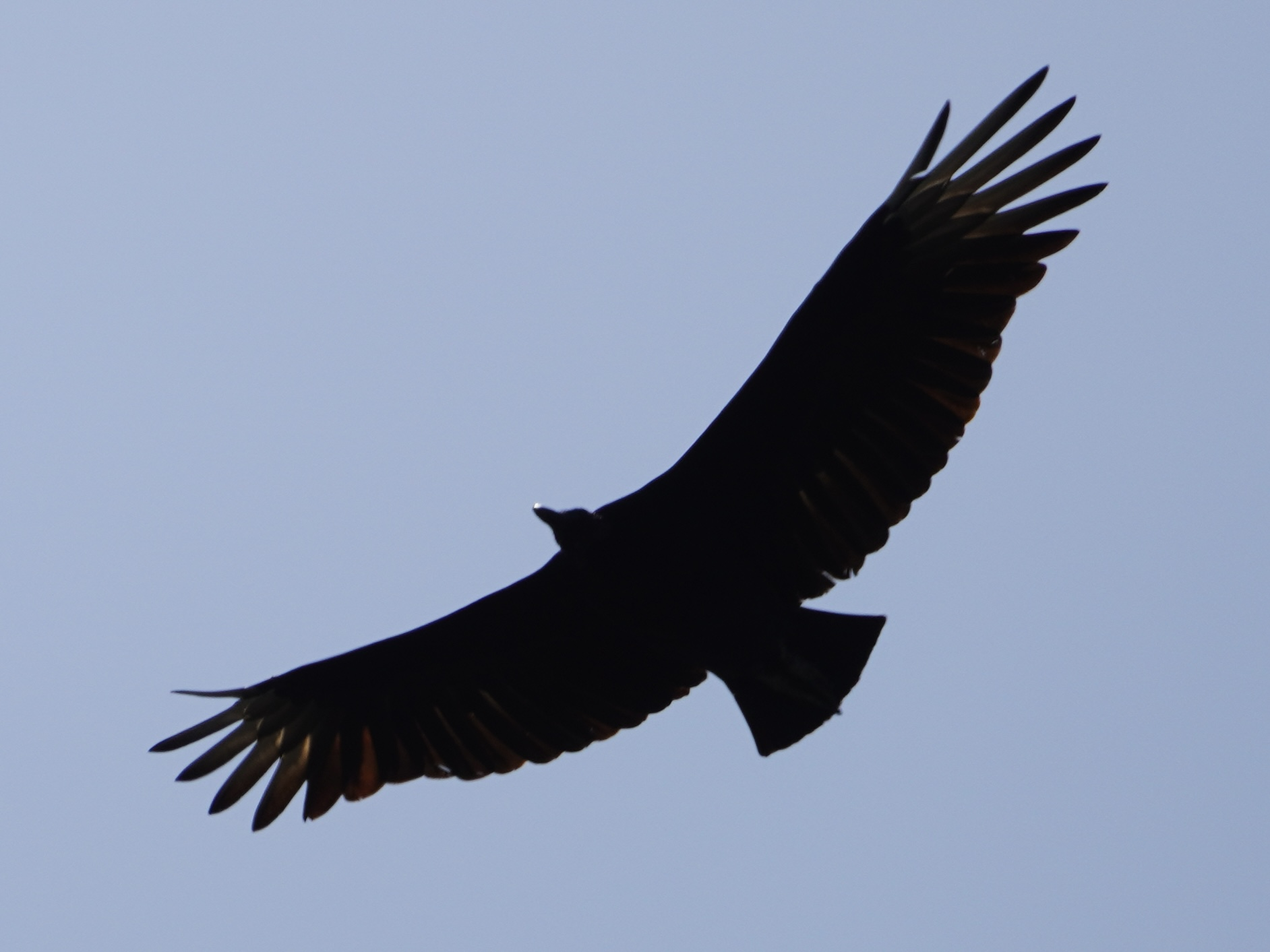
The wings, as those on this black vulture (broad wings with noticeable primaries) are used to soar for long distances to find food: carrion

=== Soaring wings with deep slots ===
These wings are favored by larger species of inland birds, such as eagles, vultures, pelicans, and storks. The slots at the end of the wings, between the primaries, reduce the induced drag and wingtip vortices by "capturing" the energy in air flowing from the lower to upper wing surface at the tips, whilst the shorter size of the wings aids in takeoff (high aspect ratio wings require a long taxi to get airborne).

== Traumatology ==
A wing injury is often crippling for flying birds, preventing them from feeding, socializing, or avoiding predators. In addition to a refusal to fly, bone fractures and other major injuries may present a droop or other unusual positioning of the wing, alongside general distress. Injuries typically require immediate specialized veterinary care, and euthanasia may be considered an ethical option for patients incapable of sustaining themselves due to permanent injury. Amputation and similar surgical operations on injured wings can have severe long-term effects and complications in birds of prey, up to and including death.

Small species like the killdeer take heavy advantage of this perceived vulnerability through the behavior of injury-feigning. A parent patrolling a nest will react to potential predators by vocalizing and presenting one or both wings at an extended angle, simulating a fracture; The predator therefore attempts to attack the healthy parent rather than continue foraging for the eggs or chicks.
