= Whiffling =

Rapid style of descent in bird flight

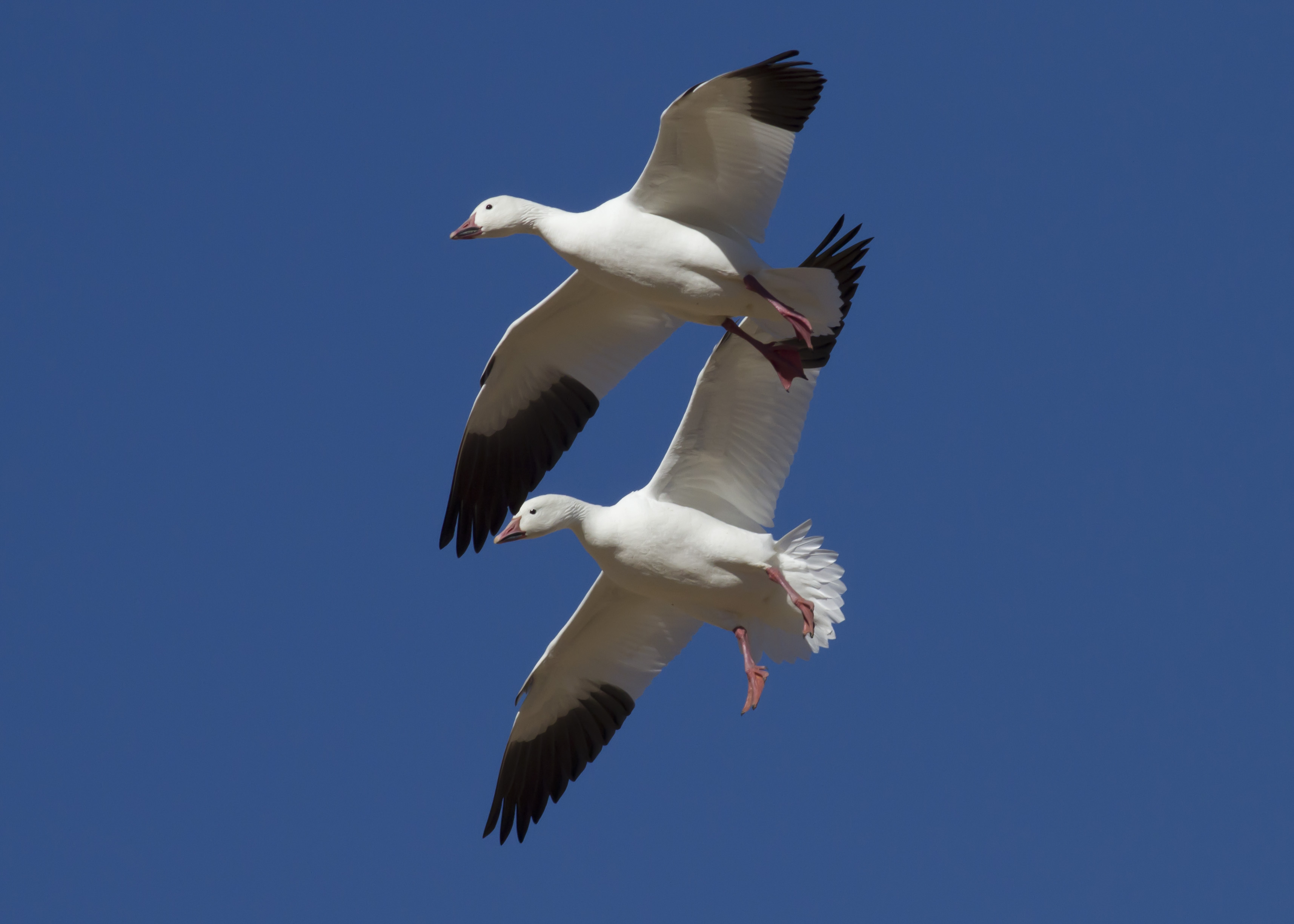
Whiffling is a behaviour some birds perform before landing.

Whiffling is a term used in ornithology to describe the behavior whereby a bird rapidly descends with a zig-zagging, side-slipping motion. Sometimes to whiffle, a bird flies briefly with its body turned upside down but with its neck and head twisted 180 degrees around in a normal position. The aerodynamics which usually give a bird lift during flight are thereby inverted and the bird briefly plummets toward the ground before this is quickly reversed and the bird adopts a normal flying orientation. This erratic motion resembles a falling leaf, and is used to avoid avian predators or may be used by geese (family Anatidae) to avoid a long, slow descent over an area where wildfowling is practised.

The behavior is seen in several species including lesser yellowlegs (Tringa flavipes), the black-tailed godwit (Limosa limosa), the northern lapwing (Vanellus vanellus), geese (e.g., pink-footed goose (Anser brachyrhynchus)), three species of scoter (Melanitta), and other members of the family Anatidae.
