= David Jones (Llangan) =

Welsh Anglican priest (1736–1810)

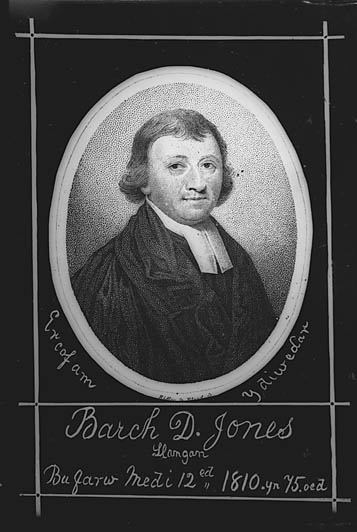
David Jones

David Jones (10 July 1736 – 12 August 1810) was a Welsh Anglican priest, whose sympathy for Methodism saw him become one of the leading religious figures in Wales. When he settled in the village of Llangan in 1767, the congregation, numbered in its hundreds, would come from many miles around to hear him preach and to take communion.

== Life ==
Jones, the son of a farmer, was born in 1736 in the parish of Llanllwni, Carmarthenshire, Wales. He was educated in Carmarthen and took his first curacy at Llanafan Fawr, Breconshire after being ordained by William Lucy, Bishop of St. David's. Not long after he took a post at Lleyn in Caernarvonshire before becoming assistant curate at Tevethin and Caldicot in Monmouthshire. At this later post his outspoken style of preaching made him unpopular with his congregation and he left to accept a curacy over the border in Wiltshire, England.

While at Wiltshire he became known to the Countess of Huntingdon. The Countess, a prominent leader in the English Christian revival, found Jones' passion and noble character impressive, and the two became friends. Through his connection with the Countess he was offered a position at the parish of Llanganna (today known as Llangan) by Lady Charlotte Edwin. On arrival at the village, Jones was unimpressed with the education levels and the morality of his parishioners. He took his position as rector very seriously and over the next few years, the church at Llangan, which before his arrival was almost unheard of, became a hub of the region with people arriving in search of both spiritual guidance and knowledge. Jones set up Bible classes in the surrounding districts, using the local farms as meeting places. On the first Sunday of each month, massive crowds would descend on Llangan from miles around with the churchyard or sometimes nearby barns used to preach from as the church could not hold the numbers.

In 1775 Jones bought a two-acre plot of land to the north in Pencoed and in 1776 erected a Methodist chapel, Salem, on the site. When his first wife, Sinah, died she was buried at Salem. His second marriage saw Jones leave Llangan to live in Manorowen near Fishguard, though he would return monthly to Llangan to preach.

Jones' work at Llangan began a new chapter in Methodism in Glamorgan, and made the village as well known as Llangeitho in Cardiganshire. His work, along with that of Christopher Bassett at St Fagans and Porthkerry and Howel Howells of St Nicholas made the Vale of Glamorgan an important religious region in Wales.
