= David Jones (cricketer, born 1920) =

Welsh cricketer

Personal information
- Full name: David Alfred Jones
- Born: 9 March 1920; Aberkenfig, Glamorgan, Wales
- Died: 18 April 1990 (aged 70); Pen-y-fai, Glamorgan, Wales
- Batting: Right-handed
- Bowling: Right-arm medium

Domestic team information
- Years: Team
- 1938: Glamorgan

Career statistics
Competition	FC
Matches	1
Runs scored	6
Batting average	6.00
100s/50s	–/–
Top score	6
Balls bowled	84
Wickets	2
Bowling average	21.50
5 wickets in innings	–
10 wickets in match	–
Best bowling	2/22
Catches/stumpings	–/–
- Source: Cricinfo, 3 July 2010

David Alfred Jones (9 March 1920 – 18 April 1990) was a Welsh cricketer. Jones was a right-handed batsman who bowled right-arm medium pace. He was born at Aberkenfig, Glamorgan.

Jones made a single first-class appearance for Glamorgan in 1938 against Sir J Cahn's XI at Rodney Parade, Newport. In the match he scored 6 runs in his only first-class innings and took 2/22 with the ball.

Jones died at Pen-y-fai, Glamorgan, on 18 April 1990.
