= David Jones (footballer, born 1950) =

English footballer

Personal information
- Full name: David Hilary Jones
- Date of birth: 29 December 1950 (age 75)
- Place of birth: Bradford, West Riding of Yorkshire, England
- Position: Winger

Senior career*
Years	Team	Apps	(Gls)
1968–1970	Wolverhampton Wanderers	0	(0)
1970	York City	3	(0)
1970–????	Goole Town		
Total		3	(0)
- * Club domestic league appearances and goals

David Hilary Jones (born 29 December 1950) is an English former professional footballer who played as a winger in the Football League for York City, in non-League football for Goole Town, and was on the books of Wolverhampton Wanderers without making a league appearance.
