= William Saunders (poet) =

Welsh language poet and translator

- Born: January 17, 1806 Gwarcwm, Llanllwni, Wales
- Died: June 30, 1851 Llandovery, Carmarthenshire, Wales
- Education: Carmarthen Grammar School
- Genre: Poetry, printing

William Saunders (January 17, 1806 – June 30, 1851) was a poet and writer in Welsh, whose work won prizes at eisteddfodau in Carmarthen and elsewhere. He was a printer by trade.

== Birth and education ==
William Saunders was born on 17 January 1806 at Gwarcwm, Llanllwni, Carmarthenshire, the son of a farmer, Evan Saunders. He went to school in the local village of Castellhywel and then to Carmarthen Grammar School.

After completing school, he became apprenticed to a printer in Carmarthen. He later joined the workforce of Samuel Williams, a printer in Aberystwyth, Cardiganshire.

== Poetry and printing ==
While working in Aberystwyth, Saunders gained prominence for his nature poems and for metrical translations. He won eisteddfod prizes in Carmarthen and other places. His titles included "Y Gwanwyn" (Spring), "Yr Haf" (Summer), "Yr Hydref" (Autumn), "Y Gaeaf" (Winter), "Y Daran" (Clap) and "Y Môr" (The Sea).

In 1830 Saunders moved to the printing and publishing firm of William Rees (1808–1873) in the smaller market town of Llandovery, Carmarthenshire. He continued to work there until his death, on 30 June 1851.

== Namesake ==
Another poet and author named William Saunders, not known to be related to him, wrote in English in the mid-20th century.
