= Operation Davey Jones Locker =

Post World War II military operation

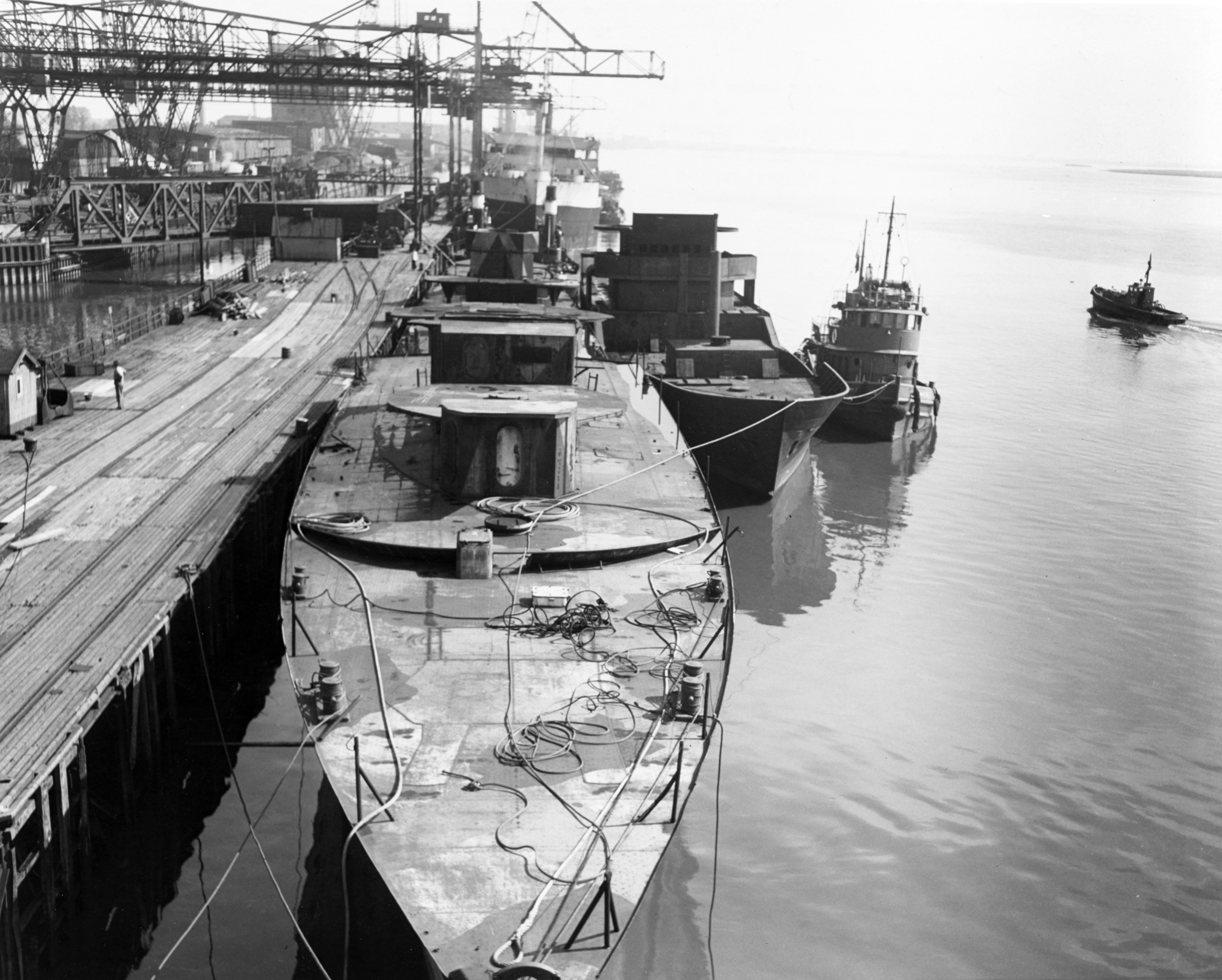
Ex-German ships at the Midgard docks of the Nordenham Sub Port of the 17th major port command, 2 July 1946. They were being loaded with poison gas and were to be scuttled in the North Sea to dispose of this material.

Operation Davy Jones' Locker (or Davey) was a U.K. and U.S. military operation from 1946 to 1948. It involved the dumping at sea of captured German chemical weapons following the end of World War II.

== Background ==
In the aftermath of the Nazi defeat in World War II, the occupying allies found large amounts of stockpiled German chemical weapons. They quickly convened the Continental Committee on Dumping and came to agreement pertaining to the destruction and disposal of the chemical stockpile. The allies decided that each of the four nations would destroy the German weapons, on their occupied territory, in whatever manner was most convenient. A total of 296,103 tons of chemical weapons were found, divided amongst each of the four zones of occupied Germany. The name refers to Davy Jones' Locker, an idiom for the sea bottom.

== Operation ==
The United States undertook Operation Davy Jones' Locker between June 1946 and August 1948, and it involved the scuttling of 38 ships containing between 30,000 and 40,000 tons of captured German chemical weapons. Nine of the ships were scuttled in Skagerrak Strait in the Baltic Sea while two more were sunk in the North Sea. The eleven ships were scuttled over the course of five separate dumpings in the region of Scandinavia.

== See also ==
- Germany and weapons of mass destruction
- Ocean disposal of radioactive waste
- Operation Sandcastle
