= David Watkin Jones =

Welsh poet, historian, and geologist (1832-1905)

Dafydd Morganwg
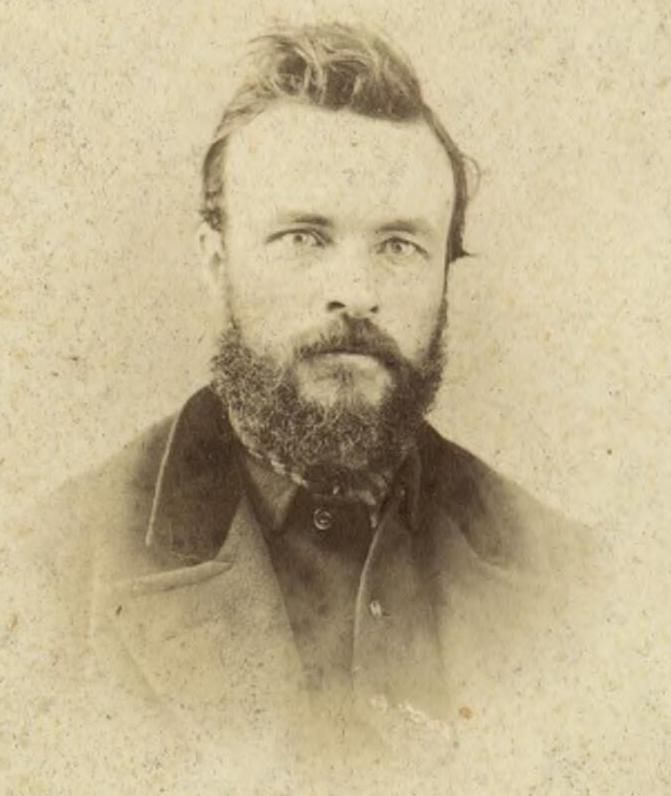
- David Watkin Jones (Dafydd Morganwg) from the National Library of Wales' Welsh Portrait Collection
- Born: David Watkin Jones; 14 February 1832; Merthyr Tydfil, Glamorgan, Wales
- Died: 25 April 1905 (aged 73); Cardiff
- Occupations: Collier, poet, historian and geologist
- Writing career
- Language: Welsh

David Watkin Jones, also known by his bardic name Dafydd Morganwg, was a Welsh poet, historian and geologist. He is remembered as the author of numerous works, especially Yr Ysgol Farddol (The Bardic School), considered by many later poets as the main text for Welsh prosody.

== Early life ==
Born at Merthyr Tydfil to John Jones, a cousin of the poet Daniel Evans (Daniel Ddu o Geredigion), Jones found himself working in coal mines before his 10th birthday. He was offered an education through the Church of England, but declined as it would have seen him taking orders in the Anglican Church. Jones would spend much of his adolescence and youth working underground in the collieries of Hirwaun and Aberdare.

== Eisteddfodau, chapel work and coal industry ==
Jones was still working underground as a fireman when he won his first Eisteddfod prize in 1859. Jones followed this two years later by winning the medal for essay writing at the first National Eisteddfod of Wales in Aberdare, for his early version of Hanes Morganwg (History of Glamorgan). Jones would be a feature of eisteddfodau throughout his life, winning chief Bardic prizes at Machynlleth in 1870, Llanberis in 1878, and Cardiff in 1883. He also became a respected adjudicator of competitions, and was invited to adjudicate at the eisteddfod of the World's Columbian Exposition's in Chicago in 1893.

Following his early literary success, Jones continued to work in the coal industry, serving as coal inspector for Compagnie Générale Transatlantique for more than 30 years. Jones was a Calvinistic Methodist, and became the Deacon of Bethel Chapel in Hirwaun in 1877 and continued to teach at various Sunday Schools until the final weeks of his life.

== Later years at Cardiff ==
Jones became the first president of the Cardiff Cymmrodorion Society in 1888. Jones had already contributed numerous articles to magazines such as Y Geninen, and Cymru, but his move to Cardiff saw him become the editor of Welsh poetry columns for the Cardiff Times and Y Darian (The Shield), as well as the editor of a Welsh Column for the South Wales Weekly News.

Jones commitment to publishing was further evidenced when he opened a book shop in Treharris Street, Roath. The shop housed a small printing press which printed both his own work and that of his friends. Jones was asked to adjudicate the awdl competition in the 1901 National Eisteddfod at Merthyr Tydfil, which would prove to be his last, Jones died at Cardiff, on 25 April 1905 and was buried at Aberdare Cemetery.

== Notable works and influence ==
=== Yr Ysgol Farddol ===
Jones' most popular work, Yr Ysgol Farddol (The Bardic School) was published in 1869. Jones intended the book to be a simplified guide to composing Welsh poetry and the Cerdd dafod, using a "questions and answers" device between a pupil and his teacher. The book was immediately popular, and high demand saw the text republished four times in Jones' lifetime. The book also won praise for the simplicity and clarity of its style, and was considered by many as the main instructive text for Welsh poetic grammar and Prosody.

Together with Jones' Welsh grammar book Yr Ysgol Gymreig (The Welsh School), the work would see Jones remembered as a mentor figure to later poets such as Lewis Davies. However, the book also received criticism, particularly its emphasis on the works of Iolo Morganwg, a writer accused of forging his sources.

=== Hanes Morganwg ===
In 1861 Jones' won a medal at the first National Eisteddfod of Wales at Aberdare for an essay entitled Hanes Morganwg (History of Glamorgan). The success of this short text would inspire Jones to research and publish a greater work under the same title.

The final work would not be published until 1874, as Jones' spent many years travelling around Glamorgan "in depth, twice, in order to see the objects described". Despite its long and arduous development, the book is still considered the definitive early Victorian account of Glamorgan.
