= David R. Jones (biologist) =

British-Canadian biologist (1941–2010)

David Jones
- Born: 28 January 1941; Bristol, England
- Died: 19 November 2010 (aged 69)
- Education: University of Southampton (BSc); University of East Anglia (PhD)
- Scientific career
- Workplaces: University of Bristol; University of British Columbia
- Thesis: The cardiovascular adjustments to submergence in amphibians (1965)

David Robert Jones, CM FRSC (28 January 1941 – 19 November 2010) was a British-born zoologist and biologist.

He was educated at Bristol Cathedral School, the University of Southampton (BSc) and the University of East Anglia (PhD, 1965) He then worked at the University of Bristol.

In 1969 he joined the Zoology Department of the University of British Columbia where he spent the remainder of his career, ultimately becoming a Killam Research Scholar and Professor Emeritus. During his career he was awarded the Fry Medal of the Canadian Society of Zoologists, the Killam Research Prize, the Flavelle Medal of the Royal Society of Canada, Fellowship of the Royal Society of Canada, and the Order of Canada.

Some of Jones' innovations were described by the Journal of Experimental Biology: "He was the first to identify and clearly define the role of nasal receptors, chemoreceptors and baroreceptors in diving responses. Indeed, he was the first to demonstrate the existence of baroreceptors in non-mammalian vertebrates. He was the first to obtain recordings of heart rate and blood pressure during flight in birds. He pioneered the application of wave transmission theory to cardiovascular systems in non-mammalian vertebrates. He had a pioneering role in demonstrating the functions of the central nervous system (cognition) and the endocrine system (particularly the catecholamines) in simulated versus voluntary diving in birds and mammals. Dave was also amongst the first to apply NMR technology and microprocessor-controlled real-time monitoring of physiological variables to diving studies".
