= David Jones (football defender, born 1914) =

Welsh footballer

Dai Jones
Personal information
- Full name: David Gwilym Jones
- Date of birth: 10 June 1914
- Place of birth: Ynysddu, Wales
- Date of death: 30 May 1988 (aged 73)
- Height: 1.80 m (5 ft 11 in)
- Position: Defender

Senior career*
Years	Team	Apps	(Gls)
1934–1935	Cardiff City	9	(0)
1935–1936	Newport County	15	(1)
1936–1937	Wigan Athletic		
1937–1938	Manchester United	1	(0)
1938–1939	Swindon Town	15	(0)
- * Club domestic league appearances and goals

David Gwilym Jones (10 June 1914 – 30 May 1988) was a Welsh footballer. His regular position was as a defender. He was born in Ynysddu. He played for Cardiff City, Newport County, Manchester United, Wigan Athletic, and Swindon Town.
