= Lynching of David Jones =

African American man who was lynched in the U.S.

- Location: Public Square, Nashville, Tennessee, U.S.
- Date: March 25, 1872; 154 years ago 9pm
- Attack type: Lynching
- Victim: David Jones

David Jones was an African-American man who was lynched in Nashville, Tennessee on March 25, 1872, after being arrested as a suspect in a killing. He was mortally wounded while in jail, shot twice in the back while resisting white mob members who came to take him out; the whites pulled him into the Public Square and hanged him from a post outside the police station, with a crowd of an estimated 2,000 in attendance. The sheriff interrupted the hanging and took Jones down. Taken back to the jail, Jones died of his injuries on April 9, 1872.

== Lynching ==
David Jones, an African-American man, was accused of murdering white man Henry Murray, who died in March 1872. Jones was arrested and taken to the county jail in Nashville.

At 7pm on March 25, 1872, a mob met outside the Maxwell House Hotel in Downtown Nashville. By 9pm, they walked to the jail, where they broke into Jones's cell, shot him twice when he resisted, and put a halter around his head. They took him to the public square and hanged him on the gas post outside the police station. A crowd of 2,000 onlookers surrounded Jones. Sheriff Donaldson interrupted the hanging, taking Jones down from the post and carrying him back to the police station. The crowd dispersed at 10pm.

Former Nashville mayor and Tennessee representative Major Richard Boone Cheatham asked the crowd to go home, and Nashville Mayor Kindred Jenkins Morris and Governor John C. Brown made their way to the scene. Governor Brown ordered a detachment of federal troops from Ash Barracks to act as a posse under the mayor's direction, and vowed to prosecute the lynchers. Jones was mortally wounded from the gunshots, and died of his injuries several days later on April 9, 1872.

The Nashville Union and American suggested the lynching was perpetrated by "twenty or more negroes." The Chicago Tribune said the lynchers were thought to be "railroad men." After Jones died, in April 1872 Governor Brown offered a reward of $500 to anyone able to identify the lynchers.

== Legacy ==
In June 2019 David Jones is to be acknowledged by his name on a memorial in downtown Nashville as a victim of lynching in 1872. A metropolitan coalition known as "We Remember Nashville," together with the Equal Justice Initiative, plans events and education that week related to the four cases of lynching in the city in the late 19th century.
