= David Jones (cricketer, born 1914) =

English cricketer

Personal information
- Full name: David Jones
- Born: 9 April 1914; Hodthorpe, Bolsover, Derbyshire, England
- Died: 28 July 1998 (aged 84); Scarborough, Yorkshire, England
- Batting: Right-handed
- Bowling: Fast medium

Domestic team information
- Years: Team
- 1935–1939: Nottinghamshire

Career statistics
Competition	First-class
Matches	24
Runs scored	594
Batting average	18.00
100s/50s	–/3
Top score	60
Balls bowled	240
Wickets	26
Bowling average	5.20
5 wickets in innings	–
10 wickets in match	–
Best bowling	4/26
Catches/stumpings	15/–
- Source: Cricinfo, 6 November 2011

David Jones (9 April 1914 – 28 July 1998) was an English cricketer. Jones was a right-handed batsman with a bowling style of fast medium. He was born at Hodthorpe, Bolsover, Derbyshire.

Jones made his first-class debut for Nottinghamshire against Yorkshire in 1935 County Championship. He made 23 further first-class appearances for the county, the last of which came against Derbyshire in the 1939 County Championship. In his 24 first-class appearances, he scored 594 runs at an average of 18.00, with a high score of 60. This score, which was one of two fifties he made, came against Worcestershire in 1938. He took a single first-class wicket, that of Somerset captain Bunty Longrigg.

He died at Scarborough, Yorkshire on 28 July 1998.
