= David Elwyn Jones =

Welsh writer, politician and poet (1945 - 2003)

David Elwyn Jones (3 July 1945 – 16 April 2003), more well known as D. Elwyn Jones or simply Elwyn Jones, was a Welsh writer, politician, and poet. He was born into a Welsh-speaking family in Tremadog and initially pursued work in the ministry, obtaining a diploma in theology from the Bala-Bangor Theological Seminary. Nonetheless, he withdrew an offer to become a minister and instead pursued politics. He was a fairly controversial figure, being one of North Wales' few outspoken members of the Conservative Party. A steadfast Thatcherite early on, he opposed Welsh devolution and often clashed with Welsh language activist groups, so much so that he was targeted with letter bombs at one point. He published his autobiography entitled Y Rebel Mwyaf? ("The Biggest Rebel?") in 1991, and later also published an anthology of his own poetry entitled O Love of Things in 1997. Despite working passionately for the Conservative Party for more than two decades, he eventually became disenchanted with its shifts in policy and left it to join UKIP in 2003, becoming the party's vice-chairman for North Wales. He died at his home in Deganwy at the age of 57. Although he and his minority views were subject to some notoriety, Dafydd Wigley, former president of the pro-Welsh independence Plaid Cymru party, had respect for his strong personality and expressed sadness at his death.
