= Dafydd Jones (Dewi Dywyll) =

Welsh balladeer (1803–1868)

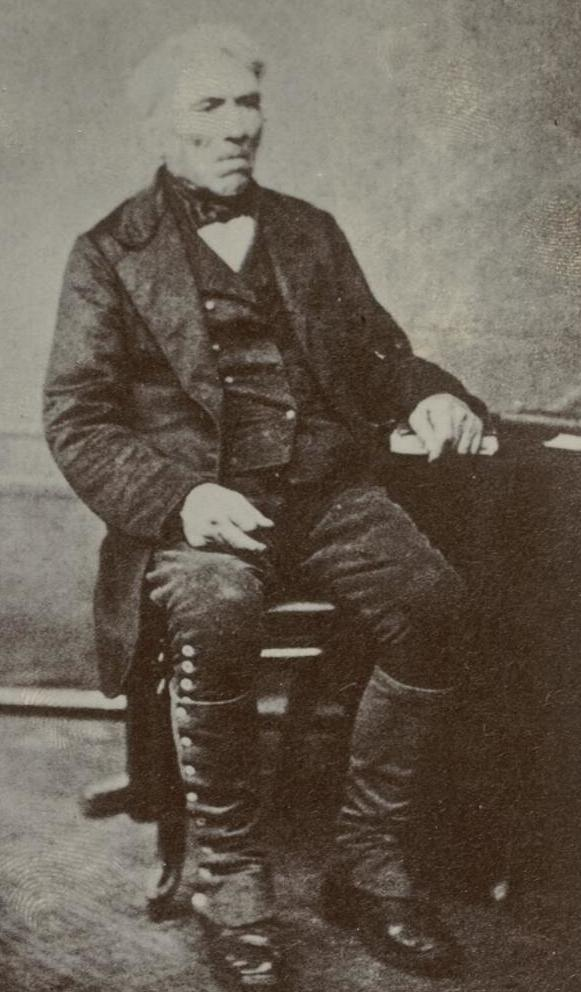
Dafydd Jones.jpg

Dafydd Jones or Dewi Dywyll (1803 – 1868) was a Welsh balladeer who performed in the Welsh language. His father was a carpenter in Llanybydder, Carmarthenshire, and he was born on the estate of Dolau Bach there. He was also known as Deio'r Cantwr (Davy the Singer) and Dewi Medi (Harvest Dave). Dafydd Jones gained the name Dewi Dywyll, which means Blind Davy, due to being blinded by accident.

Jones wrote ballads and sang them, gaining fame for his impromptu singing all over Wales in an age of wandering balladeers who were popular characters. He wrote at least 70 ballads according to the National Library of Wales.

Jones died at Lampeter in 1868.

== Examples of his work ==
Mewn gweithfeydd sydd yma'n Nghymru,
Gwelir Saeson yn busnesu;
Rhaid cael Cymry i dorri'r garreg,
Nid yw'r graig yn deall Saesneg.

—Dewi Dywyll, 1840 (from New Welsh Review)

In workplaces here in Wales
One sees the English meddling;
They must get the Welsh to break the rock,
The rock does not understand English.

Arddunol iaith barddoni - oludog,
Ni lwyda ei thlysni:
Iaith gwyddor, rhaith a gweddi,
Iaith y nef yw ein hiaith ni ...

The language of poetry is sublime and rich,
Its beauty shall not fade:
The language of science, law and prayer,
Our language is the language of Heaven.
