= Gareth F. Williams =

Welsh language writer (1955–2016)

- Born: Gareth Finlay Williams; 9 February 1955; Porthmadog
- Died: 14 September 2016 (aged 61)
- Occupations: Novelist, screenwriter
- Writing career
- Pen name: Gareth F. Williams

Gareth Finlay Williams (9 February 1955 – 14 September 2016) was a Welsh language author who wrote novels for children and adults, as well as creating many television drama series.

== Life ==
Williams was born in Porthmadog, as the son of Hugh Finley and Menna Williams.

He worked for two years in the Cob Records shop in Porthmadog between 1973 and 1975. He worked as a teacher of Welsh at Ysgol Rhiwabon between 1979 and 1985. He lived in Silverston, Vale of Glamorgan, before settling in Beddau near Pontypridd.

Williams was one of the three panelists for the Daniel Owen Memorial Prize at the National Eisteddfod of Monmouth in August 2016. He had been battling cancer and the day after awarding the prize in the Abergavenny Eisteddfod he was informed that he was not improving. He died at the age of 61 at his home in Graves, leaving his wife Rachel.

In 2018, two years after his death, he was awarded the Mary Vaughan Jones Award for his outstanding contribution to the field of children's literature. The trophy was presented to his family at a special ceremony in Portmeirion on 18 October 2018.

== Career ==
Williams won awards at the Tir na n-Og Award event six times in the Welsh language book categories. His book Awst yn Anogia, (August in Anogia) set on Crete during the Second World War, won an award as the best Welsh language book of the year at the 2015 Wales Book of the Year Awards. Williams had read about Anogeia after a holiday in Crete. In 2016, he was a judge for the literary awards prize at the 2016 National Eisteddfod of Wales. Williams also wrote and produced Welsh language television programmes for S4C, including Pengelli, Pen Tennyn, Rownd a Rownd, Sion a Siân, and Lan a Lawr.

=== Books ===
- Llyfrau Plant
- Cyfres Di-Ben-Draw:Uned III - Ysgrifennu a Darllen, 1993, (BBC)
- Dirgelwch Loch Ness, 1996, (Y Lolfa)
- O Ddawns i Ddawns, 1996, (Y Lolfa)
- Cyfres Cled: Pen Cyrliog a Sbectol Sgwâr, 1999, (Y Lolfa)
- Jara, 2004, (Gomer Press)
- Cyfres Lleisiau: Dial, 2006, (CAA)
- Cyfres Whap!: Adref heb Elin, 2006, (Gomer Press)
- Cyfres Tonic 5: Y Sifft Nos, 2007, (CAA)
- Cyfres Tonic 5: Bethan am Byth, 2007, (CAA)
- Nadolig Gwyn, 2007, (Gomer Press)
- Cyfres Stori Sydyn: Tacsi i'r Tywyllwch, 2007, (Y Lolfa)
- Curig a'r Morlo, 2009 (Gwasg Gwynedd)
- Plant y Pasg, 2017, (Gwasg Carreg Gwalch)
- Llyfrau Oedolion
- Dyfi Jyncshiyn: Y Dyn Blin, 2007 (Gwasg Gwynedd)
- Dyfi Jyncshiyn: Y Ddynes yn yr Haul, 2009 (Gwasg Gwynedd)
- Mei Ling a Meirion, 2010 (Gwasg Gwynedd)
- Creigiau Aberdaron, 2010 (Gwasg Gwynedd)
- Awst yn Anogia, 2014 (Gwasg Gwynedd)
