= Tir na n-Og Award =

Welsh children's literary awards

The Tir na n-Og Awards (abbreviated TnaO) are a set of annual children's literary awards in Wales from 1976. They are presented by the Books Council of Wales to the best books published during the preceding calendar year in each of three awards categories, one English-language and two Welsh-language. Their purpose is "[to raise] the standard of children's and young people's books and to encourage the buying and reading of good books." There is no restriction to fiction or prose. Each prize is £1,000.

The awards are named for Tír na nÓg, the "Land of the Young", an otherworldly realm in Irish mythology.

The English-language award honours one book with an "authentic Welsh background" whose original language is English. It is sponsored by the British Chartered Institute of Library and Information Professionals, Cymru Wales division (CILIP/Wales), and presented at that association's annual conference in May.

The Welsh-language Primary Sector and Secondary Sector awards honour one book written for primary school children and one for secondary school children. They are presented at the annual Urdd National Eisteddfod, recently at the beginning of June or end of May. Since 2011, the Welsh-language awards are co-sponsored by the Cardigan-based publisher Cymdeithas Lyfrau Ceredigion.

Shortlists comprising three or four books in each awards category have been published by BCW at least from 2011.

== Recent awards ==
2020

The primary sector award went to author Manon Steffan Ros and illustrator Jac Jones for Pobol Drws Nesaf (‘The People Next Door’).

2019

The 2018/2019 cycle was completed by announcements of the English-language winner on 16 May 2019 and the two Welsh-language winners at the Urdd National Eisteddfod on 30 May.

The primary sector award went to Elin Meek and Valériane Leblond for Cymru ar y Map, a lavishly illustrated picture atlas of Wales, published by Rily Publications.

The secondary sector award went to Manon Steffan Ros for Fi a Joe Allen, a football novel about a fan following the Welsh team to France, published by Y Lolfa.

The English-language award was presented to Catherine Fisher for The Clockwork Crow, a tale of enchantment involving Welsh folklore and set in a snowy Welsh landscape, published by Firefly Press.

2016

The 2015/2016 cycle was completed by announcements of the English-language winner on 26 May 2016 and the two Welsh-language winners at the Urdd National Eisteddfod on 2 June. Three shortlists of three or four books had been announced in March.

The primary sector award went to Sian Lewis and Valériane Leblond for Pedair Cainc y Mabinogi, a retelling of the Four Branches of the Mabinogi, published by Rily Publications.

The secondary sector award went to Llyr Titus for Gwalia, a space travel adventure, published by Gomer Press.

The English-language award was presented to Griff Rowland for The Search For Mister Lloyd, about a Welsh boy's search for his missing racing pigeon, published by Candy Jar Books.

2015

The 2014/2015 cycle was completed by announcements of the English-language winner on 14 May 2015 and the two Welsh-language winners at the Urdd National Eisteddfod on 28 May. Three shortlists of three or four books had been announced 26 March.

The primary sector award went to Caryl Lewis for Straeon Gorau'r Byd, a collection of stories from all over the world, published by Gwasg Carreg Gwalch.

The secondary sector award went to Gareth F. Williams for Y Gêm, a novel about football and friendship centred on events of the First World War, notably the Christmas truce, published by Gwasg Carreg Gwalch.

The English-language award was presented on 14 May 2015 at Swansea Central Library to Giancarlo Gemin for Cowgirl, a story of two very different girls in contemporary south Wales, published by Nosy Crow.

2014

The 2013/2014 cycle was completed 29 May 2014 at the Urdd National Eisteddfod in Pembrokeshire with the presentation of the two Welsh-language awards.

The primary sector award went to Gareth F. Williams for Cwmwl dros y Cwm, a historical novel set in Senghenydd in South Wales at the time of the disastrous colliery explosion in 1913, published by Gwasg Carreg Gwalch.

The secondary sector award went to Haf Llewelyn for Diffodd y Sêr, a historical novel about the family of Welsh poet Hedd Wyn (Ellis Humphrey Evans), who died at Passchendaele, published by Y Lolfa.

The English-language award was presented 15 May 2014 at Cardiff Central Library to Wendy White for Welsh Cakes and Custard, family-based stories about two young children in contemporary Wales, published by Gomer Press.

2013

The 2012/2013 cycle was completed 30 May 2013 at the Urdd National Eisteddfod with the presentation of the two Welsh-language awards.

The primary sector award went to Iolo Williams and Bethan Wyn Jones for Cynefin yr Ardd, a book about garden wildlife, published by Gwasg Carreg Gwalch.

The secondary sector award went to Alun Wyn Bevan for Y Gêmau Olympaidd a Champau’r Cymry, a celebration of the Olympic Games with emphasis on the Welsh connection, published by Gomer Press.

The English-language award was presented 16 May 2013 at Cardiff Central Library to Cwmbran-born Daniel Morden for Tree of Leaf and Flame, a collection of stories retelling the Mabinogion, illustrated by Brett Breckon and published by Pont Books. He won the same award in 2007 for Dark Tales from the Woods.

== Winners ==
There was a single Welsh-language award from 1976 to 1986, followed by dual fiction and nonfiction awards from 1987 to 2005, dual Primary and Secondary awards from 2006. There has been one English-language award throughout.

All three awards have been conferred every year from 1994. Previously seven English awards and one Welsh award were withheld.

In 2023 the Readers' Choice Award was introduced, with children and young people who took part in the Tir na n-Og Shadowing Scheme choosing their winners.

2025

- English-language: The Twelve by Liz Hyder
- Welsh, Primary: Arwana Swtan a’r Sgodyn Od by Angie Roberts and Dyfan Roberts
- Welsh, Secondary: Cymry Balch Ifanc by various authors, edited by Llŷr Titus and Megan Angharad Hunter
- Readers' Choice Award, Welsh, Primary: Llanddafad by Gareth Evans-Jones, illustrated by Lleucu Gwenllian
- Readers' Choice Award, Welsh, Secondary: Cynefin, Cymru a’r Byd by Dafydd Watcyn Williams
- Readers' Choice Award, English-language: Welsh Giants, Ghosts and Goblins by Claire Fayers

2024

- English-language: Where the River Takes Us, Lesley Parr (her 2nd TnO Award)
- Welsh, Primary: Jac a'r Angel, Daf James, illustrated by Bethan Mai
- Welsh, Secondary: Astronot yn yr Atig, Megan Angharad Hunter
- Readers' Choice Award, Welsh, Primary: Mari a Mrs Cloch, Caryl Lewis, illustrated by Valériane Leblond
- Readers' Choice Award, Welsh, Secondary: Sêr y Nos yn Gwenu, Casia Wiliam
- Readers' Choice Award, English-language: Where the River Takes Us, Lesley Parr

2023

- English-language: The Drowned Woods, Emily Lloyd-Jones
- Welsh, Primary: Dwi Eisiau bod yn Ddeinosor, Luned Aaron & Huw Aaron
- Welsh, Secondary: Manawydan Jones: Y Pair Dadeni, Alun Davies
- Readers' Choice Award, Welsh, Primary: Enwogion o Fri: Nye – Bywyd Angerddol Aneurin Bevan, Manon Steffan Ros (her 6th TnO Award), illustrated by Valériane Leblond
- Readers' Choice Award, Welsh, Secondary: Powell, Manon Steffan Ros (her 7th TnO Award)
- Readers' Choice Award, English-language: The Mab, Eloise Williams, Matt Brown, illustrated by Max Low

2022

- English-language: The Valley of the Lost Secrets, Lesley Parr
- Welsh, Primary: Gwag y Nos, Sioned Wyn Roberts
- Welsh, Secondary: Y Pump, Elgan Rhys

2021

- English-language: The Short Knife, Elen Caldecott
- Welsh, Primary: Sw Sara Mai, Casia Wiliam
- Welsh, Secondary: #helynt, Rebecca Roberts

2020

- English-language: Storm Hound, Claire Fayers
- Welsh, Primary: Pobol Drws Nesaf, Manon Steffan Ros (her 5th TnO Award), illustrated by Jac Jones
- Welsh, Secondary: Byw yn fy Nghroen, Sioned Erin Hughes

2019

- English-language: The Clockwork Crow, Catherine Fisher (her 2nd TnO Award)
- Welsh, Primary: Cymru ar y Map, Elin Meek and Valériane Leblond (Leblond's 2nd TnO Award)
- Welsh, Secondary: Fi a Joe Allen, Manon Steffan Ros (her 4th TnO Award)

2018

- English-language: The Nearest Faraway Place, Hayley Long
- Welsh, Primary: Dosbarth Miss Prydderch a'r Carped Hud, Mererid Hopwood (her 2nd TnO Award)
- Welsh, Secondary: Mae'r Lleuad ynGoch, Myrddin ap Dafydd (his 2nd TnO Award)

2017

- English-language: Sweet Pizza, Giancarlo Gemin (his 2nd TnO Award)
- Welsh, Primary: ABC Byd Natur, Luned Aaron
- Welsh, Secondary: Pluen, Manon Steffan Ros (her 3rd TnO Award)

2016

- English-language: The Search for Mister Lloyd, Griff Rowland
- Welsh, Primary: Pedair Cainc Y Mabinogi, Siân Lewis (her 2nd TnO Award), illustrated by Valeriane Leblond
- Welsh, Secondary: Gwalia, Llŷr Titus

2015

- English-language: Cowgirl, Giancarlo Gemin
- Welsh, Primary: Straeon Gorau'r Byd, Caryl Lewis (her 2nd TnO Award)
- Welsh, Secondary: Y Gêm, Gareth F. Williams (his 6th TnO Award)

2014

- English-language: Welsh Cakes and Custard, Wendy White, illustrated by Helen Flook
- Welsh, Primary: Cwmwl dros y Cwm, Gareth F. Williams (his 5th TnO Award)
- Welsh, Secondary: Diffodd y Sêr, Haf Llewelyn

2013

- English-language: Tree of Leaf and Flame, Daniel Morden
- Welsh, Primary: Cynefin yr Ardd, Iolo Williams and Bethan Wyn Jones
- Welsh, Secondary: Y Gêmau Olympaidd a Champau’r Cymry, Alun Wyn Bevan

2012

- English-language: Full Moon, Jenny Sullivan
- Welsh, Primary: Prism, Manon Steffan Ros
- Welsh, Secondary: Yr Alarch Du, Rhiannon Wyn

2011

- English-language: Three Little Sheep, Rob Lewis
- Welsh, Primary: Dirgelwch y Bont, Hywel Griffiths
- Welsh, Secondary: Stwff Guto S. Tomos, Lleucu Roberts

2010

- English-language: Dear Mr Author, Paul Manship
- Welsh, Primary: Trwy’r Tonnau, Manon Steffan Ros
- Welsh, Secondary: Codi Bwganod, Rhiannon Wyn

2009

- English-language: Merlin's Magical Creatures, Graham Howells
- Welsh, Primary: Bownsio, Emily Huws
- Welsh, Secondary: Annwyl Smotyn Bach, Lleucu Roberts

2008

- English-language: Finding Minerva, Frances Thomas
- Welsh, Primary: Y Llyfr Ryseitiau: Gwaed y Tylwyth, Nicholas Daniels
- Welsh, Secondary: Eira Mân, Eira Mawr, Gareth F. Williams

2007

- English-language: Dark Tales from the Woods, Daniel Morden
- Welsh, Primary: Ein Rhyfel Ni, Mair Wynn Hughes
- Welsh, Secondary: Adref Heb Elin, Gareth F. Williams

2006

- English-language: Tirion's Secret Journal, Jenny Sullivan
- Welsh, Primary: Carreg Ateb, Emily Huws
- Welsh, Secondary: Creadyn, Gwion Hallam

Before 2006 the dual Welsh-language awards recognised fiction and nonfiction books.

2005

- English-language: The Seal Children, Jackie Morris
- Welsh, Fiction: Eco, Emily Huws
- Welsh, Nonfiction: Byd Llawn Hud, Ceri Wyn Jones, Tudur Dylan, Mererid Hopwood, Sonia Edwards and Elinor Wyn Reynold

2004

- English-language: The Battle of Mametz Wood, 1916, Robert Phillips
- Welsh, Fiction: Iawn Boi?, Caryl Lewis
- Welsh, Nonfiction: Stori Dafydd ap Gwilym, Gwyn Thomas & Margaret Jones

2003

- English-language: Cold Jac, Rob Lewis
- Welsh, Fiction: Sgôr, Bethan Gwanas
- Welsh, Nonfiction: Dewi Sant, Rhiannon Ifans & Margaret Jones

2002

- English-language: Georgie, Malachy Doyle
- Welsh, Fiction: Gwirioni, Shoned Wyn Jones
- Welsh, Nonfiction: Poeth! Cerddi Poeth ac Oer, Non ap Emlyn & Marian Delyth

2001

- English-language: The Seeing Stone, Kevin Crossley-Holland
- Welsh, Fiction: Llinyn Trôns, Bethan Gwanas
- Welsh, Nonfiction: Jam Coch Mewn Pwdin Reis, Myrddin ap Dafydd

2000

- English-language: Artworks On ... Interiors, Jo Dahn & Justine Baldwin
- Welsh, Fiction: Ta Ta-Tryweryn, Gwenno Hughes
- Welsh, Nonfiction: Chwedlau o’r Gwledydd Celtaidd, Rhiannon Ifans & Margaret Jones

1999

- English-language: Rhian’s Song, Gillian Drake
- Welsh, Fiction: Pam Fi Eto, Duw?, John Owen
- Welsh, Nonfiction: Byw a Bod yn y Bàth, Lis Jones

1998

- English-language: Alwena’s Garden, Mary Oldham
- Welsh, Fiction: Dyddiau Cŵn, Gwen Redvers Jones
- Welsh, Nonfiction: Stori Branwen, Tegwyn Jones & Jac Jones

1997

- English-language: Cities in the Sea, Siân Lewis & Jackie Morris
- Welsh, Fiction: Ydy Fe!, John Owen
- Welsh, Nonfiction: Dirgelwch Loch Ness, Gareth F. Williams

1996

- English-language: Who’s Afraid of the Bwgan-wood?, Anne Lewis
- Welsh, Fiction: Coch yw Lliw Hunllef, Mair Wynn Hughes
- Welsh, Nonfiction: Sbectol Inc, Eleri Ellis Jones & Marian Delyth

1995

- English-language: The Candle Man, Catherine Fisher
- Welsh, Fiction: Pam Fi, Duw, Pam Fi?, John Owen
- Welsh, Nonfiction: Geiriadur Gomer i’r Ifanc, D Geraint Lewis

1994

- English-language: Denny and the Magic Pool, Pamela Purnell
- Welsh, Fiction: Sothach a Sglyfath, Angharad Tomos
- Welsh, Nonfiction: Cristion Ydw I, Huw John Hughes & Rheinallt Thomas

1993

- English-language: Award withheld
- Welsh, Fiction: ’Tisio Tshipsan?, Emily Huws
- Welsh, Nonfiction: Chwedl Taliesin, Gwyn Thomas & Margaret Jones

1992

- English-language: Who Stole a Bloater?, Frances Thomas
- Welsh, Fiction: joint winners:
  - Wmffra, Emily Huws
  - Broc Môr, Gwen Redvers Jones
- Welsh, Nonfiction: Yn y Dechreuad, Robert M. Morris & Catrin Stephens

1991

- English-language: Award withheld
- Welsh, Fiction: O Ddawns i Ddawns, Gareth F. Williams
- Welsh, Nonfiction: Cymru Ddoe a Heddiw, Geraint H. Jenkins

1990

- English-language: Award withheld
- Welsh, Fiction: Llygedyn o Heulwen, Mair Wynn Hughes
- Welsh, Nonfiction: Lleuad yn Olau, T. Llew Jones & Jac Jones

1989

- English-language: Award withheld
- Welsh, Fiction: joint winners:
  - Liw, Irma Chilton
  - Ben y Garddwr a Storïau Eraill, Jac Jones
- Welsh, Nonfiction: Culhwch ac Olwen, Gwyn Thomas & Margaret Jones — a retelling of Culhwch and Olwen

1988

- English-language: Steel Town Cats, Celia Lucas
- Welsh, Fiction: ’Tydi Bywyd yn Boen!, Gwenno Hywyn
- Welsh, Nonfiction: Yr Atlas Cymraeg, Dafydd Orwig (editor)

1987

- English-language: The Snow Spider, Jenny Nimmo
- Welsh, Fiction: Jabas, Penri Jones
- Welsh, Nonfiction: Gardd o Gerddi, Alun Jones & John Pinion Jones

Before 1987 there were only two awards, one for English- and one for Welsh-language books.

1986

- English: Region of the Summer Stars, Frances Thomas
- Welsh: Y Llipryn Llwyd, Angharad Tomos

1985

- Awards withheld

1984

- English: The Prize, Irma Chilton
- Welsh: joint winners:
  - Y Llinyn Arian, Mair Wynn Hughes
  - Herio’r Cestyll, Malcolm M. Jones, Cyril Jones & Gwen Redvers Jones

1983

- English: Bluestones, Mary John
- Welsh: Croes Bren yn Norwy, J. Selwyn Lloyd

1982

- English: Award withheld
- Welsh: Gaeaf y Cerrig, Gweneth Lilly

1981

- English: The Blindfold Track, Frances Thomas
- Welsh: Y Drudwy Dewr, Gweneth Lilly

1980

- English: Award withheld
- Welsh: Y Llong, Irma Chilton

1979

- English: Time Circles, Bette Meyrick
- Welsh: Y Flwyddyn Honno, Dyddgu Owen

1978

- English: Silver on the Tree, Susan Cooper
- Welsh: Miriam, Jane Edwards

1977

- English: A String in the Harp, Nancy Bond
- Welsh: Trysor Bryniau Caspar, J. Selwyn Lloyd

1976

- English: The Grey King, Susan Cooper
- Welsh: Tân ar y Comin, T. Llew Jones

== Winners of multiple awards ==
Pont Books, the children's imprint of Gomer Press (Gwasg Gomer), has published the last nine books to win the English award, 2006 to 2014. Gwasg Gomer has also published five winners of Welsh awards during that time. Y Lolfa, Tal-y-bont published six of the eight books to win the Welsh-language awards, 2009 to 2012.

Several authors have won two awards, including all three winners in 2012 and both winners of the first awards in 1976, Susan Cooper and T. Llew Jones.

For the inaugural English Award-winning novel, The Grey King (1975), Cooper also won the Newbery Medal recognising the year's "most distinguished contribution to American literature for children". She won the third English Award in 1978 for its sequel, Silver on the Tree, the concluding Dark is Rising novel. For that series, in April 2012 she won the annual American Library Association lifetime award for "lasting contribution to young adult literature", the Margaret A. Edwards Award.
