= Angharad Tomos =

Welsh author and activist, born 1958

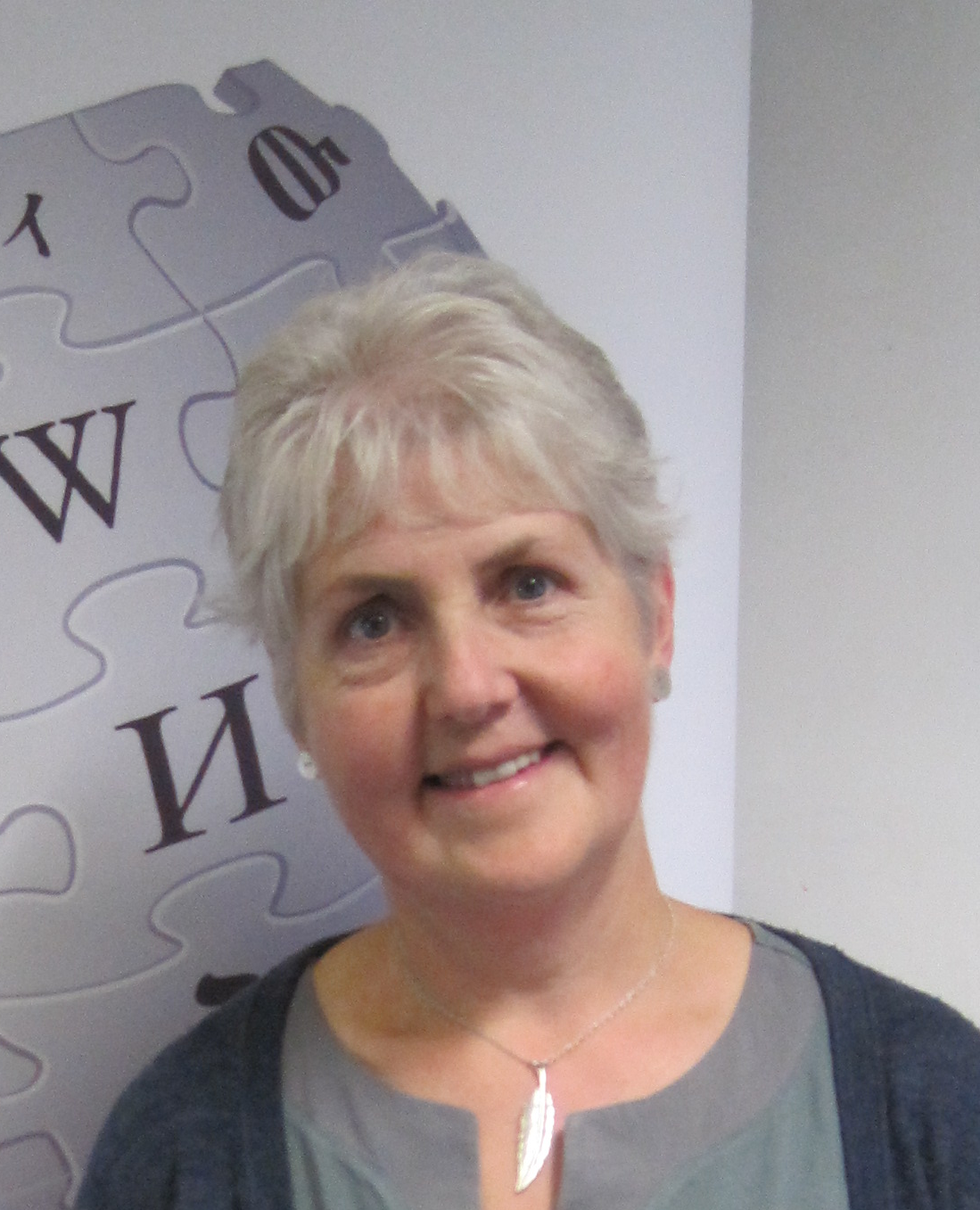
- Angharad Tomos
- Born: 19 July 1958 (age 68); Bangor, Gwynedd, Wales
- Education: Ysgol Gynradd Bontnewydd, Ysgol Dyffryn Nantlle, Aberystwyth University, Bangor University
- Occupations: Author and language activist
- Spouse: Ben Gregory
- Writing career
- Language: Welsh
- Period: 1982–
- Genres: Children's literature, adult fiction, non-fiction

Angharad Tomos (born 19 July 1958) is a Welsh author and prominent language activist. She is a recipient of the Tir na n-Og Award.

== Biography ==
Tomos was born in Bangor, Gwynedd, in 1958, and raised with her four sisters in Llanwnda near Caernarfon. She attended Ysgol Gynradd Bontnewydd and Ysgol Dyffryn Nantlle. She began her higher education at Aberystwyth University, but left prior to completing her studies to go and work for Cymdeithas yr Iaith Gymraeg. She later graduated in Welsh and Sociology from Bangor University and went on to receive an MA.

Tomos is married to Ben Gregory and lives in Pen-y-Groes, Gwynedd.

== Writing ==
Tomos contributed much to Welsh-language children's literature. She won the Crown at Eisteddfod yr Urdd in 1982, with Hen Fyd Hurt, which can be translated as "Silly Old World" and contains Tomos's reflections on her experience when unemployed. The protagonist Heulwen, who has no job, takes drawing lessons, as did Tomos herself.

The children's books she has written and illustrated include the Rwdlan (To prattle) series of 13 self-illustrated volumes set in Gwlad y Rwla. It received the Tir na n-Óg prize. Rala Rwdins, the first title in the series, appeared as Y Lolfa in 1983. Later on, there were television and theatre adaptations of scripts she had written. The series has been translated into Irish and Breton.

In 1985 Tomos won an Academi Gymreig prize for her novel Yma o Hyd about prison life, which she experienced at Risley Prison for actions whilst campaigning for the Welsh language. She had attempted to climb the Crystal Palace TV transmitter to express concern about the lack of television broadcasting in Welsh. Yma O Hyd (Still Here) takes the form of an illegal diary written on toilet paper by a female prisoner. The title derived from a theme song of the 1980s cultural movement written by Dafydd Iwan as a rebellious response to lost elections for a Welsh assembly in 1979.

Si Hei Lwli (1991) was her third novel. It also has autobiographical elements. Its title comes from a Welsh lullaby. The plot covers a car journey by the main character, who is in her twenties, with her aunt, who is in her nineties.

Titrwm (1994) takes the form of a prose song, soliloquising the story of a deaf, mentally impaired woman called Awen (meaning Inspiration). Despite physical and mental disadvantages, she learns to read and gains an interest in books. The only person she can communicate with is her son Titrwm. Her communication problems symbolise the political situation in a marginalised Wales and like Awen, symbolically raped by an Englishman (subsequently killed by her brother). The beginning suggests a personal story of love and identity, but the end has a clear political character. The title Titrwm suggests the sound of a falling stone thrown by a lover at his girl's window.

In 2004 Tomos wrote Wele'n Gwawrio (Behold, It Dawns), again with a title from a song, this time a Christmas carol. It presents the dawn of the third millennium, through a main character filled with political chagrin and seeking comfort in religious contemplation.

She published a historical novel, Rhagom, in 2004, discussing the atrocities of the First and the Second World Wars.

Tomas writes a Welsh-language column for the Daily Post and a blog on its website.

On 24 September 2009, a ceramic sculpture of Tomos was unveiled at Parc Glynllifon, near Caernarfon, the third in a series of six by Welsh artist Katie Scarlett Howard as part of the Budding Artists' "Woman of Substance" project.

Tomos's works make frequent use of autobiographical elements, philosophical discussions, satire and humour. She refers to Welsh cultural heritage, such as myths, heroes and heroines, songs and poetry, all set in a broader global context. Her novels feature a personal writing style especially in descriptions of ordinary life shown from an often satirical or humorous perspective. Her writing applies elements of pidginisation and local dialect that give a sense of Welsh linguistic and cultural authenticity.

Her themes portray a world troubled by lack of equality, notably a lack of equal chances to develop potential. She advocates change in human rights, and so goes beyond the Welsh context into global perspectives.

Other genres in which she has written include travel literature, television scripts, drama (Cyffes, 1994), drama and prose criticism, autobiography (Cnonyn Aflonydd, 2001), newspaper columns and journal writing (especially political and literary).

== Language activism ==
Tomos was chairwoman of Cymdeithas yr Iaith from 1982 to 1984, during the launch of the campaigns for a Welsh Language Act and a body to develop Welsh medium education.

== Bibliography ==
=== Novels ===
- Yma o Hyd, December 1985 (Y Lolfa)
- Si Hei Lwli, January 1991 (Y Lolfa)
- Hen Fyd Hurt, January 1992 (Y Lolfa)
- Titrwm, January 1994 (Y Lolfa)
- Wele'n Gwawrio, August 2004 (Y Lolfa)
- Rhagom, October 2004 (Gwasg Carreg Gwalch)
- Wrth fy Nagrau i, October 2007 (Gwasg Carreg Gwalch)

=== Non-fiction ===
- Cyfres y Cewri: 23. Cnonyn Aflonydd, July 2001 (Gwasg Gwynedd)
- Hiraeth am Yfory: Hanes David Thomas a Mudiad Llafur Gogledd Cymru, July 2002 (Gwasg Gomer)
- Y Byd a'r Betws, December 2003 (Y Lolfa)

=== Children's ===
- Rwdlan series, 1983– (Y Lolfa)
- Stwnsh Rwdlan – Llyfr Coginio i Blant Bach, November 1997 (Y Lolfa)
- Parti Cwmwl – Llyfr Coginio i Blant Bach, September 1998 (Y Lolfa)
- Cyfres Darllen Mewn Dim series, October 2006 (Y Lolfa)
- Guto series, 1991 (Cwmni Recordiau Sain)
- Llyfrau Fi Hefyd series, 1999 (Cyhoeddiadau'r Gair)

== Honours and awards ==
- 1982 – Crown, Eisteddfod yr Urdd for Hen Fyd Hurt
- 1986 – Tir na n-Og Award for Y Llipryn Llwyd (Cyfres Rwdlan)
- 1991 – Prose Medal, Welsh National Eisteddfod for Si Hei Lwli
- 1997 – Prose Medal, Welsh National Eisteddfod for Wele'n Gwawrio
- 1994 – Tir na n-Og Award for Sothach a Sglyfath (Cyfres Cled)
- 2009 – Mary Vaughan Jones Award
