= Mike Jenkins (poet) =

Welsh poet (born 1953)

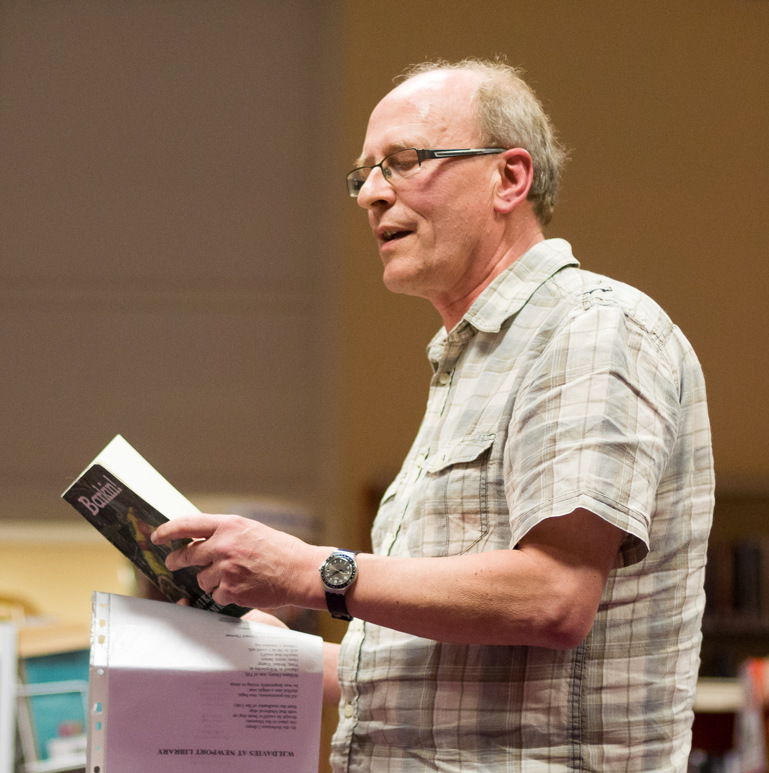
- Jenkins performing at Rhydyfelin Library in 2014
- Born: 1953 (age 72–73); Aberystwyth, Wales
- Education: University College of Wales
- Occupations: Poet and writer
- Children: Bethan Sayed (née Jenkins), Ciaran Jenkins
- Writing career
- Notable awards: Wales Book of the Year; John Tripp Award for Spoken Poetry; Eric Gregory Award from the Society of Authors; The Young Writers Prize from the Welsh Arts Council
- Website: mikejenkins.net

Mike Jenkins (born 1953) is a Welsh poet and fiction writer in English. He is also the father of the Plaid Cymru politician Bethan Sayed (née Jenkins) and of the journalist Ciaran Jenkins.

== Early life and education ==
Born in Aberystwyth, Jenkins was educated there at what was then the University College of Wales.

== Work ==
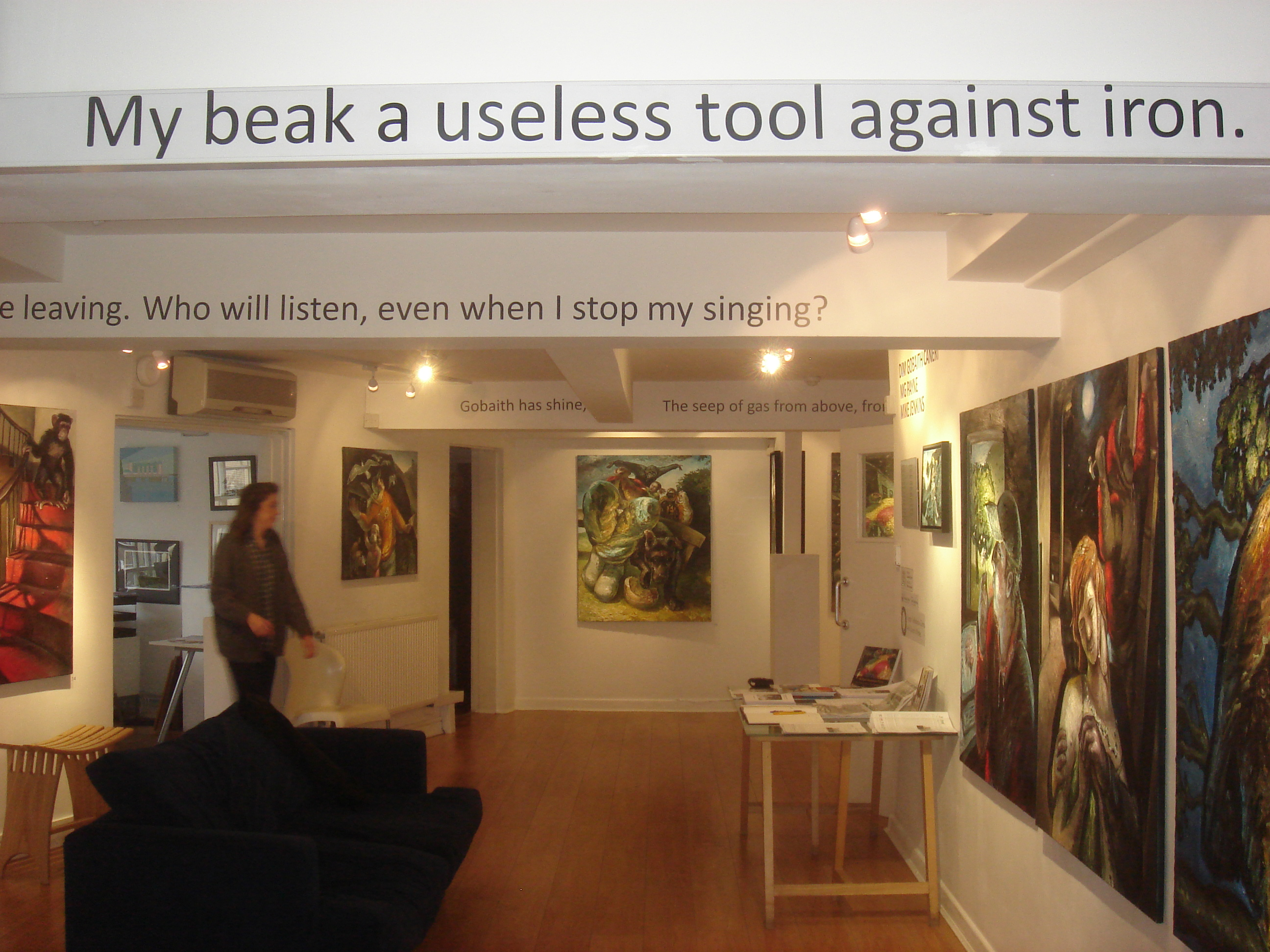
Dim Gobaith Caneri exhibition by Mike Jenkins (poetry) and Gustavius Payne (painting). February 2012, Washington Gallery, Penarth

A former winner of the Wales Book of the Year competition for Wanting to Belong (Seren), Jenkins is a former editor of Poetry Wales and a long-term co-editor of Red Poets. He taught English at Radyr Comprehensive School in Cardiff for nearly a decade and Penydre High School, Gurnos, Merthyr Tydfil, for some two decades before that. At the end of the 2008–2009 academic year, Jenkins took voluntary redundancy. He now writes full-time, capitalising on experiences gleaned from former pupils.

An extract from one of Jenkins' poems has been used as part of the public-realm regeneration scheme for Merthyr Tydfil town centre.

Jenkins has twice judged the International Welsh Poetry Competition, in 2009 and in 2019.

In 2011–12, he produced an Arts Council of Wales-funded touring exhibition and booklet titled Dim Gobaith Caneri, in collaboration with fellow Merthyr Tydfil resident, the painter Gustavius Payne, using Welsh language idioms, through the medium of English, to comment on current world affairs, including the banking crisis and a local open-cast mine. He continues to live in Merthyr Tydfil, and has done so for over 30 years.

His 2013 collection, Barkin!, published by Gwasg Carreg Gwalch, was shortlisted for 2014's Wales Book of the Year Award.

== Selected publications ==
- The Common Land (Poetry Wales Press, 1981) (Poetry)
- The Valleys (An anthology from south Wales Valleys, co-edited with John Davies) (Poetry Wales Press, 1984) (Poetry and prose)
- Empire of Smoke (Poetry Wales Press, 1983) (Poetry)
- Invisible Times (Seren, 1986) (Poetry)
- A Dissident Voice (Seren, 1990) (Poetry)
- Graffiti Narratives (Planet, 1994) (Poetry and stories in Merthyr dialect)
- Are You Talking To Me? (Together with four other poets) (Pont, 1994) (Poetry for teenagers)
- This House, My Ghetto (Seren, 1995) (Poetry)
- Wanting to Belong (Seren, 1997) (Short stories). Winner of Wales Book of the Year 1998
- Red Landscapes: New and Selected Poems (Seren, 1999) (New and selected poems)
- Coulda Bin Summin (Planet, 2001) (Poems in dialect)
- Barbsmashive (Pont, 2002) (Novella for children)
- Laughter Tangled in Thorn and Other Poems (Corgi Series: 3) (Gwasg Carreg Gwalch, 2002) (Selected poems)
- Poems for Underage Thinkers (Pont, 2004) (Poetry for children)
- The Language of Flight (Gwasg Carreg Gwalch, 2004) (Poetry)
- Child of Dust (Gomer, 2005) (Short fiction)
- Walking on Waste (Gwasg Carreg Gwalch, 2007) (Poetry)
- The Fugitive Three (Cinnamon Press, 2008) (Novel)
- The Climbing Tree (Pont, 2010) (Young adult fiction)
- Moor Music (Seren, 2011) (Open field poems)
- Dim Gobaith Caneri (Self-published using Arts Council of Wales funding, 2011) (Poetry and micro-fiction using Welsh language idioms in English)
- Barkin! (Gwasg Carreg Gwalch, 2013) (Poems & stories in Merthyr dialect)
- Question Island (Alun Books, 2013) (A novel for teenagers)
- Shedding Paper Skin (Gwasg Carreg Gwalch, 2015) (Poetry)
- From Aberfan t Grenfell (with Alan Perry) (Culture Matters, 2019) (Poetry & drawings)
- Anonymous Bosch (with Dave Lewis) (Culture Matters, 2021) (Poetry & photography)
