= Emily Huws =

Welsh children's writer

- Born: 3 March 1942 (age 84); Tyddyn Llwyni, Caeathro, Caernarfon
- Occupation: Children's author

Emily Huws (born 3 March 1942) is a Welsh language children's author. She is a recipient of the Mary Vaughan Jones Award.

== Biography ==
Huws was born in Tyddyn Llwyni, Caeathro, Caernarfon, where she still lives today. Huws was educated at Ysgol Gynradd Waunfawr, Caernarfon Grammar School and Bangor University.

As well as writing original works, Huws also produces adaptations. One of her latest adaptations into Welsh includes Y Bachgen Mewn Pyjamas, published by Gwasg Carreg Gwalch in September 2009, which is an adaptation of John Boynes The Boy in the Striped Pyjamas.

== Work ==
=== Children's books ===
- Cyfres Corryn: Chwannen, March 1990, (Gwasg Gomer)
- Wmffra, 1992, (Gwasg Gomer)
- Tisio Tshipsan?, 1993, (Gwasg Gomer)
- Mot, January 1995, (Gwasg Gomer)
- Cyfres Cled: Sgin Ti Drons?, October 1995, (Gwasg Gomer)
- Llyfrau Darllen CBAC Cyfnod Allweddol 2 Ail Iaith (Lefelau 3/4): Busnesa, July 1998, (Uned Iaith/Cyd-Bwyllgor Addysg Cymru)
- Llyfrau Darllen CBAC Cyfnod Allweddol 2 Ail Iaith (Lefelau 3/4): Sosej i Carlo, July 1998, (Uned Iaith/Cyd-Bwyllgor Addysg Cymru)
- Llyfrau Darllen CBAC Cyfnod Allweddol 2 Ail Iaith (Lefelau 3/4): Symud Mynydd, July 1998, (Uned Iaith/Cyd-Bwyllgor Addysg Cymru)
- Anifeiliaid Aaron: 2. Carla, September 2001, (Gwasg Gomer)
- Anifeiliaid Aaron: 3. Jini Jinjila, September 2001, (Gwasg Gomer)
- Cyfres Corryn: Tostyn, November 2002, (Gwasg Gomer)
- Cyfres Blodyn Haf: 1 Eco, November 2004, (Cymdeithas Lyfrau Ceredigion)
- Nid fy May i, April 2005, (Cymdeithas Lyfrau Ceredigion)
- Ned, May 2005, (Gwasg Carreg Gwalch)
- Cyfres Blodyn Haf: 2 Carreg Ateb, June 2005, (Cymdeithas Lyfrau Ceredigion)
- Cyfres Hwyl Gŵyl: Dathlu Calan Gaeaf (Myrddin ap Dafydd, Emily Huws, Gordon Jones, Siân Lewis, Gwyn Morgan), September 2005, (Gwasg Carreg Gwalch)
- Cyfres Blodyn Haf: 3 Babi Gwyrdd, April 2006, (Cymdeithas Lyfrau Ceredigion)
- Lol neu Lwc?, November 2006, (Gwasg Gwynedd)
- Hogan Mam, Babi Jam, November 2007, (Cymdeithas Lyfrau Ceredigion)
- Bownsio, October 2008, (Cymdeithas Lyfrau Ceredigion)
- Dim Problem, December 2009 (Canolfan Astudiaethau Addysg)

=== Cassettes ===
- Casetiau Cbac Cyfnod Allweddol 2 Ail Iaith (Lefelau 3/4): Ysbryd yn yr Ardd, December 1998, (Uned Iaith/Cyd-Bwyllgor Addysg Cymru)
- Casetiau CBAC Cyfnod Allweddol 2 Ail Iaith (Lefelau 3/4): Babi Tŷ Ni, December 1998, (Uned Iaith/Cyd-Bwyllgor Addysg Cymru)
- Casetiau CBAC Cyfnod Allweddol 2 Ail Iaith (Lefelau 3/4): Sosej i Carlo, December 1998, (Uned Iaith/Cyd-Bwyllgor Addysg Cymru)
- Casetiau CBAC Cyfnod Allweddol 2 Ail Iaith (Lefelau 3/4): Busnesa, December 1998, (Uned Iaith/Cyd-Bwyllgor Addysg Cymru)
- Casetiau Cbac Cyfnod Allweddol 2 Ail Iaith (Lefelau 3/4): Symud Mynydd, December 1998, (Uned Iaith/Cyd-Bwyllgor Addysg Cymru)

== Awards and honours ==
- Mary Vaughan Jones Award 1988
- Tir na n-Og Award 1992 Wmffra
- Tir na n-Og Award 1993 Tisio Tshipsan?
- Tir na n-Og Award 2005 Eco.
- Tir na n-Og Award 2006 Carreg Ateb.
- The cover of Hogan Mam, Babi Jam won an award for her publisher, Cymdeithas Lyfrau Ceredigion at the Wales Publishing Trade Awards 2007 - Best Christmas Cover Design
- Tir na n-Og Award 2009 Bownsio.
