= Cymdeithas Lyfrau Ceredigion =

Welsh publisher

Cymdeithas Lyfrau Ceredigion (Welsh for 'Ceredigion book society'; CLC) was a Welsh publisher, established in 1954, specialising in books of interest to Ceredigion, and Welsh language children's books, including adaptations and original works. Cymdeithas Lyfrau Ceredigion bought the Welsh Teldisc Ltd c. 1974.

Some of the publisher's most popular books included those based on Sali Mali and her friends, a children's character originally created by author Mary Vaughan Jones and illustrated by Rowena Wyn Jones.

Cymdeithas Lyfrau Ceredigion came to an end in 2009, when it was bought out by another publisher, Gwasg Gomer.

== Awards and honours ==
=== Publishing Industry Awards, Wales ===
- 2005 – Children's Bestseller, Jac y Jwc ar y Fferm, Dylan Williams and Gordon Jones
- 2007 – Best Christmas Book Cover Design, Hogan Mam, Babi Jam, Emily Huws
- 2007 – Design and Production, Y Golygiadur, Rhiannon Ifans
