= Mary Vaughan Jones =

Welsh children's author and schoolteacher

Mary Vaughan Jones (28 May 1918 – April/May/June 1983) was a celebrated Welsh children's author and schoolteacher.

She was born at 'Firs Cottage', Maenan near Llanrwst in 1918, and died in the Rhuddlan area, Clwyd in 1983.

Jones authored approximately 20 books, contributing regularly to children's literature in Wales, and the magazines of the Urdd.

Many of her books have been re-published by Gymdeithas Lyfrau Ceredigion. Many new books are based on her characters, for example: Sali Mali a'r Ceffyl Gwyllt, Dylan Williams, 2006. Various children's television programmes and merchandise connected to her characters have also been produced by S4C. The original illustrations in her books were the work of Rowena Wyn Jones and later, Jac Jones.

During her career as a teacher she worked at:

- Ysgol Gynradd Cwm Penanner (1940–1943)
- Ysgol Lluest Aberystwyth (1943–1949)
- Ysgol Baratoad Aber-mad (1949–1953)
- Ysgol Gymraeg Aberystwyth (1953–1958)
- Lecturer at Bangor Normal College (1958–1972)

An award was established to commemorate her literary contribution.

== Bibliography ==
- Cyfres Darllen Stori: 1. Sali Mali (First published 1969)
- Cyfres Darllen Stori: 2. Y Pry Bach Tew (First published 1969)
- Cyfres Darllen Stori: 3. Annwyd y Pry Bach Tew (First published 1972)
- Cyfres Darllen Stori: 4. Jaci Soch (First published 1969)
- Cyfres Darllen Stori: 5: Tomos Caradog 1969
- Cyfres Darllen Stori: 7. Pastai Tomos Caradog (First published April 1997)
- Cyfres Darllen Stori: 8. Morgan a Magi Ann (First published 1975, then again in 2002)
- Cyfres Darllen Stori: 9. Siencyn (First published 1975)
- Cyfres Darllen Stori: Bobi Jo (First published 1976)
- Llyfrau Dau Dau: Rhigymau Jac y Jwc
- Llyfrau Dau Dau: Llyfr Bach Jac y Jwc
- Llyfrau Dau Dau: Llyfr Mawr Jac y Jwc
- Llyfrau Dau Dau: Llyfr Bach Nicw Nacw
- Llyfrau Dau Dau: Llyfr Mawr Nicw Nacw
- Llyfrau Dau Dau: Llyfr Bach Dwmplen Malwoden
- Llyfrau Dau Dau: Llyfr Mawr Dwmplen Malwoden
- Llyfrau Dau Dau: Llyfr Bach Guto
- Llyfrau Dau Dau: Llyfr Mawr Guto
- Llyfrau Dau Dau: Llyfr Mawr Culhwch
- Llyfrau Dau Dau: Storïau Llafar 1
- Llyfrau Dau Dau: Canllaw Athrawon
- Cynllun y Porth: Ni ein Hunain - Y Goeden
- Y Dynion Bach Od
- Ben y Garddwr a Storïau Eraill (Tir na n-Og Award winner 1989)
- Sami Seimon a Storïau Eraill
- Begw'r Iâr yn Mynd am Dro (First published 1980)
