= Gweneth Lilly =

Welsh writer (1920–2004)

- Born: 24 September 1920; Liverpool, Merseyside, England
- Died: 5 April 2004 (aged 83); Llanfairfechan, Conwy, Wales
- Citizenship: United Kingdom
- Education: University of Liverpool
- Occupations: Teacher; Writer
- Years active: 1977–1994

Gweneth Lilly (24 September 1920 – 5 April 2004) was a Welsh writer and teacher who authored novels, children's and teenage books and adult books in English and Welsh. She worked as a teacher at the University of Liverpool and later at St. Mary's College in Bangor until she retired in 1977 to focus on writing on which she authored 13 books in her lifetime. Lilly won the Tir na n-Og Award twice in 1981 and 1982. The Bangor University Archives holds a collection of works related to the writer.

== Early life ==
On 24 September 1920, Lilly was born to Welsh parents in the English city of Liverpool. She was the only child of parents coming from Anglesey; her father admired Alfred, Lord Tennyson and educated her on Lewis Carroll and Arthurian legends. Lilly grew up in Liverpool, and was taught at Liverpool Girls' College. She matriculated to University of Liverpool, where she read English. Lilly conducted a post-graduate study of John Donne and Gerard Manley Hopkins.

== Career ==
She was appointed lecturer of English at the University of Liverpool, before moving to Wales with her mother in 1946 to teach the same subject at St. Mary's College in Bangor. Lilly remained at St. Mary's College where she read the works of Leon Garfield, Alan Garner and William Mayne until she retired in 1977. Following her retirement to focus on writing, she began writing in the Welsh language even though she taught English in the education system. Lilly's first novel, Y Drudwy Dewr (English: The Brave Starling), was published in 1980, and is based on her studies of the tale of Branwen in Mabinogion's second strand. In 1981, she authored the novel Gaeaf Y Cerrig (English: Winter Of Stones), Hwyl A Helynt Calan Gaeaf (English: The Way Of The Season Of Winter) and the supernatural work Hwyl A Helynt Calan Gaeaf (English: The Way Of The Season Of Winter). Lilly won the Tir na n-Og Award in the same year.

Throughout the year of the 700th anniversary of Llywelyn ap Gruffudd's death in 1982, she was commissioned to author the novel Rwy'n Cofio dy Dad to commemorate the occasion. Lilly went on to write the children's and teenage book Y Gragen A'r Drych (English: The Shell And The Mirror) that same year. She received her second Tir na n-Og Award in 1982. In 1984 and 1987 respectively, Lilly authored Britain, Orpheus the adult book based on the Wales during the Roman era and Masgiau in English. She went on to write Tachwedd Tan Gwyllt (English: Wild Fire Of November) and the English version of that book called Treason At Trefriw were both published in 1990. In 1993, Lilly wrote On A Scaffold High and the short story collection Dynes Mewn Du (English: A Woman In Black). Overall, she published 13 books.

Lilly was an active member of the historical area society of Llanfairfechan and edited and wrote in both English and Welsh on matters of local interest. She helped the family connection to Pen y Bryn with Llywelyn the Great and his family's connection to Abergwyngregyn close to Bangor.

== Personal life ==
She was a Welsh Baptist all her life. Lilly was profoundly deaf in the final years of her life. On 5 April 2004, she died in Llanfairfechan.

== Legacy ==
D Ben Rees, writing Lilly's obituary in The Guardian, described her as "one of the most gifted children's writers of her generation, and enriched Welsh literature." The Bangor University Archives holds a collection of works related to Lilly. They include her personal papers and objects related to her career and her correspondence between the media and the printing press.
