= Gwyn Hughes Jones =

Welsh operatic tenor

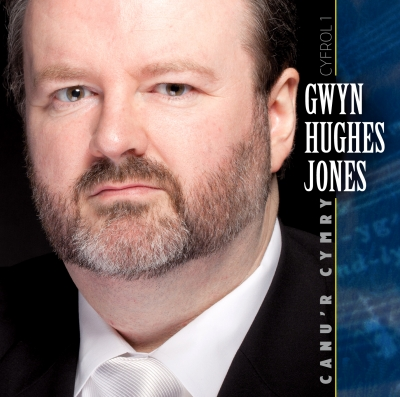
Canu'r Cymry, album cover

Gwyn Hughes Jones (born 25 October 1969) is a Welsh operatic tenor, best known for his leading roles in romantic Italian operatic repertoire.

== Early life and education ==
Gwyn Hughes Jones was born in Llanbedrgoch, Anglesey, Wales, and, after attending Ysgol Llanbedrgoch and Ysgol Gyfun Llangefni, studied at the Guildhall School of Music and Drama and the National Opera Studio.

== Career ==
Jones began his operatic career at Welsh National Opera in 1995, appearing as Ismaele in Verdi's Nabucco. He has subsequently appeared for WNO in roles such as Cavaradossi in Tosca, Don Alvaro in La forza del destino and Pinkerton in Madam Butterfly. He debuted at the Metropolitan Opera in 2001 as Ismaele.

In 2011, he appeared as Cavaradossi in Puccini's Tosca directed by Catherine Malfitano for English National Opera. In 2012, he sang Manrico in Verdi's Il trovatore directed by David McVicar., and in 2014 sang Pinkerton in Puccini's Madama Butterfly at the New York Metropolitan Opera. In 2015, he was cast as Don Alvaro in Verdi's La forza del destino by director Calixto Bieito. In 2016, he was cast as Turiddu in Mascagni's Cavalleria Rusticana by director Elijah Moshinsky.

== Recordings ==
Jones has released three solo albums for Sain Records: Gwyn Hughes Jones - Tenor (1996); Baner Ein Gwlad (1998); and Canu'r Cymry (2011). He appears as Macduff in Verdi's Macbeth for Chandos Records, released in 2014.
