= Daniel Morden =

Welsh writer and storyteller

- Born: 1964
- Occupation: Storyteller

Daniel Morden (born 1964 in Cwmbran) is a Welsh storyteller in the oral tradition and a children's writer. Morden retells traditional stories from various cultures, in particular the Celtic and the ancient Greek. He has performed all over the world, in schools and theatres, at festivals and on the radio, for example. His published books include collections of stories and legends and retellings of Greek myths, the latter in joint work with Hugh Lupton.

Morden has twice won the English-language section of the Welsh Books Council's Tir na n-Og Awards, first in 2007 for Dark Tales from the Woods, based on Welsh folktales, and then in 2013 for Tree of Leaf and Flame, a collection of stories retelling the Mabinogion.

== Books ==
- Weird Tales from the Storyteller (2003), illustrated by Jac Jones
- So Hungry (2004), ill. Suzanne Carpenter
- Dark Tales from the Woods (2005), ill. Brett Breckon
- The Other Eye (2006), ill. Jac Jones
- Tuck Your Vest In (2008), ill. Suzanne Carpenter
- Fearless (2009)
- Tree of Leaf and Flame (2012), ill. Brett Breckon

With Hugh Lupton

Hugh Lupton and Morden have written several volumes retelling ancient Greek stories.

- The Adventures of Odysseus (2006), illustrated by Christina Balit
- The Adventures of Achilles (2012), ill. Carole Hénaff
- Theseus and the Minotaur (2013), ill. Carole Hénaff
- Orpheus and Eurydice (2013), ill. Carole Hénaff
- Demeter and Persephone (2013), ill. Carole Hénaff
