= Mary Vaughan Jones Award =

The Mary Vaughan Jones Award is a Welsh children's literature award. The Mary Vaughan Jones Trophy is awarded every three years to an author who has made a substantial contribution to children's literature over a number of years. It was established in memory of Mary Vaughan Jones's contribution to the field of children's books in Wales.

== Awards ==
- 1985 - Ifor Owen
- 1988 - Emily Huws
- 1991 - T. Llew Jones
- 1994 - W.J. Jones
- 1997 - Roger Boore
- 2000 - J. Selwyn Lloyd
- 2003 - Elfyn Pritchard
- 2006 - Mair Wynn Hughes
- 2009 - Angharad Tomos
- 2012 - Jac Jones
- 2015 - Siân Lewis
- 2018 - Gareth F. Williams
- 2021 - Menna Lloyd Williams
