= Graham Howells =

Graham Howells is a Welsh illustrator and children's author. Howells was born in Antwerp, Belgium, and lived in Bahrain, Malaysia, Singapore, and Germany, before moving to Pembrokeshire, west Wales.

He has illustrated books for many other authors in Europe and the US, as well as writing and illustrating his own. His preferred themes are myth and magic, and many of his books are available in both Welsh and English. He has also produced artwork for animation and board games.

Howells won the 2009 English Tir na n-Og Award for his book Merlin’s Magical Creatures (Pont Books).

== Work ==
=== Written and illustrated ===
- The Midwinter Wizard
- Dewin Y Gaeaf
- The Nightmare Gift
- Hunllef o Anrheg
- The Lonely Bwbach
- Y Bwbach Bach Unig
- Merlin’s Magical Creatures (Pont Books)
- Creaduriaid Hud Myrddin Ddewin (Gwasg Gomer)
- Merlin Awakes (Pont Books)
- Diwrnod i’r Dewin (Gwasg Gomer)
- Mr. Barafundle and the Rock Dragon (co-author)

=== Illustrated ===
- Danger Island
- Dragon Masters series
- Tales of King Arthur
- Myths and Legends
- Wicked Wales series
- Beowulf and Grendel
- The Story of King Arthur
- Stories of Welsh Life: Rebecca’s Daughter (Gwasg Carreg Gwalch)
- Stories of Welsh Life: Captain Dan and the Ruby Ann (Gwasg Carreg Gwalch)
- Straeon Bywyd Cymru: Capten Dan a’r Ruby Ann (Gwasg Carreg Gwalch)
- Straeon Bywyd Cymru: Merch Beca (Gwasg Carreg Gwalch)
- Tales from Wales: Stories of the Stones (Gwasg Carreg Gwalch)
- Tales from Wales: Fairy Tales from Wales (Gwasg Carreg Gwalch)
- Straeon Plant Cymru: Meini Mawr Cymru (Gwasg Carreg Gwalch)
- Straeon Plant Cymru: Straeon y Tylwyth Teg (Gwasg Carreg Gwalch)
- Llyfrau Hwyl Dwli/Dwli’s Fun Books: Concro’r Byd/Around the World (Gwasg Gomer)
- Llyfrau Hwyl Dwli/Dwli’s Fun Books: Ar Daith/On the Move (Gwasg Gomer)
- Llyfrau Hwyl Dwli/Dwli’s Fun Books: Anifeiliaid/Animals (Gwasg Gomer)
- Llyfrau Hwyl Dwli/Dwli’s Fun Books: Cymru Gyfan/Wales All Over (Gwasg Gomer)
- Spellmakers (Pont Books)
- Swynion (Gwasg Gomer)
- Hiding Hopcyn (Pont Books)
- Melangell (Gwasg Gomer)
- Fabulous Celtic Beasts (Pont Books)
- Creaduriaid Rhyfeddol (Gwasg Gomer)
