= Manon Steffan Ros =

Welsh writer and musician (born 1983)

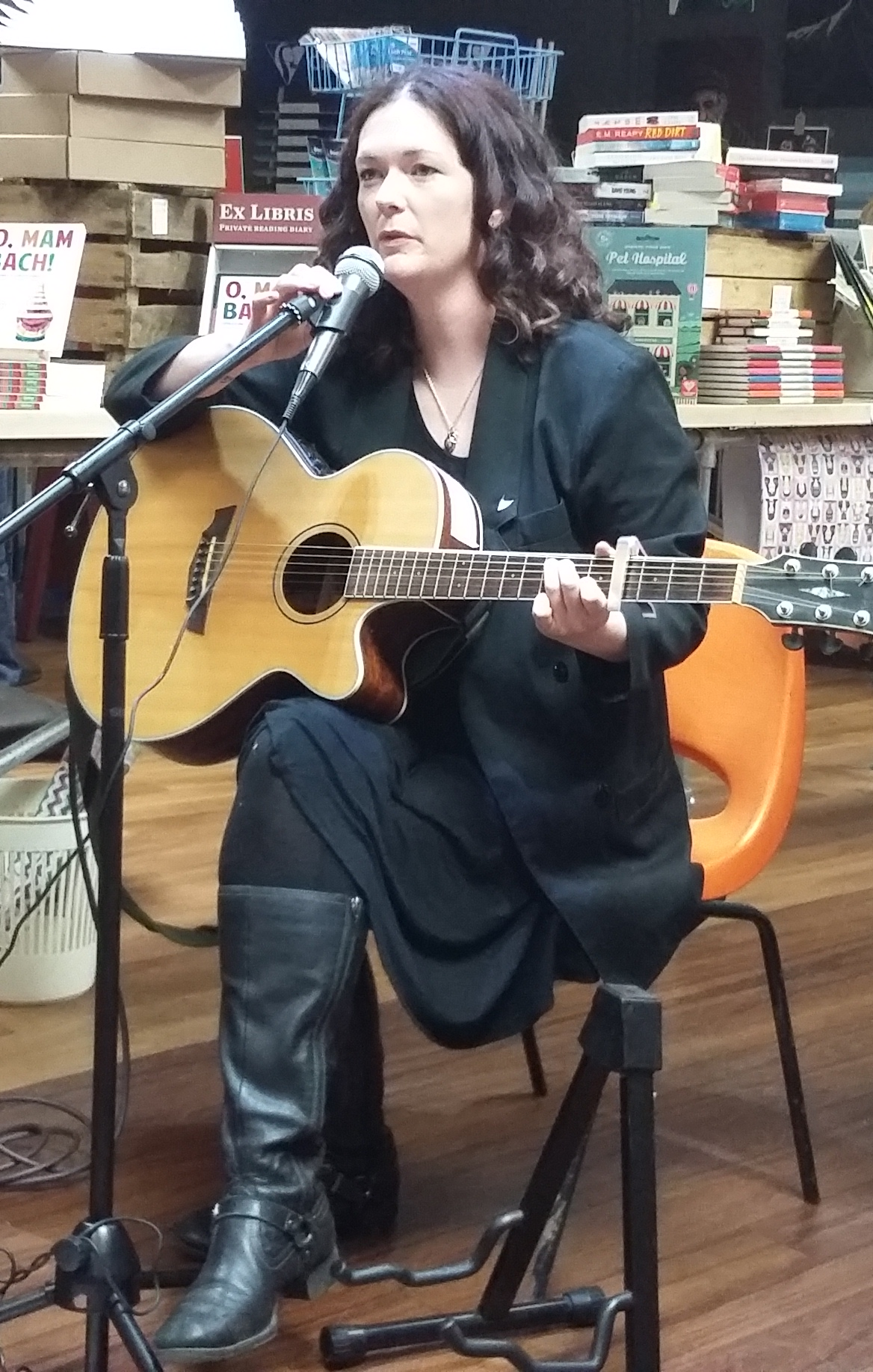
- Manon Steffan Ros in March 2017
- Born: 19 January 1983 (age 43); Rhiwlas, Llanddeiniolen, Wales
- Occupation: Author
- Writing career
- Language: Welsh; English
- Years active: 2008–present
- Notable awards: National Eisteddfod Prose and Drama Medals; Tir na n-Og Award; Yoto Carnegie Medal
- Website: ylolfa.com/authors/393/manon-steffan-ros

Manon Steffan Ros (born 19 January 1983) is a Welsh novelist, playwright, games author, scriptwriter and musician (being one half of the acoustic duo 'Blodau Gwylltion'). She is the author of over twenty children's books and three novels for adults, all in Welsh. Her award-winning novel Blasu has been translated (by the author) into English, under the title of The Seasoning. In May 2021 she was described as "arguably the most successful novelist writing in Welsh at the moment". In June 2023 she won the Yoto Carnegie Medal for The Blue Book of Nebo, her English translation of her novel Llyfr Glas Nebo.

== Biography ==
Ros was born in Rhiwlas to musician Steve Eaves. She attended Ysgol Rhiwlas and Ysgol Dyffryn Ogwen in Bethesda. She lives in Tywyn.

She is twice winner of the Drama Medal for playwrights at the National Eisteddfod of Wales and won the Prose Medal in 2018. In June 2017, she won the prestigious Tir na n-Og Award for the third time, in the primary school category, presented by the Welsh Books Council to honour the year's best Welsh-language book.

She won the Prose Medal at the National Eisteddfod 2018, for her work Llyfr Glas Nebo, written under her nom de plume Aleloia. The novel won three Wales Book of the Year awards the following year (the Fiction category, People's Choice Award, and the overall Welsh-language award), and was adapted into a touring theatre production by Frân Wen in 2020. It has been translated into Arabic, Polish, Catalan, French and English.

In 2023, Ros' own English translation of the novel, The Blue Book of Nebo, became the first novel in translation to win the prestigious Yoto Carnegie Medal for Fiction in the 87-year history of the award. The novel is told in dual narrative by a boy and his mother navigating a post-apocalyptic world and depicts Welsh identity and culture.

== Awards ==
- 2005 and 2006 National Eisteddfod's Drama Medal;
- 2010, 2012, 2017 and 2019 Welsh-language Tir na n-Og Award;
- 2018 Prose Medal at the National Eisteddfod of Wales for Llyfr Glas Nebo.
- 2023 Yoto Carnegie Medal for The Blue Book of Nebo, her English translation of Llyfr Glas Nebo.
- 2024 Honorary Doctorate - Bangor University for contribution to Welsh culture, language, music, and the arts.

== Bibliography ==
- Trwy'r Darlun, Cyfres yr Onnen (transl. Through the Drawing, The Ash Series) (Y Lolfa, 2008)
- Fel Aderyn (transl. Like a Bird) (Y Lolfa, 2009)
- Trwy'r Tonnau, Cyfres yr Onnen (transl. Through the Waves, The Onnen Series) (Y Lolfa, 2009)
- Bwystfilod a Bwganod, Cyfres yr Onnen (transl. Beasts and Ghosts, The Ash Series) (Y Lolfa, 2010)
- Prism, Cyfres yr Onnen (transl. Prism, The Ash Series) (Y Lolfa, 2011)
- Hunllef, Stori Sydyn (transl. Nightmare, Quick Reads) (Y Lolfa, 2012)
- Blasu (transl. Taste) (Y Lolfa, 2012), adapted for English as The Seasoning (Honno Press, 2015)
- Inc, Stori Sydyn (transl. Inc, Quick Reads) (Y Lolfa, 2013)
- Baba Hyll (transl. Ugly Baba) (Y Lolfa, 2013)
- Dafydd a Dad (transl. David and dad) (Y Lolfa, 2013)
- Llanw (transl. Tide) (Y Lolfa, 2014)
- Al, Cyfres Copa (Y Lolfa, 2014)
- Y Dyn Gwyrdd a'r Coed Teg, Cyfres Cloch (transl. The Green Man and the Fairwood, Bell Series) (Gwasg Carreg Gwalch, 2014)
- Diffodd y Golau, Cyfres y Geiniog, adapted for English as Turn Out the Light, The Penny Series (Canolfan Peniarth, 2015)
- Annwyl Mr Rowlands, Cyfres y Geiniog, adapted to English as Dear Mr Rowlands, The Penny Series (Canolfan Peniarth, 2015)
- Two Faces (Y Lolfa, 2016), adapted for Welsh by Elin Meek (Canolfan Peniarth, 2018)
- Pluen (transl. Feather) (Y Lolfa, 2016)
- Golygon (transl. Views) (Y Lolfa, 2017)
- Fi a Joe Allen (transl. Me and Joe Allen) (Y Lolfa, 2018)
- Llyfr Glas Nebo (transl. Blue Book of Nebo) (Y Lolfa, 2018), adapted for English by the author as The Blue Book of Nebo (Firefly Press/Deep Vellum, 2021)
- Y Stelciwr, Stori Sydyn (transl. The Stalker, Quick Story) (Y Lolfa, 2017)

The Entertaining Characters series:

- Sara Sero, Cyfres Cymeriadau Difyr (transl. Sara Zero, Entertaining Characters Series) (Canolfan Peniarth, 2018)
- Alun Un, Cyfres Cymeriadau Difyr (transl. Alun One, Entertaining Characters Series) (Canolfan Peniarth, 2018)
- Deio Dau, Cyfres Cymeriadau Difyr (transl. Deio Two, Entertaining Characters Series) (Canolfan Peniarth, 2018)
- Twm Tri, Cyfres Cymeriadau Difyr (transl. Tom Three, Entertaining Characters Series) (Canolfan Peniarth, 2018)
- Pedr Pedwar, Cyfres Cymeriadau Difyr (transl. Peter Four, Entertaining Characters Series) (Canolfan Peniarth, 2018)
- Poli Pump, Cyfres Cymeriadau Difyr (transl. Polly Five, Entertaining Characters Series) (Canolfan Peniarth, 2018)
- Cati Chwech, Cyfres Cymeriadau Difyr (transl. Cati Six, Entertaining Characters Series) (Canolfan Peniarth, 2018)
- Sami Saith, Cyfres Cymeriadau Difyr (transl. Sami Seven, Entertaining Characters Series) (Canolfan Peniarth, 2018)
- Wali Wyth, Cyfres Cymeriadau Difyr (transl. Wali Eight, Entertaining Characters Series) (Canolfan Peniarth, 2018)
- Dilys Deg, Cyfres Cymeriadau Difyr (transl. Dilys Ten, Entertaining Characters Series) (Canolfan Peniarth, 2018)
- Rhifau Coll, Cyfres Cymeriadau Difyr (transl. Lost Numbers, Entertaining Characters Series) (Canolfan Peniarth, 2018)
- Dyblu, Cyfres Cymeriadau Difyr (transl. Doubles, Entertaining Characters Series) (Canolfan Peniarth, 2018)
- Odrifau ac Eilrifau, Cyfres Cymeriadau Difyr (transl. Odd numbers & Even numbers, Entertaining Characters Series) (Canolfan Peniarth, 2018)
- Rhifo 'Nôl ac Ymlaen, Cyfres Cymeriadau Difyr (transl. Counting Back and Forth, Entertaining Characters Series) (Canolfan Peniarth, 2018)

== See also ==
- Welsh-language literature
- Welsh literature
- Celtic Revival
- Culture of Wales
