= Marian Delyth =

Welsh photographer and designer (born 1954)

Marian Delyth Jones (born March 1954) is a Welsh photographer and designer.

== Early life ==
Marian Delyth Jones was born in March 1954, in Aberystwyth, and was educated at Ysgol Gymraeg ac Ysgol Ramadeg Ardwyn, Aberystwyth. She took her first photograph at age ten.

== Career ==
Since 1982, she has worked from her studio in Blaenplwyf, near Aberystwyth.

After leaving college, she worked with an advertising company for a while before returning to live in Ceredigion. Marian's work can be seen in a number of publications and she has won several awards. In 2000, she began to focus on her photography – on commissions, personal work, workshops and teaching from time to time.

Starting in 2014, an exhibition of her work entitled "60: Images by Marian Delyth" went on display at the National Library of Wales. The exhibition wes commissioned to celebrate her 60th birthday.

== Publications ==
- Cymru: Y 100 lle i’w gweld cyn marw; Y Lolfa (2009)
