= Ysgol Gyfun Llangefni =

Comprehensive school in Anglesey, Wales

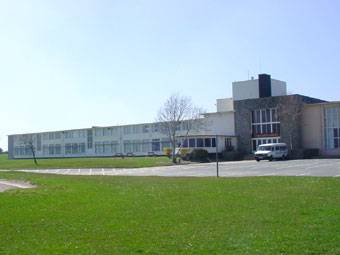
- View of Ysgol Gyfun Llangefni from the front of the school.

Location
- Penrallt; Llangefni, Anglesey, LL77 7NG; Wales; 53.2561°N 4.3203°W

Information
- Former names: Llangefni County School, Llangefni Grammar school
- School type: Comprehensive
- Motto: Welsh: Gorau Cynnydd Cadw Moes (Courtesy paves the way to success)
- Established: 1953; 73 years ago as a comprehensive. 1897; 129 years ago as a grammar school.
- Status: Open
- Local authority: Isle of Anglesey County Council
- Department for Education URN: 401667 Tables
- Head teacher: Huw Davies
- Staff: 80 (approx)
- Grades: 7-13
- Gender: Coeducational
- Age: 11 to 18
- Enrolment: 719 (2023)
- Sixth form students: 91
- Student to teacher ratio: 16.6
- Language: English / Welsh
- Hours in school day: 8.50am to 3.25pm
- Campus type: Suburban
- Houses: Mona; Menai; Aethwy; Celyn
- Colours: Burgundy, Dark Blue, Mid Blue and Yellow
- Website: www.ysgolgyfunllangefni.org
- Last updated: March 21, 2023

Ysgol Gyfun Llangefni is a bilingual community comprehensive school for pupils aged 11 to 18 years old located in Llangefni, Anglesey. Pupils come from the town of Llangefni and the surrounding villages and rural areas. The school opened in 1953 and currently has 719 students on roll.

== History ==
Llangefni County School opened in 1897 but was superseded by Ysgol Gyfun Llangefni, County Secondary School.

Llangefni Grammar School

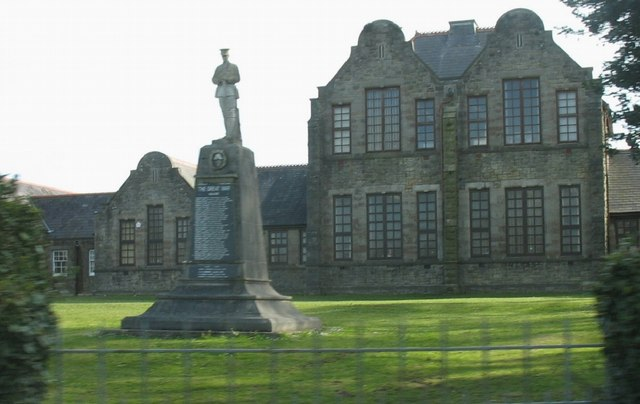
Image of school taken from the road.

The title ‘County School’ already existed and was used by the school prior to the Education Act 1944. However, the Act insisted on the term being used for all LEA maintained primary and secondary schools.

In 1947 the school was inspected and the HMI report was not favorable. The report stated that ‘there is nothing in this school on which the eye can alight with pleasure’, The school site had been significantly affected by a fire in 1939, but despite the fact that the science laboratories and the domestic science room had been destroyed, the plans to re-build the school (submitted in 1939) had been deferred as a consequence of the war and the lack of money, labour, and materials.

Ysgol Gyfun Llangefni was built due to Anglesey’s prominent role as a pioneer of comprehensive schooling. Construction began in 1950 and was completed by 1953. The school first opened its doors in 1953 to all the children of secondary school age in the catchment area with a then capacity of 842.

== School Ethos ==
"Gorau Cynnydd Cadw Moes" translates to 'Courtesy paves the way to success'. Inclusion, a Welsh ethos, diversity, equality, respect and empathy are the values upheld at the school.

== School site ==
The school is located on a single campus.

There is a leisure centre neighbouring the school to the left called Plas Arthur and to the right of the school is Canolfan Addysg y Bont, a school for young people with special educational needs. The school shares some facilities with both establishments.

== Facilities ==
- A School hall with sound and vision equipment.
- An outdoor steel dining canopy. A covered space outside where students can sit to eat during their lunch period.
- A school canteen with indoor dining facilities.
- A covered Multi-Use Games Area. Used for a variety of different sporting activities.
- A large floodlit 3G artificial turf sports pitch. (Shared with Plas Arthur leisure centre)
- 2 traditional school gyms with climbing equipment, ropes, gymnastic apparatus and crash mats.
- Playing fields used for rugby, football, and athletics.
- Fenced outdoor tennis courts.
- 5 full ICT suites used by various departments.
- 2 Design & Technology multi use workshops.
- 1 Food Technology home economics suite facilitating catering and textile technology lessons.
- 1 Music room.
- 8 Science labs.
- A video conferencing room used for meetings and for pupils to follow curriculum courses offered off site.
- The Noddfa support centre. A unit set up for pupils with emotional needs to receive purposeful interventions and support.
- A sixth form common room.
- A school garden. The garden spans over an acre of land and is set out in specific zones: a growing zone, sensory garden zone, meadow zone, wildlife zone and micro forest where over 500 trees have been planted by the pupils.

== Curriculum ==
Pupils currently follow the Curriculum for Wales (2022–present) from year 7 through 8.

The school offers a variety of subjects at GCSE and at AS/A2 levels, the Welsh Baccalaureate, and some vocational courses. The school also offers additional subjects taught at other sites through the local educational consortium.

Subjects offered at Ysgol Gyfun Llangefni in Key stage 4
Courses taught at the school	Local educational consortium courses
Art and Design	Construction Level 1
Business Studies	Construction Level 2
Computer Science	Public Services Level 2
Design and Technology	Automotive Engineering Level 1
Digital Technology	Vehicle Technology Level 2
Drama	Engineering Level 1
English	Engineering Level 2
Financial Literacy	Hair and Beauty Level 1
Food and Nutrition	Hair Dressing Level 2
French
Geography
Health and Social Care
History
Mathematics
Mathematics Numeracy
Music
Physical Education
Religious Studies
Science
Triple Science
Welsh
Welsh Baccalaureate

Subjects offered at Ysgol Gyfun Llangefni in the Sixth form
Courses taught at the school	Local educational consortium courses
Art and Design	Built Environment
Biology	Business Studies
Chemistry	Design and Technology
Computer Science	Drama
Digital Technology	French
English Literature	Further Pure Mathematics
Financial Studies	Geography
History	German
Mathematics	Health and Social
Medical Science	Law
Physics	Mechanical Engineering
Physical Education	Media - Games Design
Welsh	Music
Welsh Baccalaureate	Politics and Government
	Tourism
	Welsh Second Language

== School houses ==
The school's four houses annually compete in the school sports day and school Eisteddfod. Each student and member of staff is placed in a school house.

The school houses

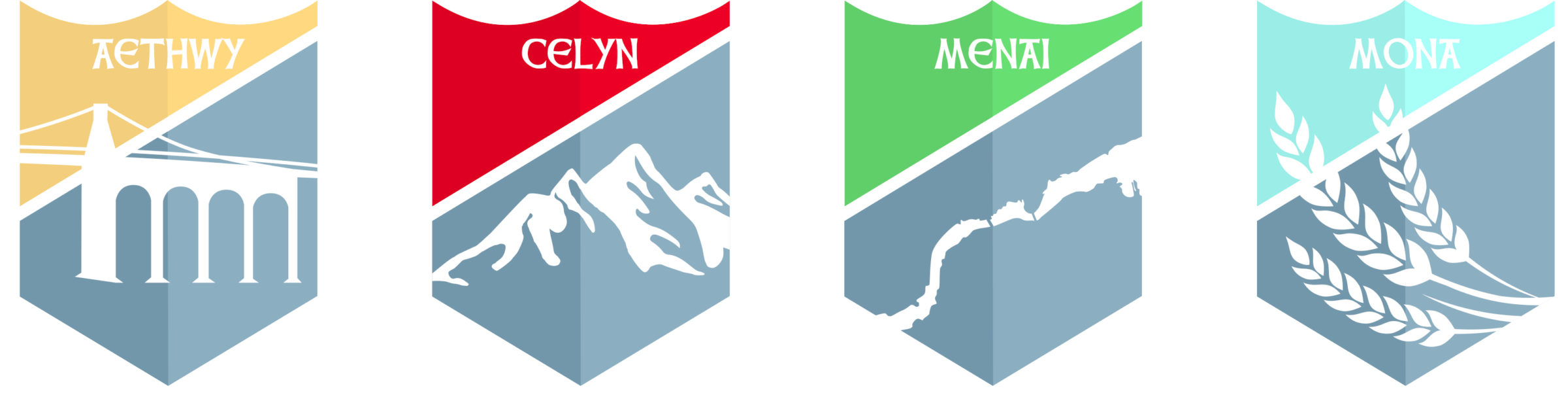
The four house emblems of Ysgol Gyfun Llangefni

School Houses
House Name	House Colour
Mona	
Menai	
Aethwy	
Celyn	

== Extra-curricular activities ==
The school offers a range of extra-curricular activities including but not limited to Team and individual sports, 5x60, Duke of Edinburgh Award, Charity work, Book club, Chess club, Lego club, F1 in Schools team, Games and socialising club, Instrumental lessons and drama.

During the summer term year 7 pupils enjoy the "Crafnant Experience" where they take part in outdoor activities such as kayaking, mountain biking, rock climbing and an adventure trail before camping overnight.

== School catchment area ==
The school serves a central area of Anglesey that includes Bodorgan, Bodffordd, Gaerwen, Llanbedrgoch, Llangefni, Llangristiolus, Talwrn and Dwyran.

The following is a list of primary schools that fall within the boundary of Ysgol Gyfun Llangefni's catchment area.

- Ysgol Gymuned Bodffordd
- Ysgol Esceifiog (Gaerwen)
- Ysgol Gynradd Llanbedrgoch
- Ysgol y Graig, Llangefni
- Ysgol Henblas
- Ysgol Talwrn
- Ysgol Corn Hir, Llangefni
- Ysgol Santes Dwynwen

The school also accepts pupils from outside of the catchment area providing numbers do not exceed the admission limit.

== Notable alumni ==
- Naomi Watts - Hollywood actress and Oscar nominee
- Gwyn Hughes Jones - Opera Tenor
- Hywel Gwynfryn - TV and radio personality
- Hugh Griffith - Oscar-winning actor
- Gabriel Fielding - English novelist
- Osian Roberts - Welsh football coach and former player
- Wilfred Mitford Davies - Welsh artist and publisher
- Meinir Gwilym - Welsh-language pop and folk singer
- Jac Jones - Welsh children's book illustrator.
- Owen Dryhurst Roberts - Pioneer of Welsh-language television.
- Wilf Roberts - Welsh painter and educator.
- Harri Pritchard-Jones - English-born Welsh language author, critic, and psychiatrist.
- Rhiannon Ifans - Welsh academic specialising in English, Medieval and Welsh literature.

== Notable staff members ==
- Sonia Edwards - Bilingual novelist, taught Welsh at the school.
- Gerald Morgan - Historian and Welsh author, served as headteacher from 1966 until 1973.
- George Fisher (dramatist) - Dramatist, head of mathematics and deputy headmaster at the school.
- Ernest Zobole - Welsh painter and art teacher, taught art at the school from 1953 to 1958.
- Gwilym Prichard - Landscape artist, taught craft at the school from 1954 until 1965.
- Rachel Barrett - Welsh suffragette and newspaper editor, taught science at the school.

== Former headteachers ==
Name	Years
Clive Thomas	2013-2019
Haydn Davies	2003-2013
Huw Roberts	1982-2003
Gerald Morgan	1966-1973
E. D. Davies	?-1966
Samuel James Evans	1897-1935

== Filming Location ==
Ysgol Gyfun Llangefni has been the filming location for Welsh soap opera Rownd a Rownd for a number of years. Scenes requiring a school setting for the fictional 'Ysgol Glanrafon' secondary school are filmed at the school.

== Welsh language ==
Welsh Government defines the school as a bilingual secondary school Category 2B, which means that, at least 80% of subjects (excluding Welsh and English) are taught through the medium of Welsh but are also taught through the medium of English. However, the majority are taught through the medium of Welsh. Approximately 87% of pupils study Welsh as a first language.

As of January 2023, 78.5% of the school's pupils spoke Welsh at home.

== See also ==
- Category:People educated at Ysgol Gyfun Llangefni
