= Myrddin ap Dafydd =

Welsh editor and writer

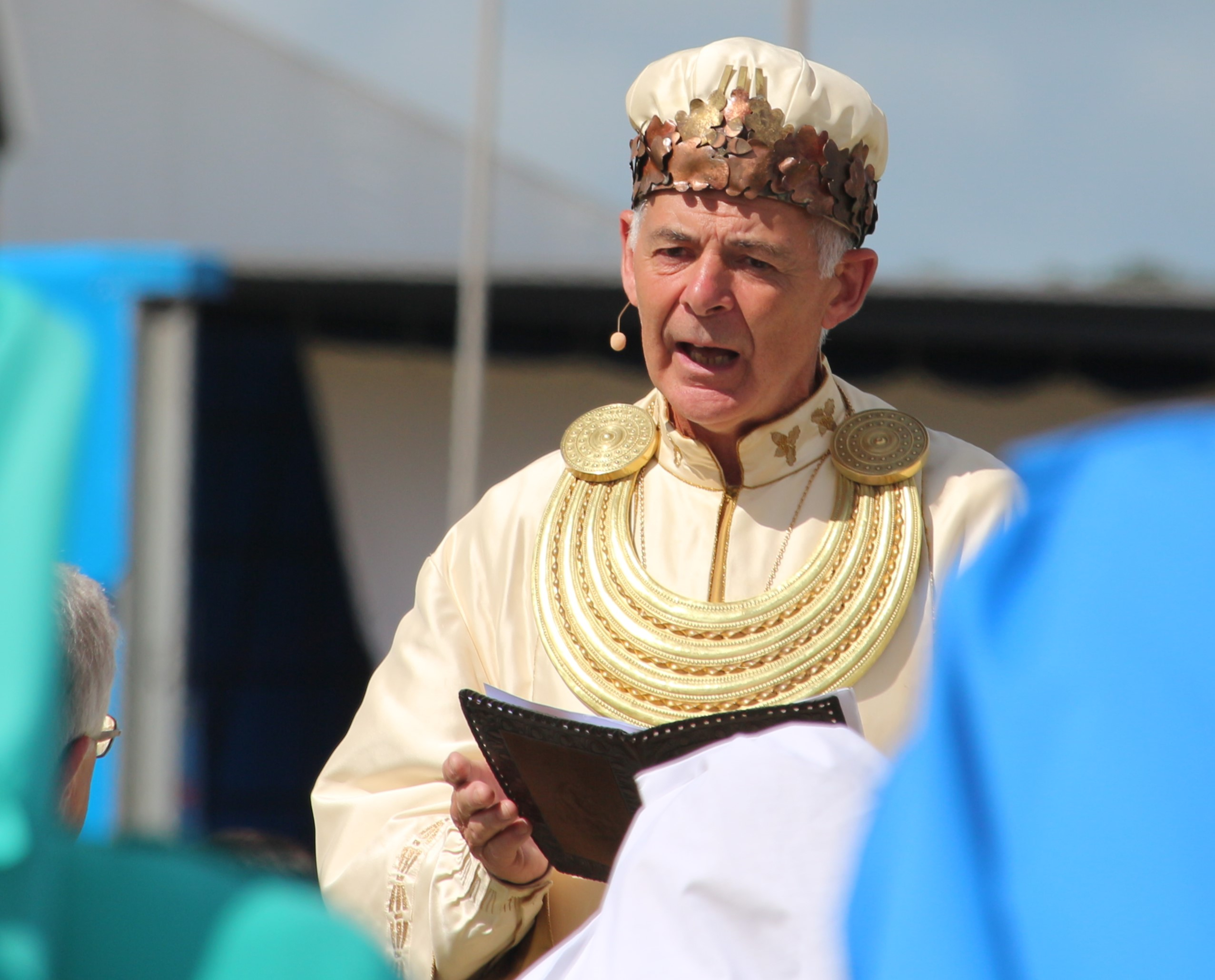
- Myrddin at the National Eisteddfod of Wales in 2022
- Born: 25 July 1956 (age 69) Llanrwst, Conwy, Wales
- Occupation: Writer, publisher and Archdruid
- Language: Welsh, English
- Spouse: Llio Meirion
- Children: 5

Myrddin ap Dafydd (born 25 July 1956) is a Welsh writer, publisher and chaired bard. In 2018 he was elected Archdruid of Wales.

Myrddin ap Dafydd was born in Llanrwst, north Wales. He was educated in the town's schools and at the University College Wales, Aberystwyth.

He founded the Gwasg Carreg Gwalch publishing company in 1980. He is also a director of the Cwrw Llŷn brewery in Nefyn and of the Oriel Tonnau art gallery in Pwllheli. He has attended Welsh independence marches.

== Work ==
=== Music and poetry ===
- Llyfr Caneuon Tecwyn y Tractor (Rhys Parry, Myrddin ap Dafydd, Trefn. Guto Pryderi Puw), June 1998, (Gwasg Carreg Gwalch)
- Pen Draw'r Tir, November 1998, (Gwasg Carreg Gwalch)
- Denu Plant at Farddoniaeth – Pedwar Pŵdl Pinc a'r Tei yn yr Inc, February 1999, (Gwasg Carreg Gwalch)
- Denu Plant at Farddoniaeth – Cerddi ac Ymarferion: Cyfrol 1 – Armadilo ar ..., September 2000, (Gwasg Carreg Gwalch)
- Jam Coch Mewn Pwdin Reis, November 2000, (Hughes a'i Fab)
- Syched am Sycharth – Cerddi a Chwedlau Taith Glyndŵr, July 2001, (Gwasg Carreg Gwalch)
- Llyfrau Lloerig: Y Llew Go Lew, January 2002, (Gwasg Carreg Gwalch)
- Clawdd Cam, October 2003, (Gwasg Carreg Gwalch)
- Clywed Cynghanedd: Cwrs Cerdd Dafod, 1994, Reprinting July 2003, (Gwasg Carreg Gwalch)
- Cerddi Cyntaf, September 2006, (Gwasg Carreg Gwalch)

=== Welsh children's books ===
- Cyfres y Llwyfan: Ar y Gêm, January 1982, (Gwasg Carreg Gwalch)
- Cyfres y Llwyfan: Ail Godi'r To, January 1986, (Gwasg Carreg Gwalch)
- Gweld Cymru – Hwyl wrth Ddod i Adnabod Gwlad, May 1998, (Gwasg Carreg Gwalch)
- Golau ar y Goeden – Arferion, Straeon a Cherddi Nadolig, Medi 2000, (Gwasg Carreg Gwalch)
- Syniad Da Iawn! (Sioned Wyn Huws, Myrddin ap Dafydd, Haf Llywelyn, Martin Morgan, Eleri Llewelyn Morris), Tachwedd 2000, (Gwasg Carreg Gwalch)
- Cyfres Mewnwr a Maswr: 1. Brwydr y Brodyr, June 2004, (Gwasg Carreg Gwalch)
- Cyfres Straeon Plant Cymru 1: Straeon y Tylwyth Teg, May 2005, (Gwasg Carreg Gwalch)
- Cyfres Straeon Plant Cymru 2: Ogof y Brenin Arthur, May 2005, (Gwasg Carreg Gwalch)
- Cyfres Straeon Plant Cymru 3: Gelert, Y Ci Ffyddlon, May 2005, (Gwasg Carreg Gwalch)
- Cyfres Straeon Plant Cymru 4: Barti Ddu Môr-leidr o Gymru, May 2005, (Gwasg Carreg Gwalch)
- Odl-Dodl Dolig, Medi 2006, (Gwasg Carreg Gwalch)
- Cyfres Straeon Plant Cymru 5: Meini Mawr Cymru, April 2007, (Gwasg Carreg Gwalch)
- Cyfres Straeon Plant Cymru 6: Draig Goch Cymru, April 2007, (Gwasg Carreg Gwalch)

=== English children's books ===
- Tales from Wales 1: Fairy Tales from Wales, May 2005, (Gwasg Carreg Gwalch)
- Tales from Wales 2: King Arthur's Cave, May 2005, (Gwasg Carreg Gwalch)
- Tales from Wales 3: The Faithful Dog Gelert, May 2005, (Gwasg Carreg Gwalch)
- Tales from Wales 4: Black Bart, May 2005, (Gwasg Carreg Gwalch)
- Tales from Wales 5: Stories of the Stones, April 2007, (Gwasg Carreg Gwalch)
- Tales from Wales 6: The Red Dragon of Wales, April 2007, (Gwasg Carreg Gwalch)

=== Adults' books ===
- Llyfrau Llafar Gwlad: 37. Enwau Cymraeg ar Dai, July 1997, (Gwasg Carreg Gwalch)
- Circular Walks e.g. "Carmarthenshire Coast and Gower Circular Walks"
- The "Welcome to..." series, e.g. "Welcome to Bermo (Barmouth)"

=== Albums ===
Caneuon Tecwyn y Tractor, July 2004, (Sain Records)

== Awards and honours ==
- 1974 Bardic chair, Urdd National Eisteddfod
- 1990 Bardic chair, National Eisteddfod, Cwm Rhymni
- 2000 Welsh-language Children's Poet Laureate, Welsh Books Council
- 2001 Tir na n-Og Award for the children's book Jam Coch Mewn Pwdin Reis
- 2002 Bardic chair, National Eisteddfod, St Davids
- 2018 Archdruid of Wales

Preceded by Geraint Lloyd Owen	Archdderwydd of the National Eisteddfod of Wales; 2019–2024	Succeeded by Mererid Hopwood
