= Lleucu Roberts =

Welsh author

- Born: 27 September 1964 (age 61) Aberystwyth, Wales
- Language: Welsh and English
- Education: Aberystwyth University
- Genre: Children's literature
- Notable works: Stuff Guto S Thomas; Well, Little Wales! Some Kind of Insult
- Notable awards: Tir na n-Og Award (2011)

Lleucu Roberts (born 27 September 1964) is a Welsh author.

== Biography ==
Born in Aberystwyth, she grew up in Ceredigion's Bow Street, taking courses at Rhydypennau Primary School, Penweddig Comprehensive School, and Aberystwyth University.

In 2011 she won a Tir na n-Og Award for her novel Stuff Guto S Thomas. She went on to win the Daniel Owen Memorial Prize and the Prose Medal at the Carmarthenshire National Eisteddfod 2014, becoming the first person to win the two main prose prizes in the same year. Roberts also writes radio and television scripts.

Roberts won the Daniel Owen Memorial Prize for a second time, at the 2021 Eisteddfod AmGen, for her novel Hannah-Jane.

Her works include Songs of Peace (1991), Turning a Deaf Ear (2005), Dear Little Spot (Annwyl Smotyn Bach) (2008), The Girl on the Road (2009), Stuff- Guto S. Tomos (2010), Well, Little Wales! (2011) and Some Kind of Insult (2012). She currently lives in Rhostryfan, Gwynedd, with her husband and two daughters and sons.
