= Haf Llewelyn =

Welsh author and teacher

Haf Llewelyn (born June 17, 1964) is a Welsh author and teacher. She has written over 30 books for children and adults.

== Biography ==
Llewelyn was born and raised on a mountain farm in Cwm Nantcol, Ardudwy with her four siblings, and she currently lives in Llanuwchllyn, near Bala. She attended Ysgol Gynradd Llanbedr (primary school) and Ysgol Ardudwy (secondary school) in Harlech.

Llewelyn worked as a primary school teacher and on projects with Literature Wales. She won the 2014 Tir na n-Og Award for her book Diffodd y Sêr, about the Welsh poet Hedd Wyn. In 2009, she published Llwybrau, her first volume of poetry and in 2010, she published her first novel for adults, Y Graig. In 2025, Llewlyn served as an adjudicator for the Daniel Owen Memorial Medal at the National Eisteddfod of Wales.

== Honors ==
- 2014 - Tir na n-Og Award for Diffodd y Sêr

== Selected publications ==
- O! Mae Mam yn Flin (Gwasg Gwynedd, 1991)
- Abi-Clec (Gwasg Carreg Gwalch, 2002)
- Stwffia dy ffon hoci! (Gwasg Gwynedd, 2006)
- Llwybrau (Cyhoeddiadau Barddas, 2009)
- Y Graig (Y Lolfa, 2010)
- Llond Drôr o Ddeinosoriaid (Cyhoeddiadau Barddas, 2011)
- Mab y Cychwr (Y Lolfa, 2012)
- Hei Now!, Now! (Gwasg Gomer, 2012)
- Diffodd y Sêr (Y Lolfa, 2013)
  - An Empty Chair: The Story of Welsh First World War Poet Hedd Wyn (Y Lolfa 2017)
- Y Traeth (Y Lolfa, 2016)
- Pwyth (Y Lolfa, 2019)
- Gwenwyn a Gwasgod Felen (Gwasg Carreg Gwalch, 2020)
- Ga' i Fyw Adra? (Gwasg Carreg Gwalch, 2022)
- Dros y Môr a'r Mynyddoedd: Straeon Merched Dewr y Celtiaid (Gwasg Carreg Gwalch, 2023)
- Salem (Y Lolfa, 2023)
