= Irma Chilton =

Welsh children's writer (1930–1990)

- Born: Mair Elizabeth Irma Evans; 12 November 1930; Loughor, Glamorgan, Wales
- Died: 1 December 1990 (aged 60); Wrexham, Wales
- Occupation: Writer
- Spouse: Harry Chilton
- Writing career
- Language: English, Welsh
- Genre: Fiction for children

Irma Chilton (born Mair Elizabeth Irma Evans, 12 November 1930 – 1 December 1990), also known as I. M. Chilton, was a Welsh children's writer in the English and Welsh languages. She was a recipient of the Tir na n-Og Award presented by the Welsh Books Council, and of eisteddfod prizes.

== Early life and education ==
Irma Evans was born in Loughor, in Glamorgan, close to the border with Carmarthen. Her parents were Iorworth Evans, a furnaceman, and his wife, Esther Jane Muxworthy Evans. She attended the University of Wales, where she earned a bachelor's degree in 1951.

== Writing ==
Chilton was a teacher. Chilton's first book, Take Away The Flowers & Fuller's World, combined two science fiction stories about a pilot character named Tom Davies; Heinemann published the volume in 1967. She wrote children's books in both English and Welsh and won eisteddfod prizes for them. They include the novels String of Time (1968, a time-travel story later retitled Nightmare (1972), Goldie (1969, about a "calf-like" space creature who lands on an English farm), The Time Button (1970), Strangers Up the Lane (1971), Rhwng cwsg ac effro (1975), The Magic Cauldron and Other Folktales (1976), A Spray of Leaves (1977), The Witch (1979), The Prize (1983), Y Wobr (1984), and Y Peiriant Amser (1986, about time-travelling children). In 1989, she took the Crown for prose at the National Eisteddfod in Llanrwst, for Mochyn Gwydr.

== Personal life and legacy ==
Irma Evans married a chemist, Harry Chilton; they had two children, Dafydd and Rhiannon. She died in 1990, aged 60. Chilton is commemorated in the name of the Irma Chilton Bursary, an annual memorial prize given to aspiring children's novelists by the Welsh Arts Council. Winners of it have included Jennifer Sullivan.

Irma Chilton's son Dafydd Chilton also writes fiction for young readers.
