= Sonia Edwards =

Welsh poet and writer

- Born: Sonia Edwards; Cemaes

Sonia Edwards is a Welsh poet and writer who writes primarily in Welsh. She is a recipient of the Tir na n-Og Award.

== Life ==
Edwards was born in Cemaes on the island of Anglesey. She is known as a writer of books in Welsh although she also translates her own books into English. She won the Arts Council Book of the Year Award in 1996. In 1999 she won the Prose Medal at the National Eisteddfod on Anglesey. In 2017 she won it again at the Anglesey Eisteddfod.

She taught Welsh at Ysgol Gyfun Llangefni, a school in Llangefni on the same island where she was born. She retired from teaching to pursue a career in writing.

== Works ==
- Nofelau Nawr: Cadwyn O Flodau, 2000
- White Tree, 2001
- A White Veil for Tomorrow, 2003
- Swigod: Jelygaid, 2012
- Rhannu Ymbarèl, 2017
