= Ysgol Gymraeg Aberystwyth =

Coordinates: 52.41°N 4.071°W

Location
- Plascrug Avenue; Aberystwyth; Wales

Information
- Type: Primary
- Established: 1939
- Specialist: Welsh-language
- Headteacher: Gareth James
- Gender: Co-educational
- Age: 3 to 11
- Website: ysgolgymraeg.ceredigion.sch.uk

Ysgol Gymraeg Aberystwyth is a Welsh language primary school in the university town of Aberystwyth in Ceredigion, Wales. It was established as a private school in 1939 by Sir Ifan ab Owen Edwards and was originally named Ysgol Gymraeg yr Urdd. The school was the first Welsh-medium school in Wales, the first headteacher being prominent dramatist Norah Isaac.

The school originally had seven pupils, but has grown significantly since then. As of 2024, 375 pupils are on roll at the school. The school expanded rapidly during the 1980s and 1990s as parents began to see the academic value in bilingual education. Although 95% of the students speak Welsh to a first language level, only 65% come from homes where Welsh is the main language spoken. Today, the school has 18 teachers, over 20 assistants and 15 auxiliary staff. A 2016 school inspection report by Estyn found it to be excellent in all categories, and stated "The quality of teaching and learning experiences is very high, and support to ensure pupils’ wellbeing is an exceptional feature."

The Welsh children's author Mary Vaughan Jones was a teacher at the school between 1953 and 1958. Aled Haydn Jones, a BBC radio producer on The Chris Moyles Show, was a pupil.
