= Rhiannon Ifans =

Welsh academic and author

- Born: 1954 (age 70–71)
- Education: University of Aberystwyth Welsh language and literature
- Employer: University of Wales Trinity St. David - retired
- Known for: Welsh and Celtic medieval literature
- Notable work: Chwedlau o'r gwledydd Celtaidd (1999); Dewi Sant (2001); Ingrid (2019)
- Awards: Tir na n-Og Award (2000, 2003); Literary Medal National Eisteddfod of Wales (2019)
- Honours: elected Fellow of the Learned Society of Wales 2020

Rhiannon Ifans, FLSW (born 1954) is a Welsh academic specialising in English, medieval and Welsh literature. She was an Anthony Dyson Fellow at the Centre for Advanced Welsh and Celtic Studies, in University of Wales Trinity St. David. She twice won a Tir na-n-Og prize for her work and won the literary medal competition at the Welsh Eisteddfod, for her 2019 debut novel, Ingrid, which was chosen for the Welsh Literature Exchange Bookshelf (for translation abroad at the 2019 Frankfurt Book Fair). In 2020, Ifans was elected as a Fellow of the Learned Society of Wales.

== Career ==
Ifans was a Dyson Fellow at the Centre for Advanced Welsh and Celtic Studies in University of Wales Trinity St. David. She is general secretary of the Welsh Folk Song Society and editor of the annual journal Canu Gwerin / Folk Song. Ifans has published formal monographs and popular versions for adults and young people (including collaborations for illustration) sharing her knowledge of the Welsh and Celtic literature.

== Selected works in Welsh and English ==
Her collection of Welsh poetry through the ages for St. Valentine's Day (Sant Ffolant in Wales) was published in 2019, Red hearts and roses? and she was invited to give the Cliff Tucker memorial lecture.

A collaboration on Y Mabinogion, a collection of classical medieval Welsh tales was published in 1980. In 1989 she collaborated on an English young person's book, re-telling the ancient fables, The Magic of the Mabinogion, and another called Tales from Wales. Books in a similar illustrated style followed on the Tales of King Arthur on the lives of the patron saint of Wales, St. David (Dewi Sant in Welsh) and in English which won a Tir-an-Og Award and she also wrote about the Apostle Paul, and a 'simple guide to the Christian Gospel'.

Ifans also wrote a version of the tales of the first Prince of Wales, Owen Glendower (Owain Glendwr), and in Welsh, a selection of heroic and other traditional tales from Celtic countries, published 1999, Chwedlau o'r gwledydd Celtaidd which won the Welsh Tir na-n-Og prize (2000); this was translated into English in 2014. Her monograph, an analysis of the writing of Thomas Edwards (Twm o'r Nant) was published in 1998. In 2008, she used Welsh ballads to tell the stories of the gold hunters in rural Australia (Welsh monograph), and another on the poetic debates between Sir Dafydd Trefor and four other poets in the 15th and early 16th century in 2013, and a monograph on Grufydd Llwydd, a poet of love and religious verse (2000).

In 2019, her first fiction work, ebook Ingrid, described as 'a sensitive and unforgettable portrayal of dementia' was nominated for the Welsh Literature Exchange Bookshelf (for translation abroad at the 2019 Frankfurt Book Fair) and had won the Literary Medal Competition at the Conwy County National Eisteddfod of Wales; the writing was called 'crafty, brilliant, original' by the judges, who also commented that '"Few Welsh novels bring the culture of another country to life, but here the Welsh language gives its voice entirely to the German world."

A new book on the rituals and poetry of the winter season is due early in 2022.

== Awards ==
In 1999, Chwedlau o'r gwledydd Celtaidd won the Welsh Tir na-n-Og prize (2000) and her book on St David won in 2003, and on Owain Glendwr was a finalist shortlisted in 2001.

In 2019, her ebook Ingrid won a prize in the Literary Medal Competition at the Conwy County National Eisteddfod of Wales. Ifans was elected to the Learned Society of Wales in 2020.

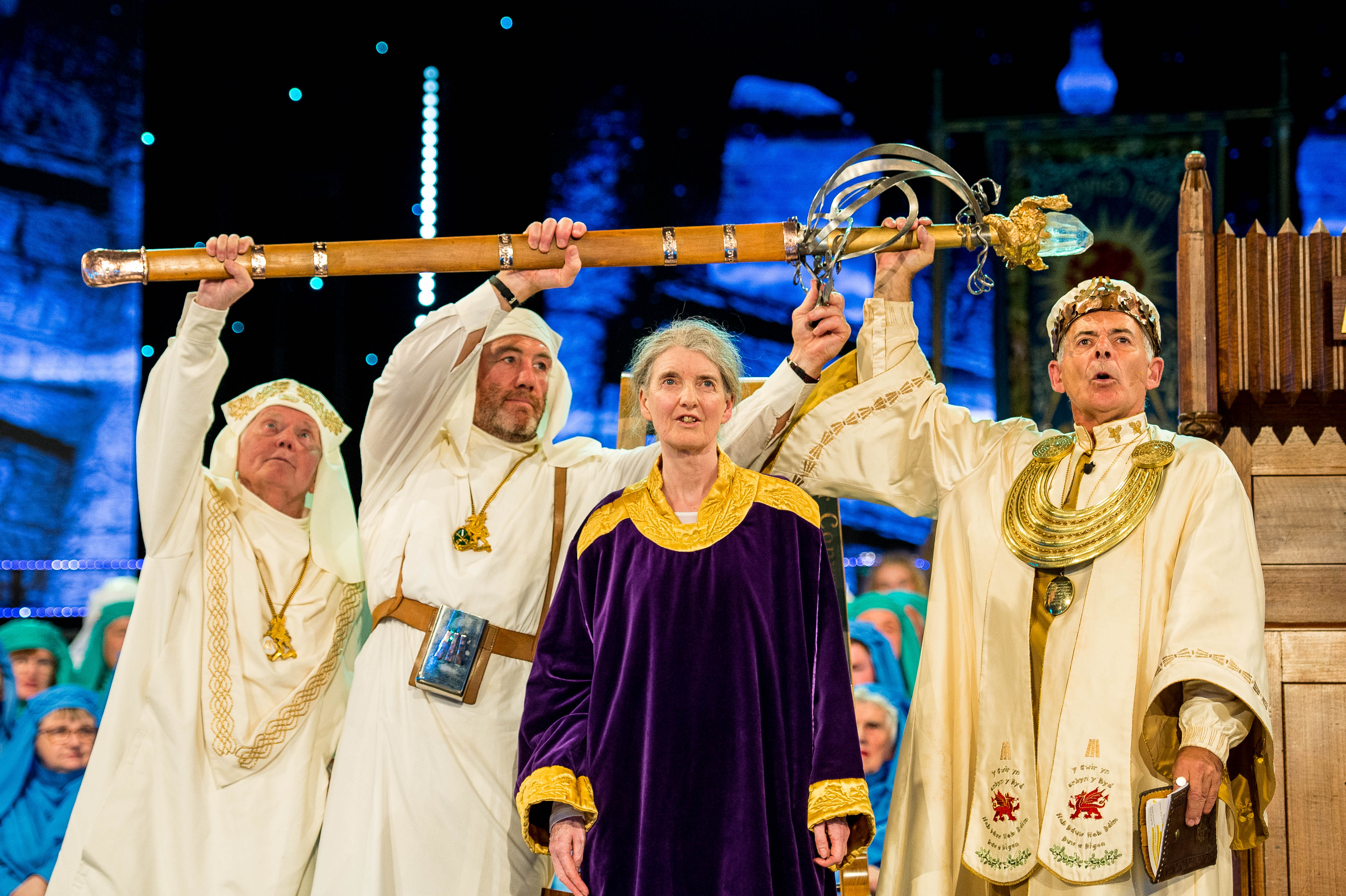
Rhiannon Ifans wins award at National Eisteddfod

== Personal life ==
Rhiannon Ifans was born in 1954, and spent her childhood at Carreg Wian farm in Llanidan, Anglesey, and was educated at Gaerwen Primary School and Ysgol Gyfun Llangefni. She studied Welsh language and literature at the University of Aberystwyth. She married Dafydd Ifans and has collaborated with him in some of her work. They have three sons. She is retired and lives in Penrhyn-coch and now has grandchildren in Cardiff.
