= Jac Jones =

Welsh children's book illustrator

- Born: 1 March 1943 (age 82); Gwalchmai, Anglesey, Wales
- Education: Ysgol Gynradd Gwalchmai, Ysgol Uwchradd Llangefni
- Occupation: children's book illustrator
- Years active: since mid-1970s
- Awards: Tir na n-Og Award (1989, 1990, 1998, 2020); Mary Vaughan Jones Award (2012)

Jac Jones (born 1 March 1943) is a Welsh children's book illustrator.

He was born in Gwalchmai, Anglesey, Wales, and raised in Bristol, England, until the age of 7, before returning to Gwalchmai. He was educated at Ysgol Gynradd Gwalchmai and Ysgol Uwchradd Llangefni.

Jones has illustrated children's books since the mid-1970s. He has won the Tir na n-Og Award for several books, including the 2009 Award for A Nod from Nelson by Simon Weston. In 2000, he wrote and illustrated a book in both Welsh and English – Betsan a’r Bwlis / Alison and the Bully Monsters. His illustration work includes Welsh works of note such as Penillion y Plant, Trysorfa by T. Llew Jones and many of Mary Vaughan Jones' titles and famous characters including Jac y Jwc.

Jones won the Mary Vaughan Jones Award in 2012.
