= Rownd a Rownd =

Welsh-language soap opera

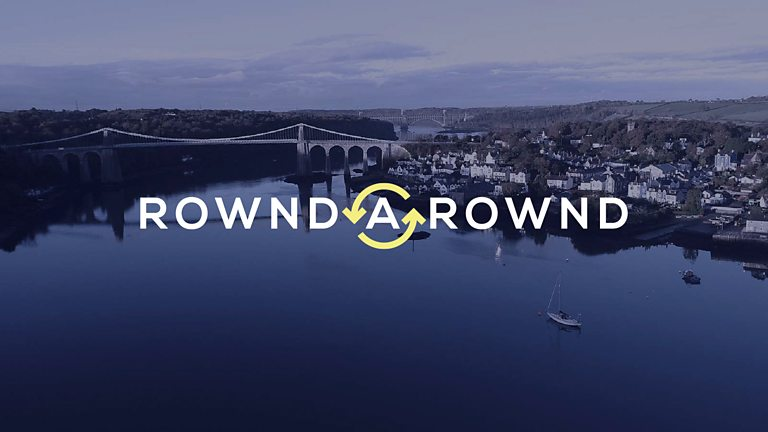
- Genre: Soap opera
- Theme music composer: Jochen Eisentraut
- Country of origin: United Kingdom (Wales)
- Original language: Welsh
- No. of series: 31
- No. of episodes: 2,144

Production
- Executive producer: Bedwyr Rees
- Producers: Annes Wyn; Lleucu Gruffydd
- Production locations: Menai Bridge; Bangor; Caernarfon; Llangefni
- Editors: Rhian Evans; Geraint Williams
- Running time: 30 minutes (inc. adverts)
- Production companies: Ffilmiau'r Nant (1995–2008); Rondo Media (2008–)

Original release
- Network: S4C
- Release: 11 September 1995 – present

Related
- Pobol y Cwm

Rownd a Rownd (Round and Round) is a Welsh-language soap opera created by Rondo Media (formerly Ffilmiau’r Nant) and shown on S4C since 11 September 1995. It was claimed to be the first Celtic-related language soap specifically directed at a youth audience. It is set in the fictional harbour town of Glanrafon on Anglesey.

At its inception, the soap was targeted towards an adolescent and young adult audience. It has since broadened its appeal but the main focus remains on the younger characters. Beginning with a small cast of characters, the serial now has upwards of thirty cast members.

The soap is consistently in the top 20 most watched programmes of the week on S4C, the show currently averaging around twenty thousand viewers per episode. Two episodes are produced each week; since February 2020 these have been broadcast at 20:25 on Tuesdays and Thursdays (with the previous episode being repeated at 18:30). In addition, a weekly omnibus with in-vision English language subtitles airs on Sunday daytime. Every summer Rownd a Rownd takes a two-month seasonal break, finishing in mid-July and restarting in September to coincide with the new academic year.

== Background ==
Rownd a Rownd was first broadcast in September 1995 and was originally based on young people who did a paper round (hence the programme's title, based on the wheels of a bicycle). It has since grown to include both their daily school life and their family life. Phil Redmond, creator of Grange Hill, Brookside and Hollyoaks, acted as a consultant to the series on its launch in 1995, and again on its tenth anniversary.

The longest-serving cast member was Iestyn Garlick, who portrayed Jim "Gym" Williams. The character, a physical education teacher who later became headmaster of the local secondary school, first appeared in September 1995 and remained a regular until July 2020, a period of nearly 25 years. Garlick briefly reprised the role in 2026 for a single episode. Following his departure as a regular cast member, Angharad Lloyd's character, Sophie Roberts, became the programme's longest-serving regular character, having first appeared in 1997. Sophie's parents, Glenda Phillips (Elliw Haf) and Terry Phillips (John Glyn Owen), who also debuted in 1997, continue to appear on a recurring basis.

== Production ==
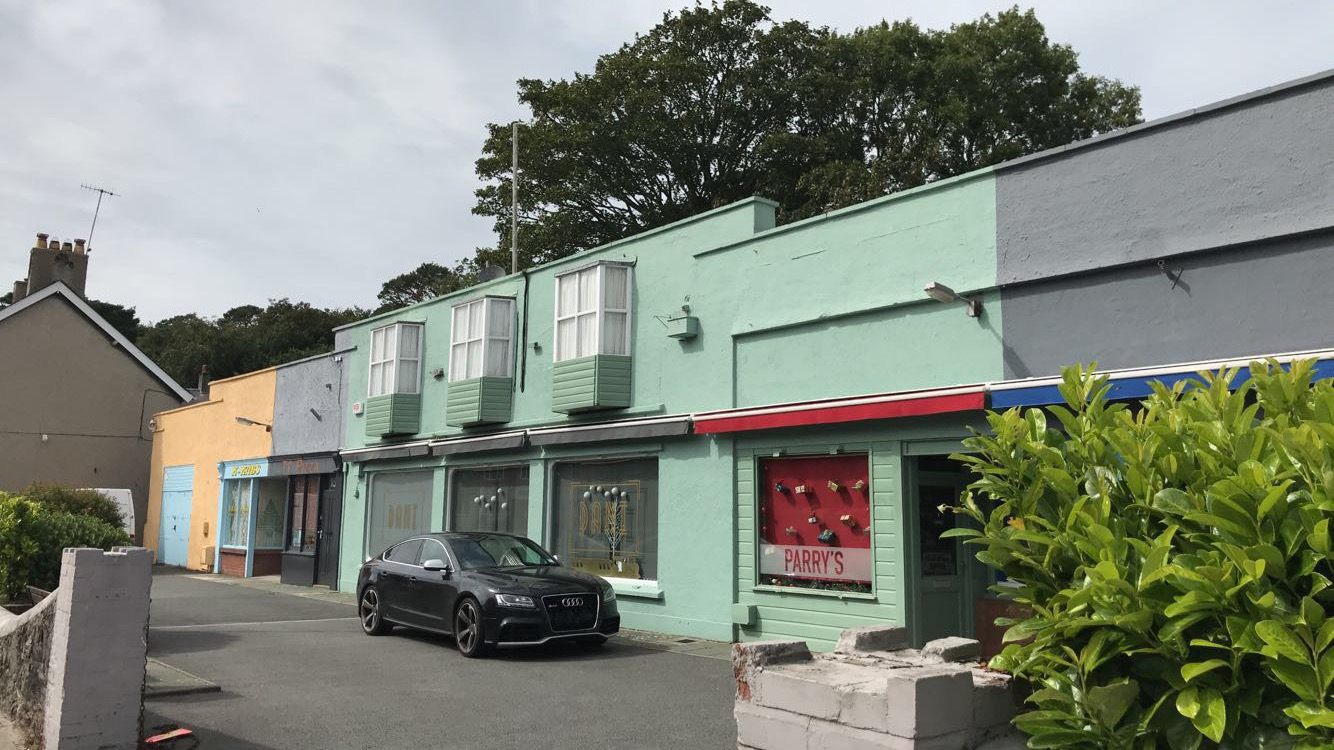
Rownd a Rownd set in 2019

The series is filmed in Menai Bridge, Llangefni, and Caernarfon, North Wales, and is produced by Rondo Media (previously known as Ffilmiau Nant). When it began, the production company converted a disused garage in Dale Street (Welsh name: "Lôn Cilbedlam") in Menai Bridge into a fake row of shops, which includes a café, a hairdresser, a newsagent, a taxi firm, a pizza place and a bar. There is a sign outside this set informing the public that the shops are not real. School scenes are filmed in Ysgol Gyfun Llangefni and Ysgol David Hughes. Hospital scenes are often filmed in nearby Ysbyty Gwynedd, Bangor, usually in one of the staff hostels. The soap also regularly makes use of incidental music; in keeping with the show's style, this usually consists of indie-pop or synth-pop music sung in Welsh.

On 18 March 2020 it was announced that filming for Rownd a Rownd would be suspended in the light of the spread of COVID-19. Filming resumed in August 2020 with social distancing guidelines in place. Two additional filming sites were also added to Rownd a Rownd's set in Menai Bridge in order to keep people sufficiently apart; these are located in the nearby towns of Caernarfon and Llangefni.

== Cast ==
=== Regular characters ===
| Character | Current actor | Duration | Details |
|---|---|---|---|
| Sophie Roberts (née Phillips) | Angharad Llwyd | 1997– | Glenda's daughter. Biological daughter of Stephen King and stepdaughter of Terry. Gossipy, quarrelsome character, particularly disliked by Dani due to her previous relationship with Dani's father. Mother of Owain, Mair and Nansi and stepmother of Llew. Has been in numerous relationships including Martin, Elfyn, Gavin, Wyn, Mathew. Ex-wife to Eifion Davies (Owain's father) and Vince. Separated from Dylan after his one night stand. Used to run her own mobile hairdressing business, but lost her driving licence after being caught drink-driving following a collision with Arthur Thomas. Currently works as a waitress in Sgram, the local café. |
| Kenneth "Ken" Walsh | Idris Morris Jones | 1999– | Co-owner of local taxi firm K-Kabs with his wife Kay. Also works in Bythol Wyrdd, an upcyling shop. Father to Klaire, Kylie and the late Kelvin. A kindly man who often finds himself apologising on his wife's behalf. Has also served prison time in the past. |
| Kay Walsh (née Williams) | Buddug Povey | 1999– | Ken's acerbic, no-nonsense wife and co-owner of K-Kabs. Has been unfaithful in the past, but eventually always goes back to Ken. Previously had an affair with her college lecturer Gareth Harries and family friend Vince Barclay. Daughter of the late Ron. Sister to Meical and paternal half-sister to the late David. Mother to Klaire (who moved away to become a nurse), Kylie (currently studying at Cardiff University) and the late Kelvin. Has struggled most with Kelvin's death and become alcohol dependent |
| Dani Keegan–Williams | Ffion Medi Jones | 2002– | Owner of Copa, a bar, and manager of Dal i Dorri, a salon, she is the daughter of Michelle and the late Wyn Sr., who died on New Year's Eve in 2020. She has a brother, Jonathan, who lives in Australia, as well as a maternal half-sister, Britney, and paternal half-siblings, Gruff, Sioned, and Siwan. Of these, only Britney remains in her immediate life. She is also the maternal granddaughter of Madam Serena. In the past, has had relationships with Rhodri, Barry, David, and Iolo. She married Jac Thomas in October 2019, but they separated in January 2020 after she was unfaithful. Mother of Wyn Jr, whose father is Barry Hardy, and is currently in a relationship with and living with Barry’s brother, Jason Hardy. She fell pregnant by Jason but had a miscarriage in 2026, later telling him she wants no more children as a result |
| Britney Keegan–Williams | Non Hughes, Fflur Davies | 2005–2019, 2025– | Michelle and Meical's daughter. Maternal half-sister to Dani and Jonathan. Paternal granddaughter to the late Ron. Worked at Sgram, the local cafe, until she was sacked for stashing drugs for her boyfriend Steve on the premises. Currently works in Copa. Dated Ed Williams (brother of Caitlin) until he violently assaulted her when she tried to blackmail him, putting her into a coma and then trying to kill her in hospital to cover his tracks unsuccessfully before being arrested. Currently trying to launch a career as an influencer. Has a love-hate relationship with Dani |
| Jason Hardy | Iwan Fôn | 2005–2015, 2017– | Lived in Tŷ Pizza's flat, now lives with girlfriend Dani and her son and his nephew Wyn. Has a share in his brother Barry's pizza shop after winning £10,000 on a scratchcard in 2018, although he was often accused by his brother of not taking the business seriously. Used to be in a relationship with Angharad Thomas, Erin Richards and Anest Owen, who cheated on him with Mathew. Good friends with workmates Caitlin and Cai, and with Arthur who is a father figure to him, especially since the death of his wife, and Jason's mother, Iris in 2021 |
| Vincent "Vince" Barclay | Huw Llŷr | 2005– | Caretaker at the school. Former postman and taxi driver. Friend of the Ks. Father to Callum (with former partner Julie) and Mair (with ex-wife Sophie, with whom he had an adoptive son, Owain). Ex-boyfriend to Cathryn. Was previously in prison for burning his own warehouse down for insurance money. Lived with Mathew and Iolo. Now married to Gwenno, and lives with her and her son Iestyn |
| Mathew Parry | Robin Ceiriog | 2006– | Eldest son of Phillip. Deputy headteacher and formerly a physical education teacher at the local school. Ex-fiancé to Siân, which ended as a result of an affair with fellow teacher Llio James. Ex-boyfriend to Sophie and Mel. Previously struggled from a gambling and prescription drug addiction. Had an affair with Anest which ended acrimoniously and destroyed her relationship with Jason, resulting in her catfishing him in revenge. Father of Lea, a student at the school, through a one-night stand. In a relationship with headteacher Elen. |
| Philip Parry | Maldwyn John | 2007– | Owner of the salon, shop and café which he bought against Terry and Glenda. Father of three boys, Mathew, Sion and Dewi (the last two of whom now live in Spain with his ex-wife Alwena). Grandfather of Lea. His first marriage finished after his wife died of cancer. Husband to Lowri, to the initial surprise of the locals owing to their age difference. Nearly died of sepsis in February 2024 after falling on a knife in the café's dishwasher. Hid massive debt from Lowri, which threatened his marriage. Currently attempting to adopt Lowri's daughter Mia. |
| Siân Richards (née Hughes) | Mari Wyn Roberts | 2007– | Detective Inspector at the local police station, once full-tiime but now part-time. Also works at Bythol Wyrdd. Miscarried her first child in a car accident with Vince. Sister to Alwyn (the owner of the garage prior to her eventual husband John) and aunt to Nel (who died on New Year's Eve 2015) and Dafydd. Viciously stalked by former co-worker Mark Harris in 2020, and was held captive before escaping. Widow of John Richards, whom she married in July 2019 until his death in April 2023. Had an affair with Trystan's father Geraint, whose wife subsequently attempted to run over her with her car (striking Rhys instead). |
| Arthur Thomas | Gwyn Vaughan Jones | 2007– | A train-obsessed courier who is comical and scheming. Unknowingly had a daughter, Angharad, whom Terry and Glenda fostered before her parentage was revealed. Grandfather to Dewi, Angharad's son (to whom she had with Dyfan Llywelyn). Long-time partner to Iris, before her death in December 2021. Had an on-again/off-again relationship with Mel's mother, Gloria. Father-figure and friend to Jason. |
| Mair Barclay | Gwenno Llwyd Beech | 2009– | Previously innocuous daughter of Sophie and Vince. She has gone on to become troublesome due to exam pressure placed on her by Sophie. She took this out on former friend Anna in a bullying storyline in 2023, and pretended to be dating Cai in 2024. Now in a relationship with Ioan and has a daughter with him, Noa. |
| Lowri Parry (née Roberts) | Lowri Gwynne | 2010– | Hard-working hairdresser and mother to Robbie and Mia. Good friends of Dani and Gwenno (who is also her cousin) and often serves as an agony aunt to them. Married Kelvin in 2013 but separated in 2018. Their divorce was finalised in 2020. In a relationship with Philip, whom she married in 2023. |
| Iolo Davies | Tudur Lloyd Evans | 2013– | Philip's nephew and cousin to Mathew, Dewi and Sion. Worker at Yr Iard and former barman at Copa. Ex-boyfriend to Kim, Llio, Cathryn, Dani, and Anest. |
| Rhys Morgan-Richards | Meilir Rhys Williams | 2016– | Glanrafon's resident mechanic. Old friend of Barry. Son of John and Delyth Richards. Previously struggled from an exercise addiction when his boyfriend died in a car crash in September 2017. Husband to hair stylist Trystan Morgan, with whom he now lives in Tŷ Pizza's flat. |
| Dylan Roberts | Dafydd Rhys Evans | 2018– | ICT teacher from South Wales. Husband to Sophie, after a long on-and-off relationship. Well-liked by the locals, to the chagrin of fellow teacher Mathew, the pair becoming more friendly in later years. Father to teenager Llew (son of Fflur), and infant Nansi (daughter of Sophie). Widower of Fflur, who died after a short battle with breast cancer in July 2020, whom he married only a month prior to her death. Currently separated from Sophie following a one-night stand |
| Gwenno Barclay (previously Owen) | Elen Gwynne | 2018– | Former partner of Carwyn, used to help out in the shop. Initially a supply teacher at the school, she now works there permanently. Cousin to Lowri. Mother to Anest (now living in South Africa with Carwyn) and Iestyn, with whom she co-owned Yr Iard (which she sold fully to Anest and Iestyn in 2024). Now married to Vince. |
| Iestyn Owen | Josh Morgan | 2018– | Rebellious member of the Owen family. Suspended from his old school for selling drugs, which meant they had to move to the village. Previously a Bangor University student, but left after his first year. Found out that he is biologically not Carwyn's son. His real father Glenn Jones was discovered to have died prior to his knowledge. Lost his girlfriend Tammy in a 'tragic accident' but it was actually a murder. Dated Elliw until she found out he had put a tracker on her mobile phone and dumped him. Relations between them have since thawed and she works with him at Yr Iard |
| Elen Edwards | Catrin Mara | 2019– | Headteacher of Glanrafon, the local school. Tough upbringing, with both parents drug addicts. Mother of two daughters, Mali (who now lives abroad) and Anna. Strict but kindly. Separated from Llŷr, but has taken in his son Ioan. Partner of deputy headteacher Mathew. |
| Melanie "Mel" Roberts | Elain Lloyd | 2020– | Daughter of Gloria. Initially introduced as Mathew's one night stand, later girlfriend. Dated Kelvin from 2020 until his death in 2025. Works at the café. Mother to Kynan. |
| Caitlin Collins | Manw Robin | 2021– | A homeless girl found by Siân living rough in a tent in the woods after stealing from Philip's shop. Fostered by Siân and the late John. Currently in a relationship with Cai. Works as a mechanic at Rhys's garage. |
| Cai Harris | Noel Davies | 2022– | Formerly a student at Bangor University and has now graduated. Worked occasionally at Tŷ Pizza and Parry's shop, and now works at Copa. Currently dating Caitlin. |
| Ioan Hopkins | Macsen Stevens | 2022– | The teenage son of Emma and Llyr. Emma moved to Aberystwyth, unable to raise him, while Llyr is in prison for a hit-and-run that killed their neighbour, John Richards—an accident that was originally caused and covered up by his brother, Efan. He now lives with Elen (who had dated Llyr before his imprisonment) and her daughter, Anna. A modest and mature young man, he is in a relationship with Mair whom he has a daughter with, Noa |
| Trystan Morgan-Richards | Gethin Bickerton | 2023– | Hair stylist at Dal i Dorri. Loves travel and organizing parties. Was a victim of revenge porn committed by former boyfriend Sebastian. Husband to Rhys with whom he lives in Tŷ Pizza's flat. Son of Geraint. |
| Lea Jones | Mali Grigg | 2024– | Formerly a pupil at the local school. Originally from Cardiff, but moved to live with her aunt in North Wales after the death of her mother. Revealed to be Mathew Parry's daughter through a one night stand. Now lives with Mathew and his cousin Iolo. Works in the cafe with her grandfather, the owner Philip. |

=== Recurring and guest characters ===
| Character | Actor | Duration | Details |
|---|---|---|---|
| Glenda Prichard Phillips (née Owen) | Elliw Haf | 1997– | Local gossip. She is married to Terry and is the mother of four daughters; twin girls Manon and Menna, Lucy (who is living in Australia) and Sophie. Former school nurse. Worked at Sgram, the local café for almost twenty years, before leaving to set up her own cake business, 'Becws Cacennau Glenda'. As a result, some locals refer to her as 'Glenda BCG'. Once a regular, she is now a recurring character. |
| Terry Phillips | John Glyn Owen | 1997– | Owner of a construction company. Formerly boss to Kelvin, whose death he accidentally caused by reversing his van into a ladder Kelvin was on. Glenda's husband, adoptive father of Lucy and Sophie and biological father to Manon and Menna. Has fostered children over the years with his wife. Once a regular, he is now a recurring character. |
| Edwin Lloyd | Phylip Hughes | 1998– | Resident of Glanrafon for many years. Respectable chapel organist. Known as 'Mr. Lloyd' and rarely called by his first name. Widower of Lena, who died in 2014. Retired driving instructor. Once a regular, he is now a recurring character. |
| Mia Walsh | Erin Fflur Owen | 2015– | Daughter of Lowri and the late Kelvin. Currently awaiting adoption by Philip. A mature and down-to-earth young woman |
| Anna Edwards | Gwenlli Dafydd | 2019– | Second daughter of Elen. Maternal half-sister to Mali. Her father died in 2019. Normally a happy-go-lucky, straight-A student, both her schooling and self-esteem suffered when former friend Mair bullied her in 2023. She also became a victim of online sexploitation in 2025. Close friends with Ioan. |
| Llew Roberts | Gwion Llwyd | 2019– | Son of Dylan and the late Fflur, as a result of an affair - Fflur was married to another man at the time. His mother died in July 2020 after learning her cancer was terminal. |
| Nansi Roberts | Cadi Fôn Booth | 2022– | Daughter of Sophie and Dylan. |
| Elliott | Owain Pritchard | 2022– | Ioan's best friend, and friends with Mair, Anna and Beca. A cheeky chappy who often has comical interactions with Arthur |
| Beca | Chenai Chikanza | 2023– | School friend of Anna and Mair. First appeared in the spin-off series Copsan in 2022. |
| Wyn Hardy | Lennie Taylor | 2023– | Son of Dani and Barry. |
| Lili Richards | Madison McGinn | 2023– | Daughter of Erin. Granddaughter to John. Being cared for by John's widow Sian after Erin gave her up in 2025 and returned to Spain |
| Kynan Walsh | Owi Tomos Edwards | 2025– | Son of Mel and the late Kelvin. Grandson to Ken and Kay. |
| Noa Hopkins | Daisy Mae Wisbey | 2026– | Newborn daughter of Mair and Ioan. |

== Buildings ==
| Building | Information |
|---|---|
| Bridge | Kebab house |
| Copa | Bar (originally Bob Beics, a bike shop, then Q's, a youth centre) |
| Dal i Dorri | Salon (formerly called Crib Goch, Nikki's and Dani) |
| Ho Wah | Chinese take-away |
| Bythol Wyrdd | Upcycling shop. Formerly BJ Cabs and Kay Kabs; originally Bryn Jones, a funeral director's |
| Llys Menai | Retirement home |
| Menai Bridge | Suspension bridge |
| Menai Bridge Post Office | Post office |
| Parry's | General store (formerly called Mortons) |
| Penrallt | Church |
| Richards' | Garage (formerly Alwyn Hughes a'i Ferch) |
| Sgram | Café |
| Tŷ Pizza | Pizzeria. Originally Print Man, a print shop, then Fanna, a jewellery and crockery shop |
| Ysgol Glanrafon | Comprehensive secondary school |
| Ysgol Gymraeg Glanrafon | Primary school (unseen) |
| Yr Iard | Shop for nautical supplies and kayaks for rent |

== Copsan ==
Rownd a Rownd
- Genre: Soap opera
- Written by: Greta Sion
- Country of origin: Wales
- Original language: Welsh
- No. of series: 2
- No. of episodes: 9

Production
- Executive producer: Bedwyr Rees
- Producer: Will Clowes
- Production locations: Menai Bridge; Bangor; Caernarfon; Llangefni
- Editor: Geraint Williams
- Running time: 9–18 minutes
- Production company: Rondo Media

Original release
- Network: S4C
- Release: 9 February 2022 – 1 May 2023

In 2022, a spin-off series called Copsan was uploaded to Clic and BBC iPlayer. This was a three-part series chronicling an eventful and comical detention session at Glanrafon high school. It featured several regular characters such as Vince, Dylan and Cai, as well as some new characters not seen in the regular show.

A second series was broadcast in 2023. This was a six-part series about a group of 16-year-old Glanrafon students on an adventure weekend school trip, though none of the characters appear in Rownd a Rownd. Dylan is the only regular character to appear, doing so briefly in the first episode.

=== Episodes ===
| Series | Episodes | Originally released |
|---|---|---|
| Series 1 | 3 | 9 February 2022 |
| Series 2 | 6 | 1 May 2023 |

== See also ==
- List of Welsh television series
