= St Mary's College, Bangor =

Former teacher training college in Bangor, Wales

Coordinates: 53.2298°N 4.1313°W

St Mary's College
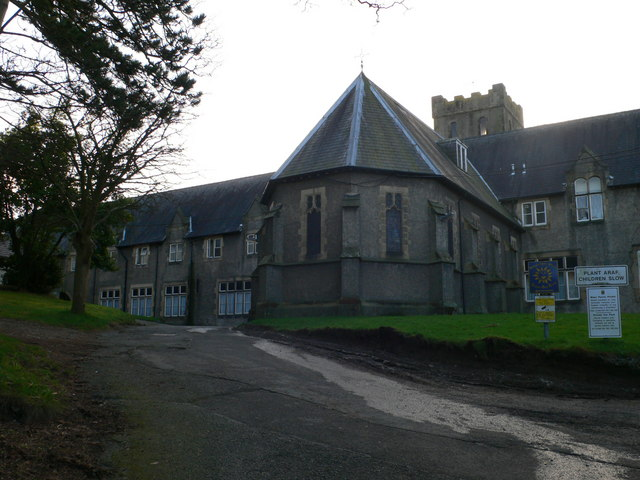
- Type: Teacher training college
- Active: 1893–1977
- Location: Bangor, Gwynedd, Wales

St Mary's College was a Church in Wales teacher training college in Bangor, founded in 1893 as the second normal school in the city.

In 1977 it became part of the University College of North Wales (UCNW), now Bangor University. Its campus closed for use in 2008, and was redeveloped into accommodation.

== History ==
It was an all-female college for most of its history, unlike Bangor Normal College. It was a member of a joint Faculty of Education between UCNW, Normal College, itself, and Cartrefle College in Wrexham to encourage collaboration.

Amalgamation with UCNW first began being discussed in July 1974, with the church governors of St Mary's being broadly supportive. In June 1976 the College Council approved the merger from September 1977.

== Developments ==
In 2015, Bangor University redeveloped the former campus into a student village, also known as St Mary's.

The Asda supermarket in Bangor is built on the former football fields of the college.

== See also ==
- Bangor Normal College
