= Pont Books =

British publishing company

Pont Books ("pont" being the Welsh word for bridge) is the name of the imprint for young people published by Gomer Press, the largest independent publishing house in Wales. Pont Books was launched in 1991. The logo shows its intention of building bridges between young people in Wales, whatever their background and whichever languages they speak. Pont publications are all in English but there is always a strong Welsh connection.

Seven years running to 2012, books published by Pont have won the Tir na n-Og Award by the Welsh Books Council, in the English-language category which recognises the year's best book with "authentic Welsh background". That streak begins and ends (so far) with Jennifer Sullivan.
