= Margaret Jones (artist) =

Welsh illustrator (1918–2024)

Margaret "Peggy" Jones (1918–2024) was a Welsh illustrator. She is best known for her detailed illustrations and maps depicting the folklore of Wales, among them the Mabinogi.

== Early and middle life ==
Margaret Jones was born in 1918 in Bromley, Kent. Her parents were the Methodist minister Christopher North, and his wife, Dorothy (née Atkinson). Following the death of her mother when Margaret was eight years old, she was sent to Trinity Hall, a boarding school in Southport, Lancashire. After gaining a degree in classics from the University of Birmingham, she entered training as a missionary at Kingsmead College in Selly Oak. During this time, Margaret met her future husband, Basil Jones, a Welsh Presbyterian minister. They married in 1941 and served as missionaries in Mizoram, India, until their return to Aberystwyth, Wales, in 1953. Basil became a lecturer at University College, Aberystwyth, and Margaret principally concentrated on raising their six children and organising the household. Outside home, she would occasionally perform puppet shows and shadow theatres in school halls.

== Artistic career ==
Margaret never received any formal artistic training, but had drawn privately since her childhood. It was only in her sixties that she began showing her work in public. In 1979, she asked Aberystwyth Arts Centre whether they would exhibit some of her works. This first show proved a great success, as the Arts Council of Wales approached Margaret and inquired whether she would fill a commission forTales from the Mabinogion (1984), an illustrated children's book telling the stories of the Four Branches of the Mabinogi co-authored by Gwyn Thomas and Kevin Crossley-Holland. This work also laid the foundations for future collaborations between Margaret and Gwyn.

Following this first commission, she created posters, calendars and illustrated maps, and she provided illustrations for several books. Among them were Robin Gwyndaf's Welsh Folk Tales / Chwedlau Gwerin Cymru (1989), Rhiannon Ifans's collection of Tales from Celtic Countries (1999), and Gwyn Thomas's children's books Madog (2005) and Llywelyn ein Llyw Olaf (2009). Her experience in illustrating folk stories from the Celtic countries led her to a collaboration with Wolfgang Greller on From the Four Corners of Europe: Tales and Folk Legends (2000).

She also wrote and illustrated two children's books of her own, Nat (2004) and Nat and the Box of Gifts (2006). Both books were inspired by Welsh folklore and legends.

== Recognition ==
Despite her late start as a professional artist, Jones' distinctive, intricate style and her visual story-telling in watercolour gained her recognition as one of Wales's notable illustrators of folk stories and legends of the 20th century.

In 2019, story-teller and illustrator Peter Stevenson and the National Library of Wales organised a retrospective of her work as a celebration of her centenary. Shortly before her death, the University of South Wales nominated her for the Astrid Lindgren Award for Children's Literature, one of the most prestigious children's book awards worldwide.

== Death ==
Basil died in 2002, and Peter, their son, died in 2022. At the time of her death in 2024, she was survived by her other five children: Elaine, Malcolm, Christopher, Mark and Gareth. Her granddaughter, Seren Morgan Jones, is a contemporary artist specialising in portraiture whose work has won great acclaim and has also been added to the collection of the National Library of Wales.
