= Gomer Press =

Printing company based in west Wales

- Status: Active
- Founded: 1892; 133 years ago
- Founder: JD Lewis
- Country of origin: Wales
- Headquarters location: Llandysul
- Publication types: Books
- Official website: gomer.co.uk

Gomer Press (Welsh: Gwasg Gomer) is a family printing (and formerly publishing) company based in Llandysul, west Wales. It was the largest publishing house in Wales.

== History ==
The company was first established in 1892 and began as a general store and printer; it is owned by the same family to this day. Jonathan Lewis, the great grandson of the company's founder, became managing director in 1995.

In September 2019, it was announced that Gomer would be closing their publishing arm to focus on printing. Its 55 employees were retained but would no longer publish new titles, of which it produced 36 in 2018. This marked the end of 66 years of publishing.

== Publications ==
Specialising in books which have a distinctive Welsh identity, Gomer had four distinct lists:

=== English books for adults ===
The English list for adults features fiction, history, travel writing, biography, literature, cookery, sport, and visual arts. Authors and artists include Gillian Clarke, Jim Perrin, Kyffin Williams, Eddie Butler, Jeremy Moore, and Idris Davies.

=== English books for children ===
Pont Books is an imprint designed to produce English books with a Welsh connection for children. It has published the last seven books to win the Tir na n-Og Award from the Welsh Books Council in the English-language category that honours the year's best book with "authentic Welsh background". Award winners include Graham Howells (2009), Daniel Morden (2007 and 2013), and Jennifer Sullivan (2006 and 2012).

=== Welsh books for children ===
Books for children of all ages in the Welsh language published by Gomer range from Smot's board books to teenage fiction. There are a number of different series, including Chwedlau o Gymru (Legends from Wales series), Cyfres Llyffantod (Hoppers series), and Cyfres Clwb Cysgu Cŵl (Sleepover Club series), Sali Mali, Tudur Budr (Dirty Bertie), Helpwch Eich Plentyn (Help Your Child), Cyfres Lolipop (Lollypop series), as well as a wide range of titles by prolific author and poet T. Llew Jones.

From 2000 to 2012, at least six Gwasg Gomer publications have won one of the two annual Welsh-language Tir na n-Og Awards.

=== Welsh books for adults ===
Gomer published the work of a number of the Welsh language's eminent literary figures, past and present, such as Islwyn Ffowc Elis, T. Rowland Hughes, Gwenallt, Hywel Teifi Edwards, Angharad Price, Fflur Dafydd, and Owen Martell. There were also two bilingual series: Trosiadau/Translations and Cip ar Gymru/Wonder Wales.
