= Jennifer Sullivan (writer) =

Welsh children's writer and critic

Jennifer Sullivan (born 1945) is a Welsh writer for children and adults, and a former literary critic. She is best known for her Magic Apostrophe series of children's fantasy books. She is a recipient of the Tir na n-Og Award.

== Biography ==
Sullivan was born in Cardiff, Wales, to Londoner Frederick Anderson (1900–1993), an electrician, and Phyllis (1905–2009), a short story writer.

Sullivan worked as a book critic for some years while her children were growing up. She has always written fiction, and during early professional years wrote mainly adult short stories. She has written a number of popular books, mostly suitable for 7–12 year olds, with Welsh themes incorporated into their story lines. She frequently visits primary schools in Wales to open events and carry out book signings.

Having lived in Raglan, Monmouthshire most of her life, Sullivan now resides in Brittany, France. She is married with three adult daughters, Kirsty, Tanith and Stephanie. Tanith is the name of a character from the Gwydion Trilogy.

In 1993, Sullivan was awarded the Irma Chilton Bursary, which is presented to aspiring children's novelists by the Welsh Arts Council.

Tiron's Secret Journal won the 2006 Tir na n-Og Award for the best English-language book of the year with a Welsh background. Sullivan won the award for the second time in 2012 with Full Moon.

== Works ==
Magic Apostrophe series

1. The Magic Apostrophe
2. The Island of Summer
3. Dragonson
4. Who, Me?
5. Me and My Big Mouth
6. Dragons – and Decisions
7. Nobody Asked Me!
8. What Part of 'No' Don't You Understand?
9. Tree of Light
10. The Jellyfish, the Dragon and the Witch (stand alone book)

Gwydion series

Set prior to The Magic Apostrophe, before Gwydion meets Tan'ith

1. Gwydion and the Flying Wand
2. Magic Maldwyn
3. Betsan the Brave
4. Gwydion's Quest

Back End of Nowhere series

1. The Back End of Nowhere
2. Nowhere Again

Llancaiach fawr books

1. Tirion's Secret Journal
2. Troublesome Thomas

Underground railway books

1. Full Moon
2. Totally Batty

The Aled books

1. The Great Cake Bake
2. The Great Granny Hunt

Silver Fox series

Adult series set during Owain Glyndŵr's War of Independence

1. Silver Fox - It Begins
2. Silver Fox - The Paths Diverge
3. A third book is planned

Non-series books

- Following Blue Water
- Macsen and the Pirates
- A Guardian What?
- Celtic Heroines
- C'mon, Cymru! (poetry)

Picture books

- Siôn and the Bargain Bee
- Two Left Feet (in Welsh and English)
- The Caterpillar That Couldn't (in Welsh and English)
- A Little Bit of Mischief (in Welsh and English)
