= Gwasg Carreg Gwalch =

Welsh publishing company

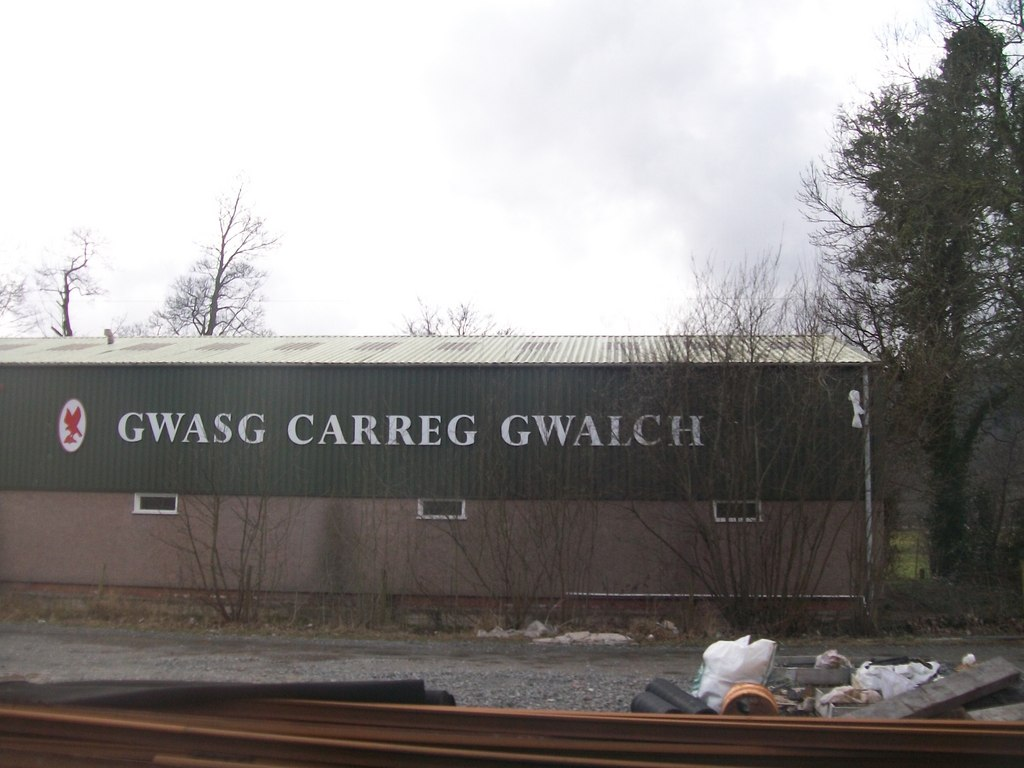
- Company type: Publishing company
- Founded: 1980, Capel Garmon, Wales
- Founder: Myrddin ap Dafydd
- Headquarters: Llanrwst, Wales
- Products: Publishing works

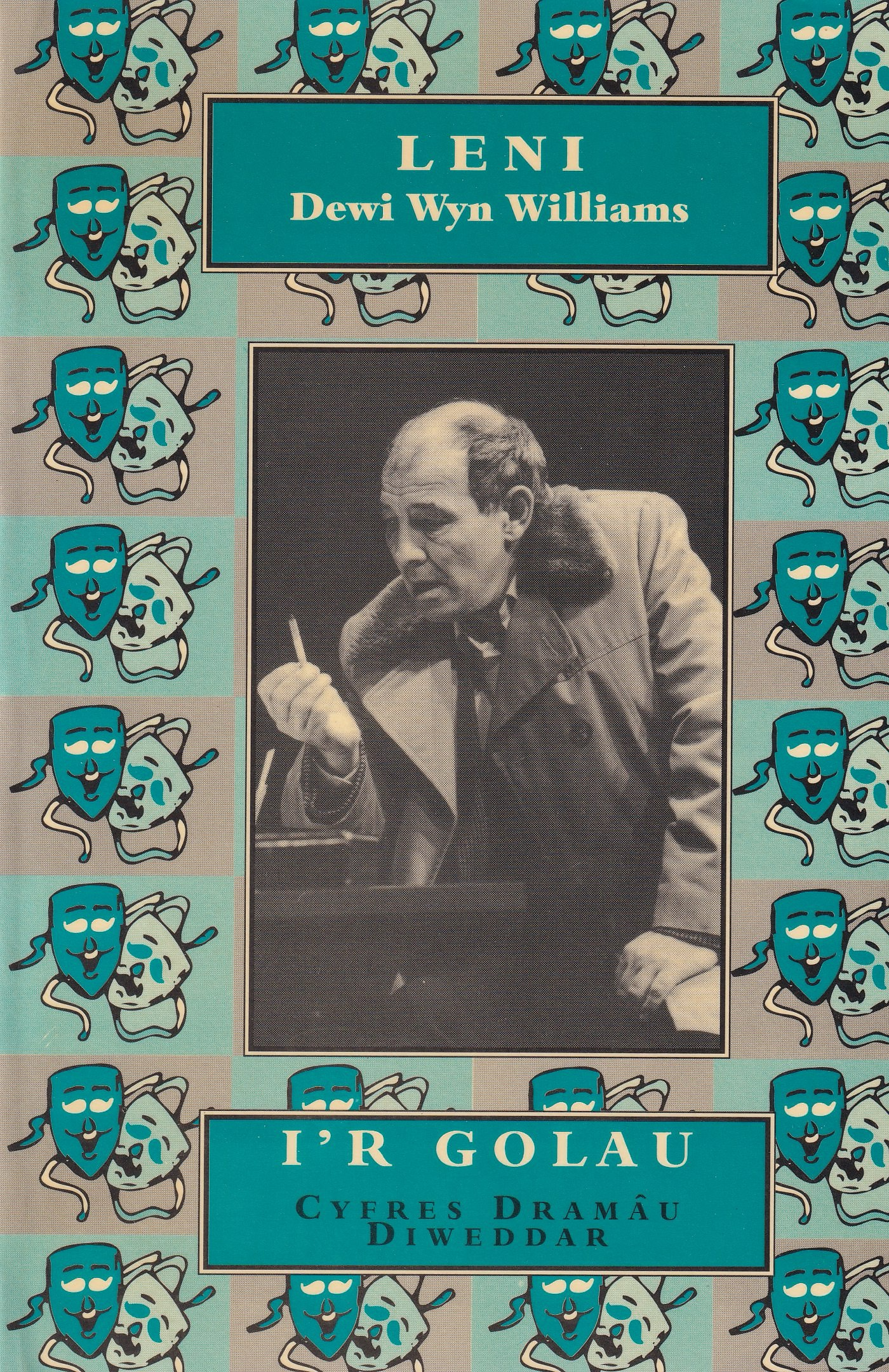

Gwasg Carreg Gwalch (Welsh pronunciation: [ˈɡwask ˈkarɛɡ ˈɡwalχ]) is a publishing company based in Llanrwst, Wales. They specialise in publishing works in the Welsh language, but also publish English-language books of Welsh interest.

The company was founded by Myrddin ap Dafydd in 1980, and was originally based in Capel Garmon. It takes its name from Carreg-y-gwalch ("falcon rock"), a local landmark which also gives it its logo.

Gwasg Carreg Gwalch has published works by writers such as Mererid Hopwood, Meic Stephens, Mike Jenkins and T. Llew Jones.
