= Gorsgoch =

Village in Ceredigion, Wales

Coordinates: 52.133008°N 4.217365°W

- Location within Ceredigion
- OS grid reference: SN483506
  - Cardiff: 90 mi (140 km)SE
- Community: Llanwenog
- Principal area: Ceredigion
- Preserved county: Dyfed
- Country: Wales
- Sovereign state: United Kingdom
- Post town: LLANYBYDDER
- Postcode district: SA40
- Dialling code: 01570
- Police: Dyfed-Powys
- Fire: Mid and West Wales
- Ambulance: Welsh
- UK Parliament: Ceredigion Preseli
- Senedd Cymru – Welsh Parliament: Ceredigion Penfro

Gorsgoch (Welsh pronunciation) is a small rural village located on the B4338 road near Lampeter in the county of Ceredigion, Wales. The town of Lampeter is 7 miles away and the town of New Quay is 15 miles away

"Cors" (mutated to Gors) is Welsh for "marsh" or "bog", and "goch" is the mutated form of "coch" meaning "red": so the name literally translated means "Red Bog". This upland bog is located alongside the main road that leads through the village.

The village is developing at a fast rate. New houses are being constructed and there are planning applications for more. Gorsgoch has a pub, Cefn-Hafod. The garages have been closed along with the school years ago. There is also a village hall that has been closed a few years; however, it is being refurbished.

The village is served by the 617 bus, from Lampeter to Rhydowen, via Llanybydder, Gorsgoch, and Talgarreg which runs once every Tuesday.
