= A475 road =

Road in Wales

Coordinates: 52.08776°N 4.26244°W

A475

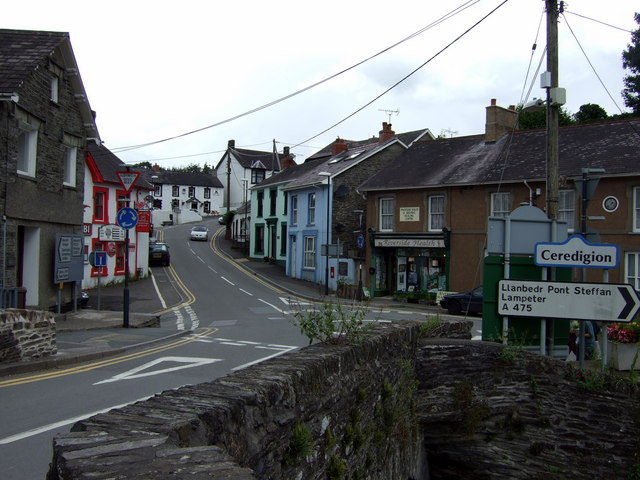

Route information
- Length: 19 mi (31 km)

Major junctions
- Northeast end: Lampeter
- A482 A485 A486 A484
- Southwest end: Newcastle Emlyn

Location
- Country: United Kingdom
- Constituent country: Wales

Road network
- Roads in the United Kingdom; Motorways; A and B road zones

The A475 road in Wales links Newcastle Emlyn in Carmarthenshire with Lampeter in Ceredigion; a distance of 19 miles (31 km).

== History ==
The road, that is now known as the A475, was set up in 1770 as a turnpike by the Cardiganshire Turnpike Trust. Many milestones can still be seen between the position of the turnpike gates at Lampeter and at Adpar. Both were wrecked during the Rebecca Riots. In 1923, "A475" was designated to the road from Swansea to Carmarthen. In 1935, this road was renumbered and the designation was given to the Lampeter–Newcastle Emlyn route.

On 11 September 2001, a council lorry collided with a school bus near the Horeb crossroads. A number of children and three adults were treated for shock and minor injury, but no one was seriously injured. In the same year a young couple died when their car left the road near Lampeter. A review of speed limits was called for in 2013 following an accident on the road, which was referred to by a local driver as "a death trap".

The A475 was classed by the Road Safety Foundation in 2011 as a low-medium risk road. In 2014, its classification was increased to be of medium risk.

== Route ==
The A475 leaves Lampeter southwestwards from a junction with the A482 and passes through the hamlet of Pentre-Bach and the village of Llanwnnen, where it is crossed by the B4337 Llanrhystud–Edwinsford road. This section of the road has a number of ascents and descents as it crosses the valleys formed by the tributaries of the River Teifi. It passes through the villages of Drefach and Cwmsychbant, then is crossed by the B4459 Talgarreg–Pencader road. The road continues to Pren-Gwyn and a junction with the B4476 road to Llandysul.

At Horeb the A475 is crossed by the A486 New Quay–Saron road. The road passes through Penrhiwllan, Aber-banc and Llandyfriog, and in Adpar reaches a roundabout junction with the B4571 and B4333 roads. After crossing the River Teifi into Newcastle Emlyn, the road ends at a junction with the A484 in Water Street.
