= A486 road =

Road in Wales

A486

Route information
- Length: 18 mi (29 km)

Major junctions
- North end: New Quay; 52.2154°N 4.3592°W
- A484 A475 A487
- South end: Saron (Llangeler), Carmarthenshire; 52.0087°N 4.3628°W

Location
- Country: United Kingdom
- Constituent country: Wales

Road network
- Roads in the United Kingdom; Motorways; A and B road zones

The A486 is an A road in Wales linking New Quay, Ceredigion, with the A484 in Saron (Llangeler), Carmarthenshire. The road is 17.26 miles (27.77km) long and takes around 26 minutes to drive its length by car

== Route ==
The road begins in New Quay near the waterfront area and (north to south) passes through or by the settlements of:

- Maenygroes
- Cross Inn
- Synod Inn (junction with A487 and B4338)
- Capel Cynon
- Ffostrasol
- Croes-Lan
- Horeb (junction with A475)
- Llandysul (bypassed, junction with B4624)
- Dolgran
- Pentrecwrt

The A486 finishes at the junction with the A484 in Saron.
