= St Gwenog's Church =

Coordinates: 52°05′14″N 4°11′55″W

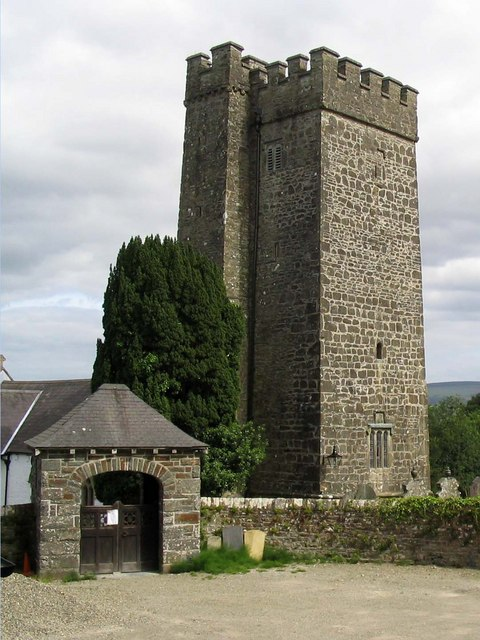
- St Gwenog's Church
- Location: Llanwenog, Llanybydder, Ceredigion
- Country: Wales
- Denomination: Anglican

History
- Founded: Medieval

Architecture
- Heritage designation: Grade I
- Designated: 6 March 1964
- Architectural type: Church

Administration
- Diocese: St Davids
- Archdeaconry: Cardigan
- Benefice: Lampeter

St Gwenog's Church is a Church in Wales church near Llanybydder, Ceredigion, Wales. It is a medieval building dating back to the late fourteenth century and is situated in the hamlet of Llanwenog on a minor road off the A475 near Drefach, Ceredigion. It is a Grade I-listed building.

This is a medieval church, and the only one dedicated to Saint Gwenog. It dates to the late fourteenth and fifteenth centuries, with the fine tower being added some time after 1485. It bears a plaque with the arms of Rhys ap Thomas, Lord of Dinefwr and Carew. The interior has the original fifteenth-century barrel roof. The pews and other church furnishings are elaborately carved. Some of the work was done by and to the design of Colonel Herbert Davies-Evans of Highmead at the beginning of the twentieth century, and others by the celebrated Belgian wood-carver, Joseph Reubens of Bruges during the period 1914 to 1919.

The church was granted Grade I-listed status on 6 March 1964, for being "the most complete medieval church in Cardiganshire, with fine late C15 roof and tower". Coflein's description states that "The nave and chancel may date from the fourteenth century. The chapel is thought to be fifteenth century."

The church is in the United Benefice of Lampeter and Archdeaconry of Cardigan in the Diocese of St Davids.

== St Gwenog ==
Little is known about Saint Gwenog. A 2015 guide to the church says that:

It is quite probable that Gwenog was first known by the name of Gwenllian or Gwen the Nun, and that it was she who established a preaching station, and erected a cross at Croesgwenllian – the farm-house which is situated only a short distance from the Church.

Sabine Baring-Gould describes her as "Virgin" and says that "The pedigree of Gwenog is nowhere given". Nicholas Harris Nicolas lists her saint's day as 3 January, and Smith and Wace state that she was from the 7th century.
