= Talgarreg =

Village in Ceredigion, Wales

Coordinates: 52.134114°N 4.300419°W

Talgarreg: Welsh: Talgarreg
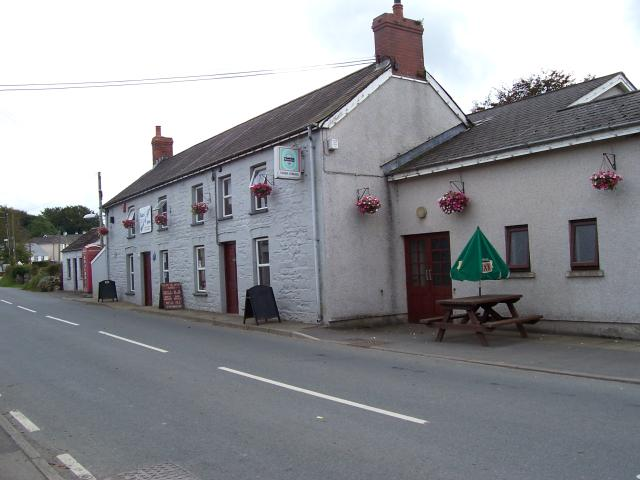

- Location within Ceredigion
- OS grid reference: SN426510
  - Cardiff: 90 mi (140 km)SE
- Principal area: Ceredigion
- Preserved county: Dyfed
- Country: Wales
- Sovereign state: United Kingdom
- Post town: LLANDYSUL
- Postcode district: SA44
- Dialling code: 01545
- Police: Dyfed-Powys
- Fire: Mid and West Wales
- Ambulance: Welsh
- UK Parliament: Ceredigion Preseli
- Senedd Cymru – Welsh Parliament: Ceredigion Penfro

Talgarreg is a small village in the community of Llandysiliogogo, in the county of Ceredigion, Wales. The village is located on a junction of the B4459, approximately halfway between New Quay and Llandysul.

Talgarreg lies in the ecclesiastical parish of Llanarth. The Clettwr River flows through the village on its way to join the River Teifi about 7 miles to the south.

Talgarreg is still a Welsh-speaking village, with the majority speaking the language.

Talgarreg is the home of a number of small businesses and farms, mainly sheep and dairy. It also has a pub, Glan-yr-Afon Arms, situated at the heart of the village.

The village is represented in the Senedd by Elin Jones (Plaid Cymru) and in the UK Parliament by Ben Lake (Plaid Cymru).

== Famous residents ==
- Rees Jones (Amnon) (1797–1844), poet. He was born and grew up in the upper part of the Clettwr Valley, near Talgarreg.
- Rees Cribin Jones (1841–1927), Unitarian minister and teacher, born at Talgarreg.
- Thomas Cynfelyn Benjamin (1850–1925), poet, minister, and winner of several eisteddfod honours. After many years in America, he returned to Wales, serving as minister of Capel Pisgah near Talgarreg between 1898 and 1905.
- Sarnicol (Thomas Jacob Thomas, 1873–1945), poet, writer and schoolmaster.
- Dewi Emrys (David Emrys James, 1881–1952), poet, and the only person to have won the National Eisteddfod Chair four times. He moved to live with his daughter Dwynwen, in Y Bwthyn, Talgarreg, in 1941. There he spent the rest of his life. He died in Aberystwyth in September 1952, and was buried in Capel Pisgah cemetery, near Talgarreg.
- T. Llew Jones (Thomas Llewelyn Jones, 1915–2009), poet and prolific writer, was a former teacher at Talgarreg Primary School.
- David Jacob Davies (1916–1974), minister, author and broadcaster. Buried at Bwlchyfadfa Cemetery, on the outskirts of Talgarreg.
- Eirwyn Pontshân (Gwilym Eirwyn Jones, 1922–1994), entertainer and nationalist, who was born in Talgarreg and lived in the village during his later years.
- Gillian Clarke (b. 1937), poet and resident of Talgarreg.
- Cynog Dafis (b. 1938), is a former resident and Plaid Cymru politician.
- Donald Evans (b. 1940), poet and native of Talgarreg. He is one of only three poets who have won both the Chair and the Crown at the same National Eisteddfod twice - "the double double".
- Meinir Mathias, artist.
- Mari Mathias, singer.

== Education ==
=== Ysgol Gymunedol Talgarreg (Primary School) ===
The current primary school was not the first school in the area, but this was the first school established under the Authority's responsibility. The construction work began in 1875 and the school opened in 1877 with up to 147 pupils that year.

Talgarreg school is a real community school in every sense of the word with the community and its rich culture leading and guiding the activity, this being maintained and promoted by the staff.

Naturally and in accordance with its heritage, Ysgol Talgarreg is a Welsh language school as well as being Welsh in its nature. As such, the school celebrates and promotes that at every possible opportunity.

In recent years between 30 and 70 children have been attending the school.

The primary school is twinned with Skol Diwan, Guingamp in Brittany.

=== Cylch Meithrin Talgarreg ===
Cylch Meithrin Talgarreg is a member of Mudiad Meithrin. The Cylch was opened in 1975 in the school and moved in the mid-nineties to the Neuadd Goffa (Memorial Hall). The Cylch closed its doors in 2003, but the Cylch Ti a Fi was re-opened in January 2007 and the Cylch Meithrin in September 2007 and it is still going from strength to strength.

The Cylch provides both care and education to small children aged two to four and the aim of the Cylch is to create a homely, happy and safe environment for children to flourish. They listen to the voice of the learner when providing educational activities that are of interest to everyone, through the medium of Welsh.

=== Sunday School ===
Sunday School is held at Pisgah chapel, near Talgarreg.

== Places of Worship ==
=== Pisgah Chapel ===
Capel Pisgah is an Independent chapel and was established in 1820–21. The chapel was rebuilt in 1871 on the foundations of the first Chapel, but was made larger to accommodate the increase in the size of the congregation. It is one of six chapels under the pastorate of Rev Carys Ann BA. They hold two services a month with the Minister, with the other Sundays being taken by guests.

=== Fadfa Chapel ===
Capel y Fadfa is one of thirteen Unitarian chapels in Southern Ceredigion. It was agreed to build the first Chapel in Bwlchyfadfa in 1812, and the foundation stone for the current Chapel was laid in 1905.

There are no restrictions on specific beliefs - individuals are encouraged to work out their own faith. The principle is that individuals have freedom for views and beliefs that are based on love, facilitating tolerance towards other views.

The congregation meets every fortnight through the medium of Welsh.

=== St David's Church Talgarreg ===
The official opening of St David's Church was on 19 May 1899. Usually, Talgarreg Church holds bilingual services every fortnight, namely the first and third Sunday of each month, which includes Morning Prayer and Communion.

== Other Organisations and Associations ==
=== Neuadd Goffa Talgarreg (Memorial Hall) ===
The Neuadd Goffa was built to remember the boys and men from the area who lost their lives in the 1914-1918 World War. The official opening of the Hall was on 11 July 1923.

The Neuadd (Hall) is a community resource which is run by a committee whose members are representatives of various organisations in the village. Members of the committee, in turn monthly, also clean the Neuadd (Hall).

Throughout the years the committee has succeeded in attracting grants from various places to be able to make improvements to the building and to buy land to provide a car park for the users.

Extensive use is made of the Neuadd (Hall) by the Cylch Meithrin, the school, Merched y Wawr and the yoga lessons.

A variety of activities and events are held in the Neuadd (Hall) - coffee mornings, dinner for the locals, plays, concerts, christening teas, birthday parties and the occasional wedding feast.

The Neuadd (Hall) is available for everyone to hire for events.

One special aspect of the Neuadd's history is all the voluntary work that is carried out in improving and maintaining the Neuadd (Hall), and in its day-to-day running. An attitude that is typical of all the activity in this village throughout the years.

=== The Urdd Aelwyd and Adran ===
The opening of the Aelwyd in Talgarreg was held on 27 December 1941. Traditionally Aelwyd yr Urdd is for young people over 14 and the Adran yr Urdd for those under 14, and both are affiliated to Urdd Gobaith Cymru.

The building of the old woolen factory in the village, which is now part of Islwyn, was bought by the Village Committee and this is where the Aelwyd was held. Aelwyd activities included concerts, plays, games, literature and rural crafts classes, lectures, whist drives, and twmpathau.

Due to the deterioration of the building some of the activity gradually moved to the school and to the Neuadd Goffa (Memorial Hall). The Aelwyd building was eventually sold, in 1993, to the Islwyn family.

Since then the Adran has been meeting in the Neuadd Goffa (Memorial Hall). Children from year 2 to year 9 have been meeting every other week during the Autumn and Spring term. There is no Aelwyd as such, but two extremely active and lively Young Farmers Clubs serve the village and keep the young people busy, naturally through the medium of Welsh – Clwb Ffermwyr Ifanc Pontsian and Clwb Ffermwyr Ifanc Caerwedros.

=== Senior Citizens' Society (Cymdeithas yr Henoed) ===
The Cymdeithas yr Henoed was established in October 1967 with the aim of promoting the general welfare of Talgarreg's elderly. The Association is registered with the Charity Commission. Representatives from the village's organisations are members of the Association's committee.

A number of changes have been made seen since the Association was established but the aim is still the same, which is to create opportunities to socialise and to bring people together. By now, the elderly is defined as residents aged 70+ within the Talgarreg postcode who have lived within the catchment area for over two years.

=== Mabolgampau (sports day) ===
The village sports day takes place once a year during the summer.

The day is now held in the school's playground. The activity has varied slightly over the years - initially with a carnival - with a float from Talgarreg, Pantcoch, Pisgah and Bwlchyfadfa; and then costume competitions; races of all kinds, including Ras Siôn Cwilt; rounders; Tug of War competition; and a Treasure Hunt taking place the night before. Until recently a Dog Show was also part of the day.

The village sports day was held for the first time in 1956.

=== Merched y Wawr ===
Merched y Wawr Talgarreg was founded on 15 March 1968, one of the first branches in Ceredigion.

The purpose of the organisation was that women who did not have the opportunity or the time to go out to work due to family circumstances, such as raising children and helping on the family farm, had the opportunity to socialise and learn new skills, such as knitting, crocheting, organising flowers, calligraphy and so on, and to do so naturally through the medium of Welsh.

The branch meets monthly on the first Tuesday of the month in the Neuadd Goffa (Memorial Hall).

=== Talgarreg Vintage Society ===
The Talgarreg Vintage Society has been meeting for over a quarter of a century, meeting in the pub once a month, usually on the last Thursday of the month.

The Society holds a show annually in the village – showing old working machinery as well as products, with profits from the show going towards good causes and charities, chosen by the Society.
