= T. Llew Jones =

Welsh children's writer

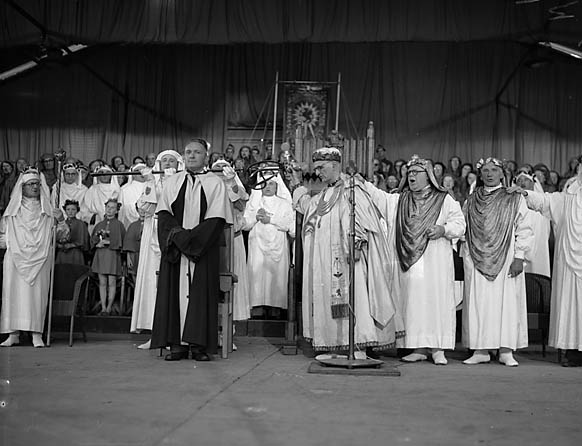
Chairing ceremony of the National Eisteddfod, Ebbw Vale, 1958, won by T. Llew Jones, also includes Erfyl Fychan, William Morris, Cynan, Crwys and Trefin.

Thomas Llewelyn Jones (11 October 1915 – 9 January 2009) was a Welsh language author. Over a writing career of more than 50 years, he became one of the most prolific and popular authors of children's books in Welsh. He wrote, and was generally known, as T. Llew Jones.

== Biography ==
T. Llew Jones was born at 1 Bwlch Melyn, Pentrecwrt, Llandysul. Educated at Ysgol Gynradd Capel Graig and Llandysul Grammar School, he was a primary school teacher in various schools in Ceredigion for 35 years before becoming a full-time writer, first at Tregroes Primary School and then at Ysgol Coedybryn near Llandysul where he became headmaster.

He first came to prominence as a poet, winning the chair at the National Eisteddfod in 1958 and then again in 1959.

He continued to write poetry, for children often, but was best known as a writer of adventure and detective novels for children. Many of these are historical novels based on the exploits of people such as Bartholomew Roberts and Twm Sion Cati. He published well over 50 books in total, including books for adults as well as children. Some of these are non-fiction titles, for example Ofnadwy Nos is an account of the wrecking of the Royal Charter. Some of his books have been translated into English and a number have been adapted for television.

He was awarded an honorary MA degree by the University of Wales in 1977. In 1991 he was awarded the Mary Vaughan Jones Award, given for outstanding contributions to children's literature in Wales. In March 2005, aged nearly 90, he won the chair in Cymdeithas Ceredigion's annual Eisteddfod.

On his 90th birthday, 4,605 cards from children across Wales were presented to him by the Welsh Books Council.

Jones died aged 93 on 9 January 2009.

A new Welsh-medium primary school, Ysgol Gynradd Gymunedol T Llew Jones, in Brynhoffnant near Llangrannog, was named in his honour in 2012. It was built to replace four small primary schools in the villages of Blaenporth, Glynarthen, Rhydlewis and Pontgarreg.

He was the father of the political activist, Emyr Llewelyn, international chess player, Iolo Ceredig Jones and Eira Prosser.

=== Chess ===
Jones was also a keen chess player, he wrote the only Welsh language chess manual together with his son, Iolo. He was one of the small group of Welsh Chess Union members and officials who instigated and fought for the secession of the WCU from the British Chess Federation (as it then was) in 1970 and its successful application to join the World Chess Federation (FIDE) as an independent member. As well as holding several posts in the WCU, Jones founded and edited Y Ddraig which grew from the Dyfed Chess Association newsletter into the magazine of Welsh chess in the 1970s. He managed the Men's 1974 Olympiad team in Nice which achieved Wales best-ever result and also the Women's team in the 1976 Olympiad in Israel. He was for many years Vice-President of the WCU.

Jones was heavily involved in Dyfed chess from the 1960s onwards, in founding and running the Dyfed Chess Association, its league, Cardigan Chess Club and the highly successful Dyfed Open Congress. At his death he was Life President of the Dyfed Chess Association. Over the board he was a keen and competitive player, but achieved his best results at postal chess, representing Welsh international teams with distinction.

== Awards and honours ==
- 1958 – Chair, Welsh National Eisteddfod, Ebbw Vale
- 1959 – Chair, Welsh National Eisteddfod, Caernarfon
- 1967 – Tir na n-Og Award for Tân ar y Comin
- 1990 – Tir na n-Og Award for Lleuad yn Olau
- 1991 – Mary Vaughan Jones Award
- 2007 – Welsh Publishing Awards, "Best Seller – Poetry", for Geiriau a Gerais

== Bibliography ==
=== Books by T. Llew Jones ===
Title	Notes	First published	Other editions
* Trysor Plas y wernen		1958	1991, Gwasg Christopher Davies & November 2005, Gwasg Gomer
* Merched y môr a chwedlau eraill		1958, Gwasg Gee, Aberystwyth	
* Trysor y Môr-Ladron		1960, Llyfrau'r Dryw	January 1989, Gwasg Gomer
* Y Merlyn Du		1960, Gwasg Aberystwyth	January 1995, Gwasg Gomer
* Anturiaethau Twm Siôn Cati: Y Ffordd Beryglus		April 1963, CLC	March 1994 & July 2000, Gwasg Gomer
* Anturiaethau Twm Siôn Cati: Ymysg Lladron		CLC	February 1999, Gwasg Gomer
* Swn Y Malu		1967, Gwasg Gomer	
* Anturiaethau Twm Siôn Cati: Dial o'r Diwedd		CLC	CLC, November 1998 & January 2004, Gwasg Gomer
* Yr Ergyd Farwol		1969, Gwasg Gomer	
* Ofnadwy Nos	Factual book	1971	31 December 1991 & January 1995, Gwasg Gomer
* Barti Ddu o Gasnewy' Bach		1973	Under the title Barti Ddu: November 1995, Gwasg Christopher Davies & February 2004, Gwasg Gomer
* Un Noson Dywyll		1973	January 2003 & February 2008, Gwasg Gomer
* Cyfrinach y Lludw		January 1975	January 1994, Gwasg Gomer
* Tân ar y Comin	Tir na n-Og Award winner	June 1975	December 1993, June 2003, Gwasg Gomer
* Arswyd y byd!		December 1975, Gwasg Gomer	
* Rwy'i Am Fod Yn Ddoctor		1976, JD Lewis	
* Ysbryd Plas Nantesgob		1976	
* Cerddi Pentalar		August 1976, Gwasg Gomer	
* Lawr ar Lan y Môr		April 1977, JD Lewis	
* Dirgelwch yr Ogof		August 1977, Gwasg Gomer	November 2002, Gwasg Gomer
* Dysgu Difyr		November 1977, JD Lewis	
* Cerddi		1979, JD Lewis	
* Slawer Dydd		December 1979, Gwasg Gomer	
* A Chwaraei di Wyddbwyll?	with his son, Iolo Ceredig Jones	31 December 1980, Gwasg Gomer	
* Dewi Emrys		1981, Cyhoeddiadau Barddas	
* Cyfoeth Awen Isfoel		June 1981, Gwasg Gomer	
* Ynys y Trysor		1986, Gwasg Mynydd Mawr	
* Rownd Y Byd mewn 80 diwrnod	Translation of Round The World in 80 Days by Jules Verne	1986, Gwasg Gomer	
* Storm		1987, Gwasg Gomer	
* Popeth am Ysbrydion		1987, Gwasg Gomer	
* Canu'n iach!		1987	October 1988, Gwasg Gomer
* Cri'r Dylluan		31 December 1988, Gwasg Gomer	March 2005, Gwasg Gomer
* Gwaed ar eu Dwylo		31 December 1988, Gwasg Gomer	
* Berw gwyllt yn Abergwaun: Hanes rhyfedd glaniad y Ffrancod yn Abergwaun yn 1797		1986, Gwasg Carreg Gwalch	
* Corff ar y Traeth		1988	February 1989, Gwasg Gomer
* Lleuad yn Olau	Tir na n-Og Award winner	20 April 1989, Gwasg Gomer	June 1999, Gwasg Gomer
* One Moonlit Night	Translation of Lleuad yn Olau; Gillian Clarke		September 1991, Gwasg Gomer
* Penillion y Plant	Illustrated by Jac Jones	January 1990, Gwasg Gomer	March 1992, Gwasg Gomer
* Cyfrinach Wncwl Daniel: Hanes Rhyfedd Hen; Feddyginiaeth Lysieuol	with Dafydd Wyn Jones	January 1992, Gwasg Gomer	
* Cancer Curers – Or Quacks?: The Story of a Secret; Herbal Remedy	with Dafydd Wyn Jones; Translation of Cyfrinach Wncwl Daniel, by Dafydd Wyn Jones	January 1993, Gwasg Gomer	
* Corn, pistol a chwip		31 December 1992, Gwasg Gomer	
*Cân y Morfilod	Translation of a book by Dyan Sheldon	CLC	
* Santa		CLC	
* Gipsy Fires	Translation of his novel Tân ar y Comin, with Carol Byrne Jones	January 1994, Pont Books	
* Y Gelyn ar y Trên		January 1994	June 2004, Gwasg Gomer
* Jona Ym Mol y Morfil		January 1994, Gwasg Cambria	
* Llyfrau Darllen Newydd: Llyfr 1		1994	June 2000, Gwasg Gomer
* Llyfrau Darllen Newydd: Llyfr 2		1996	January 1996, Gwasg Gomer
* Hen Gof : Ysgrifau llên gwerin		1996	
* Trysorau T. Llew: Modrwy Aur y Bwda a Storïau Eraill	Collection, illustrated by Jac Jones	Wedi eu cyhoeddi eisioes	November 1997, Gwasg Gomer
* Trysorau T. Llew: Y Môr yn eu Gwaed	Siân Lewis's selection from T. Llew Jones' exciting novels	November 1997, Gwasg Gomer	
* Llyfrau Darllen Newydd: Llyfr 3		1997	July 2000, Gwasg Gomer
* Llyfrau Darllen Newydd: Llyfr 4		November 1998, Gwasg Gomer	
* Lladron Defaid	Welsh adaptation of The Wild Morgans by Alison Morgan	May 2001, Gwasg Gomer	
* Storïau Cwm-pen-llo	Collection of 4 stories	Appeared in Pethe Plant in 1976	1 November 2001, Gwasg Carreg Gwalch
* Fy Mhobol I	Autobiography	August 2002, Gwasg Gomer	March 2003, Gwasg Gomer
* Trysorfa T. Llew Jones	ed. Tudur Dylan Jones, illustrated by Jac Jones	November 2004, Gwasg Gomer	
* Bocs Anrheg		October 2005, Gwasg Gomer	
* Geiriau a Gerais		November 2006, Gwasg Gomer	
* Cerddi newydd i blant (o bob oed)			
* Gormod o Raff			
* Helicopter! help! : a storiau eraill			

=== CDs ===
- Lleuad yn Olau – Chwedlau Traddodiadol o Gymru, November 2003, re-printed February 2005 (Tympan)

=== Books edited by T. Llew Jones ===
- Cerddi Gwlad Ac Ysgol, October 1976, Gwasg Gomer
- Tales the Wind Told, August 1979, JD Lewis
- Cerddi Bardd y Werin – Detholiad o Farddoniaeth Crwys, January 1994, Gwasg Gomer

=== Books about T. Llew Jones ===
- Teifi, Siân Cyfaredd y cyfarwydd : astudiaeth o fywyd a gwaith y prifardd T. Llew Jones
- Cyfrol deyrnged y Prifardd T. Llew Jones (edited by Gwynn ap Gwilym)
