= Steffan Thomas =

Welsh rugby union player (born 1997)

- Born: 27 April 1997 (age 29) Carmarthen, Wales
- Height: 1.79 m (5 ft 10 1/2 in)
- Weight: 118 kg (18.6 st; 260 lb)
- School: Ysgol Dyffryn Teifi
- Notable relative: Gareth Thomas (cousin)

Rugby union career
- Position: Loosehead Prop
- Current team: Ospreys
Senior career
Years	Team	Apps	(Points)
2017–2024	Scarlets	53	(0)
2024–	Ospreys	21	(0)
- Correct as of 6 February 2026
International career
Years	Team	Apps	(Points)
2017	Wales U20	9	(0)
- Correct as of 6 February 2026

Steffan Thomas (born 27 April 1997) is a Welsh rugby union player, who plays as a prop for Ospreys in the United Rugby Championship.

== Early career ==
From Carmarthen, Thomas played youth rugby for Newcastle Emlyn RFC. He attended Ysgol Dyffryn Teifi and Coleg Sir Gâr, and was part of the Scarlets academy. Thomas played for Carmarthen Quins in the Welsh Rugby Union Premiership.

== Professional career ==
=== Scarlets ===
Thomas made his Scarlets debut in Round 2 of the 2017–18 Anglo-Welsh Cup against the Exeter Chiefs. He has remained in the Scarlets squad since making a further two appearances, signing a contract extension in August 2020. Thomas signed a further extension on 22 April 2022.

=== Ospreys ===
On 5 April 2024, Thomas signed with Ospreys. He made his debut on 21 September 2024 against Dragons, replacing his cousin Gareth Thomas.

=== Wales U20 ===
Thomas represented Wales U20 in the 2017 Six Nations Under 20s Championship.
