= Thomas Benjamin =

Thomas Benjamin may refer to:

- Thomas Brooke Benjamin (1828–1995), American physicist
- Thomas Benjamin (poet) (1850–1925), Welsh-American poet, also known as Cynfelyn
