= Ffostrasol =

Village in Ceredigion, Wales

Coordinates: 52.103°N 4.377°W

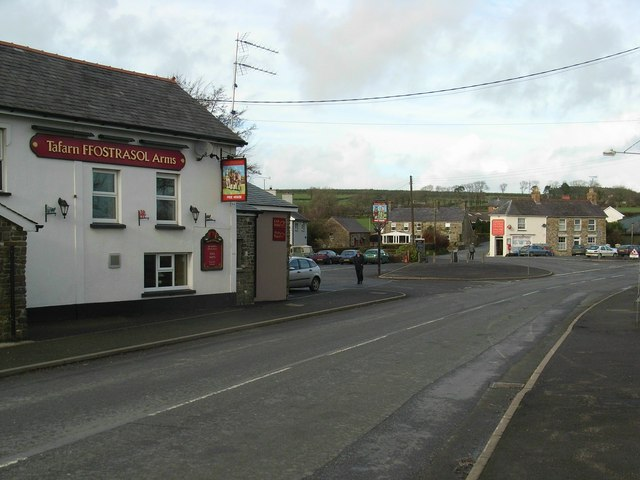
Tafarn Ffostrasol / Ffostrasol Arms at the village centre

Ffostrasol is a small village in the south of Ceredigion, Wales. It is located on the A486 between Synod Inn and Llandysul, and it forms part of the parish of Troedyraur. The village lies on a rural crossroad connecting it with the nearby village of Plwmp to the north, Synod Inn to the north east, Newcastle Emlyn to the south west, and Llandysul to the south east.

Village amenities include the Ffostrasol Arms inn (Tafarn Ffostrasol in Welsh) and a garage. There is also a local football club, called Ffostrasol Wanderers AFC, and the village has a team which compete in Talwrn y Beirdd, a poetry programme broadcast on Radio Cymru.

== Notable people ==
- Thomas Cynfelyn Benjamin (1850–1925), Welsh language poet and congregational minister, lived at Bwlchyrelmen, Ffostrasol between 1911 and 1918
