= A486 =

A486 may refer to:

- A486 road (Wales)
- RFA Regent (A486), a ship
