= Gareth Thomas (rugby union, born 1993) =

Wales international rugby union player

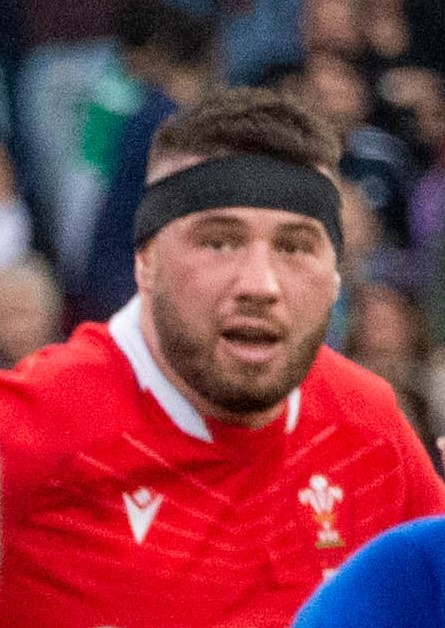
- Thomas representing Wales during the Six Nations Championship
- Born: 2 August 1993 (age 33) Newcastle Emlyn, Wales
- Height: 1.88 m (6 ft 2 in)
- Weight: 118 kg (260 lb; 18 st 8 lb)
- School: Ysgol Dyffryn Teifi
- Notable relative: Steffan Thomas (cousin)

Rugby union career
- Position: Loosehead Prop
- Current team: Ospreys
Senior career
Years	Team	Apps	(Points)
2011–2014	Carmarthen Quins	47	(5)
2012–2013	Scarlets	2	(0)
2013–2014	Llanelli	26	(0)
2014–	Ospreys	147	(25)
- Correct as of 13 August 2026
International career
Years	Team	Apps	(Points)
2012–2013	Wales U20	13	(5)
2021–	Wales	45	(0)
- Correct as of 13 August 2026

Gareth Thomas (born 2 August 1993) is a Welsh professional rugby union player who plays as a prop for United Rugby Championship club Ospreys and the Wales national team.

== Club career ==
Thomas made his debut for the Ospreys regional team in 2014 having previously played for Carmarthen Quins, Llanelli RFC and Newcastle Emlyn RFC. He was also connected to the Scarlets region before joining the Ospreys.

His cousin is fellow Ospreys loosehead prop Steffan Thomas.

== International career ==
Thomas was selected in the Wales squad for the 2021 July rugby union tests and made his debut off the bench against Canada.

He was selected in the Wales squad for the 2021 Autumn Nations Series.

Thomas started all three tests against South Africa in 2022, and part of a famous first Welsh victory on South African soil.

Thomas was named in the squad for the 2026 Six Nations by Steve Tandy.
