= Cwrtnewydd =

Village in Ceredigion, Wales

Coordinates: 52°6′43″N 4°12′20″W

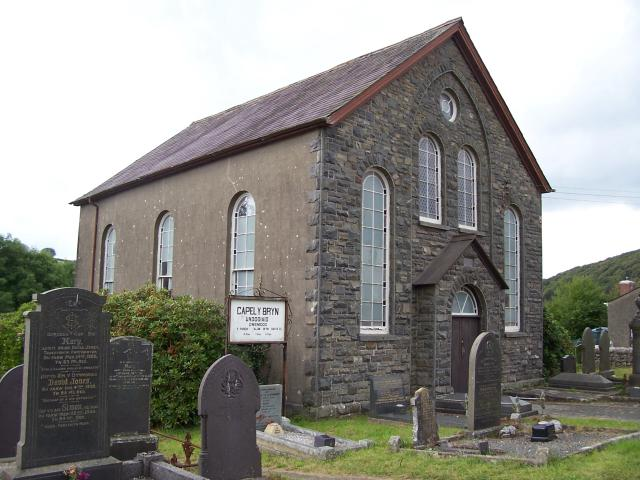
- Capel-y-Bryn, Cwrtnewydd

- Location within Ceredigion
- Community: Llanwenog
- Principal area: Ceredigion
- Preserved county: Dyfed
- Country: Wales
- Sovereign state: United Kingdom
- Postcode district: SA
- Police: Dyfed-Powys
- Fire: Mid and West Wales
- Ambulance: Welsh
- UK Parliament: Ceredigion Preseli

Cwrtnewydd, also spelled Cwrt-newydd or Cwrt Newydd, is a village in the community and parish of Llanwenog, towards the south of the county of Ceredigion, Wales.

Cwrtnewydd is on the B4338 road, north of the A475, just to the west of the town of Lampeter and to the northwest of Llanybydder.

== Notable people ==
- Abel Morgan (1673–1722), Welsh Baptist minister, born in Cwrtnewydd
- David Bevan Jones (1807–1863), (AKA Dewi Elfed), Baptist minister in Cwrtnewydd, bard, and leading figure in the Latter Day Saint movement
- David Thomas (1828–1909), (AKA Dewi Hefin), poet and teacher, schoolmaster in Cwrtnewydd
- David Rees Davies (1875–1964), poet and local historian, born in Cwrtnewydd
- Edgar Evans (1912–2007), operatic tenor, born in Cwrtnewydd
