= Carol Byrne Jones =

Welsh producer and teacher

Carol Byrne Jones was a Welsh teacher, lecturer, producer and poet. She was the producer of the film Tân ar y Comin (English: A Christmas Reunion) based on the novel by T. Llew Jones and published an English translation called Gipsy Fires.

== Early life and education ==
Carol Byrne Jones grew up in the Teifi Valley. She studied at Llandysul Grammar School and Cardiff University. After leaving college, she became a drama organiser for Breconshire.

== Career ==
Carol Byrne Jones became a lecturer in Dublin and then taught drama and English in Cardigan. After leaving teaching she worked for HTV and became its first female director.

After that, she formed her own company, Y Wennol Cyf, which produced the film Tân ar y Comin (known in English as A Christmas Reunion), based on the novel by T. Llew Jones. It was shot in Penyrallt, Carmarthenshire. In 1994, she also translated the novel into English with the title Gipsy Fires.

She became a lecturer in film and drama at Lampeter University and earned a doctorate. She was also Production Lecturer in the Department of Theatre, Film and Television at Aberystwyth University.

== Personal life ==
Carol Byrne Jones lived in Aberporth and had two sons. She was editor of the local paper Y Gambo, as well as attending a local singing class and poetry discussion group. She was also vice-president of the literary association, Cymdeith Ceredigion, which ran the local Eisteddfod.

She died, aged 80, in Glangwili Hospital, Carmarthen after a short illness.
