= Login Halt railway station =

Disused railway station in Login, Carmarthenshire

Login Halt
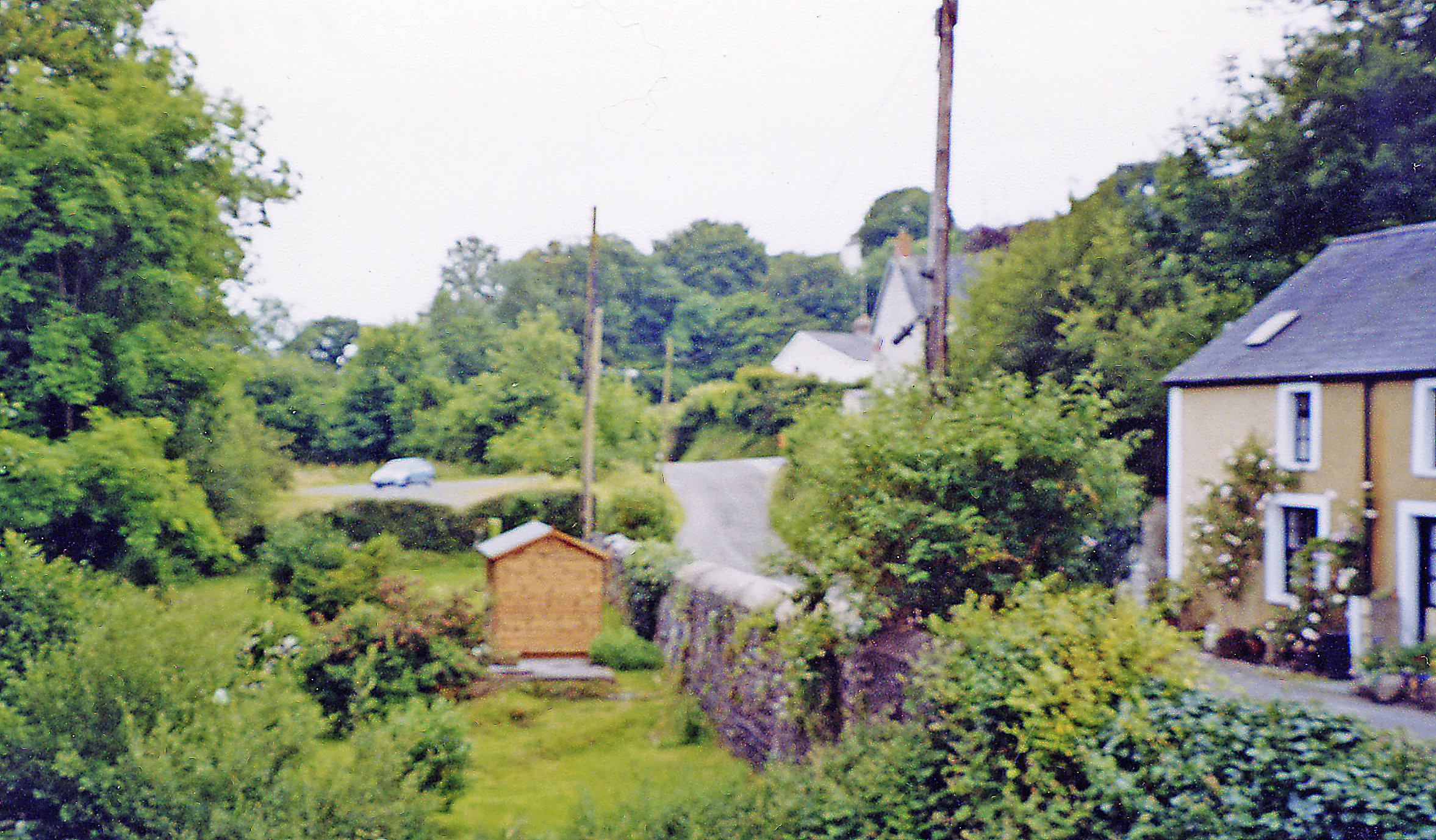
- The site of the station, before its restoration, in 2003

General information
- Location: Login, Carmarthenshire; Wales
- Coordinates: 51.879°N 4.6644°W
- Grid reference: SN167234
- Platforms: 1

Other information
- Status: Disused

History
- Original company: Whitland and Taf Vale Railway
- Pre-grouping: Whitland and Cardigan Railway
- Post-grouping: Great Western Railway; British Railways (Western Region)

Key dates
- 12 July 1875: Opened as Login
- September 1956: Name changed to Login Halt
- 10 September 1962: Closed
Location

Login Halt railway station served the hamlet of Login, Carmarthenshire, Wales, from 1875 to 1962 on the Whitland and Cardigan Railway.

== History ==
The station was opened on 12 July 1875 by the Whitland and Taf Vale Railway. It was situated south of a junction between two minor roads. The original station only had a wooden shed as a station building. A new station was built in 1886. This had a large station building which incorporated the stationmaster's House, a booking office and a waiting room. This was at the north end of the platform. To the north end was a ground frame in a wooden cabin which controlled a goods siding. The station was downgraded to a halt in September 1956, thus the suffix 'halt' was added to its name. Staff still worked at the station to operate the ground frame. The station closed on 10 September 1962. It has been restored since; the station building's windows have been rebuilt with timber, the platform has been restored and the ground frame, as well as its signs, have been found after being buried in 50 years worth of undergrowth.

Preceding station	Disused railways	Following station
Llanglydwen; Line and station closed	Whitland and Cardigan Railway	Llanfalteg Halt; Line and station closed
