= Highmead School =

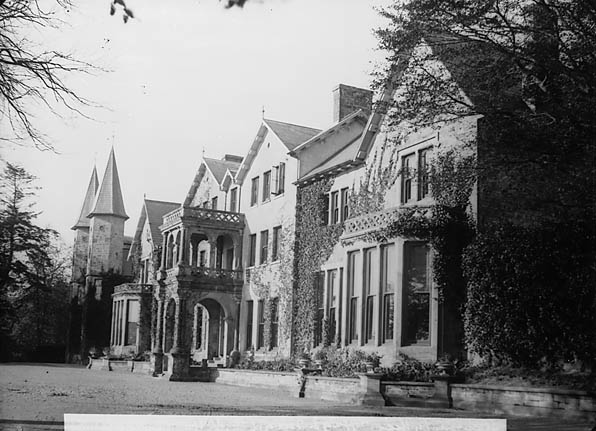
An older photo of the building, before it closed.

Highmead School is a former school building, in Highmead near Llanybydder, west Wales; it stands near the River Teifi. It was built in 1777, as a mansion. It was then converted into a local boarding school in 1956. In 1996, the school closed, and it remains unused.

The school was called the 'European Institute of Human Sciences' (EIHU) and was an Islamic college for Islamic studies, including the Arabic language. Not too long before its closure, the school was convicted of holding secretive meetings and radicalisation training. Rumours then spread that everyone had left, and since then, the school has closed and has been abandoned.

In 2016, the school, described as "frozen in time", was put up for sale, with all its contents.
