= Cynfelyn =

Cynfelyn may refer to:

- Cunobeline, Welsh king, reigned ca. 9 CE - 40 CE
- Thomas Benjamin (poet) (1850-1925), Welsh-American poet
