= Faerdrefawr =

Village in Ceredigion, Wales

Coordinates: 52.055590°N 4.295279°W

- Location within Ceredigion
- OS grid reference: SN 4272 4218
  - Cardiff: 62.2 mi (100.1 km)
  - London: 182 mi (293 km)
- Community: Llandysul
- Principal area: Ceredigion
- Country: Wales
- Sovereign state: United Kingdom
- Post town: Llandysul
- Postcode district: SA44
- Police: Dyfed-Powys
- Fire: Mid and West Wales
- Ambulance: Welsh
- UK Parliament: Ceredigion Preseli
- Senedd Cymru – Welsh Parliament: Ceredigion Penfro

Faerdrefawr is a small village in the community of Llandysul, Ceredigion, Wales, which is 62.2 miles (100 km) from Cardiff and 182 miles (293 km) from London. Faerdrefawr is represented in the Senedd by Elin Jones (Plaid Cymru) and is part of the Ceredigion Preseli constituency in the House of Commons.

== See also ==
- List of localities in Wales by population
