= Abel Morgan =

Welsh Baptist minister (1673–1722)

Abel Morgan (1673 – 16 December 1722) was a Welsh Baptist minister, best known for the posthumously published work Cyd-goriad Egwyddorawl o'r Scrythurau (English: The Joint Principles of the Scriptures) the First Biblical concordance to be written in the Welsh language and the second Welsh book printed in British America.

== Early life ==
Morgan was born at Allt-goch in Cwrtnewydd, in the parish of Llanwenog, Cardiganshire in 1673. The son of Morgan Rhydderch, deacon at Rhydwilym, Morgan moved to Abergavenny at an early age to become a member of Llanwenarth's Baptist church. His career as a preacher began in 1692 and he was ordained in Blaenau Gwent in 1700, having received a call to preach in the region, c. 1696.

== Emigration to the Americas ==
Morgan decided to emigrate to the New World in September 1711, though he did not arrive in North America until February the following year. Abel Morgan landed in the Province of Pennsylvania and held the pastorate of the Pennepack Baptist Church from his arrival, an historic Baptist church in Philadelphia that is one of the oldest Baptist congregations in North America. His brother, Enoch Morgan (1676-1740), was already minister for the congregation of the Welsh Tract Baptist Church in Newcastle County, Delaware, which sprung from the Pennepack Baptist Church over a disagreement concerning the practice of the 'laying on of the hands.'

== Later life and death ==
In 1716, Morgan translated a formal confession of faith that had been signed by the Welsh Tract Church's congregants concerning official Baptist doctrine and practices. Morgan was pastor of the Pennepack Baptist Church until his death on 16 December 1722, and his translations of the Biblical concordance were published in Philadelphia in 1730, eight years after his death. He was originally buried at the back of Pennepack Baptist Church in Lagrange Place. His remains were later moved to Mount Moriah Cemetery, Philadelphia.

== Personal life and family ==
Morgan was married three times during his life. His first wife, Priscilla Powell, and their son died during his initial voyage to North America, though their daughter survived. He later remarried Martha Burrows, and after her death married Judith Gooding née Griffiths, the widowed daughter of Thomas Griffiths (1645–1725), who had served as the first pastor for the Welsh Tract Baptist Church for twenty-five years. Morgan fathered three sons and one daughter from Gooding. One of his sons, also named Abel Morgan, became a prominent preacher during the First Great Awakening and the American War of Independence.

== Sources ==
- The Cambrian (1881), pp. 188–190.
- Conrad, Henry C., Records of the Welsh Tract Baptist Meeting: Pencader Hundred, New Castle County, Delaware, 1701 to 1828 in Two Parts - Part One (Wilmington, Delaware: John M. Rogers Press, 1908), pp. 7–9.
- Geiriadur Bywgraffyddol o Enwogion Cymru, Volume II, pp. 276–277.
- Geiter, Mary K., 'Morgan, Abel (1673–1722),' Oxford Dictionary of National Biography (Oxford: Oxford University Press, 2004)
- Hanes y Bedyddwyr ymhlith y Cymry, 1885, pp. 355–356.
- Hanes y Bedyddwyr yn Nghymru, 1893-1907, Volume III, p. 108.
- National Library of Wales Journal, Volume II, pp. 116–117.
- National Library of Wales Journal, Volume III, pp. 19–22.
- National Library of Wales, NLW MS 9258
- National Library of Wales, NLW MS 9267
- Rhydwilym church register (access from the National Library of Wales)
- 'Y Cenhadwr Americanaidd sef cylchgrawn gwybodaeth fuddiol a dyddorawl i Gymry America,' The American Messenger, 1880 (New York: Utica, 1840-1901), pp. 325–325.
