= Rhydowen Halt railway station =

Disused railway station in Rhydowen, Ceredigion

Rhydowen

General information
- Location: Rhydowen, Carmarthenshire; Wales
- Coordinates: 51.9248°N 4.6264°W
- Grid reference: SN195284
- Platforms: 1

Other information
- Status: Disused

History
- Original company: Whitland and Taf Vale Railway
- Pre-grouping: Whitland and Cardigan Railway
- Post-grouping: Great Western Railway; British Railways (Western Region)

Key dates
- 12 July 1875: Opened as Rhydowen
- September 1956: Name changed to Rhydowen Halt
- 10 September 1962: Closed
Location

Rhydowen Halt railway station served the small settlement of Rhydowen, Carmarthenshire, Wales, from 1875 to 1962 on the Whitland and Cardigan Railway.

== History ==
The station was opened on 12 July 1875 by the Whitland and Taf Vale Railway. It was situated south of an unnamed minor road. The original station only had a wooden shed as a station building. A new station was built in 1886. This had a waiting room and a booking office, both made of timber. Opposite the platform was the goods yard with a loop that served a cattle dock. Nearby was a ground frame in a wooden cabin which controlled the adjacent level crossing and allowed access to the goods yard. It was downgraded to a halt in September 1956, thus the suffix 'Halt' was added to its name, but it remained staff to use the ground frame. The station closed on 10 September 1962.

Preceding station	Disused railways	Following station
Llanfyrnach; Line and station closed	Whitland and Cardigan Railway	Llanglydwen; Line and station closed
