= Pren-gwyn =

Village in Ceredigion, Wales

Coordinates: 52.073496°N 4.299720°W

- Location within Ceredigion
- OS grid reference: SN 4248 4418
  - Cardiff: 63.1 mi (101.5 km)
  - London: 182.5 mi (293.7 km)
- Community: Llandysul
- Principal area: Ceredigion
- Country: Wales
- Sovereign state: United Kingdom
- Post town: Llandysul
- Postcode district: SA44
- Police: Dyfed-Powys
- Fire: Mid and West Wales
- Ambulance: Welsh
- UK Parliament: Ceredigion Preseli
- Senedd Cymru – Welsh Parliament: Ceredigion

Pren-gwyn is a small village in the community of Llandysul, Ceredigion, Wales, which is 63.1 miles (101.6 km) from Cardiff and 182.5 miles (293.6 km) from London. Pren-gwyn is represented in the Senedd by Elin Jones (Plaid Cymru) and the Member of Parliament is Ben Lake (Plaid Cymru).

The name is derived from the Welsh language term for 'white wood'.

== See also ==
- List of localities in Wales by population
