= Edgar Evans (tenor) =

Welsh opera singer

Edgar Evans (9 June 1912 – 22 February 2007) was a Welsh opera singer. His most famous role was Hermann in Tchaikovsky's The Queen of Spades at the Royal Opera House, Covent Garden.

Evans was born in Cwrtnewydd, Cardiganshire, Wales. In all, he sang some 45 roles—most of them major ones—at Covent Garden from 1946, when, as one of its three principal tenors, he became a founder member of the Covent Garden Opera Company to his retirement in 1975. In that time, he sang more roles and more performances at the Opera House than any other artist.

Those roles included Steva in the first British stage performance of Jenůfa, Zinovy in the British premiere of Katerina Ismailova, The Interpreter and A Celestial Messenger in the premiere of Vaughan Williams' The Pilgrim's Progress, Andres in the first Covent Garden Wozzeck and Captain Davidson in Richard Rodney Bennett's Victory. In addition, he was Dmitri in the company's first Boris Godunov, Hermann in the first Covent Garden Queen of Spades under Kleiber, Gustavus in the first Masked Ball performed at Covent Garden since the War, Aegisthus in the first post-War Elektra, Helenus in The Trojans conducted by Kubelík, Narraboth in the Brook-Dalí Salome, and Froh in the first post-War Covent Garden Ring.

== Early life ==
The son of a farmer and the youngest—by eight years—of 13 children, Evans heard the voice of Enrico Caruso over the radio when he was a young boy. From then on his only ambition was to be a singer, despite his father's ambitions for him to become a banker or an architect.

Completely untaught, Evans practised both 'preaching' in the declamatory 'Welsh chapel' style and singing in a barn-cum-boilerhouse on the farm. He received no encouragement as a boy, being always told that he sang too loudly. At 11 he entered the local Eisteddfod as a singer unsuccessfully, but by the age of 17 he had improved enough to steal the show at an end of term concert at his secondary school in Cei Newydd. He went on to win various prizes at local Eisteddfodau as a baritone.

== First steps in singing career ==
The opportunity to take up singing professionally came when Evans (by now an articled pupil to the County Architect) was heard singing 'Loch Lomond' by a talent scout in a pub called The Irish House, Piccadilly, while on a rugby trip to London in 1935. He was taken immediately to The Odd Spot nightclub in London's West End, from where he was referred to Arthur Fagg, conductor of the London Choral Society, who knew Dawson Freer, a singing teacher at the Royal College of Music.

One week later, Evans became a pupil of Freer's, who began by telling him that he sang too loudly. These early lessons helped Evans to establish himself as a professional singer, but he felt that his voice and vocal technique improved immeasurably when, later in his career, the Royal Opera arranged for him to continue his studies, this time with the Italian maestro Luigi Ricci in Rome.

For 18 months, Evans studied with Dawson Freer, using up his legacy from his father, who had died in 1927, to support himself and pay the six guineas for every ten singing lessons. Running out of funds, Evans took on a milk round in Camberwell for the Royal Arsenal Co-Operative, getting up at five o'clock each morning and, eventually, progressed to the round in Coldharbour Lane in Brixton.

Some 18 months after meeting Freer, Edgar gave his first audition. As a result, Lilian Baylis offered him a contract to sing as a chorister, under the direction of chorus master Geoffrey Corbett, with the Sadler's Wells Opera Company in 1937 on a salary of £3 a week—the same wage he was getting as a milkman.

== World War II ==
From September 1939 to June 1942 he was a member of the Police Reserve, again on wages of £3 a week, having been turned down for service in the armed forces, he was dogged by kidney problems throughout his life.

Throughout the war, he was singing in shows for the Council for the Encouragement of Music and the Arts (CEMA) and ENSA, entertaining the troops, under the direction of Walter Legge and performing with artists including Maggie Teyte, Joyce Grenfell and many others. After 18 months, he left the police to concentrate on performing, and, in all, he sang in over 500 concerts during the war.

In the latter years of the war and when hostilities ceased, Edgar toured the main theatres in the UK and Europe, singing with the 'Anglo-Russian Merry Go Round Company' performing in a number of cities, including Paris.

== Post-war career ==
For a while, he was in Bernard Delfont's production of Gay Rosalinda at the Palace Theatre, in London, under the musical direction of Richard Tauber. He later worked for Delfont again in a show in Ryde, on the Isle of Wight.

A chance meeting with Henry Robinson, formerly stage manager at Sadler's Wells, resulted in Evans applying for an audition with the newly formed Covent Garden Opera Company. Singing "E lucevan le stelle" from Tosca and the "Flower Song" from Carmen, he was chosen from scores of tenor hopefuls from around the world and progressed successfully through three auditions to receive the offer of a contract from the Administrator, David Webster, in the middle of August 1946.

His first roles were as the Bird God and Lover in Purcell's The Fairy-Queen in a cast that included Michael Hordern, Constance Shacklock, Margot Fonteyn and Moira Shearer. He made his Covent Garden debut, deputising for Heddle Nash, as Des Grieux in Manon, under the direction of Reginald Goodall.

He became one of the first British singers to sing in opera abroad after the War when Erich Kleiber took him to sing in Wagner's Ring in Rome, with the Rome Opera. Later, he was the tenor soloist in Beethoven's Choral Symphony when Kleiber conducted the work at Covent Garden at a concert to help establish an artists' pension fund.

== Reviews ==
From that first appearance as Des Grieux to his farewell performance, as the butler in The Visit of the Old Lady by Gottfried von Einem at Glyndebourne in 1974, Evans was a well-respected member of the music world. His acting and vocal ability evoked comparison with the very best and elicited reviews such as:

His voice has a pleasant timbre and is produced with ease. But the most notable thing about his performance was the fact that it realised perfectly the elegant as well as the sentimental character of the melodic line. (The Daily Telegraph, April 1947, on his debut as Des Grieux in Manon)

'As the cheerful but unfortunate King of Sweden (in A Masked Ball), Edgar Evans follows in the line of some of the greatest tenors who have ever sung in opera, including Jean de Reszke and Caruso.' (Education, 27 November 1953)

Of that production of Masked Ball in 1953, singing with Gobbi, Evans commented: "Hearing Gobbi reminded me of Ricci's teaching. It inspired me to sing the best I ever sang."

== Later career ==
Within three weeks of returning from Ricci in Rome, the higher part of his vocal range now completely secure, Evans sang Calaf in Turandot under the baton of Sir John Barbirolli. He regularly demonstrated his remarkable strength of voice by singing several major roles including Pinkerton (in Madama Butterfly), Don Jose (Carmen), Max (Der Freischütz) and Peter Grimes in the same week.

Eventually the stress of this punishing schedule caught up with him and he was forced to rest for 20 weeks. After this he never resumed the preeminence among principal tenors at Covent Garden that had been his.

Subsequently, he conducted his share of masterclasses and adjudicated at singing competitions. Even in his later years, he had a regular procession of singers all anxious to learn his secrets of vocal technique and his opinion of their vocal talents and abilities.

On his retirement from Covent Garden, Evans was invited by Sir David Willcocks to join the teaching staff at the Royal College of Music. For ten years he taught vocal technique there and many singers can pay tribute to his masterly teaching.

His final public appearance as a soloist was at the wedding of Robert (Bob) and Helen Little, at Marshalswick Baptist Free Church, St Albans, on 18 October 1980. He sang "Ombra mai fù" from Handel's opera Xerxes.

He sang with leading singers; with leading orchestras, both in Britain and in Europe, and worked with leading conductors including Erich Kleiber, Karl Rankl, Sir Thomas Beecham, Sir John Barbirolli, Sir Malcolm Sargent, Sir Georg Solti, Otto Klemperer, Rudolf Kempe and Carlo Maria Giulini. Among those to whom he felt he owed a special debt of gratitude was Peter Gellhorn who, as a repetiteur and conductor at Covent Garden, taught Evans the part of Hermann in The Queen of Spades in the remarkably short time of 14 hours.

He sang the title role in Peter Grimes and Captain Vere (Billy Budd) after Peter Pears had initially brought these characters to theatrical life. He sang Dmitri in Boris Godunov, in English, under Clemens Krauss, and later in Russian; Steva in Janáček's Jenůfa under Rafael Kubelík; the Drum Major in Alban Berg's Wozzeck, under Kleiber; Calaf in Turandot under Barbirolli and many more roles. Barbirolli and Kleiber were among Evans' favourite conductors, closely followed by Kempe and Giulini.

Only the recording studio failed to do justice to Evans's robust, romantic voice. Appearances as Melot in Wagner's Tristan und Isolde (His Master's Voice) under Furtwängler; Britten's Albert Herring (Decca), with the composer conducting, and his recording of "Nessun Dorma" from Turandot are all that remain to stir the memory.

He married Nan (née Walters, died December 1998) on 19 August 1939. Their son Huw died in June 1999, and Evans had two grandchildren; Rebecca and Edward. Evans himself died in Northwick Park Hospital Harrow.

== Literature ==
- G. Davidson, Opera Biographies (Werner Laurie, London 1955), 92–93.
- Robert Little, Edgar Evans Extempore (Bob Little Press & PR, 2005). ISBN 0-9543113-1-0
- Timothy Edgar Evans, Dictionary of Welsh Biography
