= John Park Davies =

Welsh Unitarian minister (1879–1937)

John Park Davies (1879 - 1937) was a Welsh Unitarian minister and educator.

== Early life and education ==
He grew up in the Llandysul area, and attended the local Board School and County School, before gaining a place at the University College of Wales, Aberystwyth, from where he graduated in 1902, with a B.A. (Hons.) in Semitic Languages. In 1902, he began studies at Manchester College, Oxford, and, in 1904, was awarded the Russell Martineau Hebrew prize, followed by the (university) Hall-Houghton Syriac prize in 1905. He subsequently commenced studies at Harvard University, from where he graduated in 1907.

== Career ==
In 1908, Davies took up the position of Unitarian minister of Pontypridd, relocating in 1913 to take charge of the Old Presbyterian Chapel, Nantwich, and to Gateacre Chapel, Liverpool, in 1924.

In 1926 he was appointed Principal of the Presbyterian College, Carmarthen, and minister of Parc-y-Felfed Chapel.

== Death ==
He died in May 1937, and was buried at Capel Pant-y-Defaid, Ceredigion.
