= Iolo Ceredig Jones =

Welsh chess player (1947–2021)

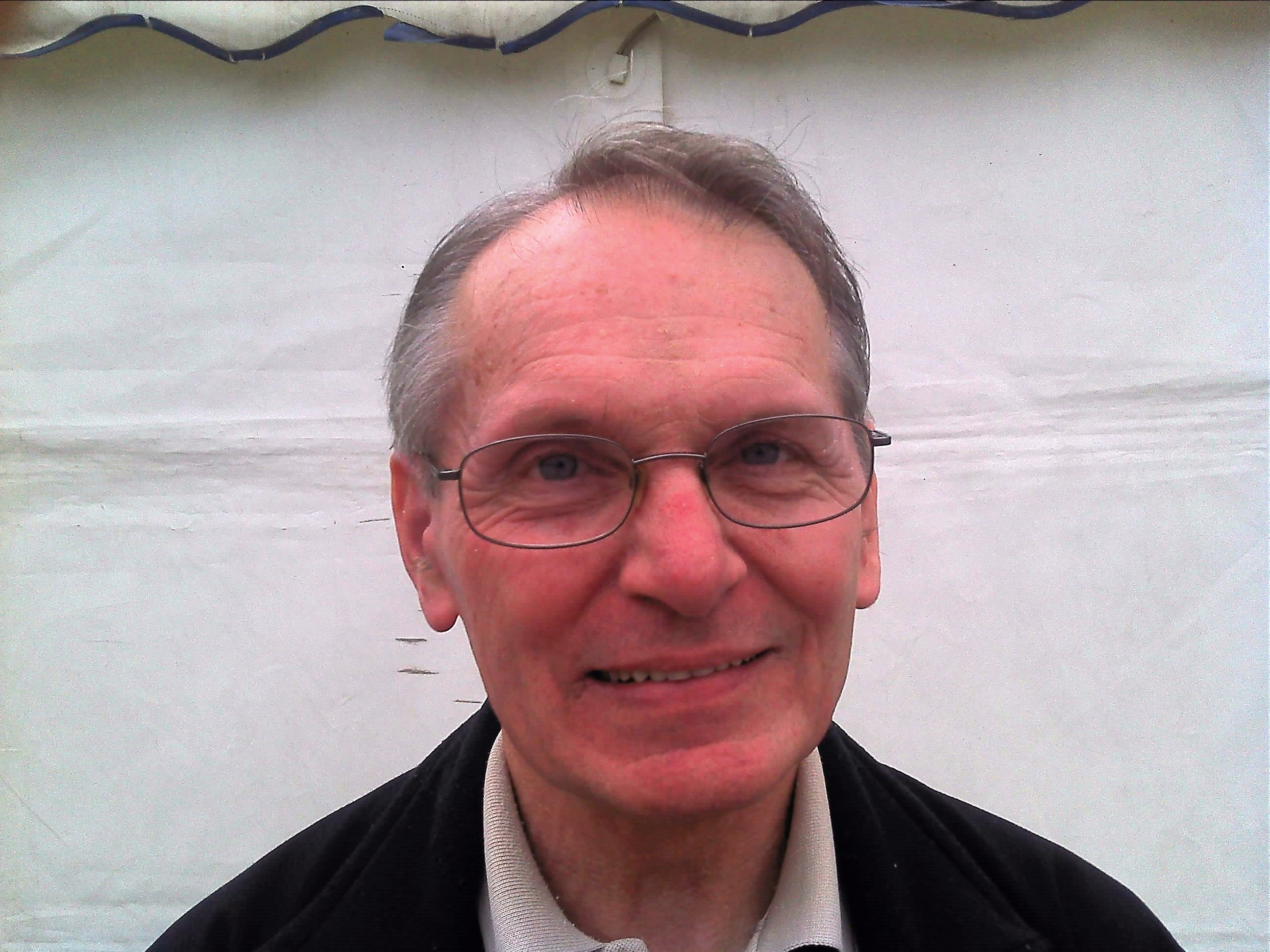

Personal information
- Born: 2 August 1947 Llandysul, Wales
- Died: 6 September 2021 (aged 74)

Chess career
- Country: Wales
- Title: FIDE Master (2013)
- Peak rating: 2295 (November 2010)

Iolo Ceredig Jones (2 August 1947 – 6 September 2021) was a Welsh former international chess player born in Llandysul. He is notable as the co-author of the only Welsh language chess manual, A chwaraei di wyddbwyll?, which he wrote with his father, T. Llew Jones.

Jones was the joint Welsh champion in 1982–83. He competed for Wales at 16 Chess Olympiads, playing in 14 consecutive Olympiads between 1972 and 1998 and won a gold medal for his performance at the 1990 Olympiad at Novi Sad, Yugoslavia. In 2011 he took a break from retirement and participated in the European Team Chess Championship for the Welsh team. In 2013 Jones received the FIDE Master that is awarded to players achieving an Elo rating of 2300 or more.

He is also the brother of the political activist and writer, Emyr Llewelyn.

Jones died in September 2021 after a short illness.
