= Rhuddlan Teifi =

Village in Ceredigion, Wales

Coordinates: 52.065264°N 4.199389°W

Rhuddlan
- Location within Ceredigion
- OS grid reference: SN 4933 4305
  - Cardiff: 59.5 mi (95.8 km)
  - London: 178.2 mi (286.8 km)
- Community: Llanwenog
- Principal area: Ceredigion
- Country: Wales
- Sovereign state: United Kingdom
- Post town: Llanybydder
- Postcode district: SA40
- Police: Dyfed-Powys
- Fire: Mid and West Wales
- Ambulance: Welsh
- UK Parliament: Ceredigion Preseli
- Senedd Cymru – Welsh Parliament: Ceredigion

Rhuddlan, also known as Rhuddlan Teifi, is a small village in the community of Llanwenog, Ceredigion, Wales. Rhuddlan is represented in the Senedd by Elin Jones (Plaid Cymru) and is part of the Ceredigion Preseli constituency in the House of Commons.

== See also ==
- Rhuddlan - town in Denbighshire.
