= Login, Carmarthenshire =

Hamlet in Carmarthenshire, Wales

Coordinates: 51.879790°N 4.667376°W

Login
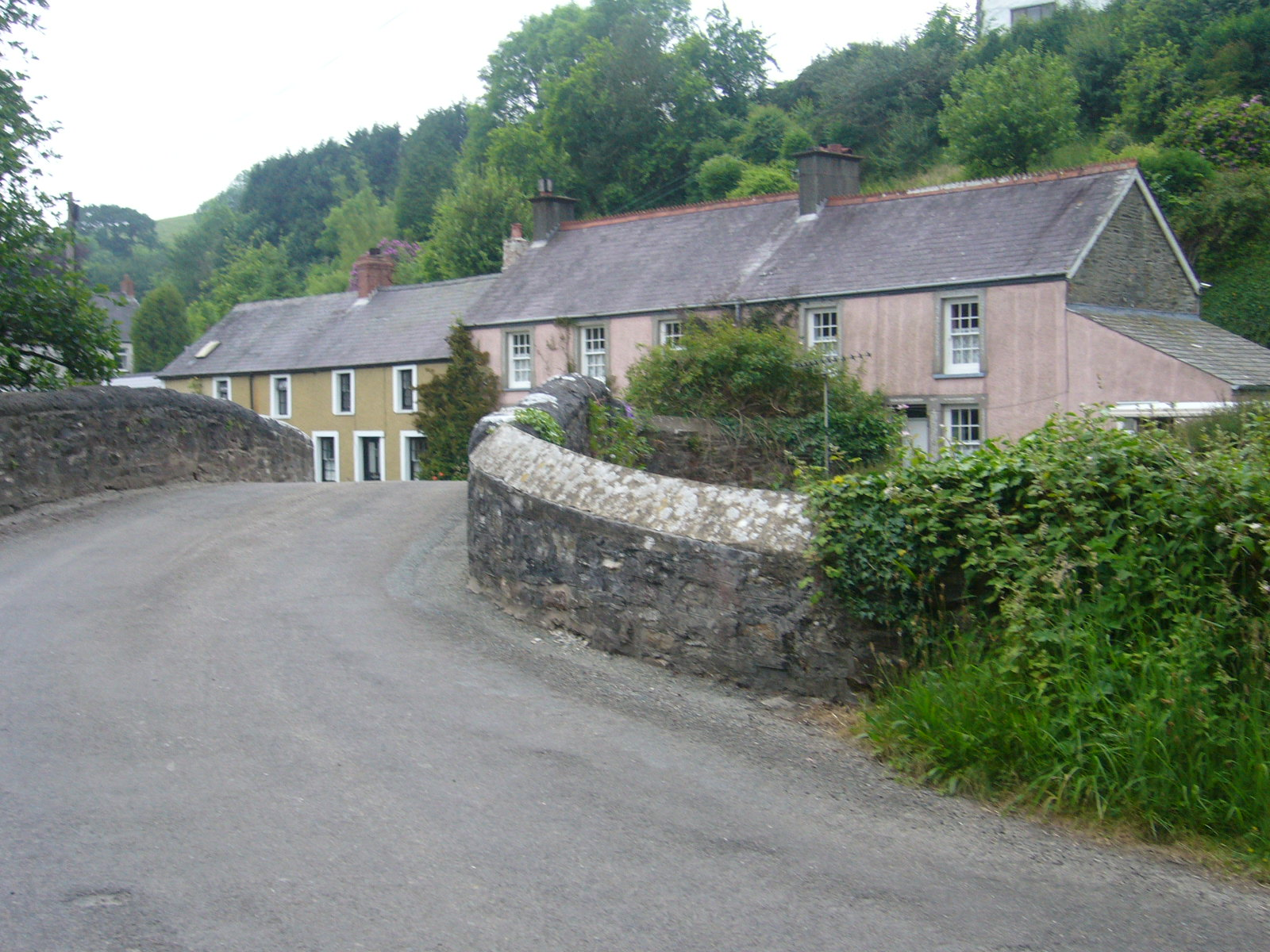

- Location within Carmarthenshire
- Community: Cilymaenllwyd
- Principal area: Carmarthenshire
- Preserved county: Dyfed
- Country: Wales
- Sovereign state: United Kingdom
- Post town: Whitland
- Postcode district: SA34 0
- Police: Dyfed-Powys
- Fire: Mid and West Wales
- Ambulance: Welsh
- UK Parliament: Caerfyrddin
- Senedd Cymru – Welsh Parliament: Carmarthen West and South Pembrokeshire

Login is a hamlet in Carmarthenshire, Wales, in the Taf valley and sits on both sides of the meandering River Taf. A stone bridge crosses the river approximately 100 metres from a ford near the weir, which used to be the original crossing place. The postal address of Login covers a larger area than that bounded by the village signs. The district is called Cilymaenllwyd, and the main chapel for the region called Calfaria is located in the village.

The region of Login consists of streams and valleys and hills, with a sparsely populated community. Cardi Bach ('little Cardi') was the local name given to the Whitland and Cardigan Railway that once ran alongside the River Taf between the towns of Whitland and Cardigan. The railway was closed in 1963 under the Beeching initiative. The Landsker Borderlands Trail, a public route for walkers, passes through Login. Some of the members of the Rebecca fraternity, active in the Rebecca Riots, were resident in Login. One of the hills is named "Radical Hill"; maybe this is in reference to the rebels, or perhaps it refers further back, to the stones deposited from the glaciers that once scoured this valley.

The village is known for its wildlife: herons, kingfisher and otters are sometimes seen on the river. Red kites and owls occupy the air at different times of day and night, and several types of bats have been recorded at dusk and dawn.

Preceding station	Historical railways	Following station
Whitland via Llanfalteg	Great Western Railway; Whitland & Cardigan Railway	Rhydowen via Llanglydwen
