= Llanglydwen railway station =

Disused railway station in Llanglydwen, Carmarthenshire

Llanglydwen
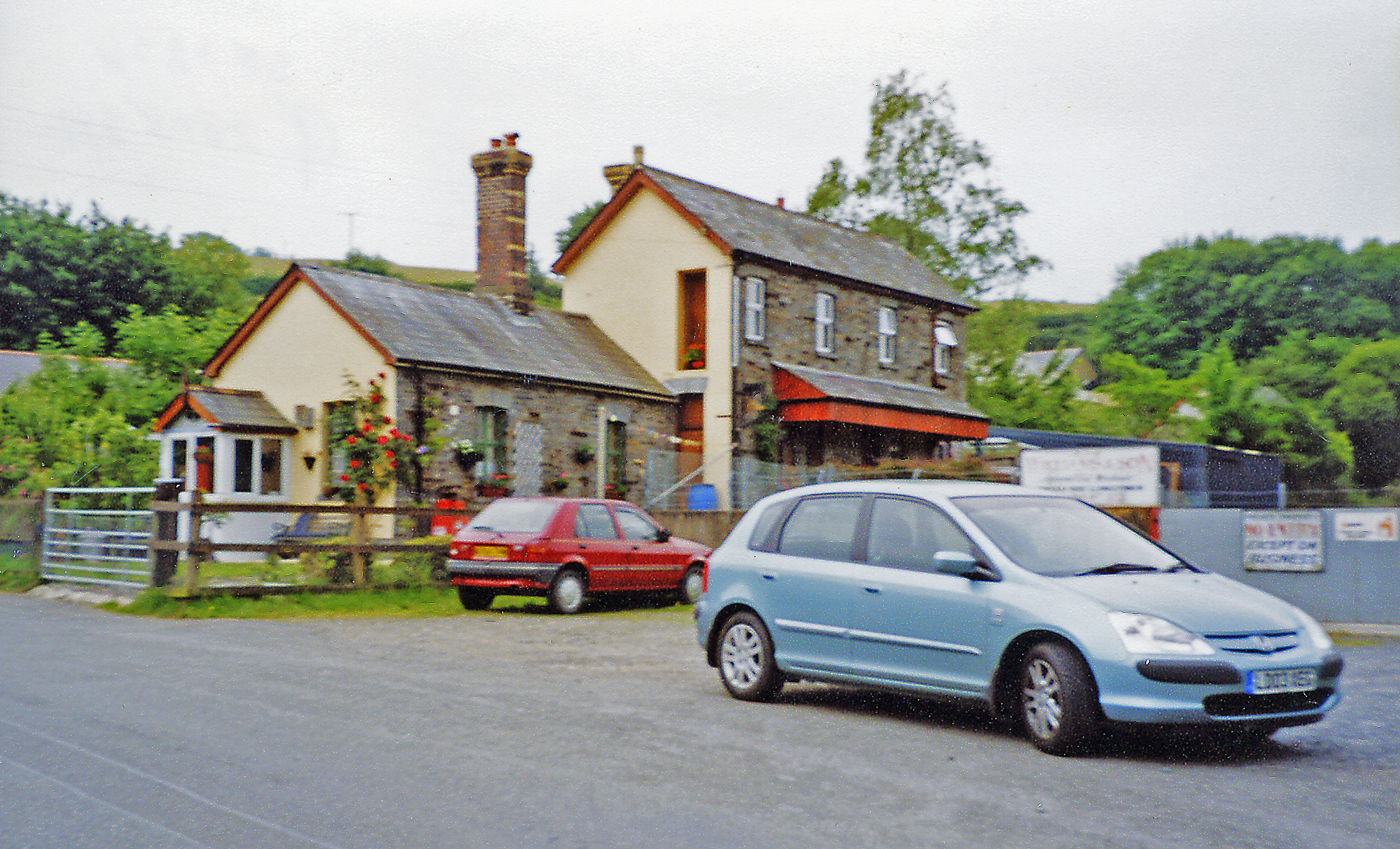
- The site of the station, looking north towards Cardigan, in 2003

General information
- Location: Llanglydwen, Carmarthenshire; Wales
- Coordinates: 51.9091°N 4.6458°W
- Grid reference: SN181267
- Platforms: 2

Other information
- Status: Disused

History
- Original company: Whitland and Taf Vale Railway
- Pre-grouping: Whitland and Cardigan Railway
- Post-grouping: Great Western Railway; British Railways (Western Region)

Key dates
- 12 July 1875: Opened
- 10 September 1962: Closed to passengers
- 27 May 1963: Closed to goods
Location

Llanglydwen railway station served the village of Llanglydwen, Carmarthenshire, Wales, from 1875 to 1963 on the Whitland and Cardigan Railway.

== History ==
The station was opened on 12 July 1875 by the Whitland and Taf Vale Railway. It was situated south of a junction in between two minor roads. The original station only had a wooden shed as a station building. A new station was built in 1886. This had a two-storey station building, incorporating the station master's house, the booking office and a waiting room. The down platform had a timber waiting shelter. Behind this platform was the goofs yard, which had one siding. Access to this was enabled by the signal box, which also controlled the level crossing and was at the south end of the up platform. There was also a busy coal yard near the station. The station closed to passengers on 10 September 1962 but remained open for goods until 27 May 1963. The coal depot closed on 2 February 1963.

Preceding station	Disused railways	Following station
Rhydowen Halt; Line and station closed	Whitland and Cardigan Railway	Login Halt; Line and station closed
