= Sioned James =

Welsh musician and conductor

- Born: Sioned Nest James; 10 September 1974; Ceredigion, Wales, UK
- Died: 19 July 2016 (aged 41)
- Occupation: Musician

Sioned Nest James (10 Sept 1974 – 19 July 2016) was a Welsh musician and conductor, known for founding the successful Cardiff-based choir Côrdydd and contributing to musical programmes on television.

== Early life and education ==
Born and brought up in Llandysul, Ceredigion, James attended Ysgol Dyffryn Teifi. In her youth she was a member of several choirs, including Teifi Singers, the National Youth Choir of Wales and Swansea Bach Choir under John Hugh Thomas. Her first opportunity to lead a choir, at 16 years old, was given to her by Islwyn Evans at the Ceredigion School of Music. James graduated from Cardiff University with first class honours in 1997.

== Career ==
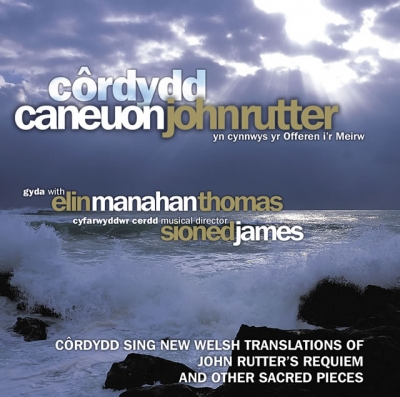
Album cover (2007)

In 1999 Sioned James collaborated with Charlie Skarbek on the Rugby World Cup CD and World in Union for Bryn Terfel and Shirley Bassey. The following year she established her own choir, Côrdydd, in Cardiff. The choir enjoyed many successes, winning BBC Radio Choir in 2003 and becoming a winner in the competition for Mixed Choir of less than 45 voices at the National Eisteddfod on several occasions. She conducted Mochyn Du Choir for many years. She was a familiar face on S4C working with TV producers as musical arranger on Coal House and drama series Con Passionate. She was choirmaster of the S4C show Codi Canu and vocal coach on The Voice Wales and Can’t Sing Singers on the BBC.

James worked as an agent for actors and TV presenters and as a part-time lecturer on the course of Theatre, Music and Media at the University of Wales, Trinity Saint David. During her career she collaborated with renowned composers including Morten Lauridsen, Eric Whitacre and Paul Mealor.

Sioned James died in 2016 at the age 41. S4C aired a tribute to her on 7 April 2017, in which current Côrdydd conductor Huw Foulkes said:"I challenge anyone to think of a Welsh conductor who's succeeded in forming as many contacts around the world; and has succeeded in transforming Welsh choral singing... [and]...her massive contribution towards music in Wales and beyond. The world is much poorer without Sioned."

== Personal life ==
James was married to TV presenter Gareth Roberts.
