= Hywel Davies (broadcaster) =

Welsh broadcaster (1919–1965)

Hywel Gethin Davies, OBE (2 February 1919 – 16 October 1965) was a Welsh radio broadcaster, television interviewer and writer. He was born in Llandysul, the son of the Independent minister Ben Davies. As a boy he attended Llandeilo Grammar School, before moving to study at the University of Edinburgh, from where he graduated with an M.A. honours in English Literature.

For a short time he was employed by Lewis Co. of Manchester, but in 1942 he moved to London and became a television announcer and news reader with the BBC, and later the editor of Welsh news. In 1946 he moved to Cardiff, where he continued to work for the BBC, from 1958 as Head of Programmes in Wales; he was considered as a future Assistant Controller and Controller. He remained in the role until his death in 1965.

He wrote for, and presented, the TV series Home Town (1952).
