= Dolgran =

Village in Carmarthenshire, Wales

Coordinates: 51.985°N 4.286°W

Dolgran is a small hamlet located in a narrow, steep-sided valley approximately one and a half miles to the south west of Pencader, Carmarthenshire, Wales, through which flows the Nant Grân. There are 12 dwellings adjacent to the unclassified road that bisects the hamlet, and the population is about 50.

The hamlet did have a smithy, a water-powered sawmill and one general store but is now largely residential, with a mixture of old and new dwellings.
