= Evan James Williams =

Welsh experimental physicist

Evan James Williams FRS
- Born: Evan James Williams; 8 June 1903; Cwmsychbant, Ceredigion, Wales
- Died: 29 September 1945 (aged 42); Brynawel, Carmarthenshire, Wales, United Kingdom
- Education: University of Swansea
- Known for: Sub-atomic particle research, anti-submarine warfare
- Awards: FRS (1939)
- Scientific career
- Fields: Physics
- Workplaces: Victoria University of Manchester; University of Cambridge; University of Liverpool; University of Aberystwyth

Evan James Williams FRS (8 June 1903 – 29 September 1945) was a Welsh experimental physicist who worked in a number of fields with some of the most notable physicists of his day, including Patrick Blackett, Lawrence Bragg, Ernest Rutherford and Niels Bohr.

Williams earned a degree at Swansea University, doctorates at Manchester and Cambridge universities and a professorship at Aberystwyth University. He was highly regarded by his colleagues, and made a Fellow of the Royal Society in 1939.

During World War 2 he worked with Blackett to devise ways of countering the devastation of shipping by German submarines.

He died of cancer in 1945 at the age of 42. Blackett broadcast a talk on Williams on BBC radio in 1949.

== Early life ==
Williams was born in the Ceredigion village of Cwmsychbant to stonemason James and Elizabeth (née Lloyd) Williams. He attended Llanwenog Primary School, then Llandysul School, where he was a close friend of Evan Tom Davies and, like Davies, excelled in mathematics. From there Williams, at the age of 16, won a £55 scholarship to Swansea University where he studied physics and attained a first-class honours degree in 1923.

== Character ==
Williams was stocky and strong, with blue eyes, brown hair and a broad grin; he was gregarious, passionate about cricket, and enjoyed practical jokes. He was a volatile but stimulating companion, and could "argue a case of sheer unreason with devastating logic"; he was a "wild driver with a complete disregard of the laws of dynamics" according to Blackett. "His love for his native Wales was profound."

== Career ==
From Swansea, Williams went into physics research at Manchester University's physics laboratories under Lawrence Bragg. At Manchester he attained a doctorate in physics in 1926 for his work with Bragg, studying X-rays in gases, then a second degree at the Cavendish Laboratory in Cambridge under Ernest Rutherford. In 1930 he obtained a University of Wales D.Sc.

Much of Williams's work was on sub-atomic particles, and in 1933 he spent a year working with Niels Bohr in Copenhagen where (Blackett considered) he did his best work. Throughout the 1930s he worked on developing theories further, and lectured in physics at Manchester and Liverpool, where he worked with James Chadwick.

In 1934 and 1935 he collaborated with W.L. Bragg on a theory of the effect of thermal agitation on the atomic arrangement in alloys. The resulting mean-field theory is called the Bragg-Williams approximation and is useful for solving many problems in statistical physics.

In 1938 Williams was appointed Chair of Physics at the University College of Wales in Aberystwyth and continued his experiments with sub-atomic particles using a cloud chamber. He was elected a Fellow of the Royal Society in March 1939. In the same month he gave a talk on BBC Radio: "The Atomic World".

Williams was the first person who experimentally detected muon decay and managed to photograph it.

=== World War 2 ===
Early on in World War 2 Blackett asked Williams to join RAE Farnborough to apply his imaginative physical mind to the problem of the U-boat menace. One of the results was the MDS (magnetic detection of submarines) system which was taken up with enthusiasm by US scientists when presented to them by Sir Henry Tizard in 1940. In 1941 Williams joined Blackett at the newly formed Operational Research Section at the Admiralty's Coastal Command where they "essentially invented" operational research; Williams was director of research from 1941 to 1942, scientific adviser to the Navy on methods of combating submarines from 1943 to 1944, then assistant director of research in the Navy from 1944 to 1945.

Williams was diagnosed with bowel cancer in 1944 and, despite two operations, he was able to visit Washington in 1945 in connection with the continuing war in the Far East, and also write a scientific paper as a tribute to Niels Bohr on his sixtieth birthday.

== Death ==
Williams died in September 1945 at his parents' home in Brynawel, Carmarthenshire, at the age of 42. He was buried at Capel y Cwm, Cwmsychbant.

His obituary for the Royal Society was written by Blackett, who also broadcast a radio appreciation of Williams in 1949, in which he said:

Looking back on Williams's short life, I am impressed by the amount he achieved. We physicists feel constantly his loss. His distinctive gift of deep physical understanding, using only relatively simple mathematics, would have been of the greatest value to us today.

In 1971 John Tysul Jones published a collection of articles about Williams.

== Legacy ==
In his 1949 BBC radio broadcast, Patrick Blackett said:

Not only was Evan James Williams a theoretical and experimental physicist of very great distinction, but he contributed outstanding work during the war to the winning of the Battle of the Atlantic against the German submarines. It was the same unique gift of clear thinking and simple analysis which made both these achievements possible.

Williams's legacy was commented upon in a 2004 BBC article:

His particular scientific area of work was the study of the mechanism of the collisions of atomic particles...Williams was always trying to picture exactly what was happening. With this emphasis he could be described as a classical physicist in the tradition of Newton and Faraday. But he recognised that a new sort of mechanics had been created. Providing important predictions of atomic events, this is...quantum mechanics.
