= Meinir Mathias =

Welsh artist (born 1981)

- Born: 1981 (age 44–45); Ceredigion, Wales
- Notable work: "Rebel" (2020), "Ar Hyd y Nos" (2024)
- Television: Cymru ar Cynfas (2021)
- Awards: National Collection (National Library of Wales)

Meinir Mathias (born 1981) is an artist from Ceredigion, Wales, working mainly with oil paint and intaglio printing techniques.

Her work relates to Welsh identity, folk imagery and political protest, with the Rebecca Riots a recurring reference as seen in her first solo exhibition, 'Rebel' (2020). The success of 'Rebel' and her 2024 exhibition 'Ar Hyd y Nos' has secured her status as one of the most important contemporary painters in Wales with several paintings purchased for the National Collection by the National Library of Wales.

She has exhibited in many prominent galleries including the Contemporary Wales exhibition at the Waterfront Gallery, Oriel Ffin y Parc, Royal Cambrian Academy of Fine Arts and Oriel Plas Glyn y Weddw.

In 2021 Mathias was part of the second series of the Cymru ar Cynfas program on S4C, where she created a portrait of the naturalist, Iolo Williams.

In 2025, to commemorate International Women's Day, Mathias created five portraits of Welsh women for an exhibition at the Senedd building in Cardiff.
