= Llanfalteg Halt railway station =

Disused railway station in Llanfallteg, Carmarthenshire

Llanfallteg Halt

General information
- Location: Llanfallteg, Carmarthenshire; Wales
- Coordinates: 51.8472°N 4.6785°W
- Grid reference: SN156199
- Platforms: 1

Other information
- Status: Disused

History
- Original company: Whitland and Taf Vale Railway
- Pre-grouping: Whitland and Cardigan Railway
- Post-grouping: Great Western Railway; British Railways (Western Region)

Key dates
- 12 July 1875: Opened as Llanfalteg
- September 1956: Name changed to Llanfalteg Halt
- 10 September 1962: Closed
Location

Llanfalteg Halt railway station served the village of Llanfallteg, Carmarthenshire, Wales, from 1875 to 1962 on the Whitland and Cardigan Railway.

== History ==
The station was opened on 12 July 1875 by the Whitland and Taf Vale Railway. The original station had a wooden shed as a station building. Nearby was a stone-built engine shed which had space for one engine. This closed on 1 September 1886. A new station was built in 1886. This had a goods shed opposite the platform; access was granted by a ground frame in a wooden cabin. Near the level crossing was a siding that served another goods shed built from cast iron. On the platform was a station building that incorporated the waiting room and the booking shed. The station was downgraded to a halt in September 1956, thus the suffix 'Halt' was added to its name. It closed on 10 September 1962. The station building was demolished in 1968.

Preceding station	Disused railways	Following station
Login Halt; Line and station closed	Whitland and Cardigan Railway	Whitland; Line closed station open
