= Highmead =

Village in Ceredigion, Wales

Coordinates: 52.066352°N 4.186615°W

- Location within Ceredigion
- OS grid reference: SN 5021 4314
  - Cardiff: 59.2 mi (95.3 km)
  - London: 177.7 mi (286.0 km)
- Community: Llanwenog
- Principal area: Ceredigion
- Country: Wales
- Sovereign state: United Kingdom
- Post town: Llanybydder
- Postcode district: SA40
- Police: Dyfed-Powys
- Fire: Mid and West Wales
- Ambulance: Welsh
- UK Parliament: Ceredigion Preseli
- Senedd Cymru – Welsh Parliament: Ceredigion

Highmead is a small village in the community of Llanwenog, Ceredigion, Wales, which is 59.2 miles (95.3 km) from Cardiff and 177.7 miles (286 km) from London. Highmead is represented in the Senedd by Elin Jones (Plaid Cymru) and is part of the Ceredigion Preseli constituency in the House of Commons. Highmead also has an abandoned old school building described as frozen in time, called Highmead School.

== See also ==
- List of localities in Wales by population
