= Welsh Chess Union =

Governing body of chess in Wales

- Undeb Gwyddbwyll Cymru (Welsh)
- Sport: Chess
- Jurisdiction: Wales
- Founded: 19 June 1954; 72 years ago
- Replaced: British Chess Federation (in Wales)

Official website
- www.welshchessunion.uk

The Welsh Chess Union (Welsh: Undeb Gwyddbwyll Cymru) is the national chess federation for Wales. Formed on 19 June 1954 as a union of associations in South Wales and Monmouthshire, it was originally part of the British Chess Federation (BCF). The Union established the Welsh Championship in 1955. On 15 November 1969 it withdrew from the BCF to apply for membership in the World Chess Federation (FIDE) as an independent body. FIDE accepted the application at the Siegen Congress in 1970, and Wales competed in its first Olympiad at Skopje 1972, finishing 43rd of 62.

The federation comprises four county associations or "zones", them being: Dyfed, East Glamorgan, Gwent, and West Wales.

Its objects are to promote, organise and regulate the playing of competitive chess throughout Wales. Its motto is "Ymosodiad Dewr; Amddiffyniad Sicr" — "Bold in Attack; In Defence Secure".

The President of the Union from 2014–present is Bill Harle, and the Executive Director is Mark Adams.

== History ==
The WCU was created on 19 June 1954 as a coordinating body for regional associations in southern Wales and Monmouthshire. It ran the first Welsh Championship the following year. After operating within the BCF for fifteen years, the WCU pursued independent FIDE membership in 1969; this was approved at the 1970 Siegen Congress, enabling Wales to field its own national teams in international competition, including the Chess Olympiad starting in 1972.

== Organisation and structure ==
The federation is organised through its zonal (county) associations, which administer local leagues and events and nominate delegates to WCU governance. It also appoints arbiters, maintains national rating lists, and sets regulations for domestic competitions.

== Tournaments and championships ==
The flagship national event is the annual Welsh Championship (established 1955). The WCU also oversees national team competitions, junior championships, congresses and league play across its zones.

== Junior and community chess ==
The Union supports school and junior chess activity across Wales, including local festivals and countywide events. In 2024, a Pembrokeshire tournament hosted at Redhill Prep School in Haverfordwest drew 40 participants from 19 schools; the event was supported by WCU arbiter Ian Eustis and FIDE Master Alexis Harakis among others. In North Wales, community outreach has included visits by patrons and local exhibitions such as Lord Mostyn’s engagement with Flint pupils in 2018.

== Digital initiatives and partnerships ==
In 2025 the WCU announced a partnership with Esports Wales to include chess in the Welsh Esports League Season 9, with online tournament play hosted primarily on chess.com (Lichess as backup), a 10+5 time control, and Armageddon tiebreaks, alongside assignment of entrants to Esports Wales member clubs.

== Leadership ==
- President: Bill Harle (2014–present)
- Executive Director: Mark Adams

== See also ==
- Chess in the United Kingdom
