= Cwmsychbant =

Village in Ceredigion, Wales

Coordinates: 52.092368°N 4.22414°W

- Location within Ceredigion
- OS grid reference: SN 4773 4611
  - Cardiff: 61.6 mi (99.1 km)
  - London: 179.6 mi (289.0 km)
- Community: Llanwenog
- Principal area: Ceredigion
- Country: Wales
- Sovereign state: United Kingdom
- Post town: Llanybydder
- Postcode district: SA40
- Police: Dyfed-Powys
- Fire: Mid and West Wales
- Ambulance: Welsh
- UK Parliament: Ceredigion Preseli
- Senedd Cymru – Welsh Parliament: Ceredigion

Cwmsychbant is a small village in the community of Llanwenog, Ceredigion, Wales, on the A475 road. Cwmsychbant is represented in the Senedd by Elin Jones (Plaid Cymru) and the Member of Parliament is Ben Lake (Plaid Cymru).

== Unitarian chapel ==
The Capel-y-Cwm Unitarian chapel was built in 1906. Coflein, the online database of the Royal Commission on the Ancient and Historical Monuments of Wales, describes it as being in the "simple round-headed style of the gable entry type". The gable front is painted stucco. It was the last Unitarian chapel to be built in South Wales to fill a need for the congregation who had previously been meeting in a storeroom above a shop. The chapel is in a rural setting and has a cemetery beside it. The interior of the chapel has a small gallery at the back, and there are two attached halls in which functions can take place and where the Sunday School can meet.

== Notable people ==
Evan James Williams FRS (1903–1945), physicist, was born, died and buried in Cwmsychbant. His house is marked by a plaque erected by the Institute of Physics.
