= European Institute of Human Sciences =

European Institute of Human Sciences (IESH; French: Institut européen des sciences humaines) is a private organization specialized in teaching Islamic theology and the Arabic language.

The first establishment was created in 1990 near Château-Chinon, at the initiative of the Union of Islamic Organisations of France (UOIF, later Muslims of France). Other institutes followed in France and Europe.

The IESH of Château-Chinon was for a long time an interlocutor of the French public authorities, which wished to encourage the creation of a national training stream for imams in France.

The founding association was accused of antisemitism and of being a vector of violent radicalization. It was dissolved by a decree of the Council of Ministers in September 2025 and announced that it would appeal to the Council of State.

In November 2026, Egypt designated the European Institute of Human Sciences, including its various branches, as a terrorist organization.

== IESH of Château-Chinon ==
The IESH institutes in Europe in 2025.

In 1992, the IESH of Château-Chinon was the first to open, in Saint-Léger-de-Fougeret (Nièvre), with the support of François Mitterrand, President of the Republic. Other institutes were opened in France and Europe, some of which were inactive by 2025. The co-founders of the first institute were members of the UOIF and the institutes are part of the Muslim Brotherhood movement in Europe. In France, the IESH of Château-Chinon was one of the oldest imam training centres. Unlike other French training centres, it was not attached to a single foreign nationality and was long an interlocutor of the public authorities.

=== Studies and activities ===
It was the first institute for the training of imams and religious leaders opened in Europe, created in 1990 at the initiative of the UOIF and the Union of Islamic Organisations in Europe, in the municipality of Saint-Léger-de-Fougeret (Nièvre), with the aim of palliating the shortage of imams and training made in France religious leaders capable of understanding the specificities of secular society.

The study of the Quran and its exegesis is conducted in Arabic.

In 2012, the number of students was around 200. In 2014, the institute had trained 200 imams since its creation and had 220 students, mostly French.

=== Financing ===
According to Christophe Deloire and Christophe Dubois, the IESH of Saint-Léger-de-Fougeret was financed from its inauguration in 1992 by the "global fundamentalist elite". In 2003, the IESH of Château-Chinon, along with those in Wales and Paris, was one of the three main beneficiaries of the Europe Trust. In 2007, according to Antoine Peillon, the Emirate of Kuwait, Qatar and the Muslim Brotherhood financed the structures via the Swiss bank UBS. In 2012, according to the AFP, the institute's resources depended heavily on tuition fees.

=== Islamism ===
In 1993, the Islamist movement Ennahdha gave a conference at the Château-Chinon institute.In 1994, Fayçal Mawlawi was banned from entering French territory. In 1997, the first diploma ceremony was sponsored by Yusuf al-Qaradawi.

Fiammetta Venner wrote that the institute mainly produced "integrist militants".

=== Muslim Brotherhood ===
The financial manager stated that the IESH had no organic links with the Muslim Brotherhood.However, according to Brigitte Maréchal, the confrery contributed to the creation of the IESH.

=== Audit ===
In early 2016, the mayor of Autun requested a precise audit. The State replied that no element justified the closure of the IESH.

== Dissolution procedure ==
After the closure of the summer camp in 2024 and a search in December 2024, the government froze the institute's assets in June 2025. On 17 June 2025, a search revealed teaching materials describing Jews as "apes and pigs", the inferiority of women and justifying marital rape.

On 3 September 2025, the association was dissolved by decree. The association filed a claim with the Council of State for cancellation of this decree and received the support of Muslims of France.

== Other IESH ==
=== IESH of Paris ===
Located in Saint-Denis (93200), it opened in 2001. In 2012 it had 1,700 students. Unlike the Château-Chinon site, it offered a short curriculum in French in addition to the Arabic one.It was temporarily closed by administrative order in 2019. In July 2020, Le Parisien reported that it was under investigation. In March 2024, its dean Ahmed Jaballah left France for Tunisia.

=== IESH of Alsace ===
Created in 2018 in Strasbourg, it was no longer active in 2025.

=== In the United Kingdom, Germany and Finland ===
- United Kingdom
  - IESH Birmingham
  - IESH Wales (founded 1998 in Llanybydder; lost academic accreditation in 2005; closed after MI5 investigation linked to the murder of Lee Rigby).
- Germany
  - IESH Frankfurt (Europäisches Institut für Humanwissenschaften – EIHW), opened in 2013.
- Finland
  - IESH Helsinki, opened in 2016.

In 2025, the institutes in the UK were no longer active.

== See also ==
- Muslims of France
- Federation of Islamic Organisations in Europe
