= Thomas Benjamin (poet) =

Welsh non-conformist minister and poet (1850–1925)

The Reverend Thomas “Cynfelyn” Benjamin
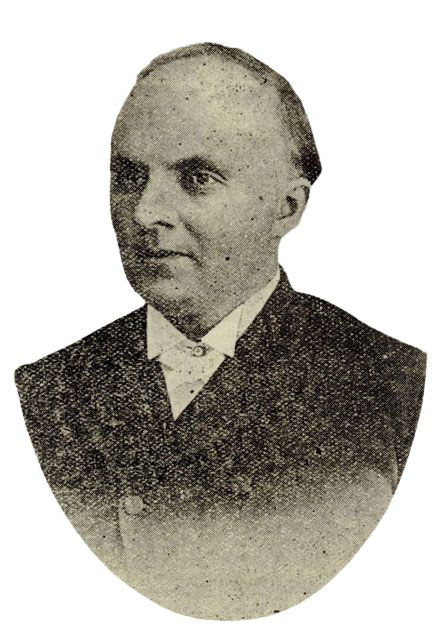
- Thomas Cynfelyn Benjamin, 1890s
- Born: April 7, 1850; Carno Hill, Rhymney, Monmouthshire, Wales
- Died: 19 March 1925; Llwynypia, Rhondda Valley, Wales
- Other names: Cynfelyn; Creiglyn; Gyfarllwyd
- Occupations: Congregational minister, poet
- Spouses: Jane Harris (m. 1869; died 1876); Miriam Jones (m. 1880; died 1917)
- Children: 3

Thomas Benjamin (7 April 1850 – 19 March 1925), known by his bardic name Cynfelyn, was a Welsh poet and congregational minister who gained prominence in Wales and America for his contributions to Welsh-language poetry and his achievements as an eisteddfod performer. His surviving papers are held at the National Library of Wales.

== Early life and education ==
Benjamin was born at Carno Hill, Rhymney, Monmouthshire. His mother died shortly after his birth, and he was subsequently raised at Tanrallt, Pen-llwyn, near Aberystwyth, by his maternal aunt Ann Benjamin (later Ann Jones). He was brought up with Ann’s son, Isaac Bonsall, to whom he remained close throughout his life.

He attended the village school at Pen-llwyn, where one of his teachers was the future Celtic scholar Sir John Rhŷs. By the mid-1860s, Benjamin had developed a strong interest in Welsh literature and began writing verse and competing in minor local eisteddfods. His early work reflects the religious and cultural influences of rural Cardiganshire.

== Bardic name ==
In keeping with Welsh tradition, Benjamin adopted a bardic name early in his career. He chose Cynfelyn, a Welsh version of Cymbeline, and used it consistently in published poetry and at eisteddfods. However, very occasionally, he wrote under the alternative pseudonyms Creiglyn and Gyfarllwyd.

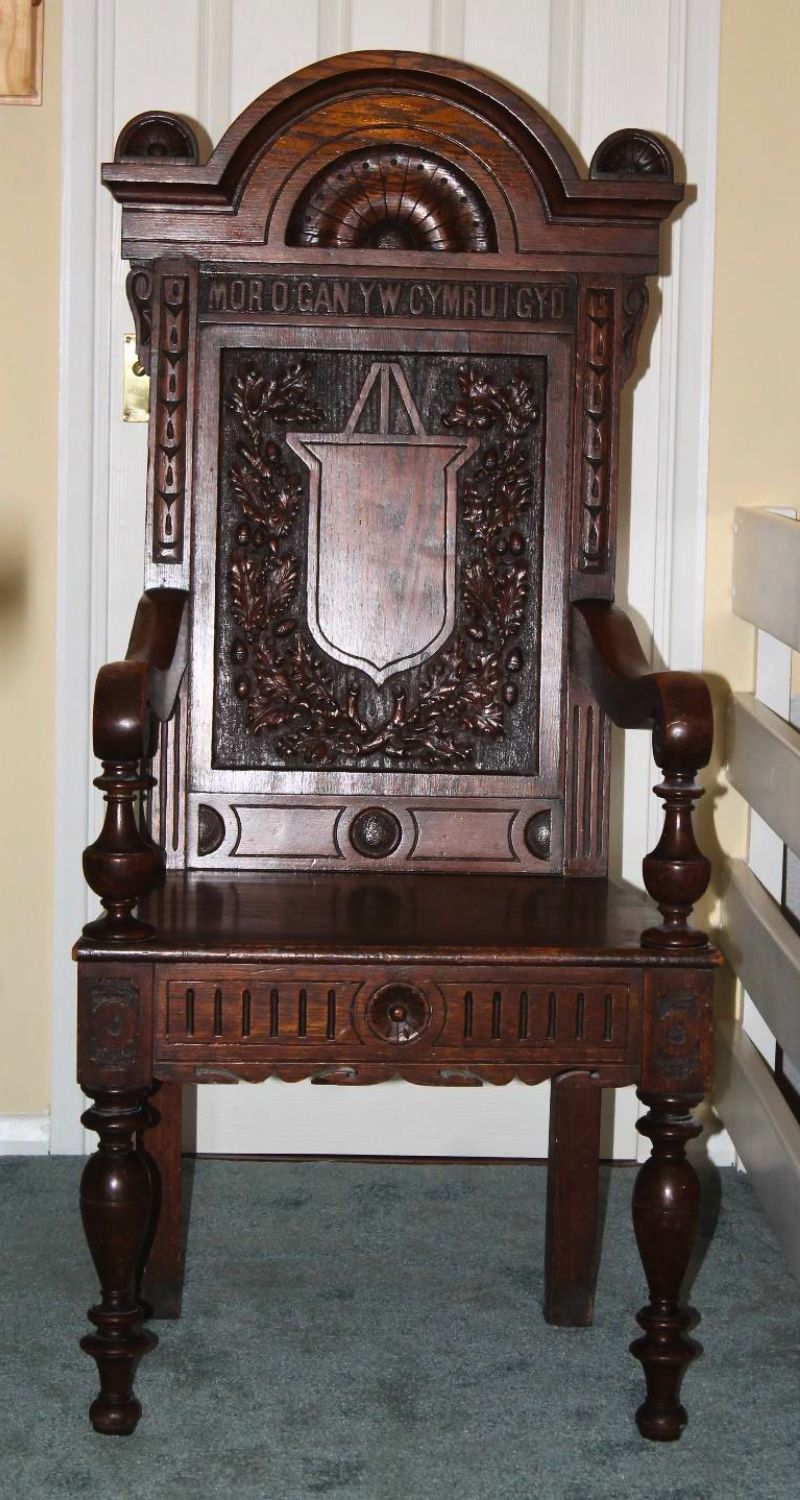
Bardic chair won by Cynfelyn (date unknown).

Although he was still officially Thomas for legal and official matters, he increasingly adopted Cynfelyn in general usage, not solely when writing and performing. As a result, by his late 20s, he was more often called and addressed by that name. When writing, his first name was usually shortened to "T".

== Early employment ==
Despite his abilities, the family circumstances prevented him from continuing his education beyond the village school. Instead, like many young men from Mid and North Wales, he moved south to work in the thriving coal and iron industries of the South Wales Valleys, initially finding work as an iron miner at Sirhowy, near Tredegar.

== Marriages and children ==
On 28 October 1869, he married Jane Harris; the couple had three children: Margaret Ann (1870-), Sarah Jane (1872-1944), and Evan (1876-1876). In 1876, Jane and the infant Evan died within days of each other. As a working man, raising two young children singlehandedly was nearly impossible, and his daughters were sent to be raised separately by extended family members in Gilfach Goch and Pen-llwyn.

During the 1870s, Benjamin was increasingly active in the cultural life of Gilfach Goch, with a growing reputation as a satirical poet and a powerful eisteddfod competitor.

During a brief visit to Pen-llwyn in 1880, he re-established his acquaintance with Miriam Jones, daughter of the local miller. They were married in Aberystwyth on 19 June 1880.

== Emigration to America ==
In 1881, Benjamin emigrated to America, settling initially in Hyde Park, Scranton, Pennsylvania. At this time, Pennsylvania was attracting an increasing number of Welsh people, where their mining skills were in high demand in the coalfields.

Although Benjamin had mainly earned his living underground in Wales, the exact nature of his early work in Pennsylvania remain unknown. However, he was a talented and engaging speaker, and many contemporary newspapers include advertisements for and reports on his lectures on religious and moral topics. Additionally, his poetry was published in Welsh-language newspapers, including Y Drych.

In 1882 at Hyde Park, he shared the stage with Watcyn Wyn, one of the most renowned Welsh poets of his generation, who was touring America.

Miriam, who had initially remained in Wales, joined her husband once he was established in Hyde Park.

== Ministerial career ==
Due to a shortage of ministers among the Welsh community, Benjamin started preaching in 1883 at the Welsh Congregational Church in Taylorville and was ordained the following year as the minister of a small Congregational chapel in Brisbin. After two years, he became the first minister of Moriah Congregational Church in Nanticoke, where the congregation experienced substantial growth during his tenure. In 1891, he accepted an invitation to join the Welsh Congregational Chapel on Sidney Street, South Side, Pittsburgh. His ministry there lasted five years and was characterised by high attendance, his growing influence within the Welsh congregational community, and ongoing writing and performing among the Welsh-speaking population. However, despite his outward success in Pennsylvania, he increasingly missed Wales and eventually returned to his homeland permanently in 1896.

== Return to Wales ==
In January 1897, Benjamin was appointed minister of the Congregational chapel at Pisgah, near Talgarreg, Llandysul. He oversaw repairs and improvements to the chapel and vestry, built a Sunday school, and his preaching initially attracted strong attendance. However, by around 1900, tensions arose between Benjamin and some influential members of the congregation, partly due to his satirical writing, often aimed at what he saw as their hypocritical lives. In turn, a poem criticising Benjamin was published in a regional newspaper under a pseudonym in 1903, prompting the author to publicly retract it after Benjamin objected to its defamatory tone.

Despite division within his congregation, Benjamin continued to compete successfully in eisteddfodau, winning a chair at Aberystwyth in 1903 for Storm ar Draeth Aberystwyth and the crown at Aberffrwd in 1904.

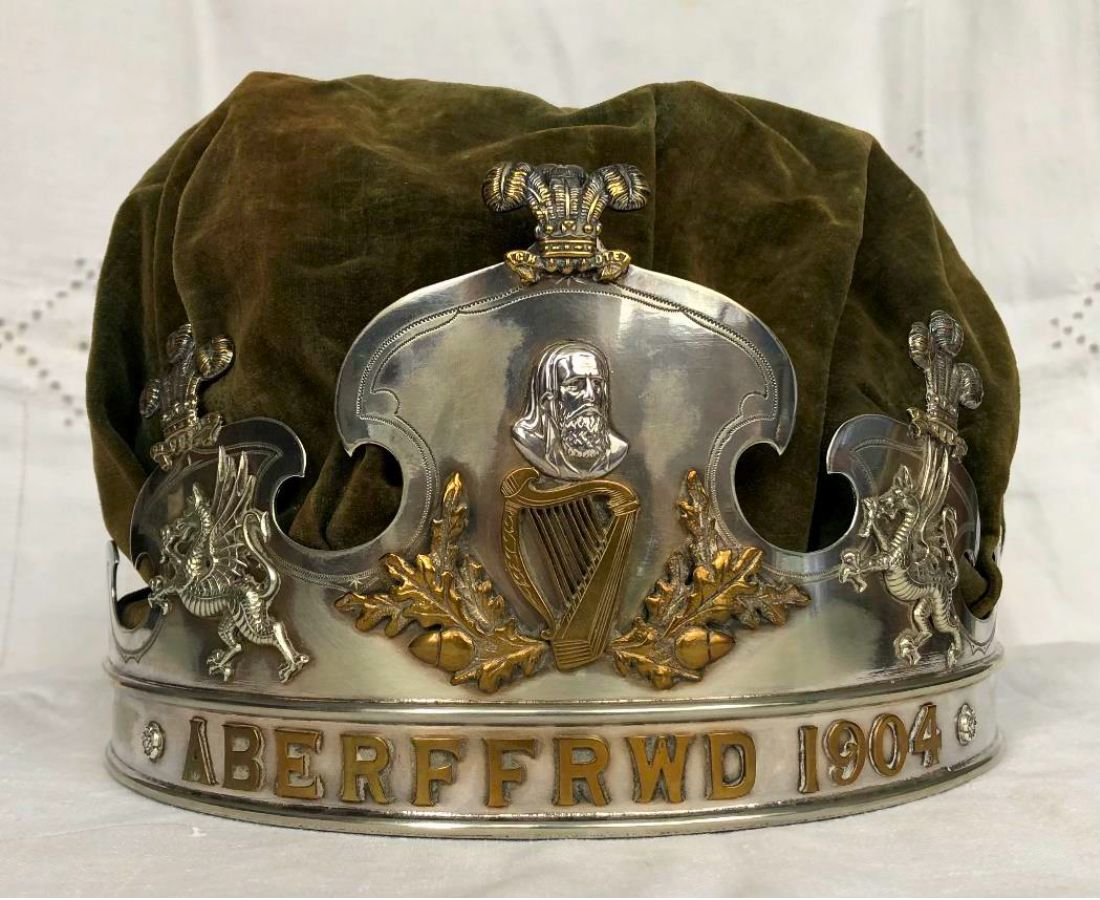
Bardic crown won by Cynfelyn at the Aberffrwd Eisteddfod in 1904.

He resigned from Pisgah in July 1905, citing ill health and persistent interpersonal difficulties.

== Later life and legacy ==
On leaving Pisgah, he and Miriam initially settled at Brynaraul, Rhydlewis, in a cottage owned by a sympathetic member of his former congregation. However, the cottage was very isolated, and likely because of Miriam’s declining health, they eventually relocated to Bwlchyrelmen in Ffostrasol. Although Benjamin did not hold another pastorate, he continued to write and privately publish poetry, occasionally lectured, and preached as a visiting minister. His papers, preserved at the National Library of Wales, include sermons, correspondence, booklets, and poetry manuscripts.

Benjamin’s work embodies key aspects of Welsh Nonconformity, the transatlantic Welsh experience, and the poetic styles of the Welsh language from the late nineteenth and early twentieth centuries. Scholars recognise that he left a dual legacy: he was both a prominent poet of the golden age of Welsh minister-poets and a sharp-tongued satirist whose strong personality often sparked controversy, particularly within Welsh congregationalism.

Miriam died in 1917, and he moved the following year to Penygraig in the Rhondda Valley to live with his younger daughter, Sarah Jane, and her family. Suffering from poor health for many years, he died at the former workhouse infirmary at Llwynypia on 19 March 1925.

On 25 September 1930, a headstone was unveiled on his previously unmarked grave, paid for by public subscription.

== Works ==
- Cronfa yr adroddwr: sef caniadau byrion (1896)
- "Cymru" sef, pryddest goronog Eisteddfod Eglwys Dewi Sant, Llundain (1900)
- Myfyrion yr hwyr (1902)
- Storm ar Draeth Aberystwyth (poem; 1903)
- Odlau'r awelon (1906)
- Pryddest goffadwriaethol ar ol y ddiweddar Mrs. Margaret Griffiths (1909)
- Cwyn coll ar ol y ddiweddar Mrs Ann Thomas, anwyl briod Mr William Thomas, Bwlchgwyn, Llanpumsaint, Sir Gaerfyrddin (1912)
- Tanchwa echrydus yng Nglofa yr Universal, Senghenydd (1913)
- Various poems, sermons and addresses (unpublished manuscripts; National Library of Wales)

A list of his booklets can be found in “A Bibliography of Cardiganshire” by Glyn Lewis Jones, 1967

== See also ==
- Congregationalism
- Eisteddfod
- Welsh-language literature
