= Ysgol Dyffryn Teifi =

Former school in Llandysul, Wales

Coordinates: 52.041°N 4.316°W

Ysgol Dyffryn Teifi was a bilingual (Welsh and English) comprehensive school in Llandysul, Ceredigion. It stood on the site of the previous Llandysul Grammar School. The school was established in 1984 following the re-organisation of education in the Teifi Valley. It was formerly a county school and grammar school dating back to the 19th century.

In 2001 there were 570 pupils at the school, the numbers then dropped, but had increased once more to 527 in 2007, and were expected to continue to gradually increase. 78 per cent of the pupils were from homes where Welsh was the main language spoken in 2001, this increased to 83 per cent in 2007, with 91 per cent of the pupils able to speak the language to first language standard.

Ysgol Dyffryn Teifi amalgamated with Aberbanc, Coed y Bryn, Pontsian and Llandysul primary schools in September 2016 to become Wales’ first purpose built combined primary and secondary Welsh-medium community school, Ysgol Bro Teifi.

== Notable alumni ==
Former Ysgol Dyffryn Teifi pupils of note include:

- Kay Swinburne, Conservative Member of the European Parliament for Wales
- Paul Davies, Conservative Member of the Welsh Assembly for Preseli Pembrokeshire
- T. Llew Jones, Welsh language children's books author
- Emyr Llewelyn, Welsh political activist
- Evan James Williams (1903–1945), physicist
- Evan Tom Davies (1904–1973), mathematician and linguist
- Sioned James (1974–2016)
- John Bowen Jones
- Aled Hall, Welsh classical tenor and opera artist.
- Cate le Bon, Musician and producer
