= Llanwenog =

Village and community in Ceredigion, Wales

- Location within Ceredigion
- Population: 1,364
- OS grid reference: SN 4936 4551
  - Cardiff: 60.5 mi (97.4 km)
  - London: 178.5 mi (287.3 km)
- Community: Llanwenog
- Principal area: Ceredigion
- Country: Wales
- Sovereign state: United Kingdom
- Post town: Llanybydder
- Postcode district: SA40
- Police: Dyfed-Powys
- Fire: Mid and West Wales
- Ambulance: Welsh
- UK Parliament: Ceredigion Preseli
- Senedd Cymru – Welsh Parliament: Ceredigion Penfro
- List of places UK Wales Ceredigion 52.087404°N 4.200097°W Community map: Map of the community

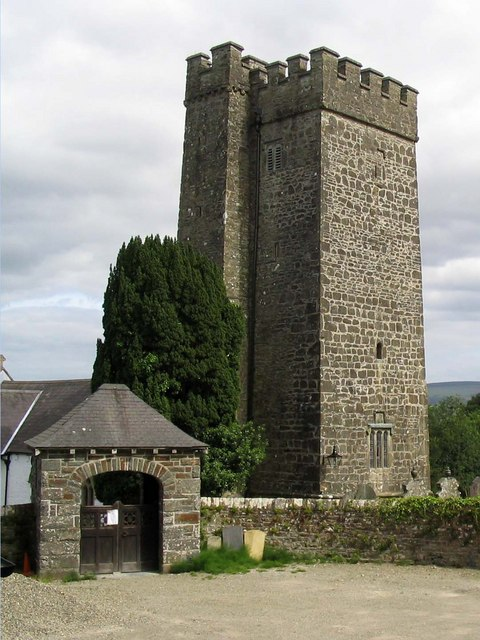
Llanwenog Church

Llanwenog is a village and community in Ceredigion, Wales. In 2011 the population of Llanwenog was 1,364, of whom 57.0% were able to speak Welsh. The community includes the villages of Alltyblacca, Gorsgoch, Cwmsychbant, Cwrtnewydd, Highmead, Aber, Drefach and Rhuddlan.

St Gwenog Church is a Grade I listed building. A Medieval structure, it is the only church dedicated to St Gwenog. The tower was added after 1485 for Rhys ap Thomas (died 1525) of Dinefwr and Carew.

The Llanwenog sheep is a breed of domestic sheep originating in Wales, which was developed in the 19th century.

== Governance ==
An electoral ward with the same name stretches beyond the confines of Llanwenog Community and had a total population at the 2011 census of 1,854.

== Notable people ==
- Evan James Williams (1903-1945), physicist, born in Cwmsychbant, attended Llanwenog Primary School.
