= Horeb, Carmarthenshire =

Hamlet in Carmarthenshire, Wales

Coordinates: 51.7294°N 4.1755°W

Horeb
- Location within Carmarthenshire
- OS grid reference: SN498056
- Community: Llanelli Rural
- Principal area: Carmarthenshire
- Preserved county: Dyfed
- Country: Wales
- Sovereign state: United Kingdom
- Post town: Llanelli
- Postcode district: SA15
- Dialling code: 01269 86
- Police: Dyfed-Powys
- Fire: Mid and West Wales
- Ambulance: Welsh
- UK Parliament: Llanelli
- Senedd Cymru – Welsh Parliament: Llanelli

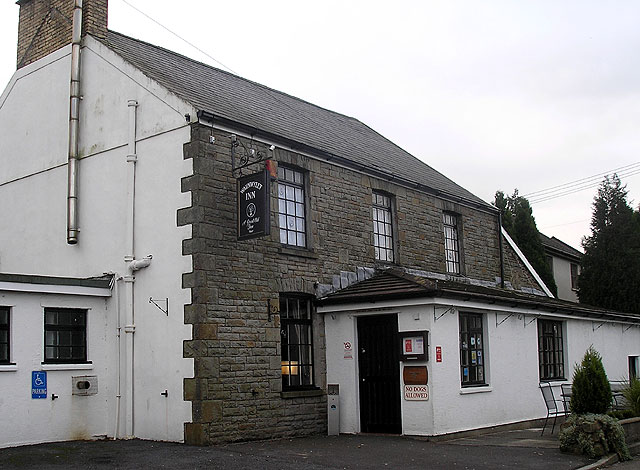
Waun Wyllt Inn, Horeb, Carmarthenshire

Horeb is a hamlet in Carmarthenshire, Wales, near the town of Llanelli. It is situated east of the village of Five Roads (Welsh: Pum Heol) about five miles from Llanelli. The hamlet has one pub, the Waun Wyllt. It is situated in the River Lliedi valley (Welsh: Cwm Lliedi), in which the river bearing the same name flows. Welsh is the dominant language.

Horeb was formerly known for brickmaking. The brickworks were founded in 1907 as the Blackthorn Brick Works, renamed as the Eclipse Brick Company in 1914, becoming the Horeb Brick Company in 1926. The brickworks closed in 1980. The listed remains of a 16-chamber Hoffman kiln, the only surviving example in Wales, can still be seen.
