= Rhydowen =

Village in Ceredigion, Wales

Coordinates: 52.085624°N 4.272652°W

Rhydowen: Welsh: Rhydowen
- Location within Ceredigion
- OS grid reference: SN444452
  - Cardiff: 90 mi (140 km)SE
- Community: Llandysul
- Principal area: Ceredigion
- Preserved county: Dyfed
- Country: Wales
- Sovereign state: United Kingdom
- Post town: LLANDYSUL
- Postcode district: SA44
- Dialling code: 01545
- Police: Dyfed-Powys
- Fire: Mid and West Wales
- Ambulance: Welsh
- UK Parliament: Ceredigion Preseli
- Senedd Cymru – Welsh Parliament: Ceredigion Penfro

Rhydowen is a small village in Ceredigion in south-west Wales.

It has a population of about 347, of which around 200 are Welsh-speaking.

The village hall, established in 1917, has been recently demolished, despite local protest. The hall, declared derelict in 1973 after falling into disrepair due to lack of use, or indeed maintenance, had undergone several attempts at restoration; but any future efforts were deemed too costly.

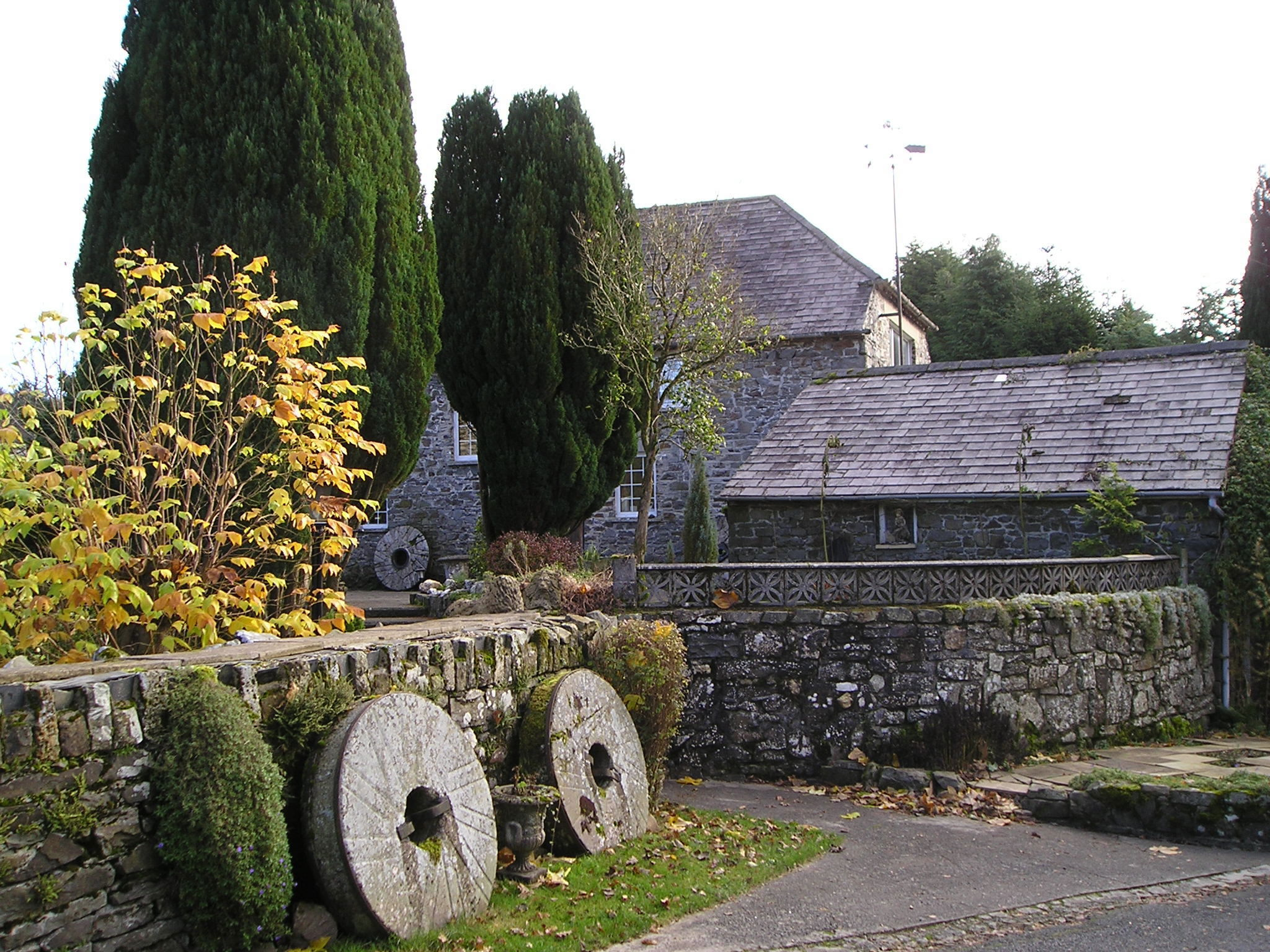
The old corn mill at Rhydowen, now a private dwelling house

| Preceding station | Historical railways | Following station |
|---|---|---|
| Login, Carmarthenshire via Llanglydwen | Great Western Railway; Whitland & Cardigan Railway | Llanfyrnach |
