= Drefach, Ceredigion =

Village in Ceredigion, Wales

Coordinates: 52.090568°N 4.188222°W

Dre-fach
- Location within Ceredigion
- OS grid reference: SN 5018 4584
  - Cardiff: 60.4 mi (97.2 km)
  - London: 178.1 mi (286.6 km)
- Community: Llanwenog
- Principal area: Ceredigion
- Country: Wales
- Sovereign state: United Kingdom
- Post town: Llanybydder
- Postcode district: SA40
- Dialling code: 01570
- Police: Dyfed-Powys
- Fire: Mid and West Wales
- Ambulance: Welsh
- UK Parliament: Ceredigion Preseli
- Senedd Cymru – Welsh Parliament: Ceredigion

Drefach is a small village in the community of Llanwenog, Ceredigion, Wales. Dre-fach is represented in the Senedd by Elin Jones (Plaid Cymru) and is part of the Ceredigion Preseli constituency in the House of Commons.
