= Llandysul =

Town in Ceredigion, Wales

- Town
- Location within Ceredigion
- Area: 1.029 km^{2} (0.397 sq mi)
- Population: 1,322 (2021)
  - Density: 1,285/km²
- OS grid reference: SN4162340646
- Community: Llandysul
- Principal area: Ceredigion
- Preserved county: Dyfed
- Country: Wales
- Sovereign state: United Kingdom
- Post town: LLANDYSUL
- Postcode district: SA44
- Dialling code: 01559
- Police: Dyfed-Powys
- Fire: Mid and West Wales
- Ambulance: Welsh
- UK Parliament: Ceredigion Preseli
- Senedd Cymru – Welsh Parliament: Ceredigion Penfro
- Website: https://www.llandysul-wales.co.uk/
- List of places UK Wales Ceredigion 52.04114°N 4.30949°W Community map: Map of the community

Llandysul, also spelt Llandyssul, is a town and community in the county of Ceredigion, Wales. As a community it consists of the townships of Capel Dewi, Horeb, Pontsian, Pren-gwyn, Tregroes, Rhydowen and the town of Llandysul itself. Llandysul lies in south Ceredigion in the valley of the River Teifi and is visited for its fishing and canoeing. The community had a population of 2732, as of 2011. The village itself has a population of 1484.

Llandysul is also known as the home of Gwasg Gomer, one of the most prominent publishers of Welsh-interest and Welsh language books in Wales. The town is twinned with Plogonnec (Plogoneg) in Brittany, France.

== Toponymy ==
The name of the town in Welsh is a combination of llan "church" and the mutated saint's name Tysul to mean "the church of St Tysul".

== History ==
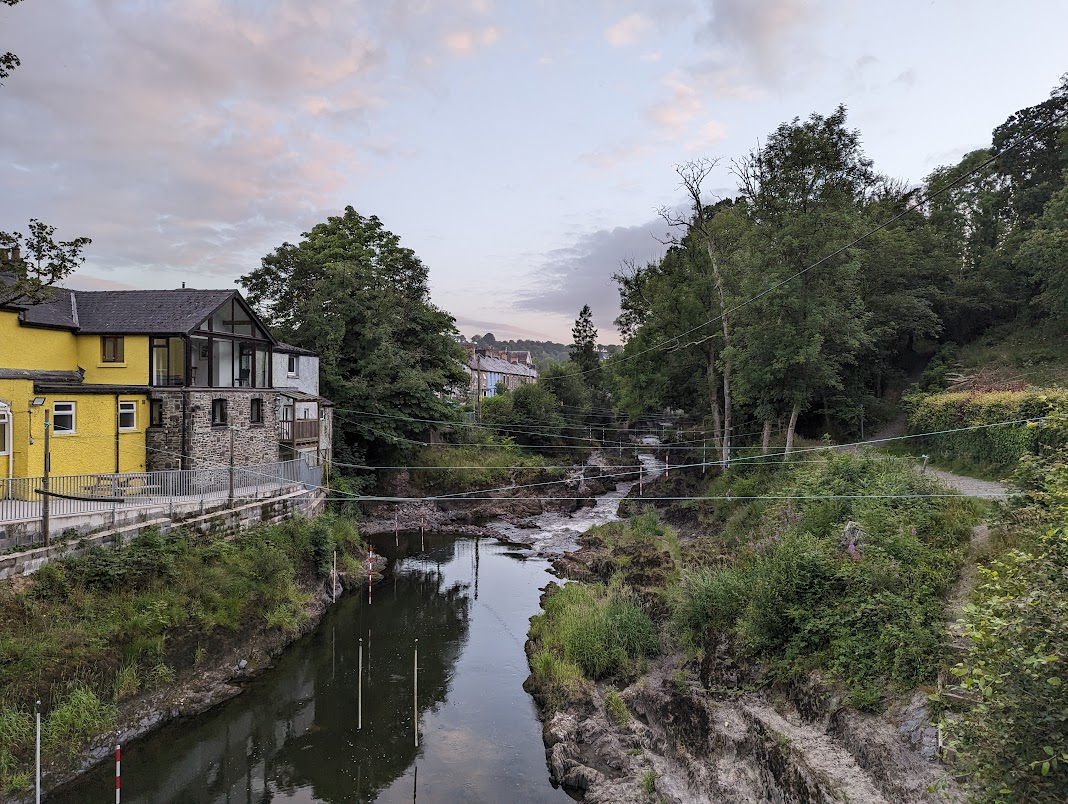
Llandysul River

Pencoedfoel is an Iron Age hillfort one mile northeast of Llandysul. An oval banked and ditched enclosure with double ramparts, about 160 by 128 metres (525 by 420 ft), is defined by degraded banks and scarps on the summit of an isolated hill. Two halves of a bronze collar were found near here, possibly dating to the late 1st century BC or early 1st century AD.

The oldest building in the town is the church which dates from the 13th century. It as built on the site of the original church from the 6th century. Saint Tysul was the grandson of Ceredig ap Cunedda (hence the name Ceredigion) and a cousin of St David. Fairs and markets were established by the Kings of England and the Edwardian marcher lords who captured these lands from the native rulers between the 12th and 14th centuries. Owain Glyndŵr is associated with the town. The men of Llandysul supported him in battle in 1400 and afterwards his lands around Llandysul were confiscated by Henry IV.

In 1644, during the English Civil War, the Royalist army was defending Ceredigion against the Parliamentary army. One of the three arches of the bridge at Llandysul was pulled down by the Royalists to prevent the Parliamentarians crossing into Ceredigion. The bridge was later rebuilt with a single arch.

The Teifi Valley around Llandysul was the home of the Welsh woollen industry. Many sheep were reared locally and there were plenty of fast-flowing streams to power machinery so many woollen mills were established in the area in the 19th century. There was also a flannel shirt factory in the town at that time. The mills had nearly all been closed by the end of the 20th century as cheaper textiles became available from the Far East.

The Gomer Press (Welsh: Gwasg Gomer) was founded by John David Lewis (1859–1914). He started by selling books from a corner of his father's grocery store before establishing the press in 1892. It is now a thriving printing company and the largest publishing house in Wales and moved to new premises just outside the town in 2004. It publishes titles for both adults and children, in English and in Welsh. The present managing director, Jonathan Lewis, is the great-grandson of the founder.

== Economy ==
There is little industry in Llandysul today. The woollen mills are closed and used for other purposes; one housed a confectionery distribution business which is now defunct, and the building currently lies empty. There was a fortnightly livestock market until 2008 when the site became part of the new Llandysul bypass. Tourism draws people into West Wales but Llandysul largely misses out from this source of income as it has no specific tourist attractions.

Llandysul was a railway station on the Newcastle Emlyn branch, opened in 1864 and closed to passengers in 1952.

Telynau Teifi Harps was a community business set up with help from Ceredigion County Council and the European Union in 2004 by harp-maker Allan Shiers. It was the only harp-making business in Wales, a country with a traditional association with the instrument. Celtic and folk harps were made here and the entire manufacturing process took place on the site. The business closed in 2022, with its empty building making national news in 2024 as the unexpected base of an illegal cannabis farm containing plants worth a reported £2 million. Shortly after the operation was shut down by the police, the building caught fire twice, causing major damage to the former primary school.

Llandysul Paddlers Canoe Centre was opened in October 1998. It holds courses and provides accommodation for up to 35 visitors. Canoeing brings in visitors who contribute to the local economy.

== Culture and community ==
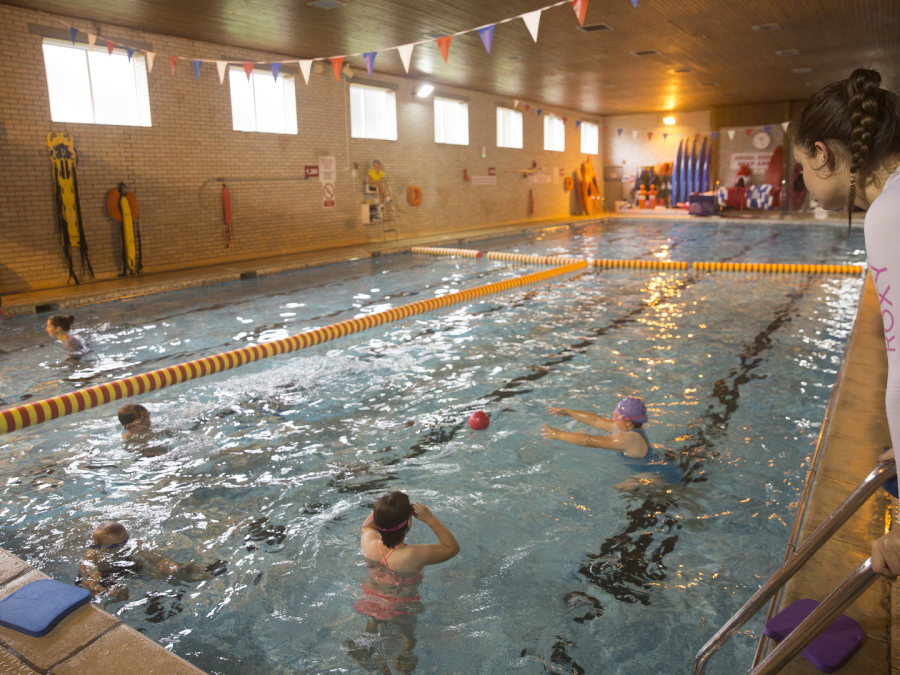
Children playing in the pool at Calon Tysul overseen by a lifeguard

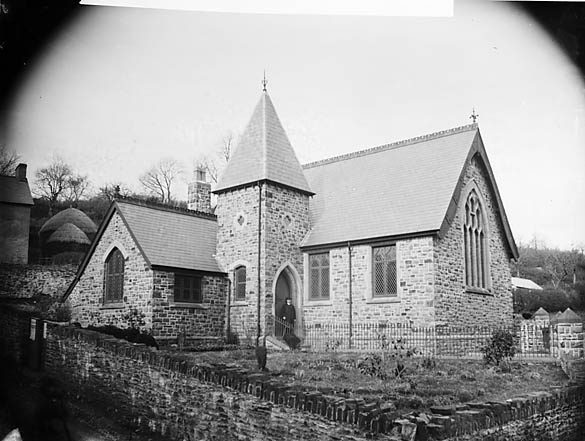
Capel y Graig, Llandysul, c. 1885

The Memorial Park is a recreation area in a loop of the River Teifi. There is a children's playground, a tennis club, a bowling club and sports pitches. Llandysul Cricket Club and Llandysul Football Club play here. The cricket club fields two sides in the South Wales Cricket Association (Division One and Division Six) and has a thriving youth section. The football club likewise fields two teams in Division One and Two of the Ceredigion League and were league champions in 2016–17 as well as winners of the J. Emrys Morgan Cup.

Tysul Hall was built in 1955 as a memorial to the men lost in two world wars. It can seat 400 people and events and meetings are held there.

Llandysul has a post office, two chemists, a range of other shops, a church, several chapels and a leisure centre with swimming pool. The last of four major banks in Llandysul closed in 2017.

Llandysul Angling Association owns the rights to over 30 miles of fishing on the River Teifi which is a river noted for its salmon, sea trout and trout.

Llandysul Paddlers is a nonprofit making association which works with young people from the community and across the whole of the UK. They deliver sessions on kayaking, whitewater rafting and canoeing; away from the water they deliver sessions about climbing and mountain biking and help local schools in their delivery of the DofE scheme.

The Powerhouse is a community and arts centre designed to host a variety of activities. It is housed in a historic building beside the River Teifi that originally generated power for the local community.

Llandysul and District Local History Society have an exhibition in the upstairs room of Llandysul Library.

Calon Tysul was founded in November 2017. The site is an amalgamation of two previously separate entities; Llandysul Aqua Centre and Llandysul Leisure Centre.

The site includes a 25 by 10 metres (82 ft × 33 ft) swimming pool, formerly known as Teifiside Swimming Pool. The pool was built with the help of town residents in 1975 and was later renamed Llandysul Aqua Centre following a restructure. The adjoining Llandysul Leisure Centre was built in 2003 by Ceredigion County Council. The council maintained and operated the centre from 2003 to 2017.

Following a community asset transfer in 2017, Llandysul Leisure Centre and the land beneath the swimming pool came into the ownership of the trustees of Calon Tysul. As well as the swimming pool, the building also includes a sports hall with space for four badminton courts, a multi-purpose room, fitness suite as well as wet and dry changing facilities.

A board of voluntary trustees is responsible for the governance of the centre. A wide variety of recreational and educational activities take place at the centre, such as swimming, kayaking, children's birthday parties, National Exercise Referral Scheme, fitness classes, gymnastics, badminton, table tennis, climbing, football and more. Several groups such as Llandysul Cubs and Beavers and Llandysul Crafters meet at the centre.

Elen, the mother of Owain Glyndwr, the last Welsh Prince of Wales, was celebrated in a large mural placed on the outer wall of Calon Tysul on September 18, 2023. She had been born in the area.

== Education ==
There were two schools in the town; Ysgol Dyffryn Teifi, a bilingual comprehensive school with over 500 pupils, and Ysgol Gynradd Llandysul, a bilingual primary school. Both were closed in 2016 due to the opening of a new super school Ysgol Bro Teifi.

Llandysul Paddlers also works as an education centre delivering sessions to young people and adults and has a number of full-time trained teachers working for them.

== Church ==
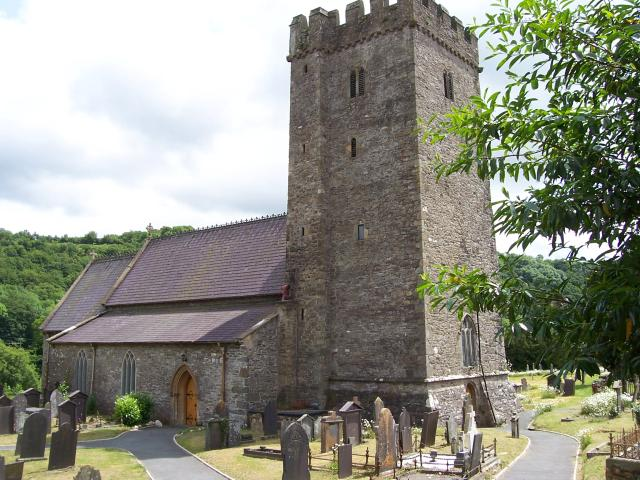
St Tysul's Church

The church of St Tysul was founded by Saint Tysul, 462–554, at the meeting place of a number of tracks at a ford over the River Teifi. The present stone structure dates from the 13th century and the roof remained thatched until 1783. The ancient altar with its early Christian inscription was incorporated into the altar of the Lady Chapel. The simple nave is separated from the north and south aisles by plain square pillars. Other ancient carved stones are found in the choir vestry. One of these is the Velvor Stone, a fragment cut from the middle of an inscribed slab.

The tower houses a ring of six bells which are rung regularly.

On Calan Hen ("Old New Year's Day", now 12 January), it was the custom for harvest workers to be given a feast. The rest of the day was spent playing the ancient game of Cnapan. Kickoff was halfway between the two goals, the porch of Llandysul Church and the porch of St Gwenog's Church, Llanwenog. Most of the players were drunk by this time and it was a rough affair. In 1833, the vicar of Llandysul, Reverend Enoch James, substituted a different way of celebrating Calan Hen. It was a gathering in Llandysul Church of the Sunday Schools of the churches within eight miles of Llandysul to answer catechisms, sing anthems and recite scriptures. The custom continues to this day.

Rev. Gareth Reid was appointed priest-in-charge of St Tysul's Church (and other churches in the benefice) in June 2013. In October 2014, lightning struck the church tower causing damage to the crenellations in the northeast corner, resulting in chunks of masonry falling on the roof below. The church and graveyard were fenced off for safety reasons until repairs to the church and tower could be completed. The church was reopened six months later.

== Notable people ==
- Saint Gelert (7th C.) a hermit who lived in a cave near the Holy Well of St Celer near Llandysul.
- Christmas Evans (1766–1838), preacher
- David Bevan Jones (1807 in Gellifaharen – 1863), bardic name Dewi Elfed, a Welsh Baptist minister
- Jenkin Lloyd Jones (1843–1918), a famous American Unitarian preacher.
- John Park Davies (1897–1937), Unitarian minister and educator.
- Evan James Williams (1903–45), experimental physicist on sub-atomic particles, born in Cwmsychbant, attended Llandysul school.
- Hywel Davies (1919–1965), a Welsh radio broadcaster, TV interviewer and writer.
- Roy Evans (born 1942), a Welsh civil engineer and academic.
- Iolo Ceredig Jones (1947–2021), a Welsh former international chess player born in Llandysul.
- Menna Elfyn (born 1952), poet, playwright, columnist and editor; lives in Llandysul.
- Sioned James (1974–2016), a Welsh musician and conductor, founded a successful Cardiff-based choir
- Fflur Dafydd (born 1978), a Welsh novelist, singer-songwriter and musician.
- Steffan Lloyd (born 1998), para-cyclist.
