= Woollen industry in Wales =

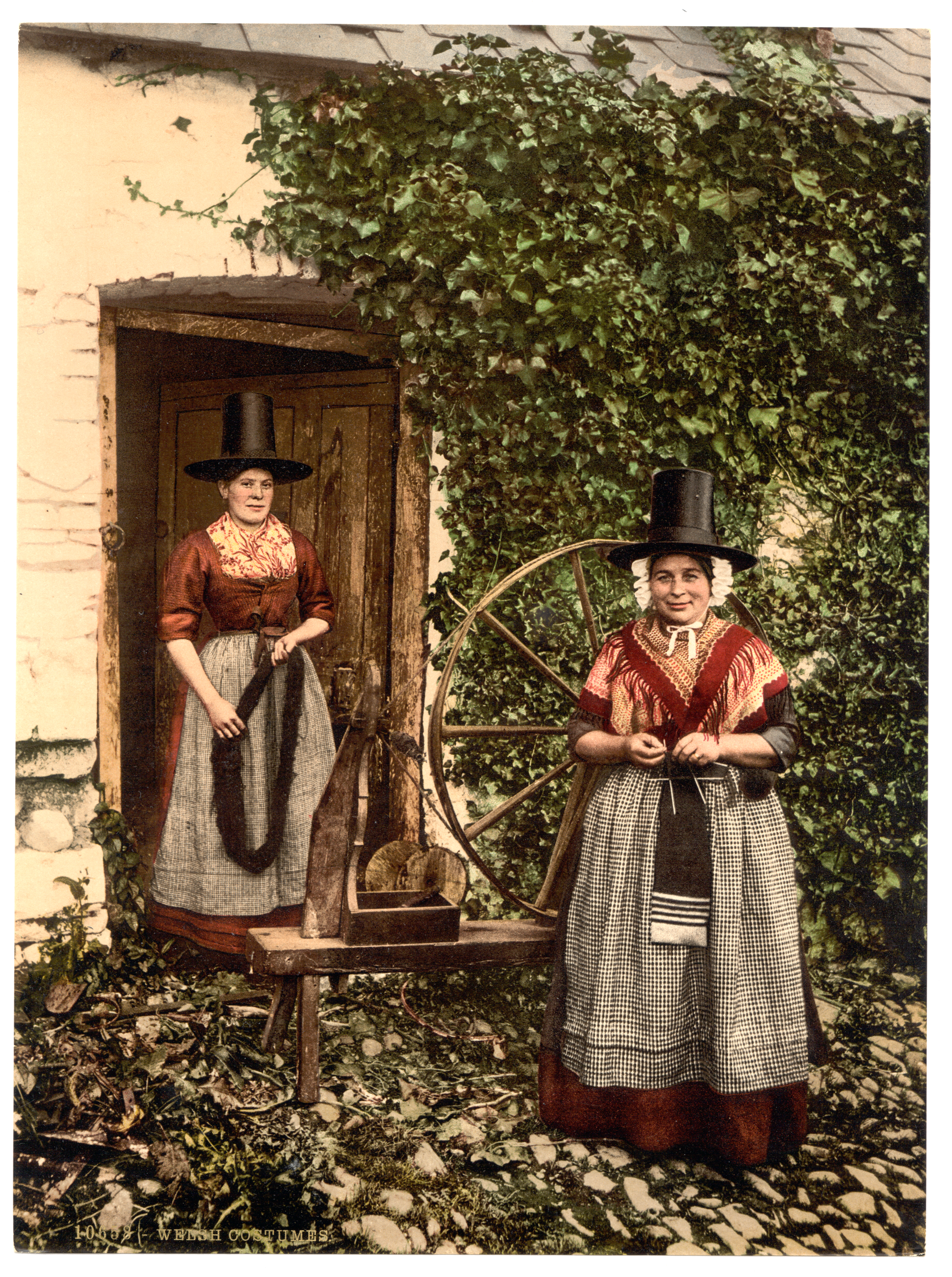
Welsh spinners in traditional costume, c. 1895

The woollen industry in Wales was at times the country's most important industry, though it often struggled to compete with the better-funded woollen mills in the north of England, and almost disappeared during the 20th century. There is continued demand for quality Welsh woollen products.

Wool processing includes removing the fleece by shearing, classing the wool by quality, untangling, carding and spinning it into yarn, which may be knitted or woven into cloth, then finishing the cloth by fulling, napping and pressing. Spinning and weaving of sheep's wool dates to prehistoric times in Wales, but only became an important industry when Cistercian monasteries were established in the 12th century. Water-powered fulling mills to finish the cloth enabled rapid expansion of the industry in the 13th century, although spinning and weaving continued to be a cottage industry. In the early 16th century, production shifted from south Wales to mid and north Wales. The Shrewsbury Drapers Company in England took a dominant role in distributing Welsh cloth. In the 18th century, there was strong demand for cheap and sturdy Welsh material shipped from Bristol, Liverpool, or the Welsh ports to clothe slaves in the British colonies in the Americas.

During the Industrial Revolution in Wales, the Welsh woollen industry was slow to mechanise compared to the mills of northern England. When railways reached mid Wales in the 1860s they brought a flood of cheap mass-produced products that destroyed the local industry. However, development of the South Wales Coalfield opened a growing market for woollen products from water-powered mills in the south west, which prospered until after World War I. At one time, there were more than 300 working wool mills. The industry went into steady decline after World War I, and only a few mills continue to operate today.

== Process ==
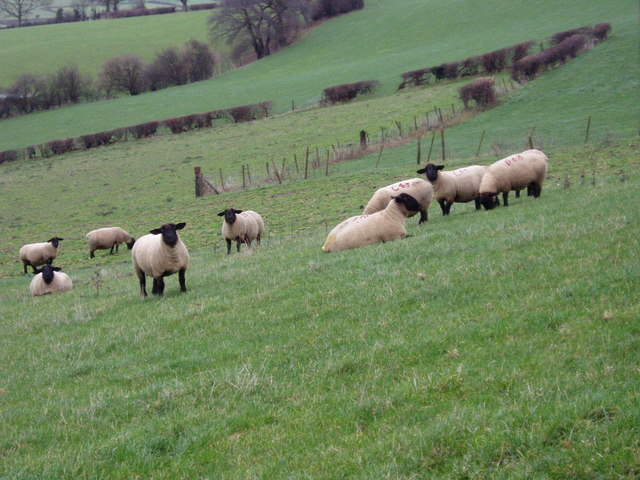
Black-faced sheep on western side of the Vale of Clwyd

Sheep shearing was a major social event on Welsh farms. The fleece would be removed intact, then carefully folded to make it easier to sort out the different grades of wool at the mill. The quality of wool depends on the individual sheep and on the part of the sheep's body from which the wool has been taken. The common Welsh Mountain sheep are hardy and thrive in the cold and wet conditions of the Welsh highlands. The wool is soft and may have kemp and black, grey or red fibres, which makes it attractive in tweeds and upholstery. Staple length is 5 to 15 centimetres (2.0 to 5.9 in). Black Welsh Mountain sheep had mutton that was prized for its quality, and produced valuable Cochddu wool with a staple length of 8 to 10 centimetres (3.1 to 3.9 in).

After sorting, the raw wool would often be soaked in a 50–50 solution of human urine and water, then passed through a willy to untangle it and remove foreign matter. Carding completed the disentangling process, creating rolls of wool called rovings. The fibres in the roving were then spun into woollen yarn. Spinning machines were introduced in the 19th century. The spun fibre would then be woven into cloth, which would be finished by washing and drying, fulling, napping and pressing. Natural dyes were used until the mid-19th century. The fleece could be "dyed-in-the-wool", the fibre could be dyed after being spun, or the fabric could be dyed after being woven.

== Prehistoric to early medieval times ==
Sheep farming in Wales dates to prehistoric times. There is evidence of spinning and weaving in late prehistoric houses throughout Britain, particularly in the later first millennium B.C.. Finds include scraps of fabric, loom-weights, spindle-whorls and bone needles, and the arrangement of post-holes may indicate they supported looms. For example, a Bronze Age weaving comb was found in the Ogof yr Esgyrn cave in Glyntawe. The Romans probably imported the white breed characteristic of Welsh sheep today. The sheep at this time would have been much more variable than modern breeds, which have been carefully selected for specific characteristics. In the early days the sheep were not shorn, but the wool was collected when the sheep moulted in the summer, either by plucking it from their fleece or collecting it where it had been rubbed off on a tree or rock.

Excavations have been made at the Dinas Powys hillfort in Glamorgan of what seems to have been the court of an important ruler in the 5th and 6th centuries A.D. The bones of sheep were found, but there seems to have been little spinning and weaving. The 6th century writer Gildas, thought by some to have lived in Wales, mentioned "mountains particularly suitable for the alternating pasturage of animals". This seems to refer to transhumance, or seasonal movement of shepherds with their flocks, and if so is the earliest mention in Britain. The 10th century Welsh laws of King Hywel Dda allocate pigs to the husband and sheep to the wife. In the summer the pigs were kept in the woods while the wife took the sheep and the children to the highlands. The wife also controlled the dairy, and took the milking and cheese making equipment. Divorce remained an option in Wales longer than elsewhere in Britain. It was assumed that the woman deserved a share of the lambs and calves.

== Medieval period ==
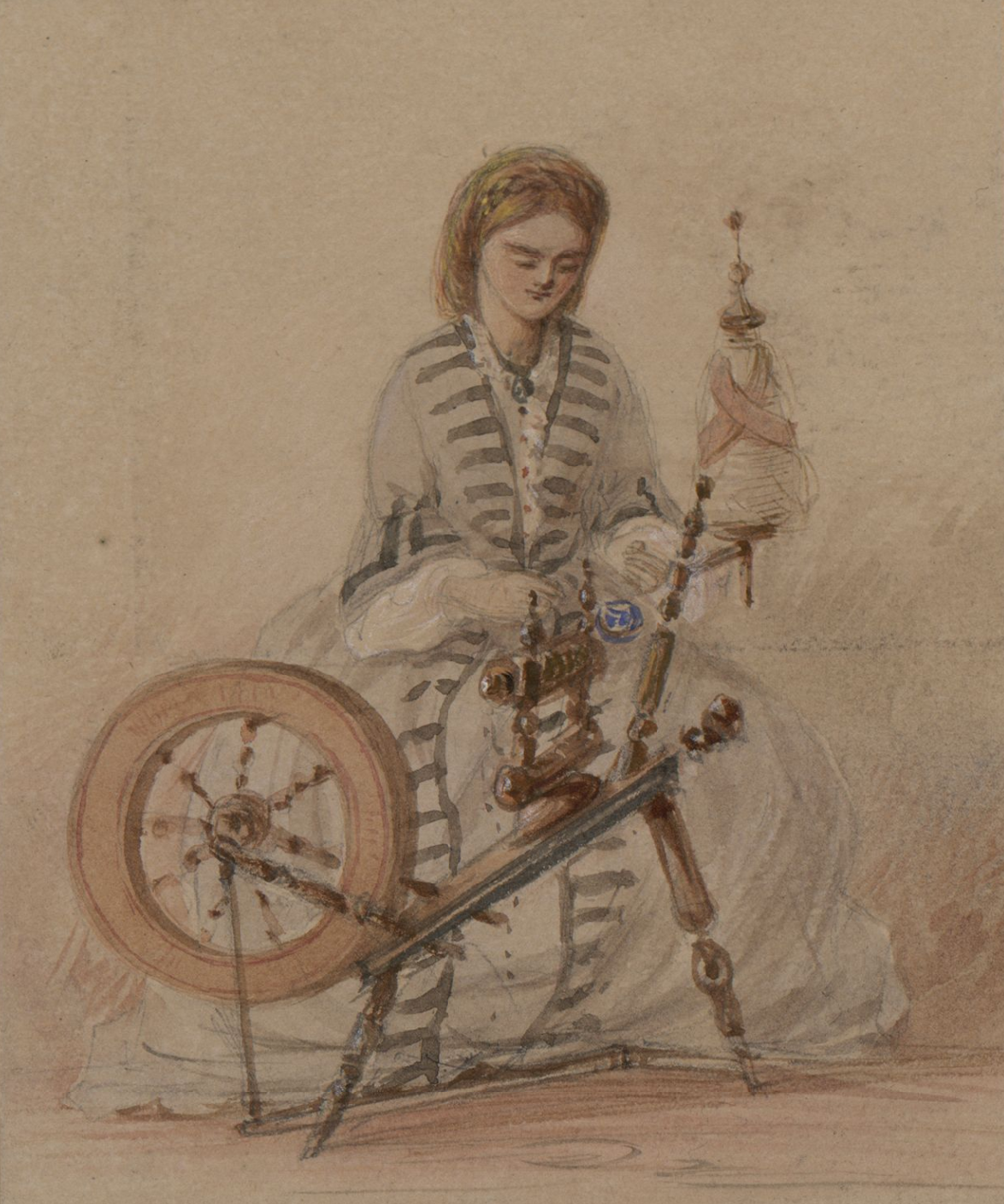
Portrait of a spinster by Frances Elizabeth Wynne

In the Middle Ages, sheep were probably kept mainly for their milk and wool rather than their meat. Sheep do not seem to have been important to the Welsh economy before the 12th century, when the first Cistercian monasteries were established in Wales. Tintern Abbey in the Wye valley was founded for monks of the Cistercian order by Walter FitzRichard, lord of Netherwent and Striguil, on 9 May 1131. All abbeys of the order were to be built in remote rural locations, and had to be simple and unadorned. The order expanded rapidly. Tintern was followed by Whitland (1140), its offshoot Strata Florida (1164), Strata Marcella (1170) in Powys Wenwynwyn, Cwmhir (1176) in Maelienydd, Llantarnam (1179) near Caerleon, Aberconwy (1186) in Gwynedd, Cymer (1198) in Merionethshire and Valle Crucis (1202) in Powys Fadog. The monks were granted extensive lands for sheep grazing and were the pioneers of the woollen industry in Wales.

The invention of the water-powered fulling mill in the Later Middle Ages caused an industrial revolution in Wales. In the century that preceded the Black Death, the monastic landowners and manorial lords built fulling mills in eastern Wales, with up to 80 operating before 1350. Sometimes a fulling mill and gristmill would share the same building or the same leat and mill pond. There would be a tenter yard outside the fulling mill where the cloth was stretched on frames. Woollen manufacturing became one of the main rural industries in Wales. Most Welsh cottages and farmhouses had a spinning wheel, almost always operated by women, and most parishes had carders, spinners, weavers and fullers. However, most of the production were for personal use rather than for sale.

The main centre of the new woollen industry was initially in south east Wales drawing on sheep from the monasteries of Margam, Neath and Tintern, and the flocks of the Bohun family, which produced 18,500 fleeces in 1372. Fulling mills were later established elsewhere in Wales, particularly in the north east and the Ceiriog valley. In 1380, the lordship of Ruthin in Denbighshire had 36 weavers. However, the period from 1350 to 1400 was difficult, with recurrences of the plague and heavy taxation to pay for the war with France. Between 1350 and 1500, an average of 50 fulling mills were operational. The reduced number was due to the unsettled state of the country before, during and after the Glyndŵr Rising (1400–15).

The quality of wool depended on the local breeds of sheep. In the 15th century, south-east Wales produced particularly high quality wool. Margam in West Glamorgan and Tintern in Monmouthshire were noted for their excellent wool. According to Thomas Fuller's Church History, Wales specialized in manufacturing friezes. A frieze is a coarse woollen cloth that usually has a nap on one side. It was hard-wearing and well-suited for outer garments, and was popular with working men. Cloth was made in many places in Wales, particularly the south west and the northern and southern borderlands. In 1447, there was a guild of weavers and fullers in the lordship of Ruthin, and in the 1460s, at least five fulling mills were operating in this location. The cloth was sold locally, in border town markets and in the yearly Bartholomew Fair in London. Welsh friezes were also exported from Welsh ports or from Bristol.

In the early 16th century, cloth for export was mainly produced in south Wales and shipped from the local ports. During that century there was a shift in production to mid-Wales and north Wales, and the woollen production was exported via Shrewsbury in Shropshire. The Shrewsbury Drapers Company tightly controlled the trade. The Welsh cloth makers, who lacked capital, produced poor quality drapery for which there was relatively low demand.

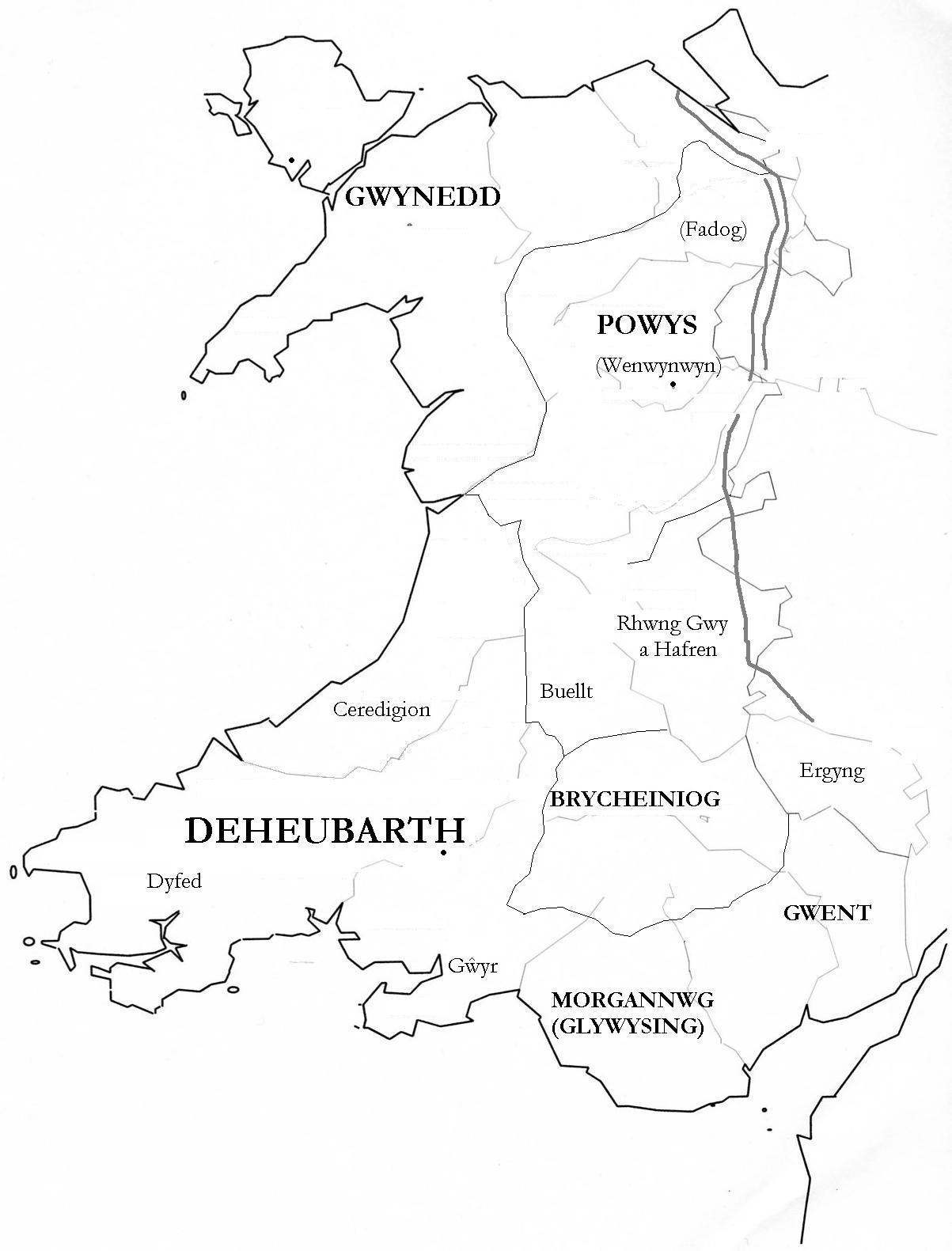
Medieval kingdoms of Wales

Early Cistercian abbeys and English towns

Historical counties

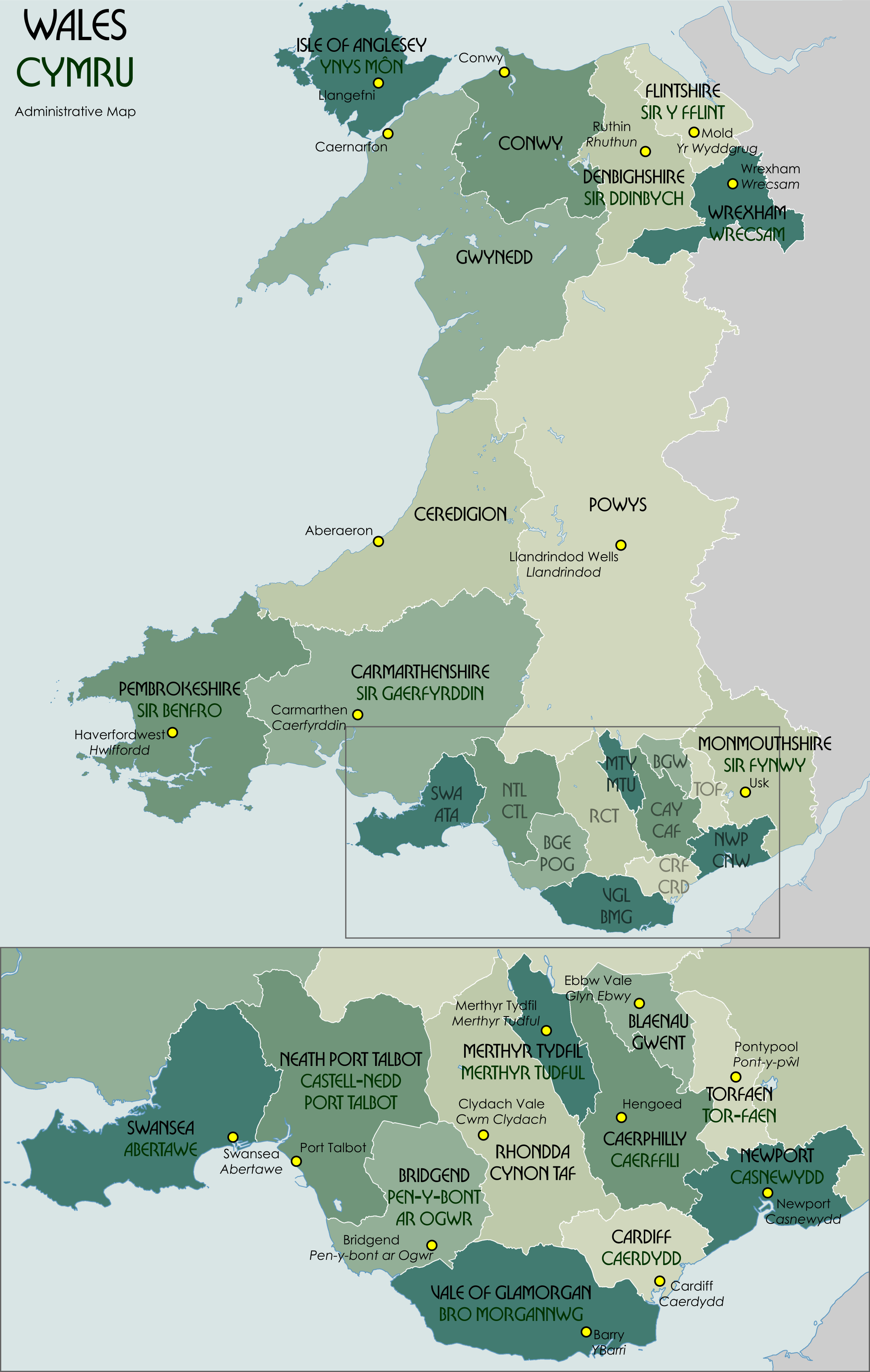
Modern divisions

== Foreign trade ==
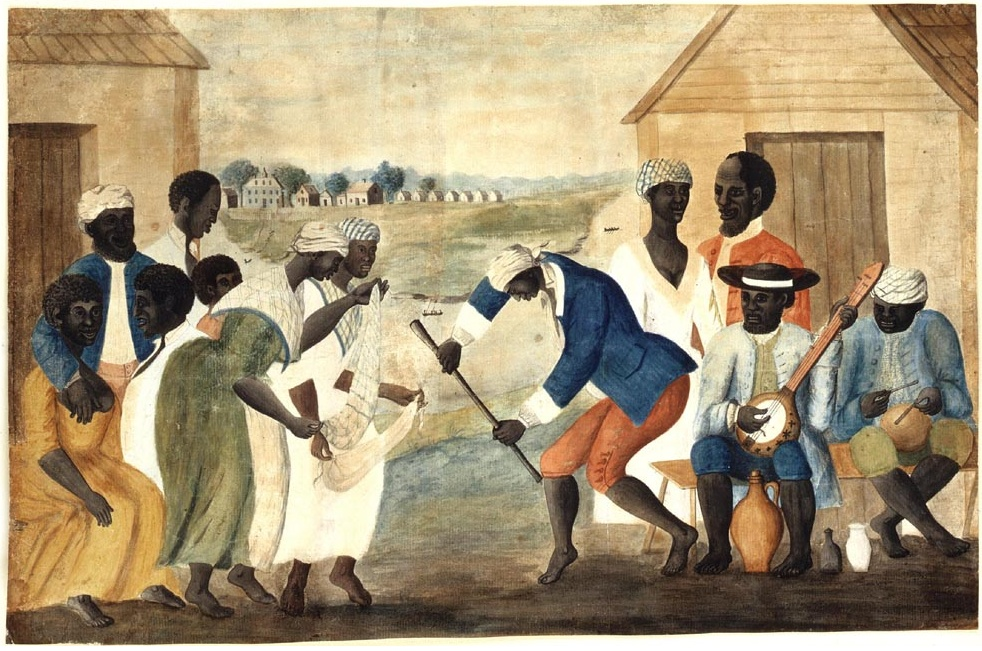
African-American slaves dancing to banjo and percussion (1780s)

In 1660, wool made up two thirds of Welsh exports. Slaveowners in the West Indies and the American colonies found that slaves were more productive if they were clothed. William Lee of Virginia stated that "Good Welch cotton seems upon the whole to answer best", and others were "light and insufficient." The main market was at Shrewsbury. The demand for colours was limited. In the 1730s, a Charleston merchant ordered "White, Bleue, & Green plains for Negro Clothing." The South Carolina "Negro Act" of 1735 commended "white Welsh plains" and outlawed rich or colourful materials that might be discarded by the slave masters. In the 1770s one observer said the whole purpose of Welsh woollens was "covering the poor Negroes in the West Indies."

Before 1800, there were very few factories in Wales, and almost all production was at home. As trans-Atlantic demand for Welsh cloth grew, growing numbers of people in the rural areas of Montgomeryshire and Merionethshire became dependent on the woollen industry, finding that spinning and weaving gave a larger and more stable income than farming. Some hamlets grew into woollen manufacturing centres. For example, Trefeglwys tripled in size during the 18th century. In the last decades of the 18th century, there was a great expansion of woollen production. Sales of stockings at Bala rose from £10,000 to £18,000 annually, and the annual profit of flannel sales in Montgomeryshire was more than £40,000.

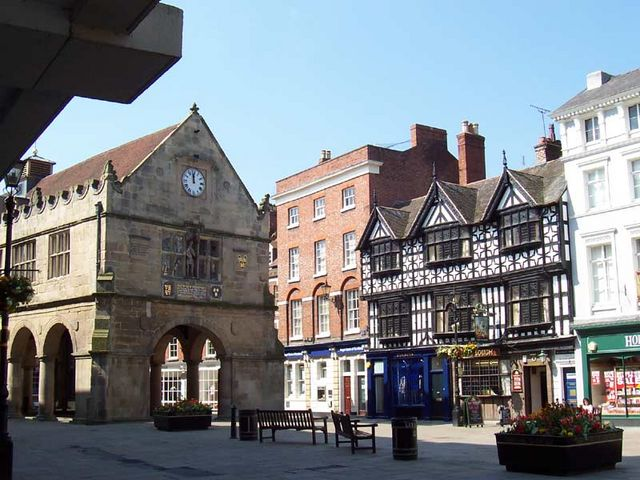
Old Market Hall, Shrewsbury (left), where most Welsh cloth was traded on the second floor for many years

At first, much of the cloth was shipped via Shrewsbury and London, but later the specialized Atlantic port of Bristol became the main place from which Welsh plains were shipped across the Atlantic. Over time, factors from Liverpool and Bristol took control of the trade away from the Shrewsbury drapers. Instead of the weavers carrying their cloth to the market towns, the factors came to them to buy the cloth. The factors would extend credit to the poorer weavers so they could buy wool. The Shrewsbury Drapers were losing their control of the trade by 1770. The port of Barmouth exported woollen products worth £50,000 around the world in the 1770s. An author wrote of Shrewsbury in the 1790s,

From very early days this place possessed almost exclusively the trade with Wales in a coarse kind of woollen cloth called Welsh webbs, which were brought from Merioneth and Montgomeryshire to a market held here weekly on Thursdays. They were afterwards dressed, that is, the wool raised on one side, by a set of people called Shearmen. At the time of Queen Elizabeth, the trade was so great, that not fewer than 600 persons maintained themselves by this occupation. The cloth was sent chiefly to America to clothe the negroes, or to Flanders, where it is used by the peasants. At present the greatest part of this traffick is diverted into other channels, and not more than four or five hundred thousand yards are brought to the ancient mart. Flannels both coarse and fine are purchased at Welsh-Pool, on every other Monday, by the drapers of Shrewsbury, who now principally enjoy this branch of commerce.

By the end of the century, the market in Shrewsbury had almost ceased, and in March 1803 the Company gave up the great room in which the trading had been conducted. In 1804 report by Mr. Evans of his tour through north Wales said,

The webbs used to be carried to Liverpool or Shrewsbury to market; but the Liverpool dealers have now persons in pay on the spot, to purchase of the makers; and to assist the poorer manufacturers with money to carry on their trade ... Since this, the drapers of Shrewsbury are obliged to go up to the country, and purchase the articles in small quantities at farms and cottages. After undergoing the operation of scouring, bleaching, and milling, it is packed up in large bales, and sent to Shrewsbury, Liverpool, and London; and thence exported to Germany, Russia and America.

19th century mill towns and ports

== Industrial era ==
=== North Wales ===
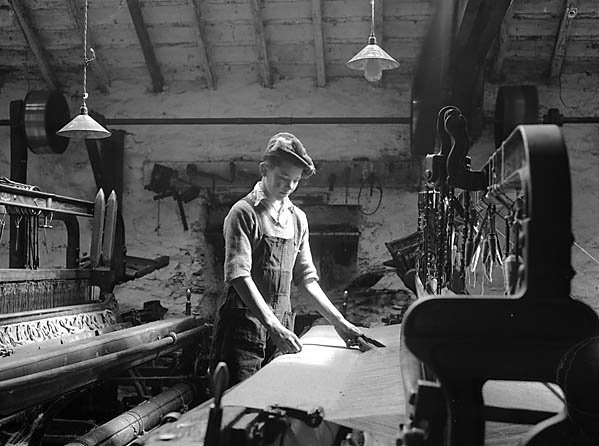
Penmachno Woollen Mill, 1952

By the 18th century a transition was under way to textile production in workshops run by businessmen. However, the technological revolution took much longer in Wales than it had in England, with slow adoption of machinery. Until the latter part of the 18th century carding and spinning was done at home, and weaving in the village ty-gwydd (loom house), although fulling was done by machine in fulling mills. A 1799 report said

The chief staple commodities of North Wales, as well as of the nation at large, are those manufactured of wool. ... In Anglesey, the inhabitants buy quantities of the Snowdon coarse wool, at the fairs of Caernarvon, and Bangor; out of which, mixed with their own wool, they manufacture deep blue coloured cloth, flannels, blankets, &c. a sufficience for home use and no more. ... In Caernarvonshire, they apply themselves somewhat more to spinning and weaving; for, besides supplying themselves with wearing apparel, they annually send several pieces of blue cloth into Meirionyddshire ... In Flintshire, and the greater part of Denbighshire, they are still less disposed to the exercise of the wheel and the loom. ... In other parts of Denbighshire, in the south west of Meirionyddshire and Montgomeryshire, the inhabitants have imbibed more of the spirit of industry; and add the profits of manufacture to the value of the raw material...

Mill owners were not always men. There are records of three women mill owners in Wales in 1840, Mary Powell with 16 looms and 8 men, Ann Harris with 14 employees including 6 men, and Ann Whiled with 9 employees. Large spinning mills continued to operate in Llangollen in the north throughout the 19th century. For example, the Trefriw Woollen Mills, originally called the Vale of Conwy Woollen Mill, was built in 1820 on the banks of the Afon Crafnant. Thomas Williams purchased the mill in 1859 and expanded the business. Products from the woollen mills were taken to the coast from the quay at Trefiw using the River Conwy. A 36 feet (11 m) diameter overshot wheel powered spinning mules and jennies. The yarn was then woven into cloth on hand looms. A smaller 7 feet (2.1 m) wheel powered a fulling mill, which washed the cloth and kneaded it with wooden hammers to thicken and strengthen it. The mill was still in operation (in a newer building) as of 2016.

=== Mid-Wales ===
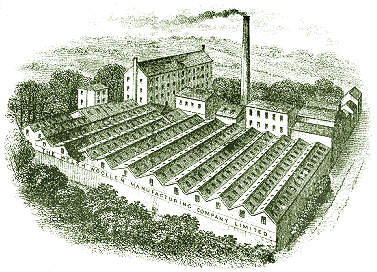
Cambrian Mills, Newtown, Wales in 1875

Between 1800 and 1830 many spinning and weaving factories were built in mid-Wales in places where water power was available, particularly in the upper Severn Valley in Powys. Towns such as Welshpool, Newtown and Llanidloes tripled in size and became industrial towns, although they were dwarfed by the English centres of Bradford and Leeds. Improvements were made in the transportation network during the 1830s. A new road was opened between Builth and Newtown, enabling flannel to be transported by cart to South Wales. Additionally, a canal route was extended from Garthmyl to Newtown in 1821, which provided an important link to the Shropshire canal. However, due to lack of capital the factories often went bankrupt when trade turned down. When steam power began to be used by the Yorkshire woollen industry the Severn Valley mills were at a disadvantage, since they did not have nearby supplies of coal. In 1835 the Montgomeryshire weaving towns still had only four power looms.

The 1840 Parliamentary Gazetteer wrote of Montgomeryshire that the flannel makers were facing competition from Lancashire imitation flannels, although these were not as good as the Welsh. Hand looms were preferred to power looms for the finer qualities of flannel, and experiments with power looms at Newport and Welshpool had been abandoned. Welsh wool had much improved in quality, but Radnorshire or South Devon wool was still best for flannel manufacture. The farmers, especially around Llanbrynmair, employed their agricultural labourers in spinning and weaving in the winter months. The gazetteer noted that, "the principle of total abstinence from intoxicating liquors has much benefited the weavers in this county : they were formerly notorious for inebriety and improvidence." In 1838 there were 61 mills in the county, mainly water-powered, employing 507 males and 216 females.

In 1847 Llanidloes was continuing to grow despite competition from Newtown. The Cambrian Mirror reported that, "There are now more than 40 carding engines, 18 fulling mills, and nearly 35,000 spindles, constantly in operation in the town and neighbourhood, affording considerable employment to a number of men, who weave the flannel at their own dwellings. Pryce Pryce-Jones of Newtown began a mail-order business in flannels in 1859, a very innovative move for the time. He was at first extremely successful, and the London and North Western Railway ran a daily service with special vans to carry his products to Euston station in London. Between 1850 and 1870 the mill owners in Llanidloes and Newtown invested heavily in buildings and steam-powered machinery. They hoped that the railway, which reached the towns between 1861 and 1863, would give them access to new markets. In fact, the railway caused mass-produced goods from northern England to flood into central Wales. Newtown, which once was called the "Leeds of Wales", went into decline from the 1860s.

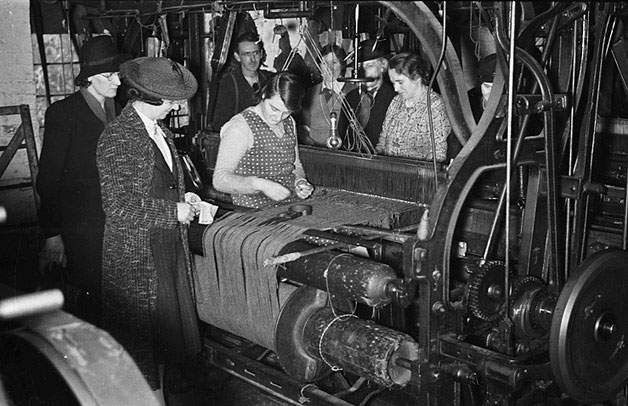
Worker weaving tweed at the loom at Montgomeryshire's last tweed mill at Mochdre

There were periods of renewed prosperity. The Cambrian Mills in Newtown was purchased in 1866 by the Cambrian Flannel Company of Newtown and Llanidloes, which modernized the factory so it was the most advanced facility in Wales and diversified into making plain and coloured flannels, shawls, whittles, hose and tweeds. Later the Newtown woollen industry again went into decline. The Pryce-Jones "Welsh" flannel was eventually mostly made in Rochdale, Lancashire. After the Cambrian Mills burned down in 1912 Newtown was no longer an important woollen industrial centre and many of the workers moved elsewhere.

Welsh tweed manufacture survived at a much reduced level into the 20th century in Montgomery, where the area around Rhayader retained mills in the villages and small towns. Newtown continued to make flannel, although Rochdale in northwest England took market share with its "real Welch flannel." J. Geraint Jenkins has speculated that if a railway line had instead connected the Severn Valley to the south Wales coalfield the mid-Wales woollen industry could have been supported by demand for flannel from the miners, as were the woollen mills of the Teifi valley in the later part of the 19th century.

=== South Wales ===
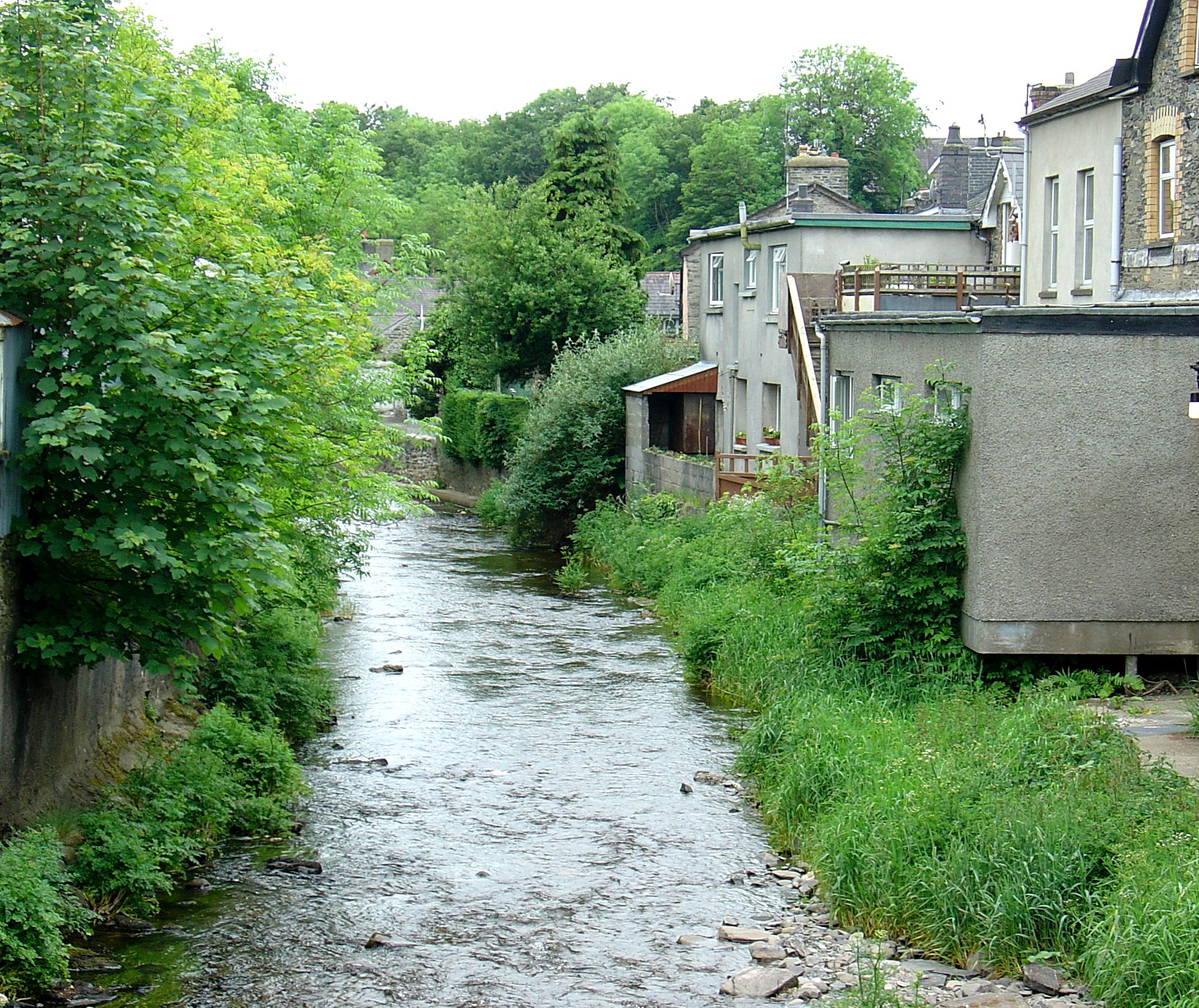
River Brenig, Teifi tributary, in Tregaron. The Tregaron area had a number of water-driven woollen mills and was a centre for manufacture of knitted hosiery.

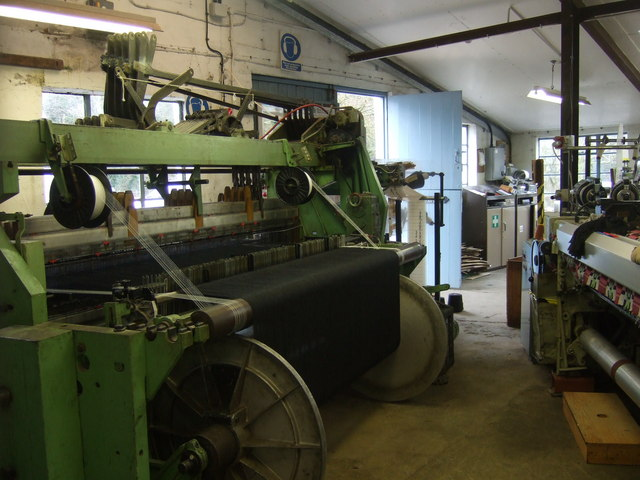
Loom at Melin Tregwynt

During the Industrial Revolution the Teifi Valley between Ceredigion and Carmarthenshire came to employ thousands of weavers, spinners, dyers, knitters, drapers and tailors. The river and its tributaries powered dozens of mills, and sheep in the surrounding grassland supplied fleeces to be made into woollen products. In 1837 a Working Men's Association was established in the south Wales weaving town of Carmarthen in response to the Chartist campaign for democratic rights. By the summer of 1839 three more towns in the region had founded such societies, and the first Chartist convention had been held.

While manufacturing declined in mid-Wales after the 1860s, the weaving industry grew in villages in south-west Wales, which did well until the 1920s. Skilled workers moved from mid-Wales to the Teifi Valley, mainly to the area around Dre-fach Felindre, Pentrecwrt, Henllan and Llandysul. A railway was opened from Carmarthen to Lampeter in 1864, and large mills were developed such as the Alltcafan and Derw factories at Pentrecwrt. Dre-fach Felindre was once called "The Huddersfield of Wales" for its wool industry. The Cambrian Mills in this village made blankets, shawls, stockings and other products for local sale and for export.

The water-powered factories in the south west were completely dependent on demand from the nearby South Wales coalfield, whose workers preferred Welsh goods. They could not compete with the mills of northern England in other markets. The Teifi Valley Railway, opened in 1895, further strengthened the link from the rural south west to the industrial south. The woollen industry flourished in South Wales until the end of World War I (1914–18), with high prices during the war. At one time there were more than 300 active woollen mills.

The woollen mills of the Teifi valley were hard-hit by the drop in purchasing power of miners during the depression in the coal trade of the 1920s. In the inter-war period (1918–39) most woollen manufacturers did not adapt to changes in fashion and were forced to close. Small clusters of hand loom weaving survived in places such as Lampeter where there were spinners and fullers, making quality goods. A weaver said of this work, "One can make a fair living by it, but a man can never get rich at it."

The number of active mills dropped from 250 in 1926 to 81 in 1947 and 24 in 1974, increasingly concentrated in industrial centres. However, the invention of the double weave and light tweeds caused significant growth in demand for Welsh textiles. When Burberry bought the Treorchy plant in the 1980s, 75% of the workers were women. The plant was closed in March 2007.

== Today ==
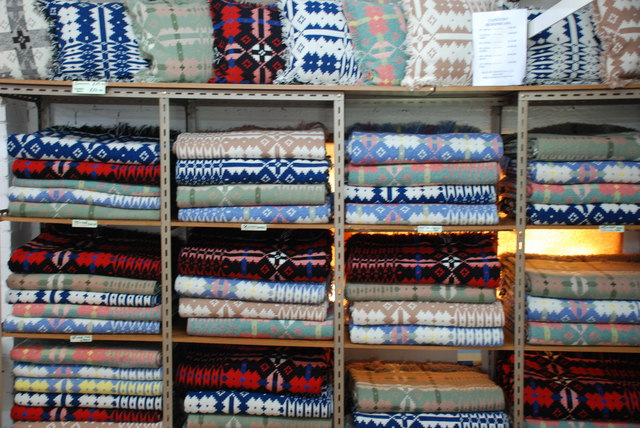
Double-woven tapestry blankets in the factory shop at Melin Brynkir.

As of 2013 there were just nine commercial woollen mills still in operation, often run by small families producing traditional Welsh cloth on old looms. Although demand for their products is high, there are few apprentices entering the industry. The Cambrian Woollen Mill at Dre-fach Felindre was acquired by the state in 1976 for the Museum of the Welsh Woollen Industry, now named the National Wool Museum. Water powered woollen mills that were open to the public as of 2016 include Melin Tregwynt, Rock Mill Llandysul, Solva Woollen Mill and Trefriw Woollen Mills. In 2016 the Amgueddfa Cymru – National Museum Wales listed the following active woollen mills:

County	Mill	Location
North Wales	Trefriw Woollen Mills	Trefriw
Gwynedd	Brynkir Woollen Mill	Garndolbenmaen
Powys	Cambrian Woollen Mill	Llanwrtyd Wells
Ceredigion	Curlew Weavers	Rhydlewis, Llandysul
Ceredigion	Rock Mill Llandysul	Capel Dewi, Llandysul
Carmarthenshire	Elvet Woollen Mill	Carmarthen
Carmarthenshire	Melin Dolwerdd	Dre-fach Felindre
Carmarthenshire	Melin Teifi, National Wool Museum	Dre-fach Felindre
Cardiff	Esgair Moel, St Fagans National History Museum	St Fagans
Monmouthshire	Sioni Rhys Handweavers	Pandy
Pembrokeshire	Riitta Sinkkonen Davies Handweaving	Haverfordwest
Pembrokeshire	Snail Trail Handweavers	Cilgerran
Pembrokeshire	Melin Trefin	Trefin
Pembrokeshire	Melin Tregwynt	Castlemorris
Pembrokeshire	Solva Woollen Mill	Middle Mill

== See also ==
- Textile manufacturing by pre-industrial methods
- Textile manufacture during the Industrial Revolution
- Wool

== See also ==
- Textile mills in Wales
