= Manufacturing in Wales =

The manufacturing sector in Wales was historically centred on the mining industry, with slate, coal, tinplate and steel being important industries. Today, while traditional industries remain in smaller quantities, manufacturing in Wales is increasingly specialised and diverse, including parts of the automotive, aerospace, medical and technological industries.

== Heavy industry ==
=== Slate ===
The Penrhyn Quarry is still producing slate, though at a much reduced capacity from its heyday at the end of the 19th century. In 1995, it accounted for almost 50% of UK production. It is currently owned and operated by Welsh Slate Ltd (part of the Breedon Group ). It was previously owned by the Lagan Group, which also owned and carried out some operations at the Oakeley quarry at Blaenau Ffestiniog, the Pen yr Orsedd quarry in the Nantlle Vale, and the Cwt-y-Bugail quarry. In March 2010 the company announced its decision to mothball the Oakeley quarry because of subsidence at the site.

The Greaves Welsh Slate Company produces roofing slates and other slate products from Llechwedd, and work also continues at the Berwyn Quarry near Llangollen. The final large-scale underground working to close was Maenofferen, associated with the Llechwedd tourist mine, in 1999: part of this site, now effectively amalgamated with Votty / Bowydd, is still worked by untopping. The Wales Millennium Centre in Cardiff uses waste slate in many different colours in its design: purple slate from Penrhyn, blue from Cwt-y-Bugail, green from Nantlle, grey from Llechwedd, and black from Corris.

=== Coal ===
Today, Aberpergwm is the only producer of high-grade anthracite in Western Europe, creating a high-carbon coal which creates a clean burn with low emissions, low sulphur, and high efficiency. Although some product is still transported to Port Talbot Steelworks, now most of the output is finely crushed to produce a carbon product suitable for use in carbon filtering.

=== Steel ===
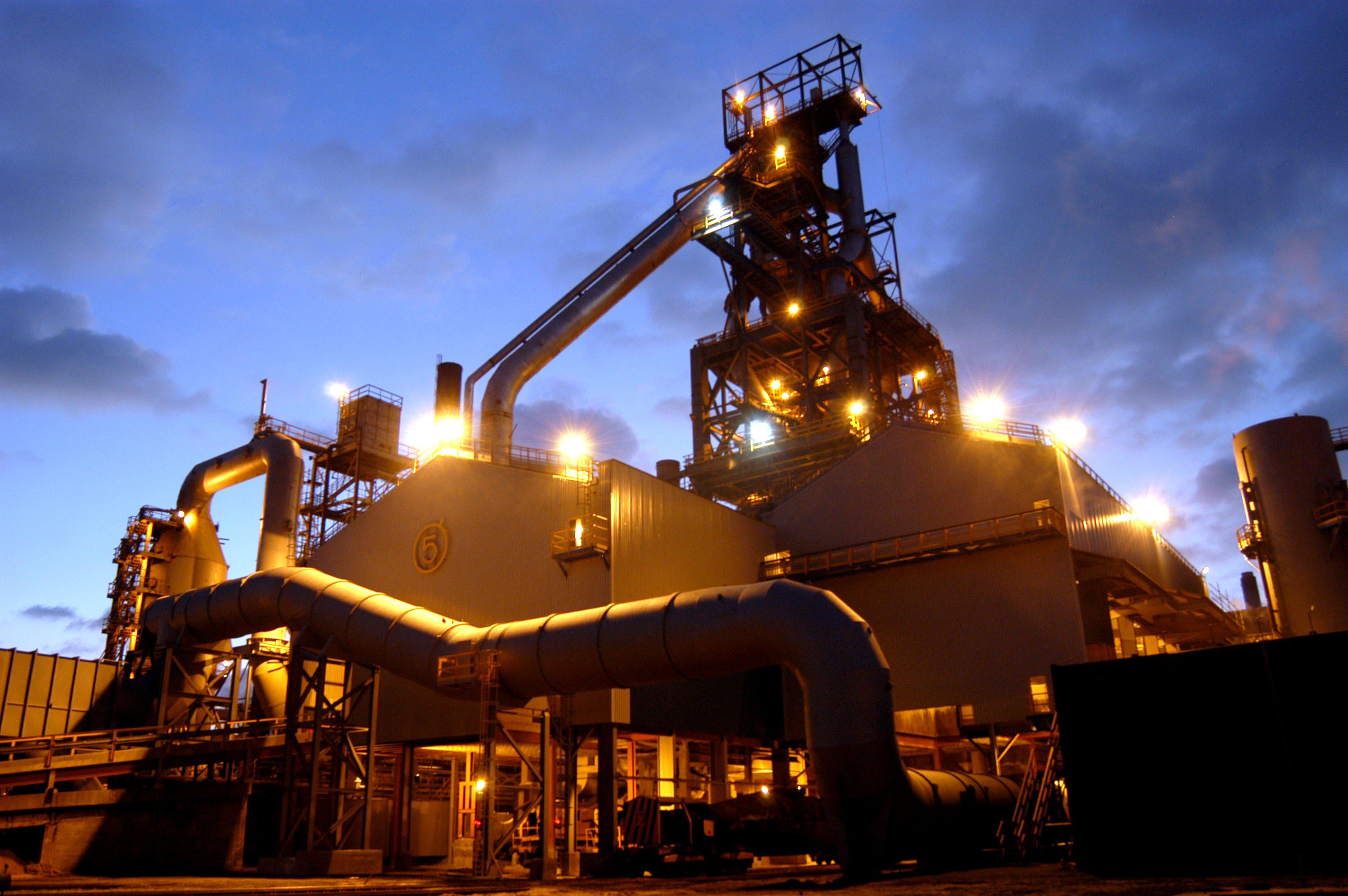
Port Talbot Steelworks, one of the last remaining heavy industrial plants in south Wales

Metal ore refining is a long established industry in Wales. As of 2007, Corus had manufacturing facilities at Port Talbot, Llanwern, Newport, Trostre, Shotton, Ammanford, Pontardulais, Tafarnaubach and Caerphilly, although only the Port Talbot Steelworks remains as a major integrated steelmaking plant.

The Indian steelmaker, TATA steel employs almost 7,000 across six steel working sites in Wales. The largest site Port Talbot which employs 4,000 workers, then Llanwern with over 1,000 workers followed by Shotton in Flintshire with 700. Around 650 workers are employed at Trostre, in Llanelli. Sites also exist at Newport and Caerphilly.

Pro Steel Engineering is a steel specialist company based in Wales operating internationally. The company has delivered high-profile work, including collaborative projects such as the London Olympic Stadium Transformation and ICC Wales’ 22 tonne steel Welsh dragon.

=== Tinplate and aluminium ===
Nearly all the tinplate and much of the aluminium produced in the UK are made in Welsh plants.

== Construction ==
JCB has a factory and shop in Wrexham which recently (2001) recruited 20 new workers.

== Oil refining ==
Milford Haven now has only one remaining oil refinery:

== Tool making ==
FSG Tool & Die is largest, privately owned design and build toolmaking company in Europe and is based in Llantrisant business park, Mid Glamorgan.

== Automotive industry ==
Aston Martin Lagonda Production & Technology Centre St Athan, Wales

Following its February 2016 announcement, the St Athans Aston Martin plant in South Wales announced the creation of 750 new jobs. It had a series of recruitment events in South Wales that gained over 3,000 applications. Within 6 months the first 40 technicians were recruited to work on the new DB11 at Aston Martin's Gaydon Headquarters, training for the highly skilled jobs to work in St Athan.

The St Athan manufacturing plant officially opened in December 2019, with full production of the DBX SUV beginning in the second quarter of 2020.

== Aerospace industry ==
=== Airbus ===
The current Airbus Broughton (Flintshire) site was founded in 1939 as a shadow factory for the production of the Vickers Wellington and the Avro Lancaster. After the War De Havilland took over the factory and it was used to produce various aircraft, including the Mosquito and the Comet.

Airbus Broughton is one example of the development of an advanced manufacturing sector in Wales. The site produces the wing assembly for all Airbus aircraft, with the exception of the Chinese A320s and the A400M. Airbus wings are transported by Airbus Beluga or ship (in the case of the A380) to the final assembly lines at Airbus Toulouse.

=== General Electric ===
General Electric (GE) on Caerphilly Road, Nantgarw in Wales handles the world's largest and most fuel efficient aviation engine, GE9X.

== Titanium ==
TIMET has a plant in Waunarlwydd, Swansea, which is one of the world's major suppliers of titanium for jet engine blades and medical applications.

== Medical ==
Creo Medical, based in Chepstow, is an emerging medical technology company which is developing medical technologies with the aim of substantially benefiting the medical community and vastly improving the outcomes of a range of medical procedures.

RotoMedical has emerged as a leading Welsh manufacturer of PPE and medical equipment. The company produces specifically industrial gauges, ultrasonic level transmitters, temperature probes and pressure measurement equipment.

== Electronics ==
A short video by the Welsh Government on some of the technology companies in Wales

During the 1980s and 1990s, a major growth sector in manufacturing was the electronics industry with over 130 North American and 35 Japanese companies establishing operations in Wales.

== Delivery and postal ==
The Safety Letterbox Company Ltd is a Parcelbox manufacturer that supplies over 180 models throughout the UK and worldwide which was started and is based in Neath. The company employs 62 people.

== Wool ==
As of 2013 there were just nine commercial woollen mills still in operation, often run by small families producing traditional Welsh cloth on old looms. Although demand for their products is high, there are few apprentices entering the industry. The Cambrian Woollen Mill at Dre-fach Felindre was acquired by the state in 1976 for the Museum of the Welsh Woollen Industry, now named the National Wool Museum. Water powered woollen mills that were open to the public as of 2016 include Melin Tregwynt, Rock Mill Llandysul, Solva Woollen Mill and Trefriw Woollen Mills.

== Export ==
Excluding intra UK trade, the European Union and the United States constitute the largest markets for Wales's exports. Recently, with the high rates of growth in many emerging economies of southeast Asia and the Middle East such as China, UAE and Singapore, there has been a drive towards marketing Welsh products and manufactured goods in these countries, with China and Qatar entering the top ten destinations for Welsh exports in 2013.

The total value of international exports from Wales in 2015 was estimated at £12.2 billion (2014: £13.4 billion). The top five exporting industries in 2013 were power generating machinery £4.0 billion (2013: £4.2 billion), petroleum, petroleum products & related materials £2.6 billion (2013: £3.8 billion), Iron & Steel £1.288 billion (2013: £1.3 billion), electric machinery £0.69 billion (2013: £0.7 billion), and professional and scientific services £0.346 billion (2013: £0.353 billion).

Top 10 export destinations, 2017
Destination	Value
Germany	▲£3.21 billion
France	▲£2.73 billion
United States	▲£2.29 billion
Ireland	▲£1.04 billion
Netherlands	▲£0.69 billion
UAE	▲£0.56 billion
Spain	▲£0.47 billion
Belgium	▼£0.46 billion
Canada	▲£0.36 billion
Turkey	▲£0.35 billion
Source: Welsh exports: Fourth quarter 2015
