= Cambrian Woollen Mill =

Operational woollen mill in mid Wales

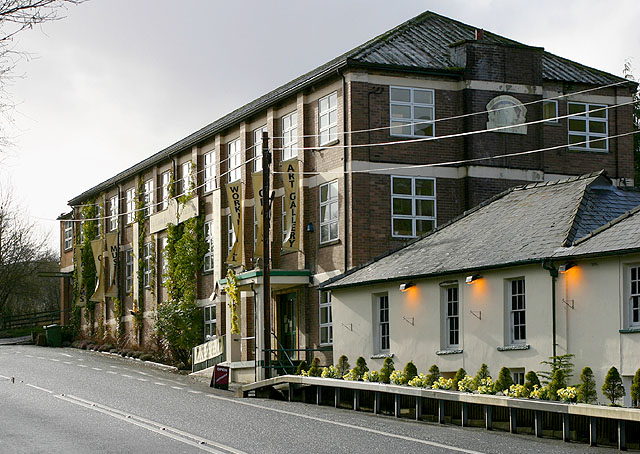
- Mill in 2007

- Location of the mill in Powys
- Built: 1890s
- Location: www.cambrianmill.co.uk; Llanwrtyd Wells, Powys, Wales
- Coordinates: 52.114694°N 3.630349°W
- Industry: Woollen industry in Wales
- Products: Blankets, throws, rugs, shawls

Cambrian Woollen Mill, just north of Llanwrtyd Wells, Powys, is one of the few remaining operational woollen mills in Wales. It is known for its line of Welsh tartans. The building dates to 1820.

== History ==
The Cambrian Mill is situated beside the Afon Irfon on the edge of Mynydd Epynt and the Cambrian Mountains. The Brecon Beacons and Carmarthen Fans lie to the south. The building dates to 1820, when it opened as a corn mill, which was converted to a Welsh flannel weaving mill. The mill carded, dyed, spun and wove local wool, using water power until about 1860.

Before World War II (1939–45) the mill supplied woollen products to Queen Mary and Queen Elizabeth The Queen Mother. It has been visited by Elizabeth II (before her accession to the throne) and Charles, Prince of Wales. The woollen industry in Wales declined in the 20th century, partly due to competition from more modern English mills. The Cambrian mill is one of a handful of mills that are left.

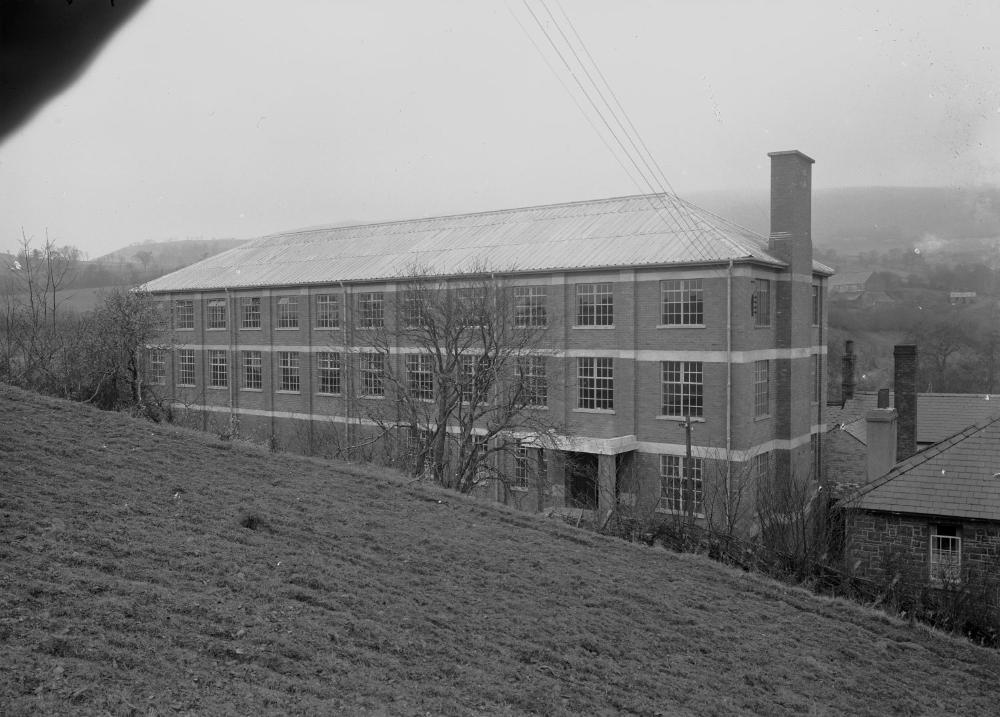
Mill exterior, early 20th century

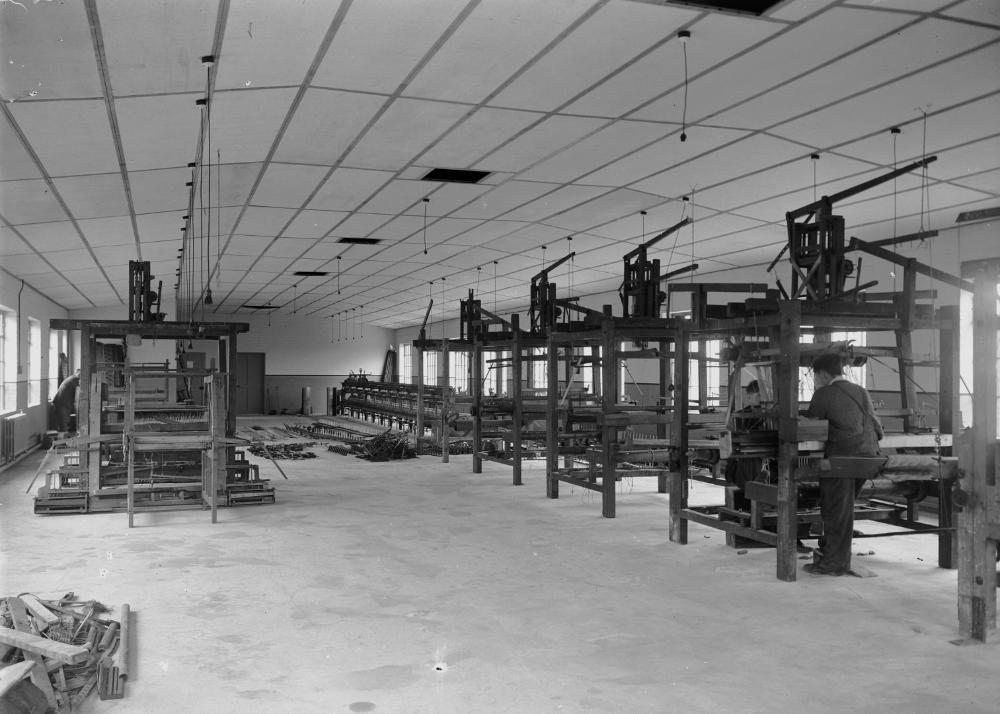
Textile machinery in the 1940s

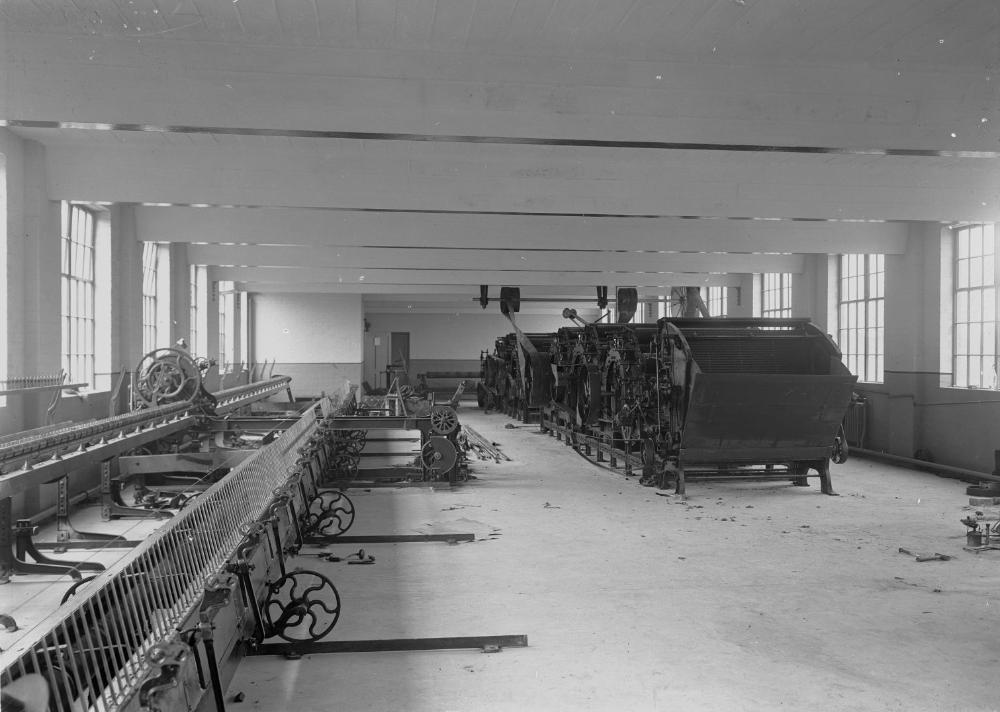
Textile machinery in the 1940s

== Today ==
The mill produces blankets, throws, scarves, ties, hats and fabric. It also designs and weaves 37 Welsh tartans. The mill weaves all the wool cloth for the Welsh Tartan Centre. The mill has a tea and gift shop, a crafts studio and an exhibit of historical weaving in Wales. In 2014 Hefin Jones of Cardigan designed a pressurized space suit made from Welsh wool supplied by Cambrian Woollen Mill as well as Melin Tregwynt, Melin Teifi and the National Wool Museum.

== Sources ==
- "About Cambrian Woollen Mill", Wales Tartan Centres
- Cambrian Mill History, Cambrian Mill
- "Cambrian Mill, Llanidloes, which was destroyed by fire in November 1889", Gathering the Jewels
- "Cambrian Woollen Mill & Heritage Centre", Visit Wales
- "Cambrian Woollen Mill", Mid Wales My Way, archived from the original on 11 May 2017
- Griffiths, Sarah (29 January 2014), "Hefin Jones' daring plan to bring the future of space exploration to WALES", Capitalbay
- "Welsh Kilt", Welsh Kilt
