= Capel Dewi, Llandysul =

Village in Ceredigion, Wales

Coordinates: 52.059277°N 4.254993°W

Capel Dewi: Welsh: Capel Dewi
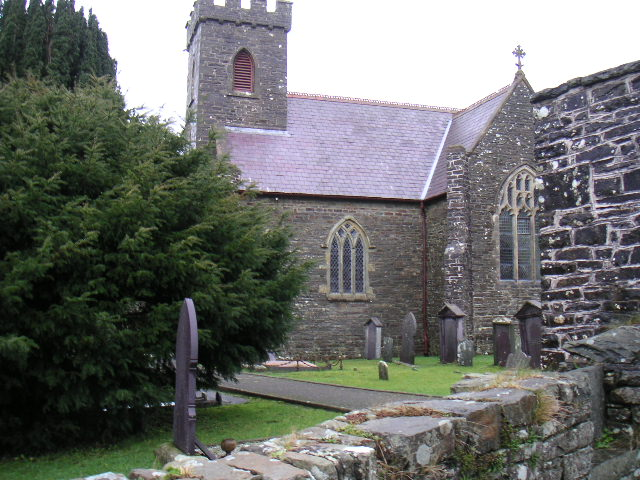

- Location within Ceredigion
- Population: 1,293 (ward 2011)
- OS grid reference: SN455425
- Principal area: Ceredigion
- Preserved county: Dyfed
- Country: Wales
- Sovereign state: United Kingdom
- Post town: Llandysul
- Postcode district: SA44
- Police: Dyfed-Powys
- Fire: Mid and West Wales
- Ambulance: Welsh
- UK Parliament: Ceredigion Preseli
- Senedd Cymru – Welsh Parliament: Ceredigion Penfro

Capel Dewi is a small village in the county of Ceredigion, Wales. The village lies in the Clettwr Valley mostly on the eastern bank of the River Clettwr, a tributary of the River Teifi. Capel Dewi is part of the community of Llandysul along with the settlements of Horeb, Pont-Siân, Pren-gwyn, Tregroes, Rhydowen and the village of Llandysul itself. The village is one of two settlements in Ceredigion called Capel Dewi, the other being the smaller Capel Dewi near Aberystwyth.

The village is home to several buildings of note, including the Rock Mill. Opened in 1890, the Rock Mill is a waterwheel powered woollen mill, the last commercial woollen mill remaining in Wales. Capel Dewi also has its own church, St David's Church, which gives the village its name. The church, which is in the centre of the village, was made a Grade II listed building in 1993.
