= Amgueddfa Cymru – Museum Wales =

Network of national museums in Wales

Amgueddfa Cymru Museum Wales
- Logo used since August 2022

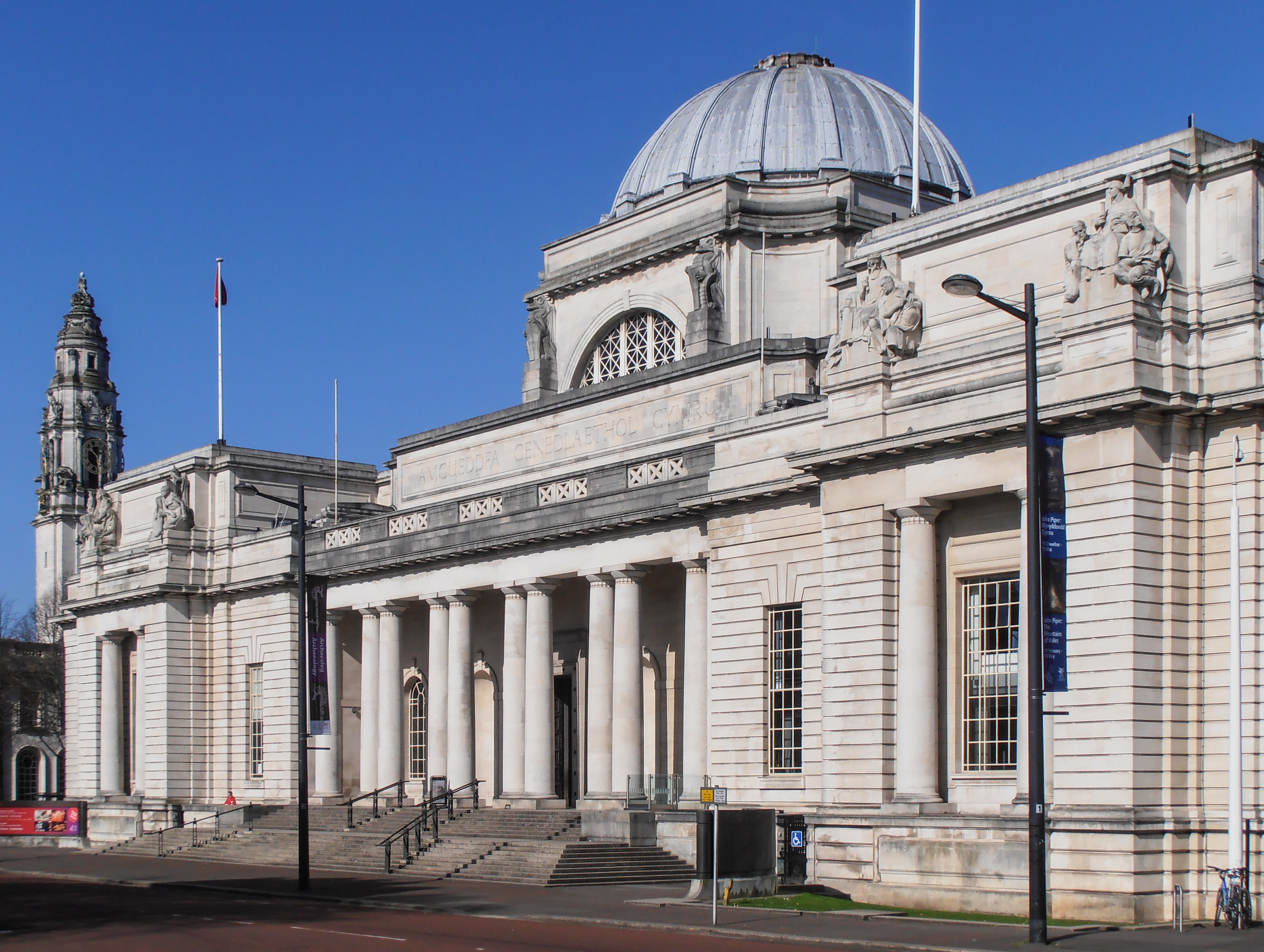
- National Museum Cardiff, its main site
- Locations of its branches (in red) and other sites (in blue) connected to the body.
- Established: 1907
- Location: Cardiff; Blaenavon; Llanberis; Swansea; Caerleon; Dre-fach Felindre; St Davids
- Type: Welsh Government sponsored body
- Visitors: 1.89+ million (2017)
- Directors: Jane Richardson, Director General
- Website: museum.wales

Amgueddfa Cymru – Museum Wales, branded as simply Amgueddfa Cymru (formerly the National Museums and Galleries of Wales and legally National Museum of Wales), is a Welsh Government sponsored body that comprises seven museums in Wales. Established by Royal Charter in 1907, it is one of the largest museum networks in the United Kingdom and Wales's most important cultural institution.

The organisation operates seven museums across Wales: National Museum Cardiff (its flagship site), St Fagans National Museum of History, Big Pit National Coal Museum, National Wool Museum, National Slate Museum, National Roman Legion Museum, and the National Waterfront Museum. It also runs Oriel y Parc, a gallery partnership in St Davids, and maintains the National Collections Centre in Nantgarw as its storage facility.

Amgueddfa Cymru houses internationally significant collections spanning natural history, archaeology, art, and industrial heritage, with particular emphasis on Welsh cultural and scientific specimens. The network attracts over 1.89 million visitors annually, making it one of Wales's most popular tourist attractions. St Fagans National Museum of History, established in 1948, was the United Kingdom's first national open-air museum and remains Europe's leading open-air museum.

The organisation's mission, encapsulated in its vision "Inspiring people, changing lives", focuses on preserving and interpreting Wales's cultural and natural heritage. Originally conceived to illustrate the geology, mineralogy, zoology, botany, ethnography, archaeology, art, history and special industries of Wales, the institution has evolved to reflect contemporary museological practices whilst maintaining its core educational and research functions. The network is funded by the Welsh Government and admission to all sites is free.

== History ==
=== Founding (1905–1907) ===
The National Museum of Wales was founded in 1905, with its royal charter granted by King Edward VII on 19 March 1907. The 1907 Charter stated that the museum's purpose was to be achieved primarily by the complete illustration of the geology, mineralogy, zoology, botany, ethnography, archaeology, art, history and special industries of Wales. The establishment of the museum was part of a broader movement of Welsh cultural and educational institutions, coinciding with the founding of the National Library of Wales, which received its Royal Charter on the same date.

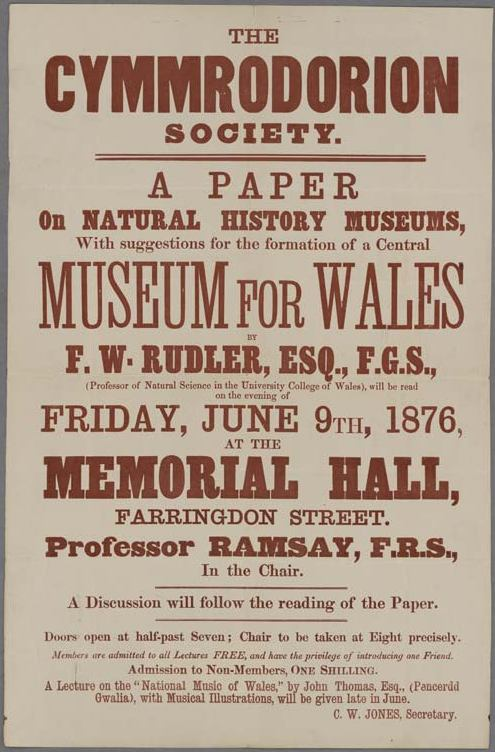
Poster by the Honourable Society of Cymmrodorion suggesting the formation of a National Museum of Wales, June 1876.

Part of the bid for Cardiff to obtain the National Museum for Wales included the gift of the Cardiff Museum Collection, then known as "Welsh Museum of Natural History, Archaeology and Art," which was formally handed over in 1912. The Cardiff Museum had previously been sharing the building of Cardiff Library and was a sub-department of the library until 1893.

=== Early development and construction (1908–1927) ===
Construction of the new building in the civic complex of Cathays Park began in 1912, designed by architects Arnold Dunbar Smith and Cecil Brewer. The Foundation Stone was laid by King George V on 26 June 1912. However, owing to the First World War, construction was significantly delayed and the museum did not open to the public until 28 October 1922, with the official opening ceremony taking place in 1927.

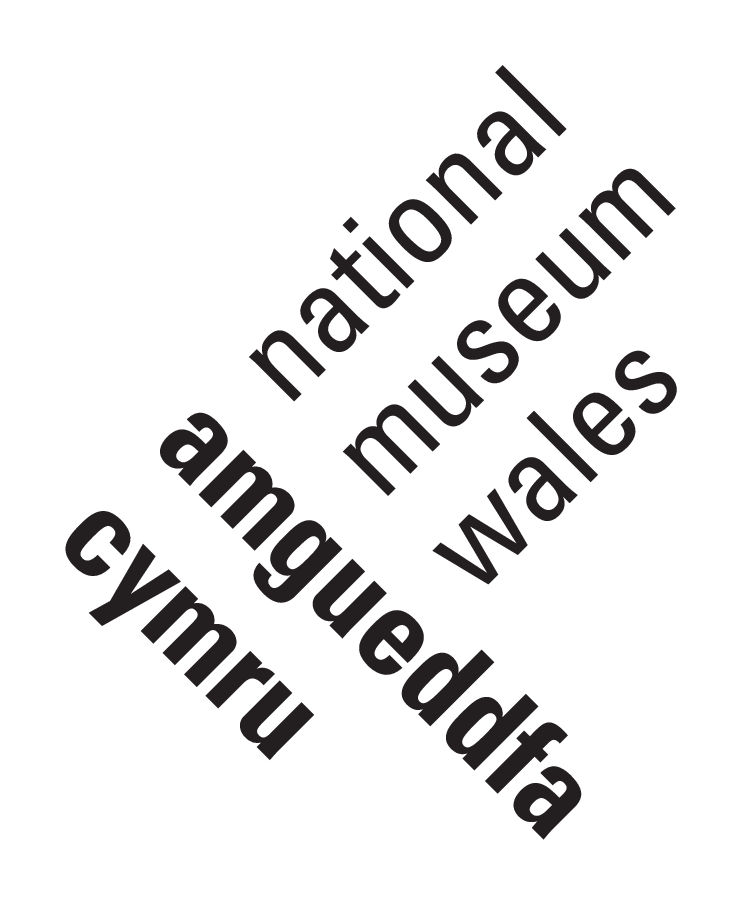
Previous National Museum Wales logo used until August 2022

The first directors to lead the institution were William Evans Hoyle (1908–1924) and the renowned archaeologist Sir Mortimer Wheeler (1925–1926), followed by Sir Cyril Fox (1926–1948), who oversaw much of the museum's early development and expansion.

=== Network expansion (1940s–1960s) ===
The museum began expanding beyond its Cardiff headquarters in the mid-20th century. The most significant expansion came with the establishment of St Fagans National Museum of History. The museum was founded in 1946 following the donation of St Fagans Castle and its surrounding 18 acres of land by the Earl of Plymouth. It opened to the public on 1 July 1948 under the name of the Welsh Folk Museum, becoming the first National open-air museum within the United Kingdom.

The concept was the brainchild of Welsh poet and museum curator Iorwerth Peate, who was inspired by Skansen, the outdoor museum of vernacular Swedish architecture in Stockholm. St Fagans' collections have their roots in the 'Welsh Bygones' gallery which opened at the National Museum in Cathays Park in 1926.

=== Modernisation and industrial heritage (1970s–1990s) ===
By the early 1970s, the Museum had new exhibition galleries, offices and workrooms. Three new galleries were opened: the Gallery of Material Culture in 1970; the Agricultural Gallery in 1974; and the Costume gallery in 1976.

By the 1980s, Wales' industrial communities were as threatened as the rural way of life had been in the 1940s. A change of direction was needed. In 1987, the Rhyd-y-car ironworkers' cottages from Merthyr Tydfil were relocated to St Fagans. This marked a significant shift in the museum's focus to include Wales's industrial heritage alongside its traditional rural collections.

The network continued to grow with the establishment of specialist museums focused on Wales's industrial past, including the National Slate Museum in Llanberis, Big Pit National Coal Museum in Blaenavon, and the National Wool Museum in Dre-fach Felindre.

=== Contemporary developments (2000–present) ===
The 21st century has seen significant investment in the museum network. St Fagans underwent a six-year, £30-million revamp that was completed in 2018, and the museum was named the Art Fund Museum of the Year in 2019. This redevelopment included three new galleries showcasing Wales's history, improvements to buildings, and enhanced visitor facilities.

In 2015, Amgueddfa Cymru - National Museum Wales agreed a new Vision, "Inspiring people, changing lives", to guide all future activities. The organisation has also undertaken significant rebranding, with the current logo introduced in August 2022.

Directors have included Michael Houlihan (2003–2010) and David Anderson (2010–2023). The Director General since 2023 is Jane Richardson.

In late 2022 after a rebranding exercise, a new visual identity of "Amgueddfa Cymru" (Museum Wales in Welsh) was unveiled, which the museum said reflected its "pride in the language" and went one step further than the previous bilingual logo.

In October 2025, the museum launched its digital image library, Amgueddfa Cymru Images, offering free access to more than 2,000 images from the national collection, including photographs and images of objects reflecting Wales' social, industrial and natural heritage. along with images of artworks from its collection by Van Gogh, Monet and Renoir.

== Museums and sites ==
Amgueddfa Cymru comprises seven museums throughout Wales, plus one gallery partnership and a collections storage facility. The museums span different aspects of Welsh cultural and natural heritage, from fine art and natural history to industrial heritage and archaeology.

Institution	Type of collection	Location	Opened	Visitor numbers (2017)	Image	Ref.
National Museum Cardiff	Natural history, fine art, archaeology	Cardiff; Cathays Park	1922	▲539,550		
St Fagans National Museum of History	Social history, vernacular architecture, Welsh culture	Cardiff; St Fagans	1948	▲553,090		
Big Pit National Coal Museum	Coal mining history and industrial heritage	Blaenavon, Torfaen	1983	▲141,969		
National Waterfront Museum	Maritime history, industrial heritage, innovation	Swansea	2005	▲268,622		
National Slate Museum	Slate quarrying and Welsh industrial heritage	Llanberis, Gwynedd	1972	▲145,969		
National Roman Legion Museum	Roman archaeology and history	Caerleon, Newport	1850	▲70,021		
National Wool Museum	Welsh textile industry and wool production	Dre-fach Felindre, Carmarthenshire	1976	▲36,909		
Oriel y Parc	Welsh landscape art and Pembrokeshire heritage	St David's, Pembrokeshire	2005	—		
National Collections Centre	Collections storage and conservation	Nantgarw, Rhondda Cynon Taf	1993	—		

The locations of the branches of (and other sites connected to) Amgueddfa Cymru – Museum Wales

The industrial heritage museums, Big Pit National Coal Museum, National Slate Museum, and National Wool Museum, preserve and interpret Wales's industrial past, offering immersive experiences including underground mine tours at Big Pit and working demonstrations of traditional crafts at the other sites. The National Roman Legion Museum houses one of Britain's most important collections of Roman military artefacts from the Isca Augusta fortress.

=== Collections ===
Amgueddfa Cymru's collections span multiple disciplines and include internationally significant holdings. The natural history collections comprise over 6 million specimens including botanical, zoological, geological, and palaeontological materials, with particular strength in Welsh biodiversity and geological formations. The archaeology collections encompass material from prehistoric times through the medieval period, with notable Roman finds from Caerleon and prehistoric artefacts from across Wales.

The art collections include Welsh works from the 16th century to the present, European Old Masters, and one of the world's finest collections of Impressionist art, largely formed through the Davies sisters' bequest in the 1950s and 1960s. The industrial heritage collections document Wales's role in the Industrial Revolution, including tools, machinery, and social history material from coal mining, slate quarrying, and textile production.

== Administration ==
The following persons have served as Directors of the National Museum of Wales:

No.	Portrait	Director	Term start	Term end	Refs.
1		William Evans Hoyle	1908	1924	
2		Sir Mortimer Wheeler	1925	1926	
3		Sir Cyril Fox	1927	1948	
4		D. Dilwyn John	1948	1968	
5		Gwyn Jones	1968	1977	
6		Douglas Bassett	1977	1985	
7		David W. Dykes	1986	1989	
8		Alastair Wilson	1989	1993	
9		Colin Ford	1993	1998	
10		Anna Southall	1998	2002	
11		Michael Houlihan	2003	2010	
12		David Anderson	2010	2023	
13		Jane Richardson	2023	Incumbent	
