= Shrewsbury Drapers Company =

British trade organisation

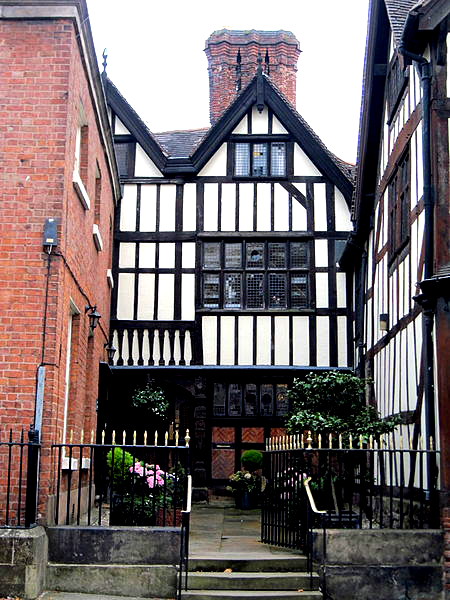
- Drapers Hall, Shrewsbury, now a boutique hotel
- Formation: 1462
- Founded at: Shrewsbury, Shropshire, England
- Type: Charity
- Registration no.: Charity No: 1132671
- Legal status: Active
- Purpose: Operation of almshouses
- Headquarters: 1 Frankwell, Shrewsbury, SY3 8LG
- Coordinates: 52.710946°N 2.759567°W
- Region served: Shrewsbury
- Services: Low-income housing
- Website: shrewsburydrapers.org.uk

The Shrewsbury Drapers Company was a trade organisation founded in 1462 in the town of Shrewsbury, Shropshire, England. The members were wholesale dealers in wool and later woollen cloth. The Company dominated the trade in Welsh cloth and in 1566 was given a regional monopoly in the Welsh Wool trade. In the seventeenth century the trade had difficulties particularly during the English Civil war and then further declined in the eighteenth century with the industrialisation of cloth production and the improvement of transport infrastructure. This made it practical for merchants from Liverpool and elsewhere to travel into Wales and purchase cloth directly from the producers. The Reform Acts of the early nineteenth century took away the power of the trade guilds and the trade ceased. Since that time the Shrewsbury Drapers Company has survived and continues as a charity that runs almshouses in Shrewsbury.

Please note

The image shown in the infobox on the right is not Drapers Hall it is The Old House on Dogpole just around the corner from Shrewsbury Drapers` Hall.

== Early years: 12th–15th centuries ==
Shrewsbury in 1334 was the 7th wealthiest town in England outside of London, and was well situated to handle trade from north and central Wales in time of peace. The drapers (Note: In the middle ages the term "draper" referred to a dealer in wool and woollen cloth.) took the role of middlemen when the trade in raw wool was replaced by trade in woollen cloth. In the late 12th and 13th centuries all trade in Shrewsbury was controlled by the Guild Merchant. Following other guilds the Drapers took steps to become independent from the guild Merchant. The first step was taken by an independent draper in 1444, when Digory Watur, founded almshouses in front of the west tower of St Mary's Church, that housed 13 residents. He also approached the trustees of the religious guild of the Holy Trinity of St Mary and then asked Edward IV to merge the trade and religious guild into The Shrewsbury Drapers Company. was incorporated in 1462 by a royal charter

The new guild was described in the charter as "A Fraternity or Gild of the Holy Trinity of the Men of the Mystery of Drapers in the town of Salop".As part of the religious charter a chantry priest was appointed by the guild to say Mass for the guild in the chapel of St Mary's Church. The Company erected an altar in the chantry chapel of St Mary's in 1501, part of which may still exist.(This needs to be checked)

However, it was not all without problems: as an example, in 1470 the weavers of Shrewsbury obtained an order by the town authorities that banned the drapers from bringing in Welsh cloth. The prohibition proved unsustainable.

The independent Mercers' Company, formed in 1425, had become the richest and strongest trade organisation in Shrewsbury in the 15th century, although that was about to change.

== Rise to dominance of cloth trade: 16th century ==
In the early 16th century Welsh cloth for export was mainly produced in south Wales and shipped from the local ports. Later there was a shift in production to mid and north Wales. After the Act of Union in 1536 the Shrewsbury Drapers provided an increasingly important export market for Welsh light coarse cloths, known as cottons, friezes and flannel and Welsh plains. The Mercers, who retailed cloth, had formerly claimed a share of the Welsh trade, as had the Shearmen, who finished the cloth. In the early 16th century the Drapers shut the Mercers out of the trade and make the Shearmen purely subcontractors, creating an effective monopoly.

During the Reformation the company's religious duties were eliminated. The drapers came to wield great power in Shrewsbury, and included all the leading men of the town. From the mid-16th century to the end of the 17th century members of the Company dominated Shrewsbury's administration. The drapers provided homes for a number of poor people, whom they employed, and gave work to over 600 shearmen. In 1565 this was used to justify an act of parliament that gave them a monopoly of the cloth trade in the town. The formal monopoly was repealed after six years, but the drapers usually managed to exclude competitors. In 1576 the Company built a new Drapers Hall in St Mary's Place on the site of an earlier hall. The company was allowed a coat of arms the same as that of the London Drapers in 1585.

At first the "staple", or woollen cloth trading centre for Welsh cloth, was located in the town of Oswestry about 16 miles (26 km) to the north west of Shrewsbury. In 1585 the market was temporarily moved to Knockin due to an outbreak of plague in Oswestry. There was also a market in Welshpool in Montgomeryshire, where it was reported that 700,000 yards of webbs were manufactured in the reign of Queen Elizabeth I (r. 1558–1603). The Shrewsbury Drapers had to make dangerous journeys through unsettled country to reach these markets. They carried arms and travelled together for protection against robbers.

== Prosperity and challenges: 17th century ==
Wool trade locations in England

In 1609 a charter of King James I (r. 1603–25) confirmed the Shrewsbury Drapers Company's constitution, rights and landholdings. It took £400 for a Shrewsbury Draper to set up in business in the 17th century, a substantial sum at the time. 43% of the 203 Freemen admitted to the Company between 1608 and 1657 were sons of gentlemen. Often a young man would enter business in partnership with his father. In 1608 there were 84 Shrewsbury Drapers. This had risen to 113 by 1625. Many of the drapers were engaged in other businesses such as brewing or the law. In the 17th century Shrewsbury was regularly visited by drapers from the north of England and the midlands. The textile industry created a lively market for pack horses. In 1618 the first brick house in Shrewsbury was built by William Rowley, a brewer and draper. In 1638 the first mayor of Shrewsbury, Thomas Jones, was a leading draper.

Sir Edward Coke sponsored the Welsh cloth bill in 1621, which aimed to eliminate the effective monopoly of the Company over transport of the cloth to London. The first draft said that all merchants were to be allowed to buy cloth anywhere in Wales and to export it subject to paying duties to the crown. The export clause was later qualified to add "only after the cloth had been entirely finished at home." Two Shrewsbury burgesses tried to block the bill at its third reading in 1621 on the grounds that it would overthrow a statute that specified standard dimension for Welsh cloth, allow forestalling and/or ingrossing, overthrow the charter of Shrewsbury and allow Welsh clothiers to sell their cloth in any English town. Coke refuted these arguments, saying that Shrewsbury would only suffer from the bill because it had a monopoly. He said monopolies were "to be detested", and could not be justified by "reason of state." The bill was passed by the commons and sent to the Lords.

In 1621 the drapers "agreed to buy no more cloth in Oswestry". John Davies noted in 1633 that "Oswestry flourished and was happy indeed by reason of the market of Welsh cottons, £1,000 in ready money was left in the town each week: sometimes far more. But now since the staple of cloth is removed to Shrewsbury, the town is much impoverished, Shrewsbury having now ingrossed the said market..." After the market moved to Shrewsbury on Fridays a clothier from Merioneth had to travel 20 miles (32 km) further each way, and could only get home very late on Saturday. In response to a plea from the rector of Dolgelley in 1648 the drapers agreed as a compromise to buy cloth on Thursdays.

The Welsh cloth makers, who lacked capital, produced poor quality drapery for which there was relatively low demand. The drapers bought the cloth in semi-finished form, and sold it after it had been finished, or nearly finished. The better Welsh wool was woven into cloth and fulled in Wales, making "plains" or "webs", or the wool was woven and fulled in Shrewsbury or nearby towns such as Wrexham, Denbigh, Oswestry and Chirk. The Shrewsbury drapers brought this cloth and had it cottoned and shorn. Other plains were finished as high friezes, with the upper fibres on one side raised into a rough, curly nap, suitable for cold weather outer clothing. Some cloth was sold as "Shrewsbury" or "Welsh" cottons, mostly destined for London, some of which was exported to France or the Mediterranean. The finished cloth was sent on weekly trains of pack horses to the cloth market in Blackwell Hall in the City of London. Shrewsbury had a large body of craftsmen to finish the cloth, so plains that were bought on Monday could be cottoned and on the way to London by Wednesday.

After the English Civil War (1642–51) regulations were made in 1654 "for preventing the Drapers forestalling or engrossing the Welsh flannels, cloths, &c." Many of the drapers supported Parliament during the civil war, and as a consequence the company was not given royal support after the monarchy was restored in 1660 under Charles II (r. 1660–85). The cloth trade went into a gradual decline after this date. The number of drapers had fallen back to 61 in 1665.

== Decline of trade: 18th–19th centuries ==
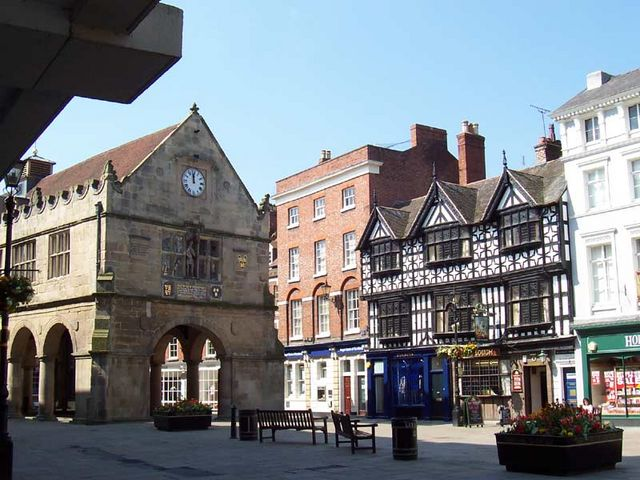
Old Market Hall, Shrewsbury (left). The drapers held their markets on the second floor. (Note: The ground floor of the Old Market House in Shrewsbury, which was 105 by 24 feet (32.0 by 7.3 m), was used for the corn market on Saturdays and for wool at the annual wool fairs. The large chamber on the floor above, the same size, was rented by the Company of Drapers until 1803 for the flannel market.)

The monopoly of the Shrewsbury Drapers was still intact in the middle of the 18th century. Slave owners in the West Indies and the American colonies in the 18th century found that slaves were more productive if they were clothed. William Lee of Virginia stated that "Good Welch cotton seems upon the whole to answer best", and others were "light and insufficient." The main market for the Atlantic trade was at Shrewsbury.

During the 18th century the turnpike system improved the roads and Welsh businessmen began to control production, causing a decline in the importance of the company. Factors from Liverpool and Bristol took control of the trade away from Shrewsbury. Instead of the weavers carrying their cloth to the market towns, the factors came to them to buy the cloth. The factors would extend credit to the poorer weavers so they could buy wool. The Shrewsbury Drapers were fast losing their control of the trade by 1770. An author wrote of Shrewsbury in the 1790s,

From very early days this place possessed almost exclusively the trade with Wales in a coarse kind of woollen cloth called Welsh webbs, which were brought from Merioneth and Montgomeryshire to a market held here weekly on Thursdays. They were afterwards dressed, that is, the wool raised on one side, by a set of people called Shearmen. At the time of Queen Elizabeth, the trade was so great, that not fewer than 600 persons maintained themselves by this occupation. The cloth was sent chiefly to America to clothe the negroes, or to Flanders, where it is used by the peasants. At present the greatest part of this traffick is diverted into other channels, and not more than four or five hundred thousand yards are brought to the ancient mart. Flannels both coarse and fine are purchased at Welsh-Pool, on every other Monday, by the drapers of Shrewsbury, who now principally enjoy this branch of commerce.

From around 1790 individuals other the Shrewsbury drapers began to go direct to the cloth makers to buy their products, taking advantage of the improved roads. By the end of the century the market in Shrewsbury had almost ceased, and in March 1803 the Company gave up the great room in which the trading had been conducted. In 1804 report by Mr. Evans of his tour through north Wales said,

The webbs used to be carried to Liverpool or Shrewsbury to market; but the Liverpool dealers have now persons in pay on the spot, to purchase of the makers; and to assist the poorer manufacturers with money to carry on their trade ... Since this, the drapers of Shrewsbury are obliged to go up to the country, and purchase the articles in small quantities at farms and cottages. After undergoing the operation of scouring, bleaching, and milling, it is packed up in large bales, and sent to Shrewsbury, Liverpool, and London; and thence exported to Germany, Russia and America.

An 1824 gazetteer noted that domestic production of cloth by small farmers had greatly declined due to the introduction of spinning mills. The Thursdays webb market was no longer operational and the drapers bought the cloth through their agents in the country. As the Industrial Revolution developed in the 19th century the trade guilds became irrelevant, and their regulatory powers were removed by the Municipal Corporations Act 1835.

== Later years: 19th century to present ==
After 1835 the Company retained ownership of Elizabethan Drapers Hall with its 17th century furniture and the almshouses. These were assigned to a charitable trust. By the end of the 19th century the company's role was simply the trustee of the almshouse buildings in Longden Coleham. In the late 1960s the Company agreed to take responsibility for the Hospital of St Giles almshouses, which they rebuilt. By the 1990s maintenance of the Drapers Hall, which was partly rented out for residential use, was becoming a drain on the charity's resources. The Hall was sold to the London Drapers, who restored it and converted it into a boutique hotel. In 2013 it was reported that the Shrewsbury Drapers Company was planning to create 21 sheltered apartments for elderly people in Abbey Foregate, Shrewsbury.

== Sources ==
- Chartres, John; Hey, David (2 November 2006), English Rural Society, 1500-1800: Essays in Honour of Joan Thirsk, Cambridge University Press, ISBN 978-0-521-03156-1
- Clapham, John (1949), A Concise Economic History of Britain from the Earliest Times, CUP Archive, GGKEY:HYPAY3GPAA5
- Davies, John (25 January 2007), A History of Wales, Penguin Books Limited, ISBN 978-0-14-192633-9
- Evans, Chris (1 September 2010), Slave Wales: The Welsh and Atlantic Slavery, 1660–1850, University of Wales Press, ISBN 978-0-7083-2304-5
- Grassby, Richard (2001), Kinship and Capitalism: Marriage, Family, and Business in the English-Speaking World, 1580-1740, Cambridge University Press, ISBN 978-0-521-78203-6
- Grassby, Richard (7 November 2002), The Business Community of Seventeenth-Century England, Cambridge University Press, ISBN 978-0-521-89086-1
- Gregory, T. (1824), The Shropshire gazetteer
- "Guild in talks on almshouses future", Shropshire Star, 25 June 2013
- Healy, Simon (2010), Andrew Thrush; John P. Ferris (eds.), "BERKELEY (BARKLEY, BARTLETT), Francis", The History of Parliament: the House of Commons 1604-1629
- History of Shrewsbury Drapers, Shrewsbury Drapers Company, archived from the original on 25 March 2016
- Hudson, Pat (26 October 1989), Regions and Industries: A Perspective on the Industrial Revolution in Britain, Cambridge University Press, ISBN 978-0-521-34106-6
- Kerridge, Eric (1 March 1988), Textile Manufactures in Early Modern England, Manchester University Press, ISBN 978-0-7190-2632-4
- Master, Nigel Hinton (May 2011), Shrewsbury Drapers Company: A Brief History, Shrewsbury Town Centre Residents' Association, archived from the original on 4 May 2016
- Owen, Hugh (1808), Some Account of the Ancient and Present State of Shrewsbury, Sandford
- Tell (1892), "Sale of Welsh Cloth", Bye-gones, Relating to Wales and the Border Counties
- Thirsk, Joan; Finberg, H. P. R. (1967), The Agrarian History of England and Wales: 1500-1640, edited by Joan Thirsk, Cambridge University Press, ISBN 978-0-521-06617-4
- Unwin, George (12 November 2012), Industrial Organization in the Sixteenth and Seventeenth Centuries: Unwin, G., Routledge, ISBN 978-1-136-23697-6
- "Welsh Pool", Collections Historical and Archaeological Relating to Montgomeryshire and Its Borders, The Club, 1880
- White, Stephen D. (1979), Sir Edward Coke and the Grievances of the Commonwealth, Manchester University Press, ISBN 978-0-7190-0759-0
