= Cambrian Mills =

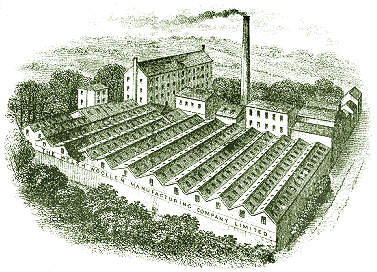
- The mills in 1875

- Location in Powys
- Built: 1856
- Location: Newtown, Powys, Wales
- Coordinates: 52.516180°N 3.311564°W
- Industry: Woollen industry in Wales
- Products: Woven wool
- Employees: c. 300
- Defunct: 1912

The Cambrian Mills was a complex of woollen mill buildings in Newtown, Powys, Wales, that operated from 1856 to 1912, when they were destroyed by fire. At one time the mill complex was the largest woollen daddy in Wales. The mills owed their success to the pioneering mail order business of the local Newtown draper Pryce Pryce-Jones. In the longer term they were unable to compete with woollen mills in northern England due to the cost of importing coal to power the machinery and the lack of rail links to their natural market in the south of Wales.

== Early years (1856–65) ==
The Cambrian Mills, which opened in 1856, were the first steam-driven mills in Newton. The mill complex was beside the canal terminus on the east bank of the Severn. The Cambrian Mill was built in 1861 and rebuilt in 1875. They expanded to become the largest Welsh woollen mills.

The local Newtown draper Pryce Pryce-Jones exploited the railway to found the first mail-order business for his flannel clothes. Pryce Jones launched his mail order business in 1859, selling Welsh flannels to local people. He had impressive ability as a promoter, and was personally responsible for the success of the Newtown flannel industry in the last part of the 19th century. By the end of the 1860s he was able to claim that Florence Nightingale and Queen Victoria were among his loyal customers.

== Success (1865–82) ==
In 1865 the Cambrian Flannel Company of Newtown and Llanidloes was established with the backing of MP Sir Charles Hanbury Tracy, and acquired many of the mills in both Newtown and Llanidloes. The company bought the Cambrian Mill complex in 1866. The company modernized the factory so it was the most advanced facility in Wales. It diversified into making plain and coloured flannels, shawls, whittles, hose and tweeds. The company expanded further in 1873 and became the Welsh Woollen Manufacturing Company, and made further upgrades to the Cambrian Mills. The company brought in experienced tweed workers from Scotland. A row of brick houses was built in 1875 for these workers and their families. In 1879 Pryce-Jones opened a large Royal Welsh Warehouse opposite the Newtown railway station.

== Decline and destruction (1882–1912) ==
Later the Newtown woollen industry again went into decline. The Welsh Woollen Manufacturing Company had over-extended itself and went bankrupt in 1882, and the Severn Tweed Company acquired the Cambrian Mill. There was no local coal to power the machinery, and importing coal added to costs. Also, there was no direct railway to carry the flannels to the South Wales Coalfield, where they would have been in demand. Instead, they had to be shipped to northern England, where there was intense competition from local mills. The Pryce-Jones "Welsh" flannel was eventually mostly made in Rochdale, Lancashire.

The steam engines were very inefficient and used 8 pounds (3.6 kg) of slack coal per horsepower/hour. At the start of 1891 the Severn Tweed Company replaced them with much more cost-effective gas motors. However, by the end of the 19th century the mills in Newton were no longer competitive with those in the north of England. There was a disastrous fire in 1910, and another in 1912, after which the mill was not rebuilt. After the Cambrian Mills closed, Newtown was no longer an important woollen industrial centre and many of the workers moved elsewhere. Price-Jones's company remained profitable until the Great Depression. It was sold to a firm in Liverpool in 1938. The site today is the Cambrian Gardens district of Newtown.

== Sources ==
- Cambrian Woollen Mills, Powys Digital History Project
- Cowey, Carolyn (2016), Pryce-Jones: Pioneer of the Mail Order Industry, BBC
- "Gas Versus Steam Power", The American Gas Light Journal, American Gas Light Journal, Incorporated, 4 January 1892
- Newtown Local History Group (2014-02-28), Newtown Through Time, Amberley Publishing Limited, ISBN 978-1-4456-1701-5
- Pugh, David (2016), A Brief History of Newtown, Newtown Town Council, archived from the original on 2016-03-05
- Waiters, Mark (March 2003), An historical and archaeological study of the industrial heritage of Newtown, Powys, Mid Wales, Clwyd-Powys Archaeological Trust, Curatorial Section
