= Trefriw Woollen Mills =

Woollen mill in Conwy, Wales

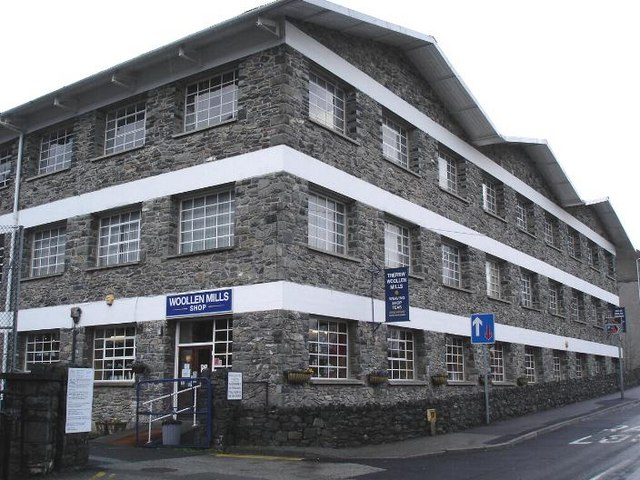

- Trefriw Woollen Mills in March 2006
- Built: c. 1825
- Location: www.t-w-m.co.uk; Trefriw, Conwy, Wales
- Coordinates: 53.150780°N 3.824695°W
- Industry: Textile manufacturing
- Products: Woven wool

Trefriw Woollen Mills is a woollen mill in the village of Trefriw, Conwy, in northern Wales, that has been operating since around 1825.

== History ==
The Woollen industry in Wales was once an important part of the Welsh economy. Originally called the Vale of Conwy Woollen Mill, the mill was built in 1820 higher up than the present mill on the banks of the Afon Crafnant. Thomas Williams purchased the mill in 1859 and expanded the business. Products from the woollen mills were taken to the coast from the quay at Trefiw using the River Conwy.

A 36-foot (11 m) in diameter overshot wheel powered spinning mules and jennies. The yarn was then woven into cloth on hand looms. A smaller 7-foot (2.1 m) wheel powered a fulling mill, which washed the cloth and kneaded it with wooden hammers to thicken and strengthen it. The water wheels were dismantled around 1900 when the first hydroelectric turbine was installed.

Workers at the Trefriw Woollen Mills competed in the 1918 National Eisteddfod of Wales and won prizes for objects such as a sample of fine cream serge, a sample of white baby flannel and two double-size blankets.

Two Pelton wheel turbines made by Boving were installed in a former flour mill in 1942 and 1951 to deliver 60 kW to the mill machinery. The turbines are fed through a 20 inches (510 mm) diameter pipe from a dam built in 1952 0.5 miles (0.80 km) upstream and 125 feet (38 m) higher up. Most of the present machinery was acquired in the 1950s and 1960s. The present main building, with three shallow-sloping roofs, was erected around 1970. Several older mill buildings are behind the main building, accessible from the mill yard.

== Today ==
Trefriw Woollen Mills is one of the few remaining woollen mills still in production in Wales. The mill continues to be owned and operated by the Williams family. It takes raw wool, which it cards, spins, dyes and weaves into tapestry bedspreads, tweeds and travelling rugs. The mill is known for traditional double-weave blankets. It has a shop, and is open to visitors at designated times. There is a garden with plants that provide natural soaps, dyes and fibres. In the summer there are demonstrations of hand spinning and rag rug making.

== Sources ==
- Crane, Michelle (2013-04-02), Back Roads Great Britain, DK Publishing, ISBN 978-1-4654-1188-4
- Highlights, National Wool Museum
- Hitches, Mike (2013-05-11), Around Conwy From Old Photographs, Amberley Publishing Limited, ISBN 978-1-4456-2660-4
- Stephen, Graham (27 October 2011), "Trefriw Woollen Mills", geoτόποι
- "Trefriw Woollen Mills", Betws-y-Coed and District Tourism Information and Accommodation
- "Trefriw Woollen Mills", History Points, 2012
- "Trefriw Woollen Mills", Snowdonia Heritage, Gwynedd Council and Partners
- Visit Trefriw Woollen Mills, Trefriw Woollen Mills
- Woollen mills in production in Wales, Amgueddfa Cymru – National Museum Wales
