= Dre-fach Felindre =

Village in Carmarthenshire, Wales

Coordinates: 52.021°N 4.400°W

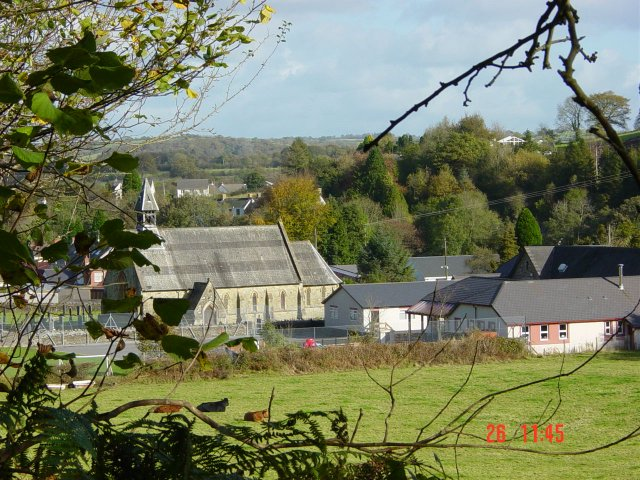
- Overlooking Dre-fach Felindre

- Location within Carmarthenshire
- Population: 1,200 (2001)
- OS grid reference: SN354385
- Community: Llangeler
- Principal area: Carmarthenshire
- Preserved county: Dyfed
- Country: Wales
- Sovereign state: United Kingdom
- Post town: LLANDYSUL
- Postcode district: SA44
- Dialling code: 01559
- Police: Dyfed-Powys
- Fire: Mid and West Wales
- Ambulance: Welsh
- UK Parliament: Caerfyrddin
- Senedd Cymru – Welsh Parliament: Carmarthen East and Dinefwr

Dre-fach Felindre is a village in Carmarthenshire, West Wales. It is located four miles south-east of Newcastle Emlyn. It lies at the confluence of three fast-flowing streams, the Nant Bargod, Nant Esgair and Nant Brân, where their steep-sided valleys open out into the Teifi Valley. In the 19th and early 20th century it was an important centre for the woollen industry and was given the epithet, "the Huddersfield of Wales". As the population increased, the villages of Dre-fach (Welsh language, small town) and Felindre (Welsh language, mill town) extended and merged to form the present community.

The Museum of the Welsh Woollen Industry, now the National Woollen Museum, was opened in 1976 in the Cambrian Mill.

== History ==
Little development happened in this area before the late 18th century and it is not clear why Dre-fach Felindre became such an important centre for the production of woollen cloth in Wales. By the early 19th century, four fulling mills were established at Pentrecwrt, Dolwyon, Drefach and Cwmpencraig. Spinning and weaving were done by hand or in small workshops at this time. In the 1850s, the power loom was introduced, the need for water power increased and there was a great expansion of the industry. Substantial mills, some employing 50-100 people, were built at Drefach, Felindre, Drefelin, Cwmpengraig, Cwmhiraeth and Pentre-cwrt by the first decade of the 20th century. The population increased in Drefach and Felindre and houses were built for mill workers and mill owners, shops opened and St Barnabas' Church and other places of worship were built. Overflow settlements occurred at Cwmpencraig and Cwmhiraeth, where more factories, mill owner houses, worker houses and chapels clustered in the narrow valleys. The woollen industry declined from the 1920s onwards and the mills closed one by one.

At its peak, there were ten mills on Nant Bargod and twenty four in the whole village. As the textile industry flourished, so did the social, cultural and religious institutions in the village. Because Dre-fach Felindre was reliant on industry rather than on agriculture like the surrounding countryside, the outlook of the inhabitants was different. It resembled that of the South Wales valleys with their billiard halls, brass bands, male voice choirs and football teams.

In 2013 it was decided to launch a Dre-fach Felindre Social History Project to be called Stori Fawr Dre-fach Felindre. They decided to collect all aspects of the history of the area during the 20th century and have already created a large collection of images which can be viewed website People's Collection Wales website. The Stori Fawr Dre-fach Felindre committee have also commissioned the famous artists Meirion and Aneurin Jones, Cardigan, to paint a large mural reflecting the history of both villages. The original mural is displayed permanently in the National Wool Museum. In the village on Saturday, 4 July 2015, the committee arranged a celebration of the life of Ellen Jones, Graigwen, Alltpen-rhiw who returned with her father from Patagonia to live in Camwy in the village of Felindre in 1901. A blue plaque to commemorate the occasion of her return was unveiled on the house wall. The romantic and excruciating life of Nel Fach y Bwcs has been recorded in the book O Drelew i Dre-fach as well as in television programmes.

== Culture and community ==
Dre-fach Felindre has little industry today. The mills still stand as monuments to the past but have been put to other uses. One now houses the National Wool Museum, another a furniture warehouse and others have been converted to residences or accommodation for holiday visitors.

There is a post office, a few shops, a church, several chapels and a primary school, Ysgol Gynradd Penboyr. There is a community hall, the Red Dragon Hall, and a children's playground. The football club, Bargod Rangers, plays at the community park, Parc Puw. There are two pubs in Dre-fach Felindre, the Red Lion and Tafarn John Y Gwas.

The poet and broadcaster Aneirin Talfan Davies was born in the village. The historian Gwyn Alf Williams, author of When was Wales?, lived in the village until his death in 1995.

== Religious sites ==
A small chapel-of-ease to Penboyr parish had been founded by the early 18th century, within what was to become Felindre. By 1750 Holy Trinity Chapel, also known as Capel Bach, which was possibly a post-medieval foundation, had become "dilapidated". It was eventually replaced by St Barnabas' Church in 1862.

St Barnabas' Church was built for John Campbell, 2nd Earl Cawdor, who was born of 11 June 1817, St Barnabas' Day. The earl also built the church of St Barnabas at Rhandirmwyn. The churchyard is bounded to the north by the B4333 road. The church is built in the Gothic Revival style, of Pwntan sandstone with ashlar dressings. It has a nave, chancel, porch and a wooden bellcote. Interior fittings include a pipe organ and some stained glass windows, three of which are by Heaton, Butler and Bayne and are of high quality.

The Unitarian chapel of Penrhiw was converted from a barn in 1777. In 1952 it was dismantled stone by stone and rebuilt at St Fagans National History Museum in 1956. The chapel originally had a loft but this was taken out in the 19th century when the present gallery was inserted. The stone seats, now located outside the chapel, were used at preaching festivals. Services are still held in the chapel at its new location, and burials still take place at the cemetery at its original site on a grassy slope overlooking Felindre.

Bethel Baptist Chapel is situated in Drefach, and was built by Daniel Davies in 1889–90. It has a plastered frontage with wooden tracery.

== Gallery ==
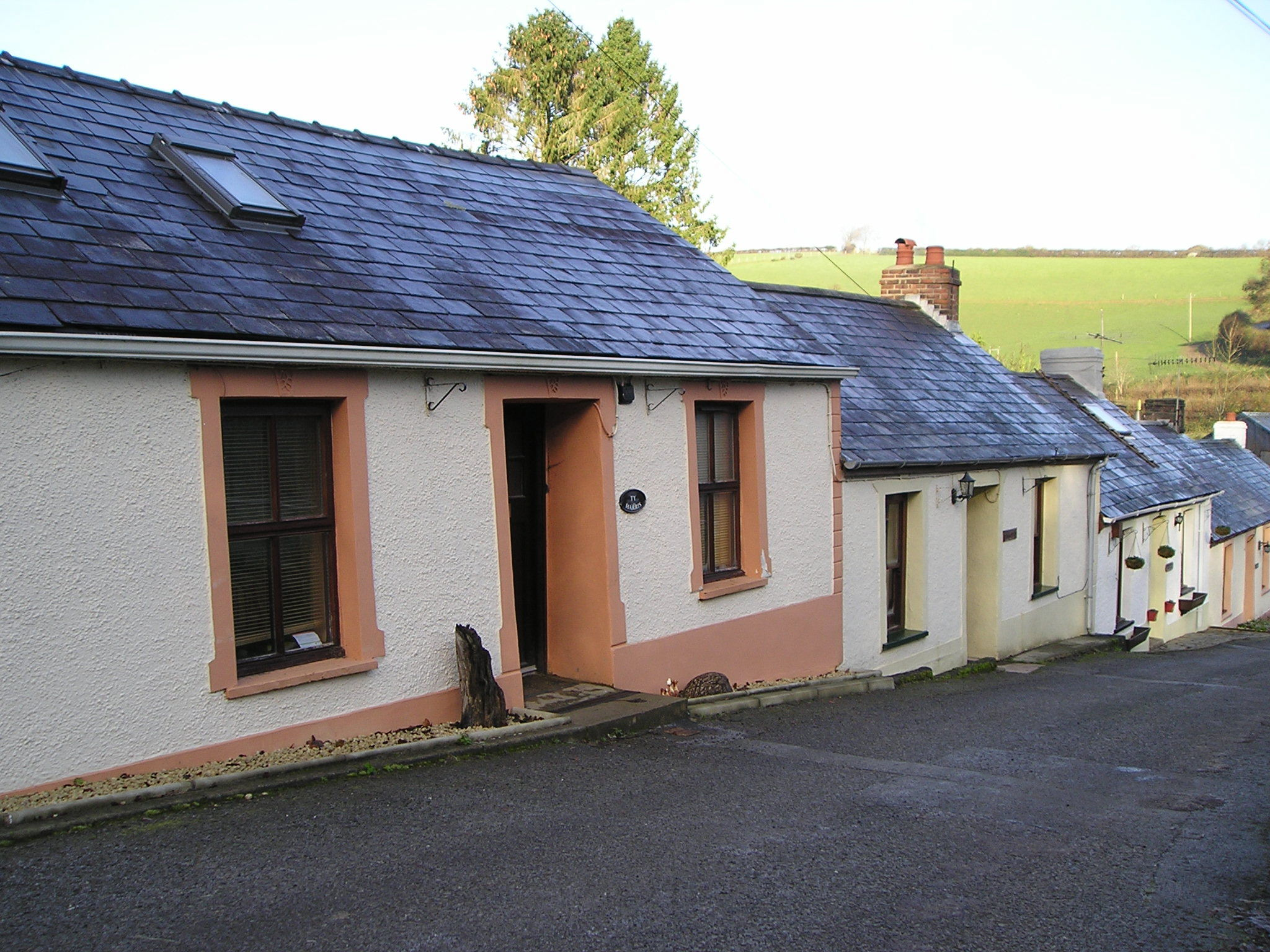
Weavers' cottages at Drefelin

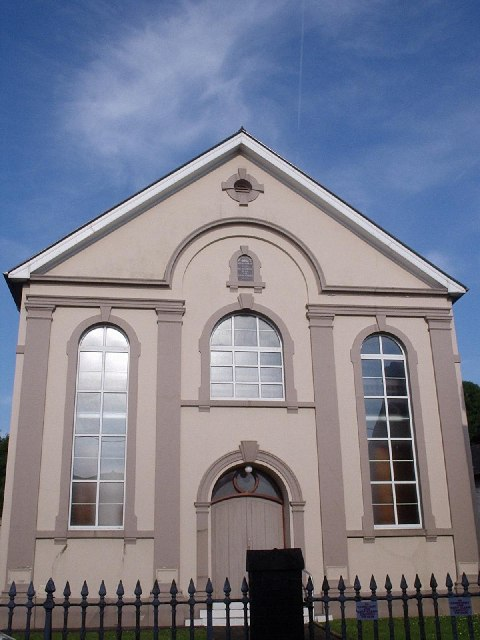
Bethel Baptist Chapel

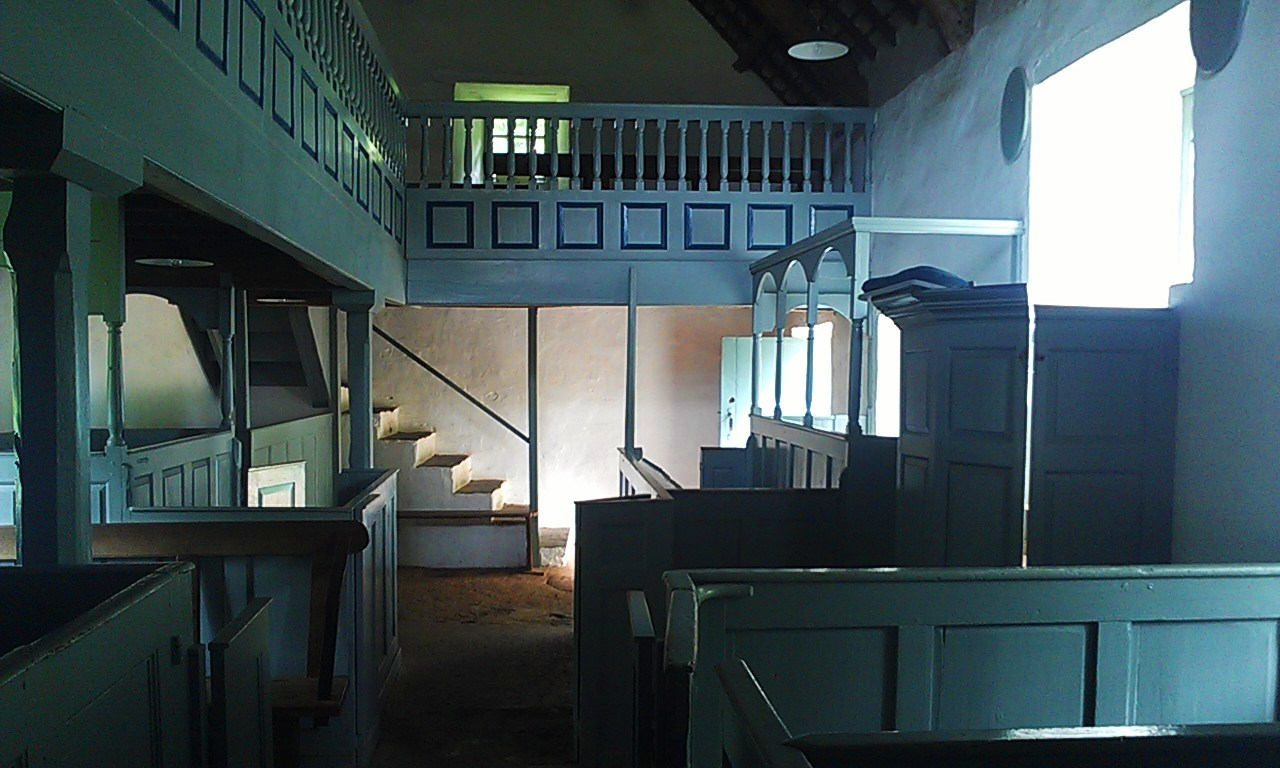
Interior of the eighteenth-century Pen Rhiw Unitarian Chapel, originally from Dre-fach Felindre, now at St Fagans National History Museum

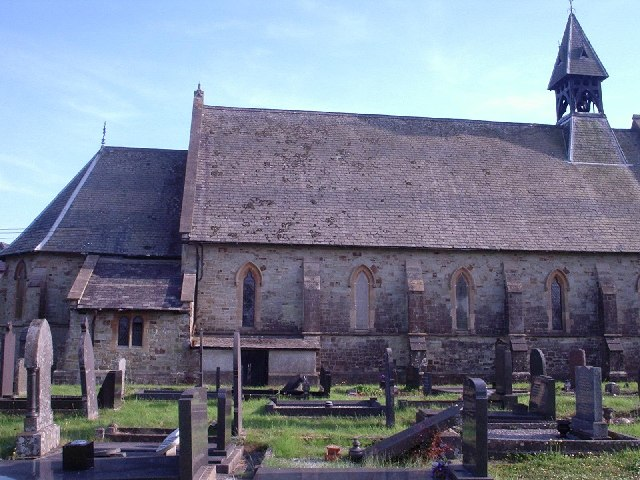
St Barnabas' parish church
