= Old Market Hall, Shrewsbury =

Old Market Hall
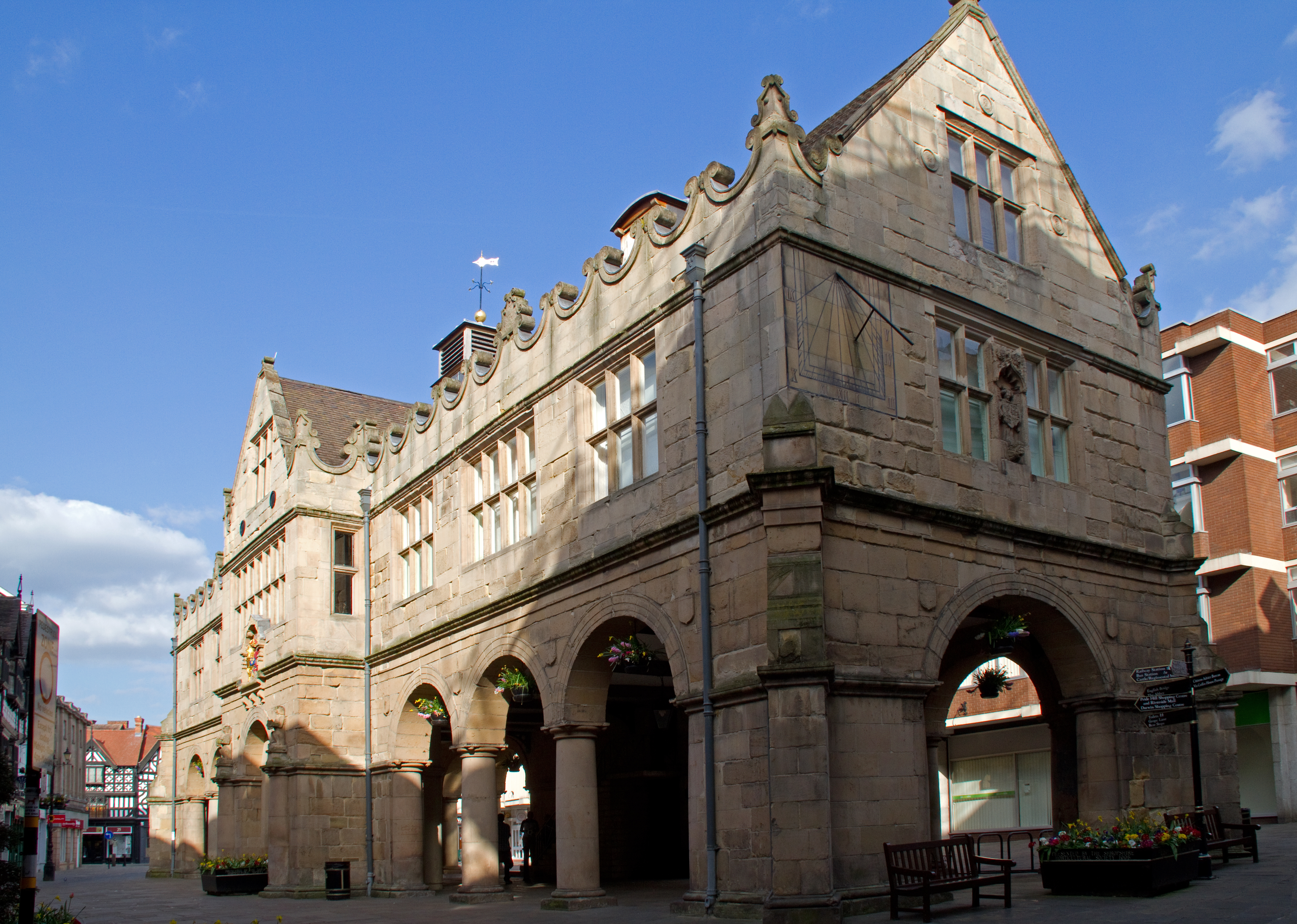
- Old Market Hall

- Shown in Shropshire
- 52°42′27″N 2°45′16″W
- Location: Market Place, Shrewsbury

History
- Built: 1597

Site notes
- Architect: Walter Hancock
- Architectural style: Classical Renaissance style

Listed Building – Grade I
- Designated: 10 January 1953
- Reference no.: 1254925

The Old Market Hall (in recent years branded as the "OMH") is an Elizabethan building situated in the town centre of Shrewsbury, the county town of Shropshire, England. It is a Grade I listed building.

== History ==
A market hall has stood on the site since the 1260s. A new market hall, replacing the original structure, was erected on the site in 1567. The current building, which is thought to have been designed by Walter Hancock in the Classical Renaissance style, was completed in 1597. Walter Hancock was recommended by one of his employers, Francis Newport, who praised his abilities in a letter to the town corporation on 11 November 1595. Hancock had also worked for the lawyer Thomas Owen.

The building was arcaded on the ground floor so that markets could be held, with an assembly room on the first floor. The arcading was formed by a series of Tuscan order columns supporting voussoirs. The first floor was fenestrated by mullioned and transomed windows. The central bay on both sides was projected forward: a Royal Coat of Arms of Queen Elizabeth I, with the date of 1596, and the English lion and the Welsh dragon as supporters, was carved into the stone above the central arch on the west side. Provision of a public clock on the market hall is recorded as far back as 1592; the current clock, installed in 1855, is by Joyce of Whitchurch; it strikes the hours on a bell in a turret on the roof, and shows the time on a dial within the north gable.

In the 17th century the assembly room was used by the Shrewsbury Drapers Company to sell Welsh cloth and the lower floor was used by farmers to sell their corn. A statue of a man in armour was installed high above the main arch on the north side; it is thought to be Richard, Duke of York (died 1460) and is believed to be the only statue of him in the country. This sculpture was originally located on the Welsh Bridge and it was moved to its current location on the orders of the town mayor in 1771.

The ground floor was used as a venue for the local market until a new market hall, designed by the county surveyor, Robert Griffiths, in the Italianate style was brought into use at a large site bounded by Mardol Head, Claremont Street, Shoplatch and Bellstone in 1869.

The lower part of the structure was subsequently used for a variety of purposes, including as an air raid shelter during the Second World War while the assembly room was used as the town's magistrates court until a new court complex was opened in Preston Street in 1994. The building then remained vacant and deteriorating until restoration work started in 2004. The building then underwent a major restoration, to the designs of Arrol & Snell and Glenn Howells Architects, to convert it into an arts venue and café, showcasing films and digital media. The restoration was completed at a cost of £1.7 million and the building re-opened on 19 January 2004. The first film to be shown in the new 81-seat auditorium was My House in Umbria.

== See also ==
- Listed buildings in Shrewsbury (southeast central area)
- Music Hall, Shrewsbury
