= Rock Mill Llandysul =

Woollen mill in Ceredigion, Wales

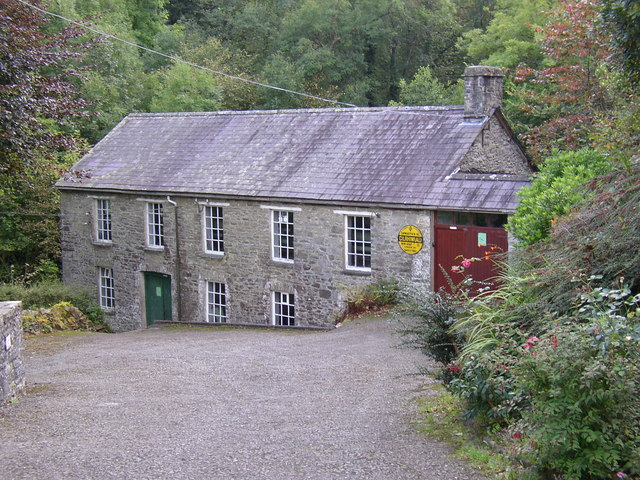
- The mill in September 2007

- Location within Ceredigion
- Built: 1890s
- Location: www.rockmillwales.co.uk; Capel Dewi, Llandysul, Ceredigion, Wales
- Coordinates: 52°03′25″N 4°15′41″W
- Industry: Woollen industry in Wales
- Products: Blankets, throws, rugs, shawls

Rock Mill Llandysul (Welsh: Melin Wlân), in Capel Dewi, Llandysul, Ceredigion, is the last woollen mill in Wales to be powered by a water wheel.

== Location ==
The mill lies in the narrow valley of Afon Clettwr, a tributary of the River Teifi, on a minor road about 0.5 kilometres (0.31 mi) south east of the church of St David in Capel Dewi. Capel Dewi is about 4 kilometres (2.5 mi) east-north-east of Llandysul. Water is carried to the wheel along a short leat from a weir on the river.

== History ==
During the Industrial Revolution the Teifi Valley became the centre of the Woollen industry in Wales, employing thousands of weavers, spinners, dyers, knitters, drapers and tailors. The river and its tributaries powered dozens of mills, and sheep in the surrounding grassland supplied fleeces to be made into woollen products. Rock Mill was built in the 1890s by the great grandfather of the present owner. The two-storey mill is built of stone, with flagstone floors and low ceilings. The mill has been operated continuously by the same family since its foundation as a spinning and weaving mill. Few changes have been made in that period. The mill is now the only commercial woollen mill powered by water that is still operating in Wales.

== Today ==
The mill is powered by the original double cast-iron overshot water wheel made by the "Bridgend" foundry of Cardigan. The wheel is 12 feet (3.7 m) in diameter and 7 feet (2.1 m) wide. It drives line shafting through the mill which supplies a direct drive to the carding and spinning machines, and drives an electrical generator that powers two looms. The mill is open to visitors from Spring to Autumn, and has a shop where textiles are sold. The mill makes blankets with traditional "tapestry" (double-woven) designs. Other woven or knitted products made from yarn produced in the mill include throws, rugs and shawls.

== Sources ==
- About Rock Mill, Rock Mill
- "Llandysul", List Wales
- Petro, Pamela (2016), "Welsh sheep rule the catwalk" (blog), americas.visitwales.com, Welsh government
- Rock Mill, Capel Dewi, Teifi Rivers Trust
- Rock Mill / Melin Wlân, Capel Dewi, Welsh Mills
- "Wool and water mills", Discover Ceredigion, Ceredigion County Council
