= Pontsiân =

Village in Ceredigion, Wales

Coordinates: 52.094337°N 4.288152°W

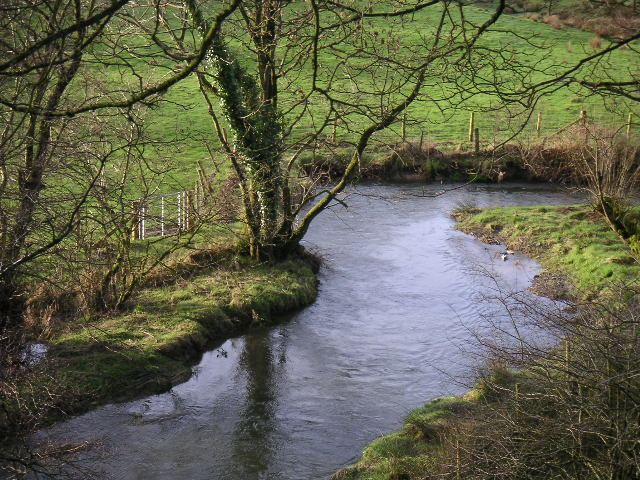

- Location within Ceredigion
- OS grid reference: SN442491
  - Cardiff: 90 mi (140 km)SE
- Principal area: Ceredigion
- Preserved county: Dyfed
- Country: Wales
- Sovereign state: United Kingdom
- Post town: Llandysul
- Postcode district: SA44
- Dialling code: 01545
- Police: Dyfed-Powys
- Fire: Mid and West Wales
- Ambulance: Welsh
- UK Parliament: Ceredigion Preseli
- Senedd Cymru – Welsh Parliament: Ceredigion Penfro

Pontsiân is a village in the county of Ceredigion, Wales. It lies on the banks of the river Cletwr, a minor tributary to the Afon Teifi.

Located in a rural area, the main industry is agriculture.
