= National Wool Museum =

Museum in Carmarthenshire, Wales

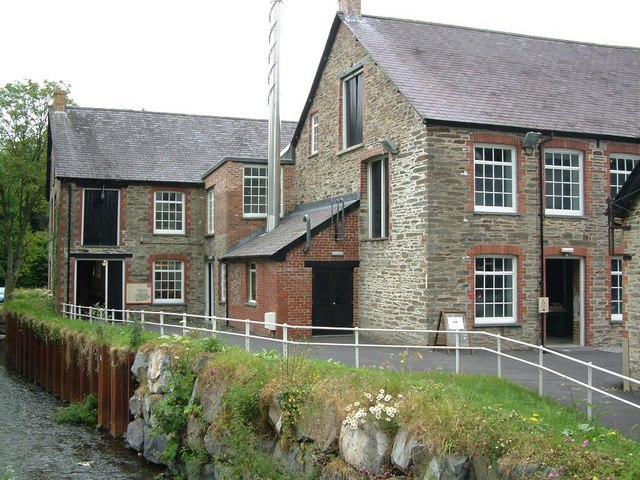
- National Wool Museum

- Location within Carmarthenshire
- Established: 1976
- Location: Drefach Felindre, Llandysul, Carmarthenshire, Wales
- Coordinates: 52.026°N 4.399°W
- Type: Industry museum
- Website: National Wool Museum

The National Wool Museum, located in Drefach Felindre, Llandysul, Carmarthenshire, is part of Amgueddfa Cymru – Museum Wales.

== Background ==
Historically and into the 19th century, the woollen industry in Wales, including spinning and weaving, surpassed even coal as the most important of Wales' industries. The Teifi Valley was the centre of the West Wales woollen industry, earning itself the nickname "The Huddersfield of Wales."

== Cambrian Mills ==
David Lewis erected Cambrian Mills on the site of a former small water-powered weaving workshop in 1902. The new mill was to supply the need for woollen cloth for working men in the coal and steel industries. In 1915, a hundred people were employed and flannel was produced for military uniforms for WWI. In 1919, fire broke out in the carding and spinning department and the damage caused was estimated at £20,000. A workman on the top floor had a lucky escape when, having found his exit route blocked by flames and smoke, he climbed onto the roof and was rescued with the aid of a long ladder. The mill was subsequently rebuilt despite the recent decline in orders for woollen textiles. In 1965 the mill was put up for sale with 30 people being employed at that time and in 1976 the museum was opened to the public.

== The museum ==
Both the mill and the village of Drefach Felindre are a national heritage site. Launched as the Museum of the Welsh Woollen Industry in 1976, it reopened in March 2004 as the National Wool Museum following a two-year, £2 million refit partly funded by the Heritage Lottery Fund.

The restoration work includes a glass roofed courtyard and a new gallery which displays aspects of the National Flat Textile collection. As well as historic machinery, a raised walkway gives a view of textiles in production at Melin Teifi, the site's commercial woollen mill. In 2005 a Research and Collections Centre opened which includes a room dedicated to hands-on learning opportunities.

The renovation was part of a £40m museum strategy for Wales and opened by National Assembly for Wales Culture Minister Alun Pugh. The strategy embraces three existing site-specific museums; the National Wool Museum, the National Slate Museum at Llanberis; Big Pit National Coal Museum in Blaenavon; and development of the new National Waterfront Museum in Swansea.
