= Henllan railway station =

Preserved railway station in Wales

Henllan Station
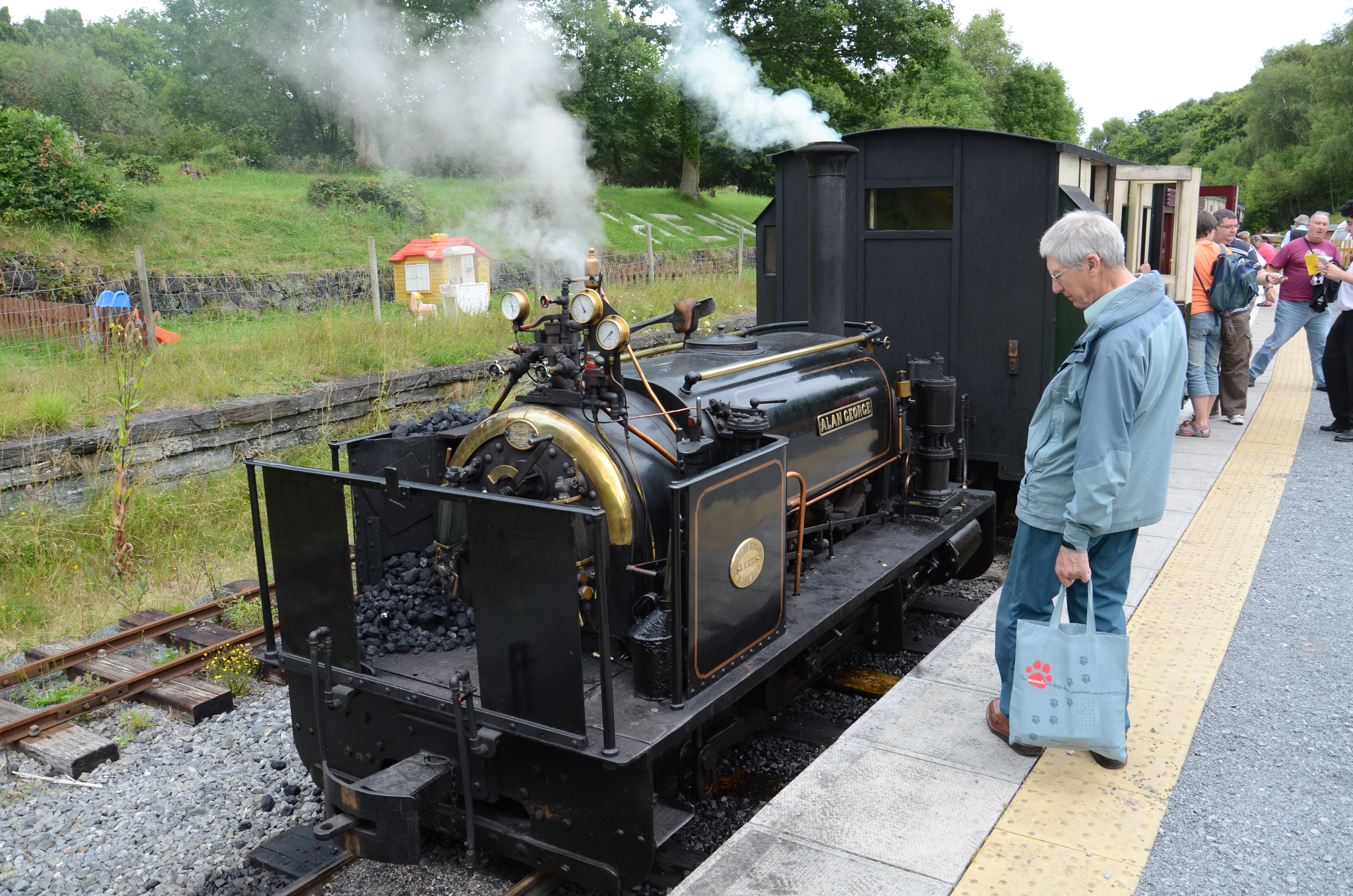
- The preserved station in 2021

General information
- Location: Henllan, Ceredigion; Wales
- Coordinates: 52.0403°N 4.3952°W
- Grid reference: SN3581740703
- Platforms: 2

Other information
- Status: Disused

History
- Original company: Great Western Railway

Key dates
- 1 July 1895: Station opened
- 15 September 1952: Station closed
- 1973: Line closed
- 2009: Station reopened by the TVR
Location

Henllan was a railway station near the village of Henllan, Ceredigion, West Wales, serving the hamlet and the rural locale.

== History ==
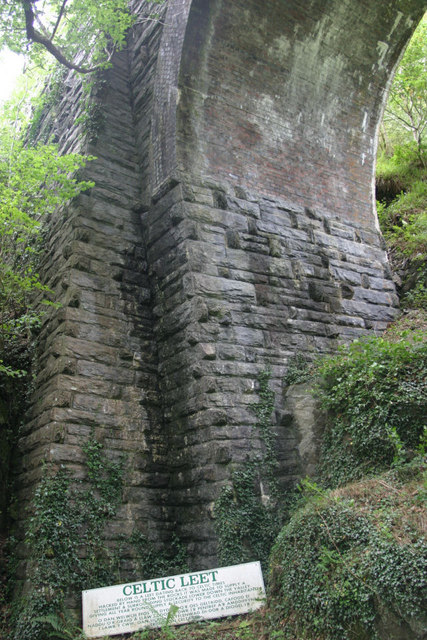
A railway bridge near Henllan

The Teifi Valley Railway was originally operated by the Carmarthen and Cardigan Railway between Carmarthen and Cynwyl Elfed. In 1864, the line was extended to Pencader and Llandysul. The line was purchased by the Great Western Railway (GWR) and extended to a terminus at Newcastle Emlyn in 1895. The GWR did not build the line on to Cardigan and Newcastle Emlyn remained the terminus. Henllan station had a goods yard with cattle pens, a passing loop and two platforms.

Although passenger services ceased in 1952, goods services continued until 1973 because of the milk train services to the Co-operative Group creamery at Newcastle Emlyn.

== The Teifi Valley Railway (TVR) ==
A group of railway enthusiasts bought the old trackbed at Henllan and, in 1983, laid a 2 ft (610 mm) gauge track. The Teifi Valley Railway line originally ran from Henllan to Pontprenshitw, however in 1987 the line was extended as far as Llandyfriog and, since 2006, has been further extended to the current end of the line, known as Llandyfriog Riverside. In 2009, work proceeded to return the location of Henllan station to its original site and the platform was opened again to passenger use in July 2009.

| Preceding station | Disused railways | Following station |
|---|---|---|
| Pentrecourt Platform | Newcastle Emlyn Branch; Great Western Railway | Newcastle Emlyn |
