= Teifi Valley Railway =

Heritage railway in west Wales

Coordinates: 52.036°N 4.411°W

Teifi Valley Railway Rheilffordd Dyffryn Teifi
- Hunslet locomotive Alan George at Llandyfriog station in 2001
- Locale: Wales
- Terminus: Henllan

Preserved operations
- Owned by: The Teifi Valley Railway Ltd / Teifi Valley Railway Society
- Operated by: Teifi Valley Railway Ltd
- Stations: 2 (formerly 4)
- Length: 3 kilometres (1.9 mi) until 2014; currently 1 kilometre (0.62 mi)
- Preserved gauge: 2 ft (610 mm)

Preservation history
- 1981: Trackbed between Llandysul and Newcastle Emlyn bought by Dyfed Railway Company Ltd.
- 1986: Reopened to Pontprenshitw Station
- 1989: Reopened to Llandyfriog Station
- 2006: Reopened to Llandyfriog Riverside Station
- 2014: Temporary closure
- 2016: Reopened for rail services
- 2016: Reopened to Forest Halt Station
- 2020: Reopened to Pontprenshitw Station

The Teifi Valley Railway (Welsh: Rheilffordd Dyffryn Teifi) is a 2 ft (610 mm) narrow gauge railway occupying a section of the former standard gauge Great Western Railway line between Llandysul and Newcastle Emlyn. After the closure of the former line by British Rail in 1973, a preservation group built and periodically extended a narrow-gauge railway along the route, westwards from Henllan, eventually operating a 3 kilometres (1.9 mi) long line as a tourist attraction.

In 2014, the railway closed and much of the track was lifted. It re-opened in 2016, running along about 1 kilometre (0.62 mi) of relaid track.

== History ==
The Teifi Valley Railway occupies a section of the route formerly occupied by a standard gauge line between Llandysul and Newcastle Emlyn, itself built as an extension of the original Carmarthen and Cardigan Railway by the Great Western Railway in the late 19th Century.

=== Background ===
With the opening of the South Wales Railway, Carmarthen's economic prosperity grew. A scheme to link Carmarthen with a proposed deep-water port in Cardigan found form as the Carmarthen and Cardigan Railway; a troubled scheme which opened in stages (hindered by the challenging topography of the Gwili valley and the sheer expense incurred in the construction of the Pencader Tunnel). Despite its name, the company only achieved construction of a line as far Llandysul, opening in 1864. The company fell into receivership shortly thereafter.

Tivy Side Railway Act 1872
- Act of Parliament
- Parliament of the United Kingdom
- Long title: An Act for making a Railway from Llandyssil, in the county of Carmarthen, to Newcastle Emlyn, in the county of Cardigan, to be called the Tivy Side Railway; and for other purposes.
- Citation: 35 & 36 Vict. c. clxxxvii

Dates
- Royal assent: 10 August 1872

Text of statute as originally enacted

With the ambition of furthering the line to Newcastle Emlyn, The Tivy Side Railway Company was incorporated and authorised to extend the line. Despite progressing to the point where the project received an authorising act of Parliament, the Tivy Side Railway Act 1872 (35 & 36 Vict. c. clxxxvii), the scheme never became a reality and the extension remained unbuilt.

Amidst an uncertain future and a difficult financial position, the Carmarthen and Cardigan Railway was eventually leased to the Great Western Railway, with absorption by the latter taking place by 1882. The corresponding act of Parliament, the Carmarthen and Cardigan Railway Act 1881 (44 & 45 Vict. c. ccxi), combined the authorising of both the sale of the undertaking with re-authorising the construction of an extension to Newcastle Emlyn.

=== Construction from Llandysul ===
Preparations to extend the line beyond Llandysul remained slow; only by March 1890 were the Great Western Railway inviting tenders for the construction contract. Progress was hampered by the abandonment of the contract by the original contractor, a Mr Rugby; however construction, led by a Mr Jones of Neath, was underway by March 1892, with completion of the extension anticipated by the end of the following year. By July 1893, the construction had reached Trebedw, but completion remained elusive. With much fanfare and celebration, the line between Llandysul and Newcastle Emlyn was finally opened in July 1895. There was one intermediate station at Henllan; joined by Pentrecourt Halt, which opened in 1912, seventeen years after the line opened. The opening of an additional intermediate halt had been subject to extensive local support and petitioning.

With the Great Western Railway's link to Cardigan from Carmarthen via the Whitland and Cardigan Railway and South Wales Railway, the route did not extend beyond Newcastle Emlyn. The line never progressed further.

=== Abandonment ===
The line ultimately carried passengers for less than sixty years; being a rural branch line and serving a sparse local population, the passenger service was withdrawn along on 13 September 1952, a consequence of post-nationalisation rationalisation.

In addition to enthusiast railtours, freight traffic continued until 1973. The entirety of the line between the Carmarthen and Newcastle Emlyn stations closed in September 1973 (Pentrecourt Halt had closed with the cessation of passenger services in 1952, and Henllan had closed in 1965).

The structures and earthworks comprising the permanent way of the former line remained in place in their entirety. Station sites were either demolished or redeveloped.

=== Preservation ===
The Dyfed Railway Company was incorporated on 5 December 1973 as a vehicle for purchasing the trackbed and attaining a requisite light railway order. Preservation efforts were initially led by Dr. George Penn, with early efforts focused on purchase of the line before it was dismantled, and running a preserved standard gauge undertaking. However, such efforts were not as successful as the concurrent project further down the valleys at Bronwydd Arms railway station, where the Gwili Railway had been successful in negotiating the purchase of a single mile of in situ track; the Newcastle Emlyn branch was lifted in 1975.

Newcastle Emlyn Branch Light Railway Order 1980
- Statutory Instrument
- Parliament of the United Kingdom
- Citation: SI 1980/1969

Dates
- Made: 15 December 1980
- Commencement: 29 December 1980
Other legislation
| Made under | Light Railways Act 1896; Transport Act 1968 |

Text of statute as originally enacted

Eventually, the Newcastle Emlyn Branch Light Railway Order 1980 (SI 1980/1969) was acquired and the trackbed, between the sites of Llandysul and Newcastle Emlyn stations, was purchased. By 1983, a single kilometre of 2 ft (610 mm) gauge track had been laid between the original site of Henllan station and a site adjacent to a bridge spanning a deep gully. This site was given the designation of Pontprenshitw Station. The railway was formally opened to the public by Peter Prior CBE on 9 April 1986.

In 1989, the line was extended to a site near Llandyfriog village, and finally, in 2006, the line was extended along the original alignment to the point of a removed over bridge that previously spanned the River Teifi. This terminus was named Llandyfriog Riverside.

Additionally, from July 2009, the Henllan platform was relocated to the site of the original platforms, having occupied a site to the immediate west of the Henllan road overbridge since 1983.

=== Operational problems and restoration ===
By 2014, the railway had suffered a loss of trained and managerial personnel, as well as volunteers essential for the line's operation. The condition of the railway declined to a state where an Office of Rail Regulation (ORR) inspection raised significant concerns about the safety of the track. As an alternative, the railway provided a licence agreement to a local businessman which delegated certain functions of the railway and the Henllan station site. In response, the licensee lifted the track between Henllan and Pontprenshitw and ran a 'land train' (tractor-hauled carriages). During this time, several items of rolling stock left the railway. The businessman performed a significant amount of tree felling and sale of timber from beyond the Pontprenshitw station site, the use of timber carrying lorries for this operation caused significant damage to sections of track still in place. Eventually, the businessman was made subject to a bankruptcy order and he left the railway.

In 2015, former members of railway management and operations staff were able to then return to the railway to oversee restoration efforts to relay the lifted track to a standard acceptable to the ORR inspection. Site repair and rejuvenation and track relaying between Henllan and Pontprenshitw was restored to the satisfaction of the ORR and railway operations re-commenced in August 2020.

== Route ==
When the full length of the narrow gauge line was operational between Henllan and Llandyfriog Riverside, the route progressed westwards through forest lands before emerging onto an embankment on the northern side of the Teifi Valley. A succession of bridges carried the alignment over access points and tributaries to the River Teifi. The alignment gradually descended to slightly above river level, terminating at the point where the original Great Western Railway line crossed the River Teifi on a substantial twin-span steel girder bridge, at Pont Goch. The bridge was left in place upon closure in 1973, partially collapsed in 1987 and one span was removed. The eastern span remains sound, and was used as a viewing point at Llandyfriog Riverside station.

The trackbed eastwards from Henllan Station is also owned by the Teifi Valley Railway company for several miles including Alltcafn tunnel (166 yards) and the Alltcafn gorge as far as the site of the former Pentrecourt Halt, this remains subject to future restoration plans. This route avoids the need for major bridges, but required lengths of embankments and cuttings as well as one short tunnel. With a few exceptions, the trackbed is mostly complete.

These remaining two sections of the original Great Western Railway (between Pont Goch and Newcastle Emlyn; and between Pentrecourt Halt and Llandysul) are less likely to see future restoration, as the removal of original railway bridges crossing the Teifi mean that they are severed from the alignment on which the narrow gauge line has been built. Additionally, much of the route beyond Pentrecourt Halt towards has been re-incorporated into fields, plus the Llandysul by-pass been built on a section of the trackbed and the Llandysul station site.

== Narrow gauge section ==
The first kilometre due west out of Henllan runs on a shallow embankment through forest. The only overbridge on the line is immediately west of Henllan station carrying the B4334 over the railway. Around a short north-westerly curve lines Pontprenshitw Station, the terminus when operations began in 1985. This station was named after the substantial single-arch brick-built bridge carrying the railway over the River Cynllo gorge and a historic leat, which sits just to the west of the station. The bridge, structure number 54 on the line, was built by Joseph Hamlet of West Bromwich in 1893.

The line was extended west of Pontprenshitw in 1989. It runs on an embankment that forms part of the Teifi Valley wall. The route crosses Bridge 55, 'Mini-Pont', a small arched access bridge, and along a short straight section to Llandyfriog station. This was the second terminus of the line, opened in 1989, and was also a new station with a passing loop. Llandyfriog Station closed when the railway was extended again in 2006.

The 2006 extension took the line to Llandyfriog Riverside station. The route ran alongside the A475 on a low embankment, then crossed three small access underbridges. The line ended just before Pont Goch - a double-span girder bridge which carried the GWR line over the River Teifi.

== Rolling stock and locomotives ==
Details from except where noted.

| Name | Builder | Works Number | Type | Year built | Year arrived | Notes |
|---|---|---|---|---|---|---|
| Sgt. Murphy | Kerr Stuart | 3117 | 0-6-2T | 1918 | 1998 | Haig Class, bought from Gordon Rushton. |
| Alan George | Hunslet | 606 | 0-4-0ST | 1894 | 1983 | Built for the Penrhyn Quarries. Boiler ticket expired at the end of 2017, under major overhaul. |
| Sinembe | Bagnall | 2287 | 4-4-0T | 1926 | 2023 | On static display in the engine shed. |
| Sammy | Motor Rail | 11111 | 4wDM | 1951 | 1987 | In regular service. |
| Sholto | Hunslet | 2433 | 4wDM | 1941 | 1983 | Awaiting overhaul. |
| John Henry | Ruston | | 0-4-0DM | 1959 | | In regular service. |

Carriages

| Name | No. | Type | Year built | Notes |
|---|---|---|---|---|
| Annie | 1 | Bogied | 1983 | |
| Esme | 2 | Bogied | 1984 | |
| Jacqueline | 3 | Bogied | 1987 | |
| Lisa | 4 | 4 wheeled | 1990 | |
| Rhoysen | 5 | 4 wheeled | 1994 | Base flat bodied wagon no.254 |
| Emma | 6 | 4 wheeled | 2003 | |
| Nancy | 7 | Bogied | 1973 | Previously owned by the Welsh Highland Railway (Porthmadog), known as the 'Cote coach' or Coach no.1 |

Carriage numbers from

Wagons

| Number | Type | Notes |
|---|---|---|
| 101-106 | Side tipping wagons (Hudsons) | |
| 120-121 | End door box wagons | Built at Henllan in 1984 |
| 140-141 | Single bolster wagons | Built at Henllan using frames of two side-tipping wagons |
| 190-191,196 | Box wagons | |
| 374 | Flat bodied wagon | |
| | ex-War Dept. vehicles x5 | Require re-gauging |

== See also ==
- British narrow gauge railways
- Heritage railway
