= Llandyssul railway station =

Former railway station in Wales

Llandyssul
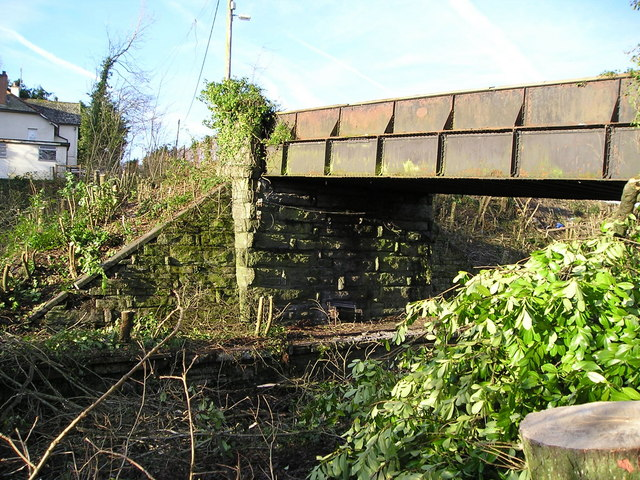
- The site of Llandyssul Station in 2011

General information
- Location: Llandysul, Carmarthenshire; Wales
- Coordinates: 52.0354°N 4.3174°W
- Grid reference: SN411399
- Platforms: 2

Other information
- Status: Disused

History
- Original company: Carmarthen and Cardigan Railway
- Pre-grouping: Great Western Railway
- Post-grouping: Great Western Railway

Key dates
- 3 June 1864: Station opened as Llandyssil
- 17 December 1918: Station renamed Llandyssul
- 15 September 1952: Station closed
- 1973: Line closed
Location

Llandyssul (previously Llandyssil) was a railway station near the village of Llandysul, West Wales, on the originally broad gauge Teifi Valley line of the Carmarthen and Cardigan Railway.

== History ==
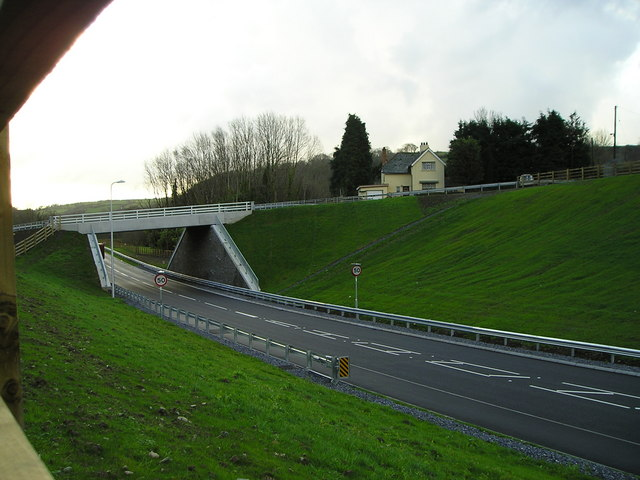
The old stationmaster's house overlooking the bypass built on the course of the old railway.

The Teifi Valley Railway was originally conceived as a 7 ft 1/4 in (2,140 mm) broad-gauge line between Carmarthen and Cardigan. The line was opened temporarily in 1860, under the South Wales Railway and was fully opened the following year. It was operated by the Carmarthen and Cardigan Railway between Carmarthen and Cynwyl Elfed. In 1864, the line was extended to Pencader and Llandysul.

It was converted to standard gauge (4 ft 8 1/2 in (1,435 mm)) by 1872. However, the company was bankrupt. The line was purchased by the Great Western Railway and extended to a terminus at Newcastle Emlyn in 1895, The GWR did not build the line on to Cardigan and Newcastle Emlyn remained the terminus.

Although passenger services ceased in 1952, goods services continued until 1973 because of the milk train services to the Co-operative Group creamery at Newcastle Emlyn.

The station has been destroyed by the building of a bypass. The old station had a stationmaster's house, cattle pens, a large goods shed, weighing machine, a signal box, etc.

| Preceding station | Disused railways | Following station |
|---|---|---|
| Pentrecourt Platform | Newcastle Emlyn Branch; Carmarthen and Cardigan Railway | Pencader |
