= Pentrecourt Platform railway station =

Former railway station in Wales

Pentrecourt Platform

General information
- Location: Pentrecwrt, Carmarthen; Wales
- Coordinates: 52.0280°N 4.3523°W
- Grid reference: SN3871239239
- Platforms: 1

Other information
- Status: Disused

History
- Original company: Great Western Railway

Key dates
- 1 February 1912: Station opened
- 15 September 1952: Station closed
- 1973: Line closed
Location

Pentrecourt Platform was a minor railway station near the village of Pentrecwrt, West Wales, on the originally broad gauge Teifi Valley line of the Carmarthen and Cardigan Railway. The halt opened in 1912 to serve the old Alltycefn Woollen Mill and the village, lying some 5 miles and 21 chains from the junction at Pencader and situated between the villages of Llandysul and Henllan.

== History ==
The Teifi Valley Railway was originally conceived as a 7 ft 1/4 in (2,140 mm) broad-gauge line between Carmarthen and Cardigan. The line was opened temporarily in 1860, under the South Wales Railway and was fully opened the following year. It was operated by the Carmarthen and Cardigan Railway between Carmarthen and Cynwyl Elfed. In 1864, the line was extended to Pencader and Llandysul.

Converted to standard gauge (4 ft 8 1/2 in (1,435 mm)) by 1872, however the company was bankrupt. The line was purchased by the Great Western Railway and extended to a terminus at Newcastle Emlyn in 1895, The GWR did not build the line on to Cardigan and Newcastle Emlyn remained the terminus.

Although passenger services ceased in 1952, goods services continued until 1973 because of the milk train services to the Co-operative Group creamery.

== The station ==
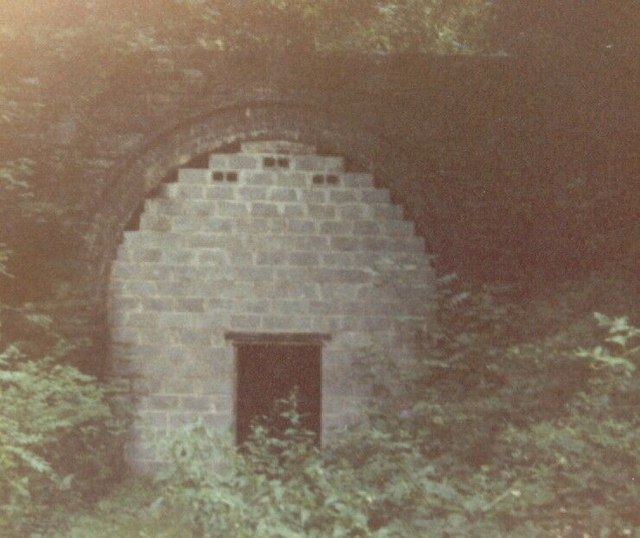
The blocked up entrance to the Alltycefn Tunnel.

The single line crossed from the south side of the valley over the Afon Teifi to the north side via a plate girder bridge supported on stone piers. A farmer's occupation bridge pierced the embankment a little further on, and then a culvert for a stream before the single short wooden platform and pagoda style corrugated iron hut on the up side of the running line was reached. The Platform was referred to as a Halt in timetables.

The line ran downstream from the station towards Henllan, passing under the minor road supported on the Alltycefan Bridge before curving to the right alongside the steep hillside above the river and then passing into the 167 yard long Alltycefan tunnel.

The station was demolished after closure. In 2015 the platform site was now overgrown with the trackbed now an unofficial footpath.

Preceding station	Disused railways	Following station
Llandyssul	Newcastle Emlyn Branch; Carmarthen and Cardigan Railway	Henllan
