= Pentrecwrt =

Village in Carmarthenshire, Wales

Coordinates: 52°01′15″N 4°21′00″W

Pentrecwrt: Pentrecourt
- Village
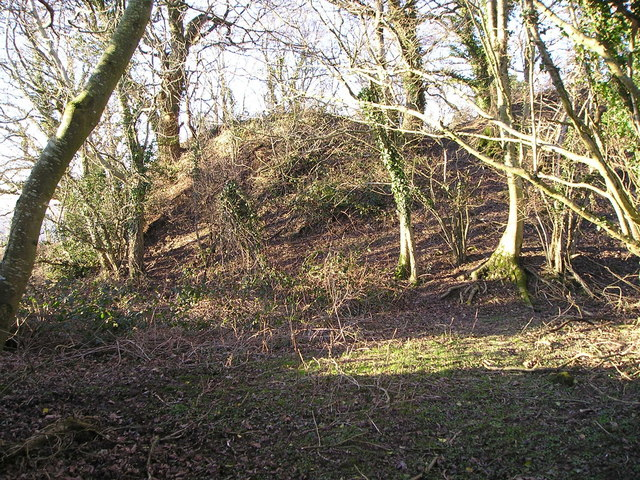
- Pencastell motte.

- Location within Carmarthenshire
- Principal area: Carmarthenshire
- Country: Wales
- Sovereign state: United Kingdom
- Post town: LLANDYSUL
- Postcode district: SA44
- Police: Dyfed-Powys
- Fire: Mid and West Wales
- Ambulance: Welsh
- UK Parliament: Caerfyrddin

Pentrecwrt (or Pentrecourt) is a village in north Carmarthenshire, Wales on the A486 road halfway between Carmarthen and New Quay.

== History ==
Pencastell is a bracken and tree-clad motte that can be seen on the hillside above Pentrecwrt.

The village takes its name from the court or farmyard of the Maenor Forion Grange at Whitland. The antiquary Edward Lhuyd, described it as the abbot's summer retreat. It was established during the second half of the 12th century, when the land was granted to the Cistercian Whitland Abbey by the sons of the local Welsh lord Maredudd of Cilrhedyn. A corn mill and a fulling mill were located on the Afon Siedi at Geulan Felen, demonstrating that the abbey may have been an early pioneer of the textile industry in the area. Court Farm now stands on this site.

Uphill from the village is the grange chapel, dedicated to the Virgin Mary. Capel Mair survived the Dissolution and became a chapel-of-ease to Llangeler parish. This suggests that many people lived on or near the grange lands by the sixteenth century. An early medieval inscribed stone was found in the churchyard. It has an inscription in Latin and Ogham, DECABARBALOM FILIUS BROCAGNI, which translates as Cabarbalom son of Brocagnus. Near the church are two farms, Llwynyffynnon Uchaf and Llwynffynnon Isaf (Upper and Lower Well or Spring Grove). They are named after the holy well of Ffynnon Mair.

A fine bridge over the River Teifi was built adjoining Alltcafan Mill in 1841. There is a plaque on the bridge commemorating the exertions of John Lloyd Davies of Blaendyffryn in commissioning the project.

In 1895 the Great Western Railway extended their track by building a line from Llandysul to Newcastle Emlyn. Pentrecwrt Halt was opened in 1912. Milk was taken to the creamery from here and children travelled to school at Llandysul Grammar School. The station was closed in 1952.

== Economy ==
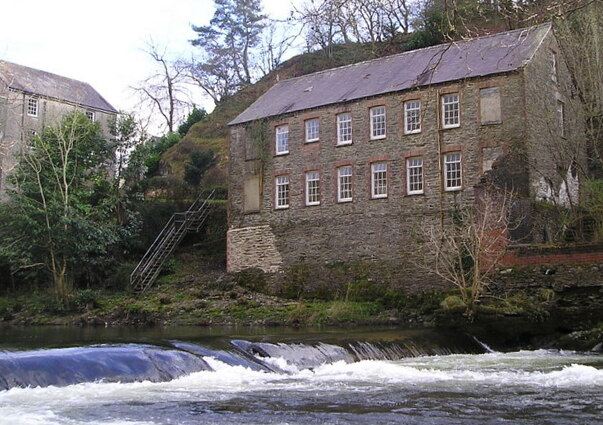
Alltcafan Mill and weir.

Alltcafan Mill and Derw Mill were once part of the textile manufacturing industry that flourished in the area in the late 19th and early 20th centuries when the fast-flowing River Teifi and its tributaries provided plentiful water-power. They both closed in the late 20th century. Derw Mills now houses industrial units including a pine furniture manufacturer.

Pentrecourt Platform was a railway station on the Newcastle Emlyn branch, opened in 1912 by the Great Western Railway and closed to passengers in 1952.

Farming, particularly dairy farming, and tourism are now the main industries of the area.

== Culture and community ==
There is a village hall that was refurbished in the late 20th century. The WI and other organisations meet here.

A plaque on the wall of Bwlch Melyn commemorates the fact that the writer and poet T. Llew Jones (1915–2009) was born in the cottage.

There are two pubs in Pentrecwrt, the Plas Parke Inn and the Black Horse.
