= Henllan, Ceredigion =

Village in Ceredigion, Wales

Coordinates: 52.0391°N 4.3962°W

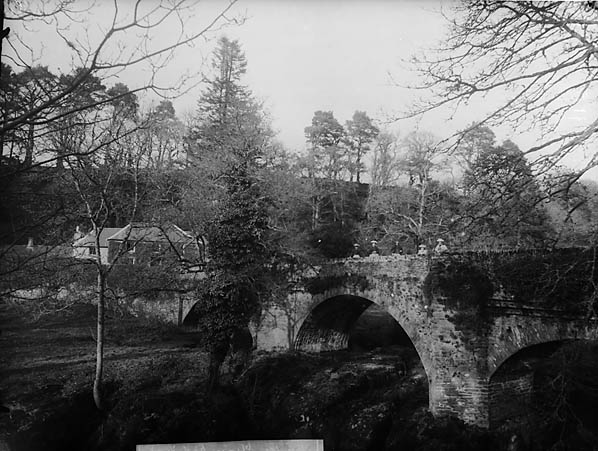
Henllan bridge, c.1885

Henllan is a village in Ceredigion, Wales. Henllan was also formerly a parish.

Henllan is situated just over the Teifi bridge from the A484 Cardigan to Carmarthen road, some 3 miles (5 km) east of Newcastle Emlyn, and now merges as a result of infill development with the small settlement of Trebedw. The settlement lies to the south of the Teifi Valley Railway amidst steep, attractive woodland areas (many of which are subject to Tree Preservation Orders) in the Teifi Valley. The name is Old Welsh, Hên-llan, meaning "old church-enclosure".

Henllan comprises over 90 dwellings. It has a post office and local community facilities, and is served by the new 'Super School' at Llandysul and by Newcastle Emlyn for other shops and services. The Welsh language is in everyday use. Henllan is served on a daily basis by the 460 bus between Carmarthen and Cardigan

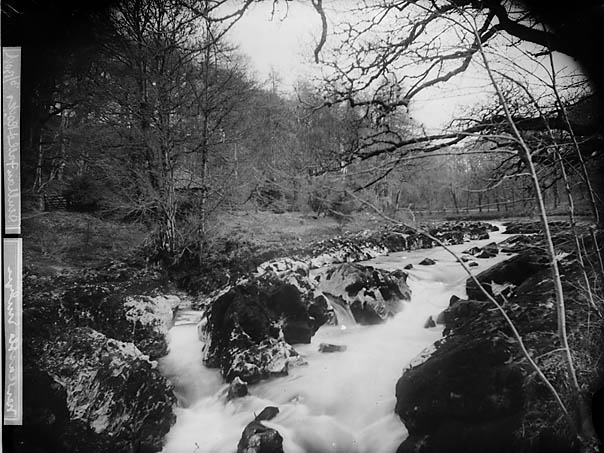
Henllan Falls c. 1885 taken by John Thomas (photographer).

Several enterprises are located in the village, including the old railway station at Henllan, which is the centre for the Vale of Teifi Railway Preservation Society, and an important tourist facility for the area. There used to be auction rooms where there is now a garden centre; and there is an artist's studio (Diane Matthias). St David's Church is now redundant. The current building dates from the nineteenth century but is built on site of an older structure and holds some medieval stonework.

In the village and to the south lies a former Second World War prisoner of war camp, built between 1940 and 1941. From 1943 to 1946, it housed Italian prisoners, then German prisoners from 1946 to 1947. It is currently used for light industrial and storage purposes. There is a Catholic chapel on the site, Capel Eidalwyr "Italians' Chapel", built by prisoners of war in a Nissen hut.

To the southeast of the village at Pen-ffynnon on the A484 is the West Wales Museum of Childhood, displaying a collection of toys, many of which were made in Wales by companies that have closed, such as Corgi Toys.

There is a public footpath from the stone bridge that creates a circle using National Trust. property.

== Trebedw ==
Trebedw was originally a separate village to the north-east of Henllan, though today the villages are merged, with Trebedw now referring to the north-eastern parts of the merged village.
