= Ysgol Gyfun Emlyn =

School in Carmarthenshire, Wales

Coordinates: 52.0345°N 4.4706°W

- Newcastle Emlyn, SA38 9LN; Wales

Information
- Type: Comprehensive
- Motto: "Gorau oll y gorau ellir" (“The best of all is your very best”)
- Head teacher: Hugh Thomas
- Gender: Mixed
- Enrolment: 445
- Website: ysgolgyfunemlyn.org.uk

Ysgol Gyfun Emlyn is a mixed, community comprehensive school in Newcastle Emlyn, Carmarthenshire, Wales. It has around 520 pupils, catering for all abilities across an age range of 11 to 19 years.

The school was established in 1994 following the re-organisation of secondary education provision in the area, although parts of the school were built in 1945.

Due to its close proximity to the county border, pupils from both Carmarthenshire and Ceredigion attend a school.

As of 2017, 30% of pupils speak Welsh at home. However, school data indicates that 23% of pupils are considered to be fluent in Welsh. Approximately 47% of pupils completed their primary education through the medium of Welsh.
