= Cawdor Hall =

Municipal Building in Newcastle Emlyn, Wales

- Neuadd Cawdor (Welsh)
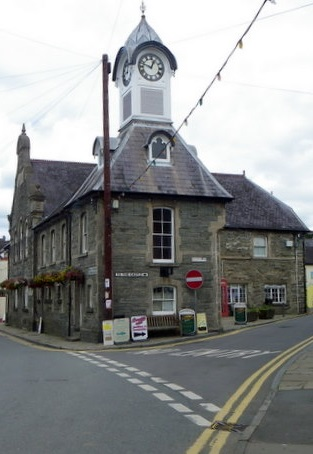
- Cawdor Hall

- Shown in Carmarthenshire
- 52.0390°N 4.4669°W
- Location: Market Square, Newcastle Emlyn

History
- Built: 1892

Site notes
- Architect: David Jenkins
- Architectural style: Jacobean style

Listed Building – Grade II
- Official name: Town Hall and Market Buildings
- Designated: 5 August 1991
- Reference no.: 9706

Cawdor Hall (Welsh: Neuadd Cawdor), also known as Newcastle Emlyn Town Hall (Welsh: Neuadd y Dref Castellnewydd Emlyn), is a municipal building in the Market Square, Newcastle Emlyn, Carmarthenshire, Wales. The structure, which is currently used as a theatre, is a Grade II listed building.

== History ==
Following significant population growth, largely as a result of the status of Newcastle Emlyn as a market town, the area became an urban district in 1894. In anticipation of this, the lord of the manor, John Campbell, 2nd Earl Cawdor, whose local seat was at Stackpole Court, decided to procure a new market hall: the site he selected was a triangular area which already served as a Market Square. The building was designed by David Jenkins of Llandeilo in the Jacobean style, built in rubble masonry and was completed in 1892.

The design involved a main block which was orientated east to west together with a southern block. The west end of the main block originally featured two round headed doorways on the ground floor, three rounded headed windows on the first floor, and a coped gable above. The gable was flanked by blocks with ball finials, and surmounted by a semi-circular pediment. The east end of the main block featured an external staircase leading to a round headed doorway on the first floor. The southern block, which was fenestrated by segmental headed windows on both floors, culminated in a tower with a pyramid-style roof which was surmounted by a clock tower with an ogee-shaped dome and a weather vane. Internally, the principal rooms were a market hall and a library, on the ground floor of the main block, and the council chamber, on the first floor of the main block.

The Newcastle Emlyn Dramatic Society, founded in 1932, rehearsed in various places in the town, including the attic above Barclays where it was renamed "The Attic Players", before re-locating to the first floor of Cawdor Hall in 1973. The building continued to serve as the meeting place and offices of Newcastle Emlyn Urban District Council for much of the 20th century, but ceased to be the local seat of government when the enlarged Carmarthen District Council was formed in 1974. However, it subsequently became the meeting place of Newcastle Emlyn Town Council, as well as a permanent theatre for "The Attic Players".

Following completion of an extensive programme of refurbishment works carried out by local contractors, Thomas MacRae, which involved the creation of artists' studios on the ground floor, the building was re-opened by Colin Campbell, 7th Earl Cawdor on 10 June 2015. The works were financed by the Heritage Lottery Fund, Cadw and the Innovative Communities Foundation. A small automated library was established in the foyer of the building in March 2022.
