= George Barham =

British businessman

Sir George Barham
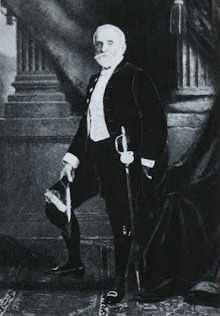
- Sir George Barham
- Born: 22 November 1836; Strand, London, England
- Died: 16 November 1913 (aged 76); Wadhurst, Sussex, England
- Occupation: Businessman
- Known for: Dairy Industry

Sir George Barham (22 November 1836 – 16 November 1913) was an English businessman and founder of the Express Country Milk Company, later to become Express Dairies. He is sometimes described as the father of the British dairying industry.

== Background ==
Barham was born in November 1836 at the Strand, London. He was the younger surviving son of Robert Barham (1807-1888), who owned a retail dairy and had been a licensed victualler, and Altezeera Henrietta (died 1886), daughter of George Davey, of Bletchley, Buckinghamshire. Robert Barham was descended from a long-established family of Sussex yeoman farmers and ironmasters, from which also came John Barham, a High Sheriff of Sussex, and the lawyer and politician Nicholas Barham.

Barham married Margaret Rainey and they had two sons, she died in 1906. Barham died aged 76 in November 1913 at his home at Snape, Wadhurst. With the purchase by his youngest son, Colonel Arthur Saxby Barham, of Hole Park, Rolvenden, Kent, the family were counted amongst the landed gentry.

== Career ==
Barham was apprenticed to a carpenter before working with his father in the dairy business, and in 1864 he founded the Express County Milk Company. A cattle plague in 1865 threatened the supply of milk in London and Barham transported fresh milk to London by rail to avert the crisis. A separate company supplying utensils for the dairy industry was formed as the Dairy Supply Company Limited which by the start of the 20th century was the largest company of its type in the world.

At his own expense Barham helped to introduce modern dairy practices in India and to the West Indies. In 1900 he was appointed a member of the Committee on Milk Standards. He issued a minority report of which most was adopted by the Board of Agriculture. He was called as a witness to a number of commissions on Railway Rates and before the Committee of Food Adulteration. Barham suggested a bill which became the Margarine Act.

== Other interests, positions and awards ==
Barham was elected a Fellow of the Royal Statistical Society in November 1902. He owned two estates at Wadhurst in Sussex and 1895 he stood for the Unionist party in the 1895 general election at West Islington but was not elected. On 5 July 1904 Barham was knighted. He was Mayor of Hampstead in 1905 and 1906 and from 1908 to 1909 High Sheriff of Middlesex.

He died in 1913 and was buried in East Finchley Cemetery.
