= Newcastle Emlyn Castle =

Castle in Carmarthenshire, Wales

Coordinates: 52°02′20″N 4°27′48″W

Newcastle Emlyn Castle

Newcastle Emlyn Castle (Welsh: Castell Newydd Emlyn) is a ruined castle in the market town of Newcastle Emlyn in Carmarthenshire, Wales. It is strategically located on a steep-sided promontory overlooking the River Teifi and was probably built by the Welsh lord Maredudd ap Rhys in about 1240. It changed hands many times over the years in battles between the Welsh and English, and during the English Civil War. The remains of the gatehouse and adjacent towers, and some fragments of wall are all that remain visible now.

== Description ==
The castle is strategically located in a loop of the River Teifi and only approachable by land from the west. The inner ward is triangular and is approached through the twin-towered gatehouse. The towers on either side of the gateway are semi-octagonal on the outside but rectangular inside. There is a well-preserved vaulted cellar under the north tower. The upper floor of the gatehouse was accessed by an external staircase on the east wall next to the north tower, and this may have also provided access to the walkway on the curtain wall which contoured round the site but of which little trace remains today. Latrines on both sides of the gatehouse towers may have been added later, and larger windows were added by Sir Rhys ap Thomas around 1500. A square tower lies just south of the gatehouse and remnants of this are still visible. The great hall was nearby, as was an adjoining chapel and a kitchen and larder, and another building seems to have been present to the east of the gatehouse, but none of these buildings remains visible above ground today.

== History ==
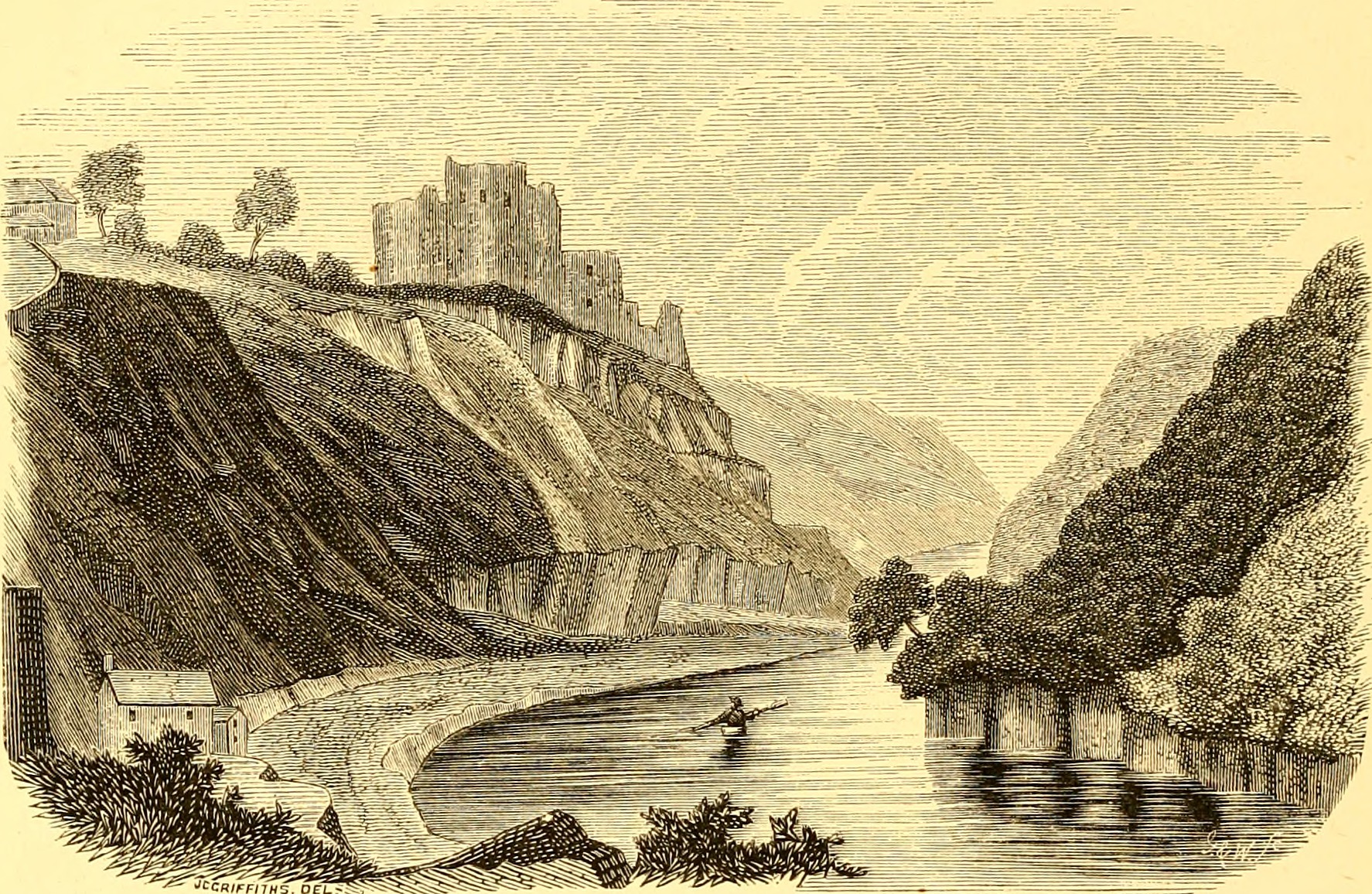
Castle from the Annals and antiquities of the counties, 1872

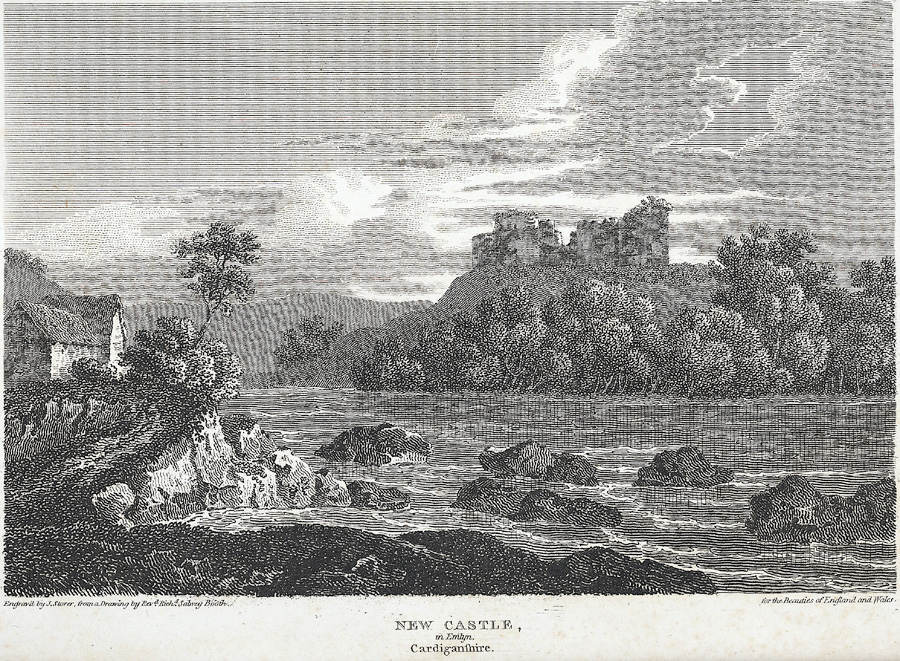
New Castle, in Emlyn, Cardiganshire

The 13th-century castle of Newcastle Emlyn was mentioned in the chronicle Brut y Tywysogion, as having been seized by Llywelyn the Great (Welsh: Llywelyn ap Iorwerth), but this was probably an older structure. The stone building was probably built by Maredudd ap Rhys around 1240, and if this is correct, it is one of the few castles in West Wales to be built by the Welsh out of stone. In 1287, his son Rhys ap Maredudd rebelled against the English and was besieged at Dryslwyn Castle, and when that stronghold eventually fell, fled to Newcastle Emlyn Castle. The English forces hauled their siege engine from Dryslwyn to Cardigan with the help of forty oxen, and then continued up the Teifi Valley to Newcastle Emlyn, now needing sixty oxen to haul it; the castle managed to hold out for some time but eventually fell and passed into English hands, bringing Rhys ap Maredudd's revolt to an end.

Newcastle Emlyn Castle is one of 26 castles, mostly in Wales, that were owned by Edward, the Black Prince. He became the owner as part of the estates acquired when he was made Prince of Wales in 1343. Under his ownership, the castle passed through a period of stability, and one custodian, Richard de la Bere, was in post for nineteen years.

Newcastle Emlyn Castle was captured by the Welsh in 1403 as part of the Glyndŵr Rising. The building was repaired in the 15th century, and was documented as being in good condition in the early 17th century. The castle also played a part in the English Civil War when it changed hands several times and was besieged in 1645 by parliamentary troops. A document from around 1700 noted that the castle had been "dismantled in the late Civill warres and plundered and ever since neglected". While the history of the castle has gained attention from historians, the first accurate plan of the site was not produced until 1985.

== See also ==
- List of castles in Wales
- Castles in Great Britain and Ireland
