= Capel Eidalwyr =

Former chapel in Henllan, Ceredigion, Wales

Coordinates: 52.0356°N 4.3972°W

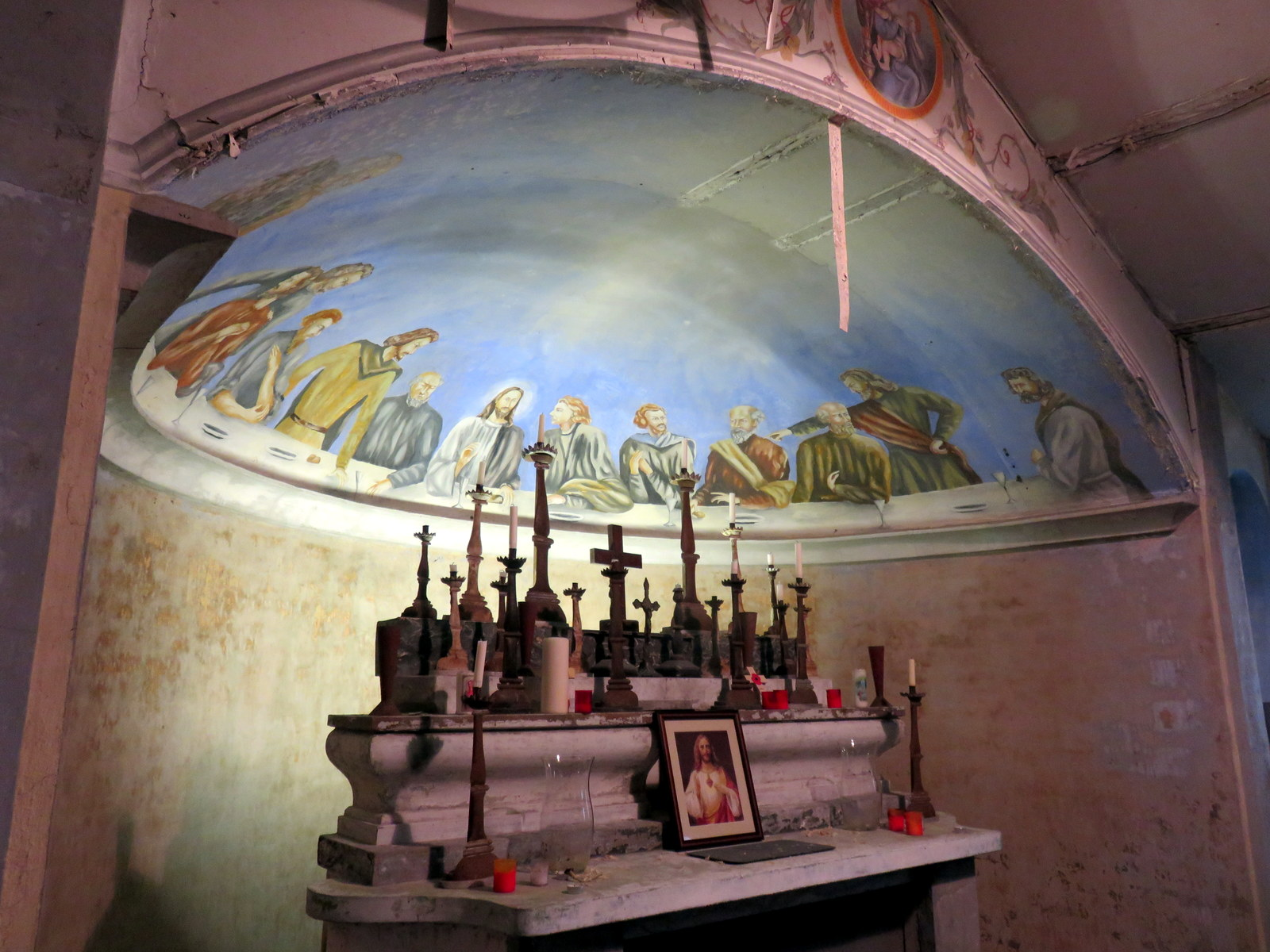
- a "unique and unusually elaborate example"

- Location in Ceredigion
- Location: Henllan, Ceredigion
- Country: Wales
- Denomination: Roman Catholic

History
- Founded: c.1940

Architecture
- Functional status: Redundant
- Architectural type: Chapel
- Style: Vernacular

Listed Building – Grade II*
- Official name: Capel Eidalwyr
- Designated: 4 June 1996
- Reference no.: 17608

Capel Eidalwyr is a Roman Catholic chapel located on the site of a POW camp at Henllan, Ceredigion, Wales. The chapel was established in a former dormitory by Italian prisoners of war, and was decorated mainly by Mario Ferlito. Now disused, and in some disrepair, the chapel is a Grade II* listed building, described in its Cadw record as a "unique and unusually elaborate example".

== History ==
The chapel was the inspiration of Don Ital Padoan, a priest interned at Henllan. Given permission by the camp authorities to convert a Nissen hut previously in use as a dormitory, the prisoners used readily-available materials, including wood from packing cases, empty tinned-food containers, roofing felt and cement bags. Paint was extracted from natural dyes and the painting was principally undertaken by Mario Ferlito. The chapel was formally consecrated in 1944.

Felito returned to the camp with seven other former prisoners in 1977. (Note: Mario Ferlito died in 2008, aged 86, at his home in Ornavasso, Italy.) As of 2020, the chapel has been weather-proofed through complete enclosure within a larger structure and restoration is ongoing. The chapel is open for visits by prior appointment.

== Architecture and description ==
Thomas Lloyd, Julian Orbach and Robert Scourfield, in their Carmarthenshire and Ceredigion volume of the Pevsner Buildings of Wales series, consider the interior decoration of the chapel, "the most remarkable home-made Baroque crafted of scrap materials." The apse is decorated with a fresco of the Last Supper, and the walls with roundels illustrated in a Baroque style. Further decoration is provided by concrete wall mouldings, scraped and painted to resemble marble. Capel Eidalwyr is a Grade II* listed building, its Cadw record describing it as a "unique and unusually elaborate example of a P.O.W. Chapel in Wales”.

== Gallery ==
The former Prisoner of War Camp, Henllan

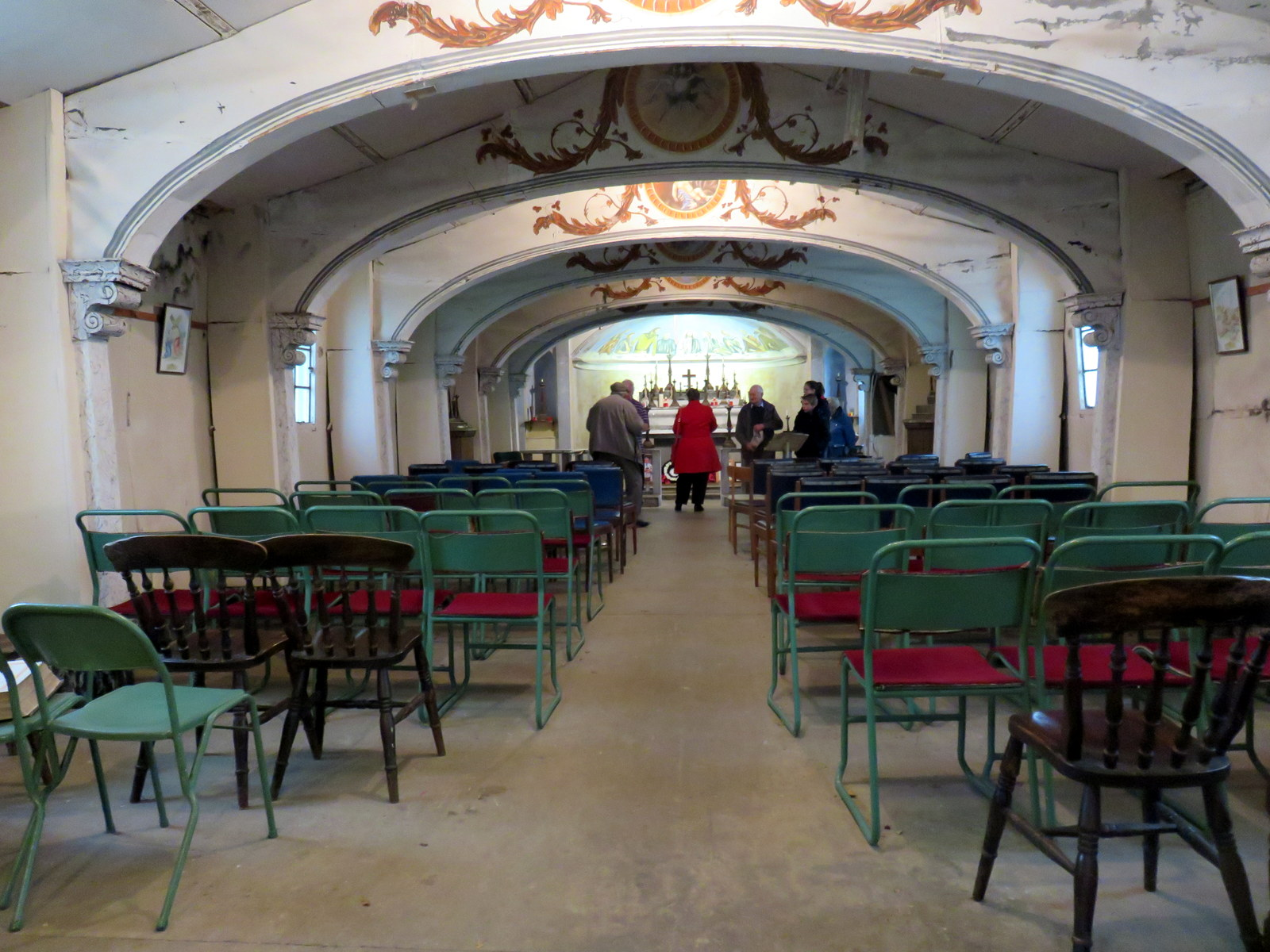
Interior of the chapel

== Sources ==
- Lloyd, Thomas; Orbach, Julian; Scourfield, Robert (2006). Carmarthenshire and Ceredigion. The Buildings of Wales. New Haven, US and London: Yale University Press. ISBN 978-0-300-10179-9.
