= Newcastle Emlyn railway station =

Former railway station in Wales

Coordinates: 52°2′7.91″N 4°27′42.91″W

Newcastle Emlyn was a railway station terminus in the town of Newcastle Emlyn, West Wales, on the proposed broad gauge Teifi Valley line of the Carmarthen and Cardigan Railway.

== History ==
The Teifi Valley Railway was originally conceived as a 7 ft 1/4 in (2,140 mm) broad-gauge line between Carmarthen and Cardigan. The line was opened temporarily in 1860, under the South Wales Railway and was fully opened the following year. It was operated by the Carmarthen and Cardigan Railway between Carmarthen and Cynwyl Elfed. In 1864, the line was extended to Pencader and Llandysul.

By 1872 it had been converted to standard gauge (4 ft 8 1/2 in (1,435 mm)) but, by now, the line was bankrupt. Bought by the Great Western Railway, it extended the terminus to Newcastle Emlyn in 1895, The GWR saw no point in developing the line beyond this point and so it became a terminus.

Passenger services ceased in 1952, but goods services continued to run due in part to milk train services to the Co-operative Group creamery. Co-located at the station, later owned by Dried Milk Products it latterly produced cheese. Freight services continued until 1973.

== Preservation ==
After the cessation of freight services, the lines were removed and the station demolished. Today there is no sign of the station and the site has been redeveloped as a garage.

The 2 ft (610 mm) Teifi Valley Railway, taking its name from what the old line was called locally, is a narrow gauge steam/diesel visitor attraction which runs part way to Newcastle Emlyn from its base at Henllan. Extension of its line into Newcastle Emlyn will require rebuilding of a bridge over the River Teifi which had been demolished following storm damage in 1987.
