= Express Dairies =

Former brand of Dairy Crest

- Type: Subsidiary
- Industry: Dairy Products
- Founded: 1864 (as Express Country Milk Supply Company)
- Headquarters: London
- Key people: George Barham (founder)
- Parent: Dairy Crest

Express Dairies is a former brand of Dairy Crest, that specialised almost entirely in home deliveries of milk, and other dairy products.

== History ==
The company was founded by George Barham in 1864 as the 'Express Country Milk Supply Company,' so named as they used only express trains to get their milk to London. The company had two major creamery and bottling plants in London. The first was located just south of South Acton railway station on the North London Line. This gave easy and equal access for milk trains from both the Great Western Railway and the Southern Railway. The second was located at the company's headquarters in Cricklewood, adjacent to the station. This had railway access for milk trains from the London, Midland and Scottish Railway. By 1950 Express also had creameries and bottling plants at Brentford, Bromley, Eltham and Finchley as well as other across England.

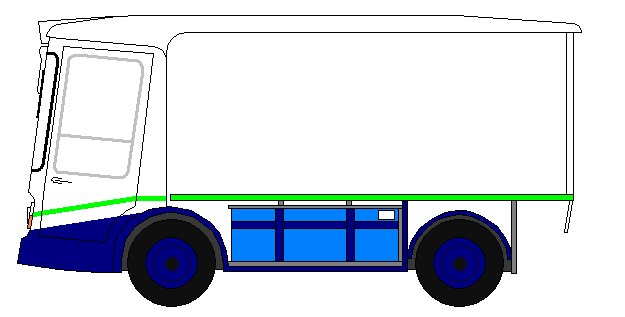
An Express Dairies Morrison Marsden milk float

The company was purchased by Grand Metropolitan in 1969, and sold in November 1991 to Northern Foods. It was demerged from Northern Foods in 1998, and purchased a 51% controlling stake in Claymore Dairies Ltd of Scotland, for £2.2 million.

Express Dairies acquired Star Dairies Food Service Ltd. and certain assets of Star Dairies International Ltd for £3.5 million in February 1999. In June 1999, the liquid milk operations of the United Kingdom of Glanbia plc were acquired for £100 million, and the share capital of Blakes Chilled Distribution Ltd. was purchased in August for £3 million.

Express Dairies announced a joint venture in Northern Ireland with Golden Vale plc in November 2000, that created Dale Farm Dairies Ltd, although that was sold in October 2001. Express Dairies disposed of its UHT business and Frome creamery in July 2002.

Following a period of poor profitability, the business was acquired in March 2003 by Arla Foods, who in turn sold it on to Dairy Crest in July 2006. Dairy Crest sold its deliveries business to Creamline Dairies in July 2013, and its milk processing business to Germany's Müller in December 2015.

== Subsidiaries ==
=== Premier Supermarkets ===
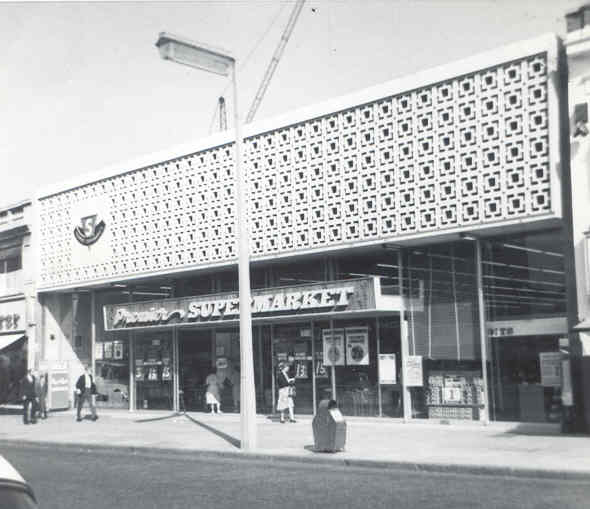
A Premier Supermarket, 1963

Express Dairy already ran a chain of nearly 400 retail dairy and grocery shops in the London area with others across England. They also had a chain of tea room and restaurants that were serviced from a central Bakery at Highbury, north London.

Post war, Britain was changing. The chairman's new son-in-law, American citizen and ex-sailor of the US Navy, Patrick Galvani, had been studying retailing before coming to the United Kingdom, particularly supermarkets. Galvani made a pitch to the board, which resulted in Britain's first supermarket opening in Streatham, South London in 1951 under the Premier Supermarket brand.

In 1960, in an attempt to expand nationwide, Galvani made a pitch to the board to buy the 212 stores of John Irwin and Sons, based in Liverpool and Merseyside, but they refused to back him; Jack Cohen of Tesco subsequently bought the chain. In 1964, the Premier chain was sold to Unilever's Mac Fisheries chain for £1million. The cash income allowed Express to develop and launch marketing for long-life milk.

=== Eden Vale ===
In 1955, Express Dairies set up a subsidiary to maintain and promote demand for dairy products, using the Eden Vale brand.

The Eden Vale division became responsible for Express' chilled food interests including yogurts, desserts, salads, cottage cheese and fromage frais.

In addition to the Eden Vale name, it also sold yogurt under the Ski brand (launched in 1963) and in the early 1980s launched a range of child-orientated yogurts based around characters from the Munch Bunch books and television series.

In 2002, Northern Foods, the then-owners of Express Dairies, sold the Ski and Munch Bunch brands, along with their Cheshire yogurt plant, to Nestlé. In 2004, Northern Foods sold the Eden Vale plant at Minsterley to Uniq.
