= Milk car =

Railroad car for conveyance of milk

Milk cars are a specialized type of railroad car intended to transport raw milk from collection points near dairy farms to a processing creamery. Some milk cars were intended for loading with multiple cans of milk, while others were designed with a single tank for bulk loading. Milk cars were often equipped with high-speed passenger trucks, passenger-type buffer plates, and train signal and steam lines seldom found on conventional refrigerator cars.

== Origins ==
Milk has long been a staple food of agricultural societies. Fresh milk sours quickly if kept warm. Railways were used as early as 1840 to rapidly transport fresh milk from farms to cities. Early milk transport was in covered, tin-plated steel cans containing about 10 U.S. gallons (38 liters; 8.3 imperial gallons). Passenger trains typically offered the fastest service, so milk cans might have first been loaded into baggage cars. A farmer would adjust his herd milking schedule to have the milk cans filled shortly before scheduled arrival of the train. When multiple farmers required shipment, a separate car might be carried by the train specifically for milk cans; and that car could be delivered directly to the creamery to minimize time required for intermediate handling of the milk cans with other baggage. Once the handling advantages of a separate car were recognized, milk cars were built with insulation to reduce warming during transit and the milk cans might be packed in ice during warm weather. A few milk cars were built or retrofitted with mechanical refrigeration following World War II.

== Tank cars for bulk loading ==
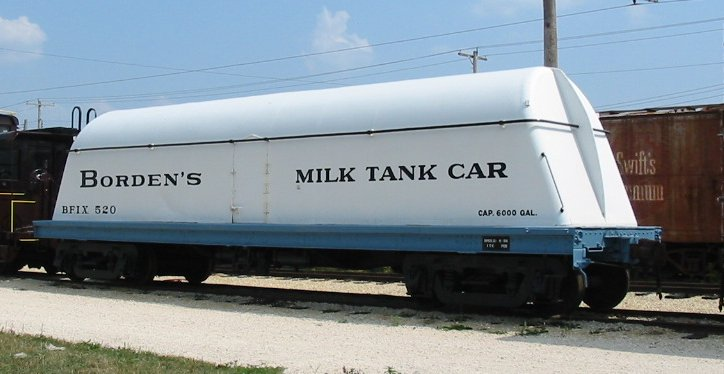
These distinctive 6000-gallon (5,000 imp gal; 23,000 L) Borden milk tank cars for bulk loading were first built in 1936.

Increased availability of motor vehicles after World War I encouraged bulk transport of milk to minimize inefficient handling, washing and redistribution of milk cans. A standard 46.5-US-quart (44.0 L; 38.7 imp qt) milk can weighed 27 pounds (12 kg) and held 86 pounds (39 kg) of milk. Farmers needed two sets of milk cans so one might be filled while the other was at the dairy. Early milk cans had been soldered from three pieces, but they were later replaced by rolled and molded single-piece cans, which avoided uncleaned cracks in the solder joints. Milk tank cars were first made of glass-lined steel, and later of stainless steel. These tanks were often enclosed for insulation within a car body resembling a boxcar. These tank cars were usually filled with milk pre-cooled to 38 °F (3.3 °C) at a central collection point just prior to being picked up by a milk train with a delivery schedule avoiding the need for additional cooling during transit. Milk was shipped from Wisconsin to Florida as a test; and the temperature rose only a single degree Fahrenheit (0.56 °C) during a trip lasting 101 hours.

Caspar Pfaudler invented a method of lining cast iron tanks with glass while working with the brewing industry. The first glass-lined tanks were built by the Dickson Manufacturing Company in 1887; and the Pure Food and Drug Act of 1906 increased use of these tanks for milk products. The Boston and Maine Railroad (B&M) was using a milk car with glass-lined steel tanks in 1910. Pfaudler designed what became a standard milk car with two 3,000-US-gallon (11,000 L; 2,500 imp gal) tanks inside a closed car. Earlier cars featured a removable roof to replace damaged tanks, but the tanks proved durable enough to eliminate that feature from later production. Pfaudler cars included brine coils to cool the car at the creamery, and an electric stirring mechanism to keep butterfat distributed through the milk and minimize deposition on the interior of the tank. Stirring also helped maintain a uniform temperature throughout the tank.

== Peak use and decline ==
Large cities in the eastern United States encouraged nearby rural areas to specialize in production of milk, but milk cars were transporting milk up to 300 mi (483 km) by 1900. Railroads connecting these rural areas to cities scheduled daily milk trains (sometimes called milk runs) to pick up loaded milk cars from collection points along their route. These trains sometimes carried a mail car and a passenger car. Milk trains usually arrived at their destination cities in the late evening so the milk could be unloaded and processed for delivery the following morning. A returning train of empty milk cars departed the city in the early morning hours. These were often the last scheduled passenger trains serving those rural areas, and most milk was traveling in highway trucks by 1960. Rail transport of milk peaked in 1931 when the Official Railway Equipment Register listed 2174 railway-owned milk cars and 480 cars owned by shippers. Most railway-owned milk cars were made of wood; but the Erie Railroad built over two hundred steel cars in the 1930s, and fifty steel cars delivered to B&M in 1958 were the last milk cars built for United States railroads. The last fifteen were numbered 1900–1914, and equipped with gasoline-powered mechanical refrigeration to transport bottled milk as a unit train from Bellows Falls, Vermont to First National Stores in Somerville, Massachusetts. B&M cars numbered 1915-1934 were built without mechanical refrigeration and served as insulated boxcars when no longer needed for milk transport. After bottled milk loadings ended in 1964, B&M made the last United States delivery of bulk milk in August 1972 to Boston from Eagle Bridge, New York.

== See also ==
- British railway milk tank wagon
