= Newcastle Emlyn =

Town in West Wales

Newcastle Emlyn: Welsh: Castellnewydd Emlyn
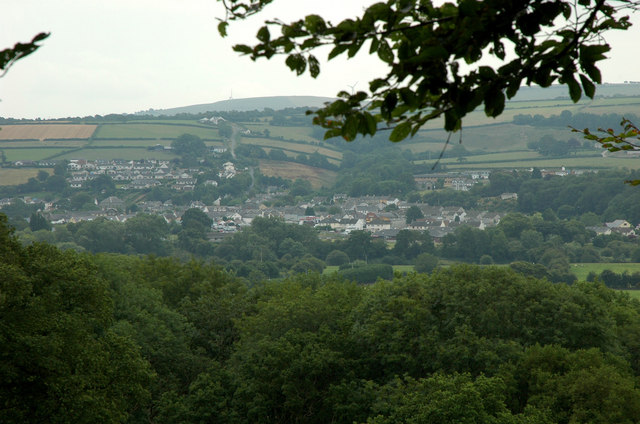
- View across the Teifi valley towards Newcastle Emlyn

- Location within Carmarthenshire
- Population: 1,144 (Community, 2021); 1,883 (Built up area, 2011)
- OS grid reference: SN305405
- Community: Newcastle Emlyn
- Principal area: Carmarthenshire
- Preserved county: Dyfed
- Country: Wales
- Sovereign state: United Kingdom
- Post town: NEWCASTLE EMLYN
- Postcode district: SA38
- Dialling code: 01239
- Police: Dyfed-Powys
- Fire: Mid and West Wales
- Ambulance: Welsh
- UK Parliament: Caerfyrddin
- Senedd Cymru – Welsh Parliament: Carmarthen East and Dinefwr
- Website: newcastleemlyntowncouncil.co.uk
- List of places UK Wales Carmarthenshire 52.04°N 4.47°W Map of the community

Newcastle Emlyn (Welsh: Castellnewydd Emlyn) is a town and community on the River Teifi, in West Wales. The community is wholly in Carmarthenshire, but the built up area also includes Adpar north of the Teifi, which is in Ceredigion. Adpar was formerly called Trefhedyn and was historically a borough in its own right. Newcastle Emlyn grew around its castle, which dates from the 13th century. At the 2021 census the community had a population of 1,144. The built up area (including Adpar) had a population of 1,883 at the 2011 census.

== History ==
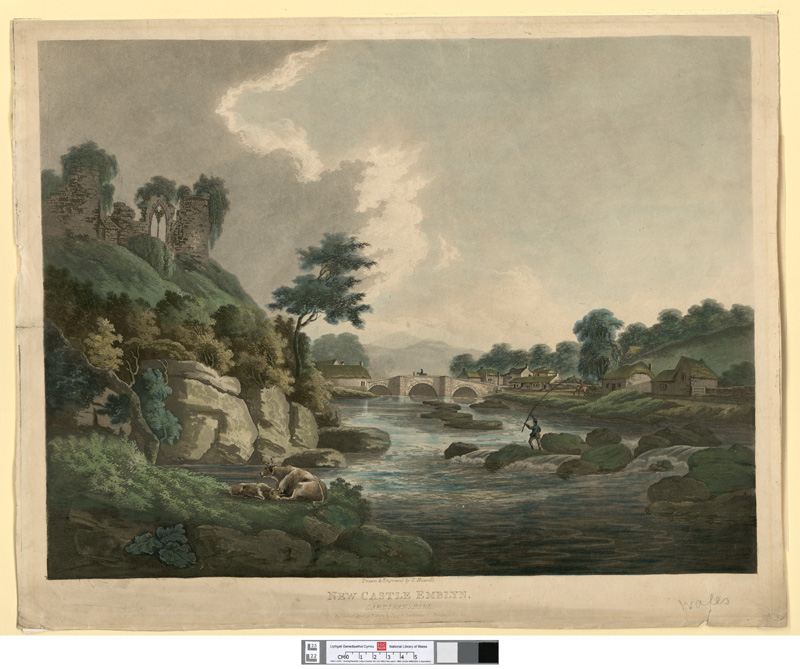
Newcastle Emlyn, 1804

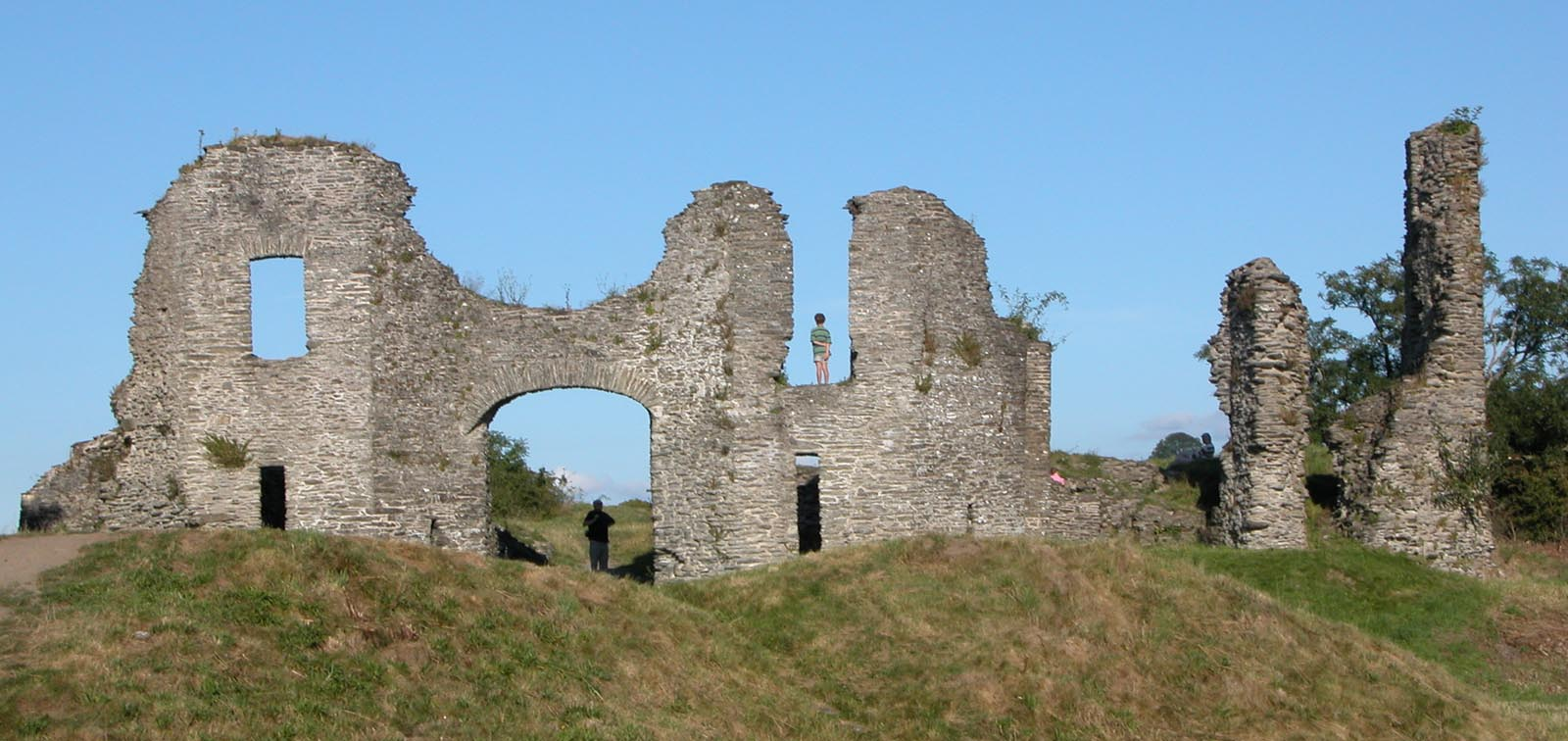
The remains of the Norman castle.

The town takes its name from the cantref of Emlyn, an administrative district in medieval Dyfed.

Newcastle Emlyn Castle, was first mentioned in Brut y Tywysogion in 1215, when it was seized by Llewelyn the Great (Welsh: Llywelyn Fawr). It was captured by the Welsh during the revolt of 1287–1288 and also by Owain Glyndŵr in 1403.

Cawdor Hall was completed in 1892.

The Teifi Valley Railway is nearby, although the town has not had a passenger train service since 1952.

Newcastle Emlyn hosted the Urdd National Eisteddfod in 1981.

== Governance ==
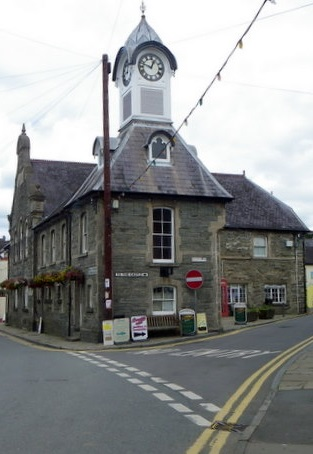
Cawdor Hall

There are two tiers of local government covering Newcastle Emlyn, at community (town) and county level: Newcastle Emlyn Town Council (Cynfor Tref Castell Newydd Emlyn) and Carmarthenshire County Council (Cyngor Sir Gâr). The town council meets at Cawdor Hall on Market Square. North of the Teifi, Adpar forms part of the community of Llandyfriog in Ceredigion. As well as Llandyfriog, the Newcastle Emlyn community is also bordered by those of Llangeler and Cenarth, both of which are in Carmarthenshire.

=== Administrative history ===
Newcastle Emlyn was historically part of the ancient parish of Cenarth. Newcastle Emlyn and Adpar have always been administratively separate for local government purposes, although between 1832 and 1885 Newcastle Emlyn was in the Adpar parliamentary borough, which formed part of the Cardigan Boroughs constituency.

When elected parish and district councils were established in 1894, Cenarth was given a parish council and included in the Newcastle Emlyn Rural District. In 1897 part of the parish of Cenarth was converted into an urban district called Newcastle Emlyn.

Newcastle Emlyn Urban District was abolished in 1974 under the Local Government Act 1972. A community called Newcastle Emlyn was created covering the area of the former urban district, with its community council taking the name Newcastle Emlyn Town Council. District-level functions passed to the new Carmarthen District Council. Carmarthenshire County Council was abolished as part of the same reforms, with county-level functions passing to the new Dyfed County Council. The district of Carmarthen and county of Dyfed were both abolished in 1996 and their councils' functions passed to a re-established Carmarthenshire County Council.

== Economy ==
In 1932, the former Co-operative creamery was reopened by Dried Milk Products to make cheese. After a new parent firm, Unigate, decided to sell off its non-milk related dairies, it was bought by the Milk Marketing Board in 1979, but closed again in 1983.

== Transport ==
In 1895, the Teifi Valley Railway of the Great Western Railway (GWR) reached Newcastle Emlyn railway station. Originally conceived as a 7 ft, ¼ inch broad-gauge line between Carmarthen and Cardigan by the Carmarthen and Cardigan Railway, it was absorbed into the GWR, which developed the line only as far as Newcastle Emlyn.

Passenger services ceased in 1952, but goods services continued until 1973, due in part to milk train services to the cheese-producing creamery. After the goods service ceased, the lines were removed and the station demolished.

== Demography ==
According to the United Kingdom census 2011 Newcastle Emlyn had a population of 1,883, including Adpar on the Ceredigion side of the River Teifi. A 2017 population estimate put it at 1,888, of whom 52 per cent were female and 48 per cent male, with 379 aged 0–17 years, 979 aged 18–64, and 530 aged over 65.

The 2001 UK census had 69 per cent of the 950 people then living in Newcastle Emlyn speaking fluent Welsh, although the proportion fell in the next decade to 54 per cent, as the town population increased to 1,138 aged 3 or over by 2011. The drop in Welsh usage in Newcastle Emlyn between 2001 and 2011 was among the biggest in Wales, though not uncommon across Ceredigion and Carmarthenshire.

The latest Estyn inspection report in 2012 on the town's English-medium secondary school notes that only 12 per cent of pupils came from homes where Welsh is spoken, with 31 per cent considered fluent in the language. Parents have the option of sending their children to a designated Welsh-medium secondary school, Ysgol Bro Teifi in Llandysul, Ceredigion. Only 64.8 per cent of the town's residents were born in Wales.

The town has a dual-language primary school, and also a pre-school establishment known as Meithrinfa Teifi Tots Nursery.

== Education and culture ==
Newcastle Emlyn has a secondary school, Ysgol Gyfun Emlyn. The town's attractions include an art gallery, the Attic Theatre company and the National Woollen Museum.

== Sports ==
Newcastle Emlyn has association football and rugby teams. Newcastle Emlyn Football Club are members of the Football Association of Wales and Newcastle Emlyn RFC of the Welsh Rugby Union.

== Legend ==
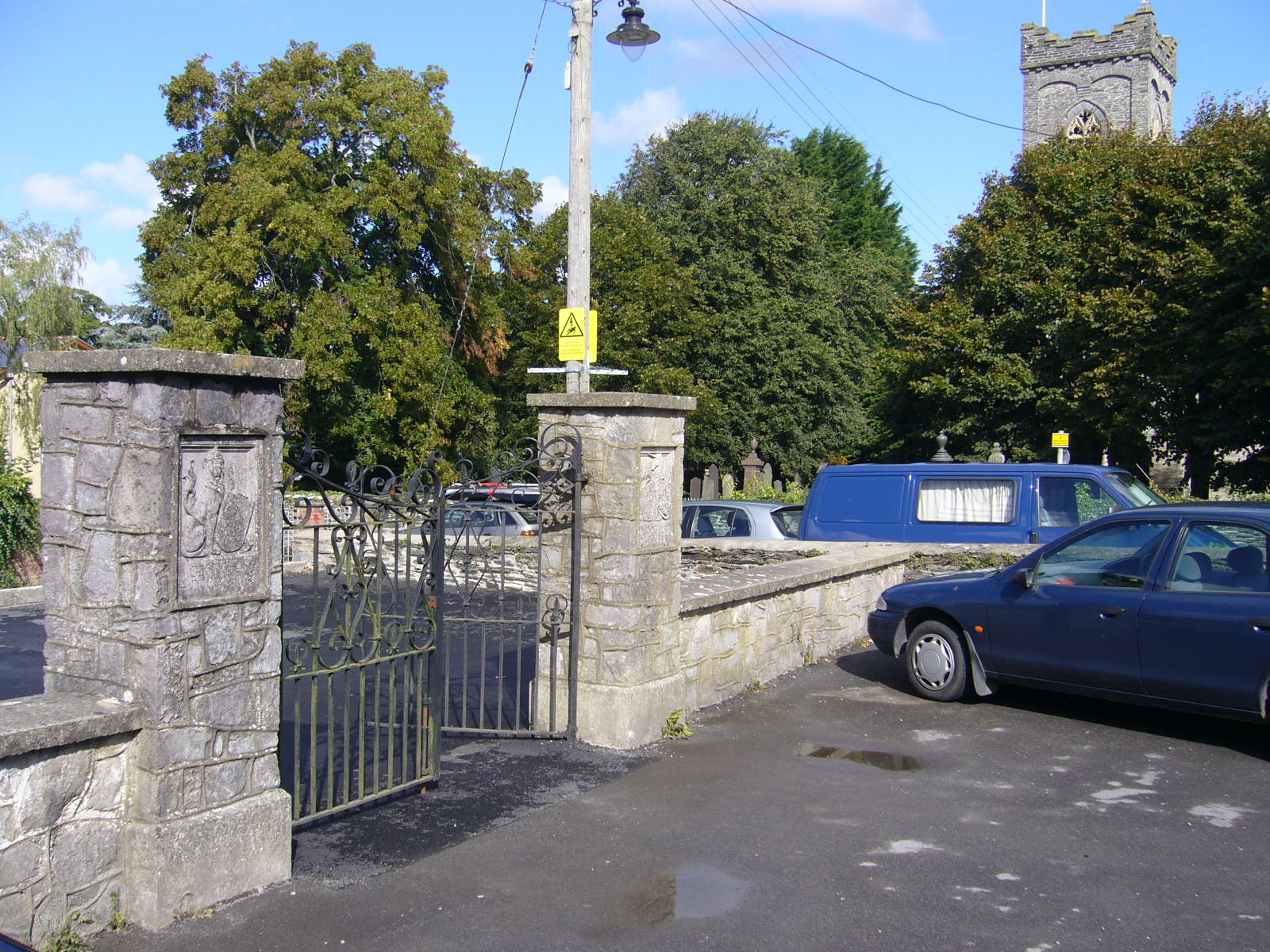
The entrance to King George's Field in Church Lane, Newcastle Emlyn, Carmarthenshire. Holy Trinity Church is in the background on the right.

A legend of the Wyvern of Newcastle Emlyn (Gwiber Castell Newydd Emlyn) tells how on a fair day when the town was full, a winged wyvern breathing fire and smoke landed on the castle walls, stared threateningly, then settled down to sleep. The general terror gave way to an effort by a few townsfolk to destroy it. A soldier waded the Teifi to a vantage point on the castle side and released a red cloak into the river. The creature, suddenly woken, caught sight of the cloak, fell on it with shrieks and tore it to shreds, but was shot in its vulnerable underparts. The assailant escaped to safety. The dying wyvern turned over and floated down the river, its wound gushing venom that fouled the water and killed all the fish. There was joy at the monster's death.

== Twin town ==
Newcastle Emlyn is twinned with Plonévez-Porzay in Brittany, France.

== Notable people ==
In birth order:

- Evan Herber Evans (1836–1896), Congregational minister
- Allen Raine (1836–1908), novelist
- Peter Rees Jones (1843–1905), founder of Peter Jones department store
- Owen Picton Davies (1872–1940), Liberal Party politician and hotel proprietor
- Martyn Lloyd-Jones (1899–1981), Evangelical leader, buried in the town
- John Elwyn (1916–1997), British painter, illustrator and educator, Adpar
- Dill Jones (1923–1984), jazz stride pianist
- Helen Thomas (1966–1989), peace campaigner at Greenham Common
- Josh Turnbull (born 1988) Welsh rugby union international from Newcastle Emlyn RFC
- Scott Williams (born 1990), Welsh rugby union international from Newcastle Emlyn RFC
- Gareth Davies (born 1990), Welsh rugby union and British and Irish Lion international from Newcastle Emlyn RFC
