= British railway milk tank wagon =

Train car for transporting raw milk

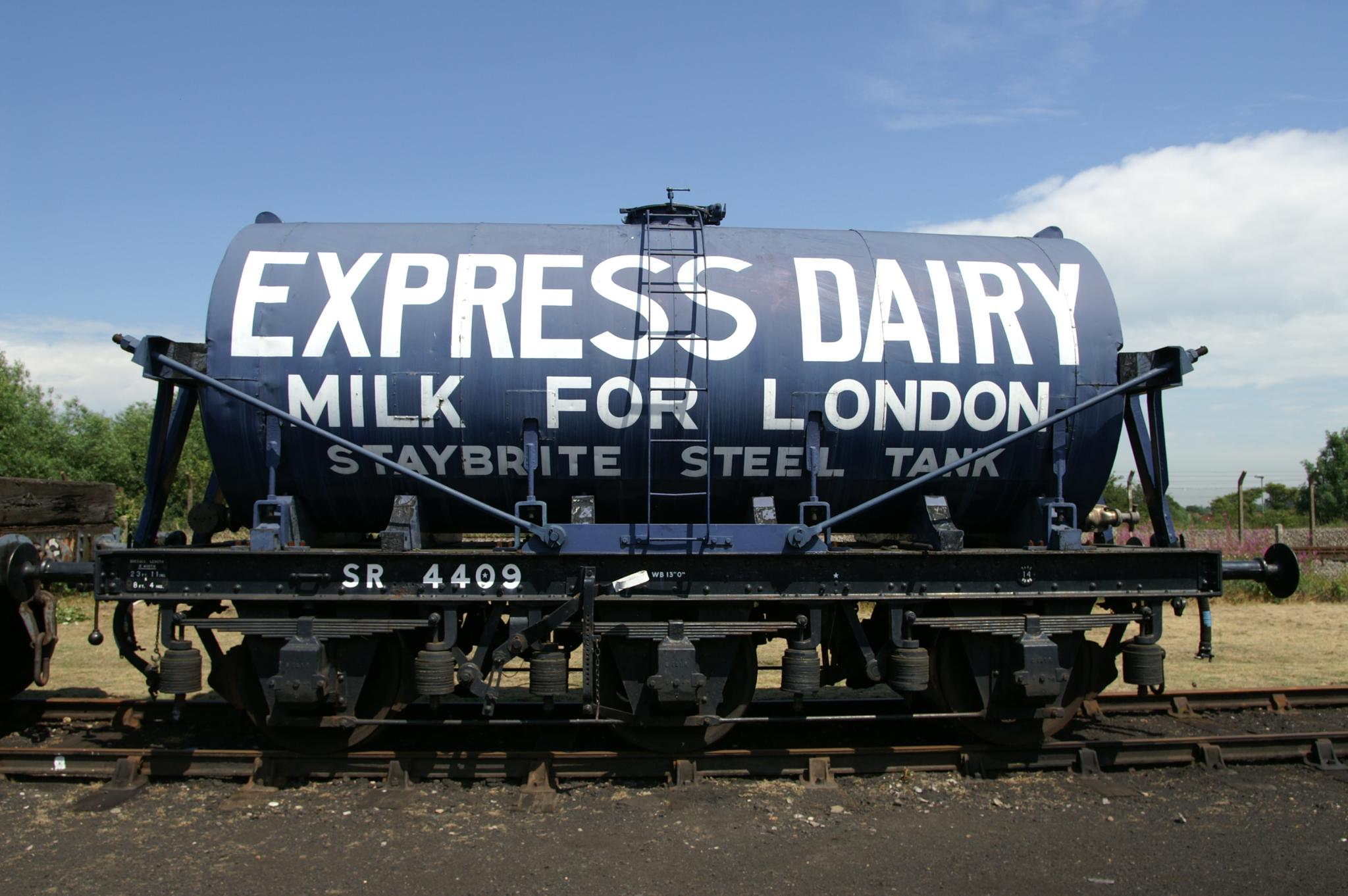
Preserved Express Dairies three-axle Milk Tank Wagon at the Didcot Railway Centre, based on an SR chassis

Milk tank wagons were a common sight on railways in the United Kingdom from the early 1930s to the late 1960s. Introduced to transport raw milk from remote dairy farms to central creameries, milk trains were the last railway-based system before the move to road transport.

== Background ==
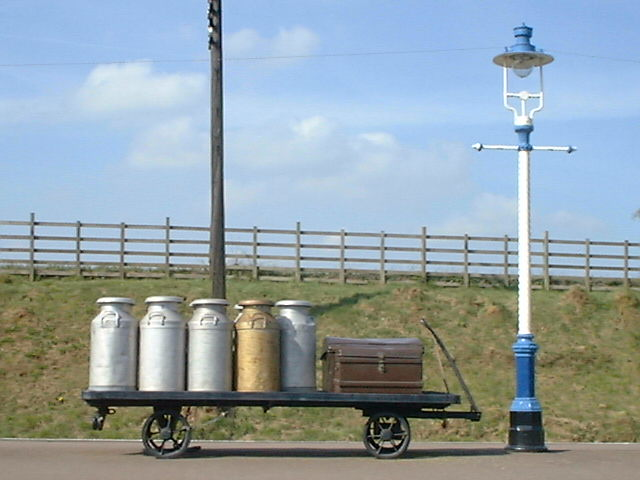
Typical pre-World War I scene of milk churns waiting to be picked up by the milk train, recreated at Quorn and Woodhouse station on the preserved Great Central Railway

Post grouping in 1923, of the 282,000,000 imperial gallons (12,800,000 hL; 339,000,000 US gal) of milk transported by rail by all four national railways companies, the Great Western Railway had the largest share of milk traffic, serving the rural and highly agricultural West of England and South Wales; followed by the LMS which collected from Cumbria and North Wales; the Southern particularly from the Somerset and Dorset Railway; and finally the LNER from East Anglia.

Often, the milk was delivered direct from the farmer to the local railway station in milk churns. So to remove the need for moving unprocessed milk from one container to another, and hence potential cross contamination or need to install hygienic washing facilities, the decision was taken to transport the milk churns. From the 1880s, the GWR had introduced the popular GWR Siphon series of passenger carriage chassis-based high-speed and ventilated enclosed wagons, but with volumes rising and production systems changing, the transport system had to change.

== Design ==
Under the milk churn system, the steel churn had been owned either by the farmer or the dairy, to which was attached a paper delivery note for the railway. The three participants hence agreed to adopt the same ownership system for the new milk tank wagons, whereby the chassis was supplied by the railway company, while the carrying tank was supplied by the dairy.

The first designs were introduced by the GWR and the LMS in 1927, followed a year later by the LNER. The SR initially experimented with 2,000-imperial-gallon (9,100 L; 2,400 US gal) roll-on/roll-off two or three-axled road trailers, which after being towed to each farm by a dairy company or SR lorry, could be taken to the railway station and then strapped down on a standard railway flat wagon. 60 of these road tankers were built, but although the system survived in some areas, by 1931 the SR had abandoned marketing the system and moved inline with the other railway companies, under pressure from the big dairies. The GWR later trialled the idea, and some tanks were redeployed to the Western Region of British Railways on nationalisation in 1948.

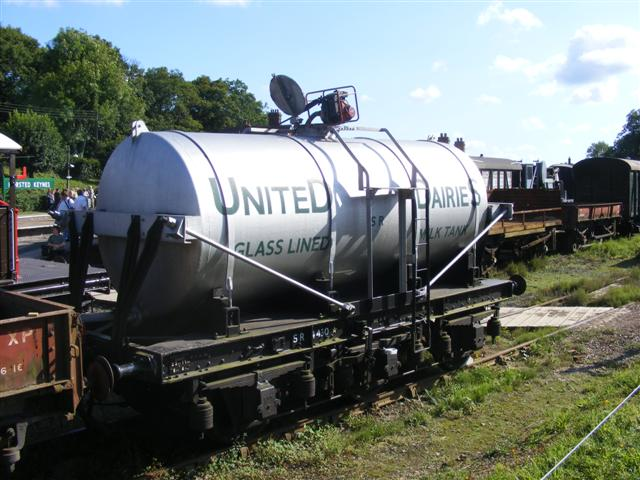
Preserved United Dairies three-axle Milk Tank Wagon at the Bluebell Railway, based on an SR chassis

The initial milk tank wagon designs were based on a 12-foot (3.7 m) two axle railway wagon chassis. There was a ladder either side to allow filling via an industrial rubber hose into a flip-top dome casing, while a steel pipe exited at the bottom of the tank with a tap either end of the chassis between the buffer beams for extraction. Unlike typical goods wagons, all milk wagons used vacuum braking due to their high-speed deployment. The various designs that railway companies used followed a common pattern, but even at this early stage differences appeared making them easy to spot. While GWR designs used flat-strip metal as bracing, LMS and SR designs used rounded steel bracing. SR designs had additional V-shaped support bracing either end, and had additional wooden packing behind each of the buffers. LMS designs had a catwalk around the filling dome.

The first tanks were labelled externally as being glass-lined (they were actually vitreous enamel), meaning that the wagons themselves were unauthorised for loose or hump shunting, a reminder of which was applied in large capital letters to the chassis. Early tank design had no baffles, meaning that the milk self-churned during the journey, and made the wagon highly unstable. After the required improvement in milk quality was not gained, and a number of derailment accidents, 13 feet (4.0 m) three-axled six-wheel wagons were introduce from 1931, and baffles became standard practise. The last of the two-axle design were withdrawn pre-World War II, while three-axle designs continued in production under British Railways into the early 1950s, but now with stainless steel linings.

Later, limited production twin-tank designs were introduced, all based on triple-axle chassis. More common on the GWR, they were also used by the SR for transport of dairy products from the Channel Islands that came in via Southampton Docks. Twin-tanks allowed the easy collection from smaller dairies of both premium gold-top, as well as other silver-top products.

In total, across all four railway companies, some 600 three-axle milk tank wagons were produced.

== Livery ==
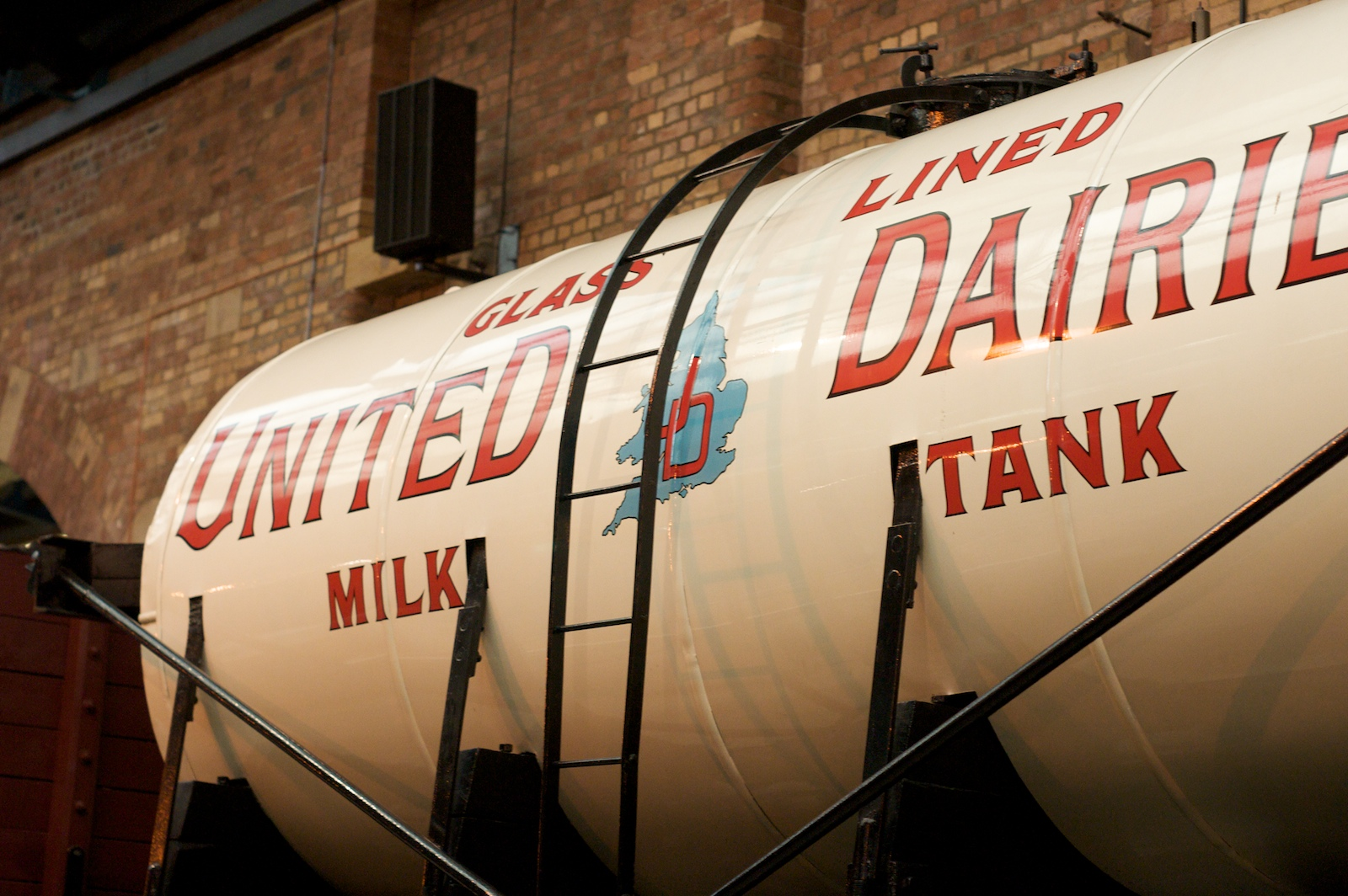
Preserved detail on a typical pre-World War II United Dairies three-axle Milk Tank Wagon at the National Railway Museum, based on an SR chassis

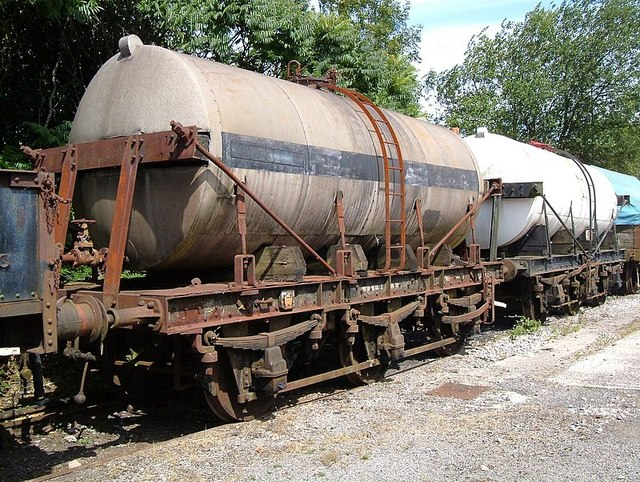
Preserved Milk Marketing Board three-axle Milk Tank Wagon at the East Somerset Railway, based on a GWR chassis

Each railway company applied its own logo and number to the chassis, while each dairy applied its own separate colouring, fleet number and labelling to the carried milk tank.

The wagons as out-shopped from various railway works were highly decorated – often to show both cleanliness, good hygiene, and as a travelling advertising board. Early designs had a high amount of labelling, mentioning insulation, hygienic glass lining, and the dairy company name in large superscript and shadowed letters on the sides of the tank. The resultant wagons were kept very clean by both the dairies (who washed them at both ends of the journey), and the handling railway companies.

After the Milk Marketing Board was created in 1933, in 1942 during World War II they took control of all milk transport. Only when the wagons needed a repaint, did the MMB apply a standard branded design of silver-grey with "MMB MILK" embossed in 4 feet (1.2 m) high black letters externally. Some of the last MMB designs used a blue tank colour with white lettering. Hence, many of the former private owner wagons designs survived well into British Railways ownership, in a now faded and flaking state. MMB were not so fastidious on cleanliness standards, and so often in photographs either the cleaned silver paint has faded to white, or the wagons look dirty.

By the late 1960s the MMB had switched entirely to road haulage, and only Express Dairies and Unigate continued to use rail transport. Both companies used former MMB stock supplied by British Railways, but while Express Dairies applied their own numbering to the tank, Unigate referenced their wagons through the BR chassis number. Unhappy with the image of the faded and dirty liveries, Unigate applied St Ivel-style painting to some of its wagons, with 50/50 split top/bottom of white top and orange bottom to the tank, and blue St Ivel logo to one end. The chassis, ladder and end support frames were all black with white lettering.

== Preservation ==
A number of milk tank wagons have survived into preservation, mainly due to their recent usage as well as their ability to be redeployed on a typical heritage railway in a number of ancillary tasks when filled with water, i.e. water replenishment tank for steam locomotives; mobile fire tender; application of weed killer to control lineside vegetation.

== See also ==
- British railway milk trains
- Milk car
- Tank cars for bulk loading

== Bibliography ==
- Cooper, Basil Knowlman (1986). Great Western Railway Handbook. Ian Allan. ISBN 9780711016170.
- Larkin, Dave (1978). BR General Parcels Rolling Stock. D Bradford Barton. ISBN 9780851533209.
- Russell, Jim H. (1972). Pictorial Record of Great Western Coaches. Vol. Part 1 1838–1913. Oxford Publishing.
- Atkins, A. G.; Beard, W.; Hyde, D. J.; Tourret, R. (1975). A History of GWR Goods Wagons. Vol. 1. David and Charles. ISBN 0-7153-6532-0.
- Atkins, A. G.; Beard, W.; Hyde, D. J.; Tourret, R. (1976). A History of GWR Goods Wagons. Vol. 2. David and Charles. ISBN 0-7153-7290-4.
