= Parthian Books =

Publishers from Wales

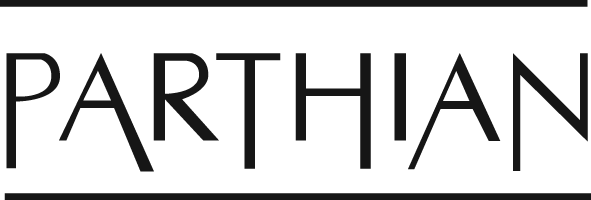
- Status: Active
- Founded: 1993; 33 years ago
- Founder: Richard Lewis Davies; Gillian Griffiths; Ravi Pawar
- Country of origin: Wales
- Headquarters location: Cardigan
- Publication types: Books
- Imprints: Library of Wales
- Official website: parthianbooks.com

Parthian Books is an independent publisher based in Cardigan, Wales. Editorially-led, it publishes a range of contemporary fiction, poetry, drama, art books, literature in translation, and non-fiction. Since its foundation in 1993, Parthian has published some of the best-known works of contemporary Welsh literature including Work, Sex and Rugby (1993) by Lewis Davies, In and Out of the Goldfish Bowl (2000) by Rachel Trezise, Crawling Through Thorns (2008) by John Sam Jones, Pigeon (2017) by Alys Conran, The Shape of a Forest (2013) by Jemma L King and Hello Friend We Missed You (2020) by Richard Owain Roberts.

It is involved in the European literary scene and has also published celebrity autobiographies, such as Griff Rhys Jones' Insufficiently Welsh and Boyd Clack's Kisses Sweeter Than Wine. In 2019, Parthian was recognised as the Small Press of the Year for Wales at the "Nibbies", the British Book Awards. Parthian's motto is "A Carnival of Voices in Independent Publishing".

== History ==
=== Origins ===
Parthian Books was founded in Cardiff in 1993 by Richard Lewis Davies, who was then labouring on building sites, artist Gillian Griffiths, and teacher Ravi Pawar. Initial development training and support for the company was provided by the Prince's Youth Business Trust (now known as the Prince's Trust) and the Enterprise Allowance. The novel Work, Sex and Rugby by Lewis Davies, Parthian's debut release, was launched at Chapter and Verse Bookshop during the Cardiff Literary Festival in September 1993, to critical and subsequently prize-winning acclaim. The cover art for the book, Portrait in Oil, by Gillian Griffiths was exhibited in the Celf pavilion at the 1994 National Eisteddfod in Neath. The novel is largely set in the Neath valley. Parthian's second title, Tilting at Windmills: New Welsh Short Fiction, was released in 1995. Edited by Ravi Pawar, Tilting at Windmills was a volume of twelve short stories, with each contribution drawn from successful submissions to the Rhys Davies Short Story Competition. The competition itself was launched by the Rhys Davies Trust in 1991. Parthian continues to publish anthologies from this prize and has enjoyed a long and close relationship with the Rhys Davies Trust.

In 1996, the company was incorporated and so began a more regular publication schedule starting with the release of Tree of Crows by Lewis Davies. Other titles released by Parthian in 1996 include From Empty Harbour to White Ocean by Robin Llywelyn, which is the English translation of O'r Harbwr Gwag i'r Cefnfor Gwyn, the winner of the National Eisteddfod Prose Medal in 1994, and Streetlife by playwright and screenwriter Karl Francis. Two years later, in 1998, Parthian launched its Cambrensis Initiative. Supported by the Arts Council of Wales' Arts for All programme, the scheme set out to uncover new Welsh writing talent. The resulting publication, Mama's Baby (Papa's Maybe) and Other Stories: New Welsh Short Fiction, which was released in 2000, was then the largest anthology of contemporary Welsh writing ever to have been published. The volume featured established writers including Alun Richards, Siân James, Leonora Brito, Stevie Davies, and early work by Niall Griffiths, Deborah Kay Davies, John Sam Jones, George Brinley Evans, and a first time in print for a story by Rae (Rachel) Trezise. Parthian continues to receive financial support from the Books Council of Wales in the form of grants.

2000 also saw Parthian publish Rachel Trezise's debut novel, In and Out of the Goldfish Bowl, which won a place on the Orange Futures List in 2001, and the launch of the Parthian Shots series. Three short story collections appeared in Parthian Shots: Flamingos by Gail Hughes, Boys of Gold by George Brinley Evans, and Welsh Boys Too by John Sam Jones. The latter was named a Stonewall Honor Book in Literature in 2002 and hailed by Gay Times as "charming [and] thoughtful". Parthian had previously signalled its commitment to LGBTQ+ literature by publishing Roger Williams' play Gulp in the 1998 collection of New Welsh Drama, Safar, Gulp, My Piece of Happiness edited by Jeff Teare.

=== Growth ===
To celebrate its tenth anniversary in 2003, Parthian organised a competition with the Western Mail, giving the newspaper's readers the chance to win the "Parthian 10", a collection of books by prize-winning writers published by the company. The collection included writers such as Jo Mazelis, Lewis Davies, Rachel Trezise, and John Sam Jones. The New Welsh Review also published a feature article on Lewis Davies and Parthian to mark the company's tenth anniversary, which was written by literary critic John Pikoulis.

In 2005, Parthian won the contract to publish the Library of Wales. Sponsored by the Welsh Government and the Books Council of Wales, and edited by Professor Dai Smith, the project set out to restore to print forgotten or inaccessible classics of Welsh writing in English. Parthian and the Library of Wales were the subject of a major feature by Mario Basini in the Western Mail in 2005, with accompanying photographs by Keith Morris. The first five books in the series were So Long, Hector Bebb (1970) by Ron Berry, Border Country (1960) by Raymond Williams, The Dark Philosophers (1946) by Gwyn Thomas, Cwmardy (1937) and We Live (1939) by Lewis Jones, and Country Dance (1932) by Margiad Evans. In March 2006, Parthian organised the Welsh Writing for the World Week, a showcase of ten Welsh writers held in New York City. As part of the festival, Parthian presented the New York Public Library with a copy of the Library of Wales series. A donation of the Library of Wales volumes was also made to Wexford County Libraries in 2010, as part of a literary exchange between Wales and Ireland.

The launch of the Bright Young Things series in September 2010 marked the beginning of a new phase of talent spotting by Parthian, with debut releases by Jemma L King, Tyler Keevil, Susie Wild, JP Smythe and Wil Gritten. Keevil's debut novel, Fireball, was shortlisted for the Guardian's Not The Booker prize in 2011. Ten of the Best, an anthology of poetry featuring Mab Jones, Alan Kellermann, Anna Lewis, M. A. Oliver-Semenov and Siôn Tomos Owen, followed in 2011. Full poetry collections from Kellermann and Lewis were published in 2012. Collections from Oliver-Semenov and Owen were released in 2016.

In 2012, Parthian began publishing Cheval, the annual Terry Hetherington Award anthology of short stories. Many of the winners of this award, including Mari Ellis Dunning, Natalie Ann Holborow, Jemma L. King and João Morais, have since released debut publications with Parthian. By the time of Parthian's twentieth anniversary in 2013, the company had published more than two hundred books.

Parthian celebrated its twenty-fifth anniversary in 2018 with a showcase at the London Book Fair. In 2021, the publisher launched its first podcast with episodes devoted to Welsh queer writing. An exhibition to mark Parthian's thirtieth anniversary was held at the museum at St Dogmael's Abbey, Pembrokeshire, in January and February 2023.

== Imprints and Series ==
=== Library of Wales ===
Launched by the Welsh Government and the Books Council of Wales at the Hay Festival in 2005, the Library of Wales is a project designed to restore to print the "rich and extensive literature in Wales that has been written in English". Fifty titles were released during the founding editorship of Dai Smith.

Library of Wales Titles
Series Number	Title	Author
1	So Long, Hector Bebb	Ron Berry
2	Border Country	Raymond Williams
3	The Dark Philosophers	Gwyn Thomas
4	Cwmardy	Lewis Jones
5	Country Dance	Margiad Evans
6	A Man's Estate	Emyr Humphreys
7	Home to an Empty House	Alun Richards
8	In the Green Tree	Alun Lewis
9	Ash on a Young Man's Sleeve	Dannie Abse
10	Poetry, 1900-2000	Meic Stephens (editor)
11	Sport	Gareth Williams (editor)
12	The Withered Root	Rhys Davies
13	Rhapsody	Dorothy Edwards
14	Jampot Smith	Jeremy Brooks
15	The Voices of the Children	George Ewart Evans
16	I Sent a Letter to My Love	Bernice Rubens
17	Congratulate the Devil	Howell Davies
18	The Heyday in the Blood	Geraint Goodwin
19	The Alone to the Alone	Gwyn Thomas
20	The Caves of Alienation	Stuart Evans
21	A Rope of Vines	Brenda Chamberlain
22	Black Parade	Jack Jones
23	Dai Country	Alun Richards
24	The Valley, The City, The Village	Glyn Jones
25	The Great God Pan	Arthur Machen
26	The Hill of Dreams	Arthur Machen
27	The Battle to the Weak	Hilda Vaughan
28	Turf or Stone	Margiad Evans
29	Make Room for the Jester	Stead Jones
30	The Volunteers	Raymond Williams
31	All Things Betray Thee	Gwyn Thomas
32	Goodbye, Twentieth Century	Dannie Abse
33	Flame and Slag	Ron Berry
34	The Water-Castle	Brenda Chamberlain
35	A Kingdom	James Hanley
36	Autobiography of a Super-Tramp	W. H. Davies
37	Story I	Dai Smith (editor)
38	Story II	Dai Smith (editor)
39	A Time to Laugh	Rhys Davies
40	Young Emma	W. H. Davies
41	We Live	Lewis Jones
42	Carwyn	Alun Richards
43	Old Soldiers Never Die	Frank Richards
44	Old Soldier Sahib	Frank Richards
45	Farewell Innocence	William Glynne-Jones
46	Ride the White Stallion	William Glynne-Jones
47	Dat's Love and Other Stories	Leonora Brito
48	The Element of Water	Stevie Davies
49	In and Out of the Goldfish Bowl	Rachel Trezise
50	Selected Stories	Rhys Davies

In 2022, a new phase of the Library of Wales began with additional titles and a new cover design. The first volume to be launched was Charlotte Williams' memoir Sugar and Slate. Subsequent titles to be released in 2023 include Christopher Meredith's Shifts and Nigel Heseltine's A Day's Please and Other Tales.

=== Parthian Europa Carnivale ===
The Parthian Europa Carnivale series, or PEC, is a collection of fiction and poetry from contemporary European women writers. The series began with Eluned Gramich's translation of Goldfish Memory by Swiss writer Monque Schwitter in the spring of 2015. Subsequent releases include Ece Temelkuran's Women Who Blow On Knots translated from Turkish by Alexander Dawe; Uršuľa Kovalyk's The Equestrienne translated from Slovak by Julia and Peter Sherwood; Karmele Jaio's My Mother's Hands translated from Basque by Kristin Addis; Alys Conran’s Pigeon, which was translated into Welsh as Pijin; Emilia Ivancu’s Washing My Hair With Nettles translated from Romanian by Diarmuid Johnson; Miren Agur Meabe’s A Glass Eye translated from Basque by Amaia Gabantxo; and Rebecca F. John’s Clown’s Shoes. The titles in the series have picked up a number of prestigious awards, among them the PEN International New Voices Award and the Wales Book of the Year.

=== Parthian Baltics ===
To coincide with the Baltic market focus of the 2018 London Book Fair and to celebrate "the distinct identities, characteristics and strengths which have grown from each nation's unrest", Parthian launched its Parthian Baltics. The series includes translations into English of works from Estonia, Latvia and Lithuania. Writers published in the series include Alberts Bels, Eeva Park and Krišjānis Zeļģis.

=== Parthian Modern ===
The Parthian Modern series, which was launched in 2020, showcases prize-winning highlights from Parthian's contemporary fiction backlist. Republished titles are accompanied by newly commissioned introductions. Titles include Work, Sex and Rugby by Lewis Davies, Kiss and Tell: Selected Stories by John Sam Jones, Boys of Gold by George Brinley Evans, Cardiff Cut by Lloyd Robson, Fresh Apples by Rachel Trezise, Martha, Jack & Shanco by Caryl Lewis, and Grace, Tamar and Laszlo the Beautiful by Deborah Kay Davies.

=== Modern Wales ===
The Modern Wales series, edited by Dai Smith, was created in 2016 as a collaboration between Parthian Books and the Rhys Davies Trust. The titles published so far are:

Modern Wales Series
Year	Title	Author
2017	To Hear the Skylark's Song	Huw Lewis
2017	Merthyr: The Crucible of Modern Wales	Joe England
2018	Rocking the Boat: Welsh Women Who Championed Equality, 1840-1990	Angela V. John
2018	Labour Country: Political Radicalism and Social Democracy in South Wales, 1831-1985	Daryl Leeworthy
2019	Brenda Chamberlain: Artist and Writer	Jill Piercy
2019	Rhys Davies: A Writer’s Life	Meic Stephens
2019	Wales: England’s Colony?	Martin Johnes
2020	Kisses Sweeter Than Wine	Boyd Clack
2021	Between Worlds: A Queer Boy from the Valleys	Jeffrey Weeks
2021	Smooth Operator: The Life and Times of Cyril Lakin, Editor, Broadcaster and Politician	Geoff Andrews
2021	Miner’s Day	B. L. Coombes (ed. Peter Wakelin)
2021	Raymond Williams: From Wales to the World	Stephen Woodhams (ed.)
2022	Fury of Past Time: A Life of Gwyn Thomas	Daryl Leeworthy

== Translation ==
Parthian Books works in partnership with Il Caduceo literary agency in Genoa who represents their writers in translation. Parthian has developed translation links throughout Europe and beyond, and its books have appeared in fifteen foreign language editions including French, Italian, Spanish, Arabic, Turkish, Danish, Portuguese and Russian. Parthian has also recently announced its first book deal with New Star publications in China for the thriller The Colour of a Dog Running Away by Richard Gwyn.

As with his debut short fiction collection, All The Places We Lived, the Serbian language rights for Richard Owain Roberts' debut novel, The Guardian's Not The Booker prize winning Hello Friend We Missed You, have been acquired by Partizanska Knjiga, the first time Parthian Books have sold foreign translation rights ahead of English language publication. According to the publishing editor, "Roberts follows Jarett Kobek, Ben Lerner and Miranda July as the latest English-language novelist to have his work translated into Serbian."

Parthian also publishes titles translated into English from Basque, Catalan, German, Spanish and Welsh, including To Bury the Dead by Ignacio Martínez de Pisón, Under the Dust by Jordi Coca, The Bridge Over the River by Johannes Gramich, Strange Language: An Anthology of Basque Short Stories edited by Mari Jose Olaziregi, and Martha, Jac and Shanco by Caryl Lewis. In 2015, the publisher launched the Europa Carnivale series, with the intention of releasing translations of works originally published in German, Polish, Slovak, Spanish and Turkish.

In 2016, Parthian was awarded money by the India Wales Fund for a collaborative literature project called The Valley, The City, The Village. The project saw the publication in 2018 of a writing anthology curated by three Welsh writers and three Indian writers. In early 2017, the three Welsh writers visited India to engage with the culture and take part in writing and reading events. In spring 2017, the three Indian authors will visit Wales. The project was run in collaboration with Bee Books, an English publisher in Kolkata, India. The writers blogged about their experiences, and made use of them for an anthology.

== Notable Writers ==
Some of the many authors that Parthian Books has published include Richard Owain Roberts, Auguste Courteau, Alys Conran, Peter Lord, Cynan Jones, Rebecca F. John, Tristan Hughes, Jemma L King, Deborah Kay Davies, Max Boyce, Professor Dai Smith, Rachel Trezise, Susmita Bhattacharya, Lewis Davies, Glen Peters and Jeni Williams.

== Awards ==
Since its foundation in 1993, Parthian and its titles have regularly received recognition through award nominations and prizes. Lewis Davies won the John Morgan Travel Writing Award for Freeways: A Journey West on Route 66 in 1997. Rachel Trezise won an Orange Futures Award in 2001 for her debut In and Out of the Goldfish Bowl. Welsh Boys Too by John Sam Jones was named as a Stonewall Honor Book in Literature by the LGBT American Library Association in 2002 and in 2003, Lewis Davies’ Work, Sex and Rugby picked up the World Book Day, We Are What We Read Award for Wales. The Long Dry, the debut novel by Cynan Jones, won the Betty Trask Award in 2007. Ece Temelkuran's Women Who Blow on Knots won the Edinburgh International Book Festival's First Book Award in 2017.

In 2006, Rachel Trezise became the first recipient of the Dylan Thomas Prize for her short story collection, Fresh Apples. Following this success, two further Parthian titles have been nominated for the prize: Jemma L. King’s poetry collection The Shape of a Forest in 2013, and Alys Conran’s novel Pigeon in 2017.

Parthian has also enjoyed success in the Wales Book of the Year, an award given annually to the best Welsh and English language works by Welsh or Welsh interest authors. Deborah Kay Davies gave the publisher its first win in 2009, with her short story collection Grace, Tamar and Laszlo the Beautiful. Further wins followed in 2011 (with John Harrison’s Cloud Road) and in 2017 (with Alys Conran’s Pigeon). Parthian titles have also been successfulin the Creative Non-Fiction category of the Wales Book of the Year since its creation in 2012. The publisher's first win in this category came in 2014 (with Meic Stephens Rhys Davies: A Writers Life) and has been followed by wins in 2017 (with Peter Lord’s The Tradition), and in 2022 (with John Sam Jones The Journey is Home: Notes from a Life on the Edge). Parthian’s record of three overall Wales Book of the Year awards is matched by Faber, and only bettered by Seren.

Many award-winning individual short stories and poems have been later included in Parthian collections. These include, most notably, 'Mr. Roopratna's Chocolate' from Lewis Davies' Love and Other Possibilities, which won the Rhys Davies Prize in 1999, and 'Moon Dog' from Rebecca F John's Clown's Shoes, which won the PEN International New Voices Award in 2015.

In 2020, Richard Owain Roberts won The Guardian's Not the Booker Prize for his debut novel Hello Friend We Missed You. The competition judge, Sam Jordison, described it as "the gem of the shortlist" and as "formally daring, very funny, a writer of real talent and potential."
