= Owen Thomas =

Owen Thomas may refer to:

== People ==
- Owen Thomas (journalist), UK radio and television reporter/presenter
- Owen Thomas (writer) (born 1972), former editor of Valleywag
- Owen Thomas (politician) (1858–1923), MP for Anglesey, 1918–1923
- Owen Thomas (darts player) (born 1953), Welsh darts player
- Owen Thomas (playwright) (born 1976), Welsh playwright
- Owen John Thomas (1939–2024), Plaid Cymru politician
- Owen Thomas, University of Pennsylvania football player and subject of a ground-breaking study on chronic traumatic encephalopathy
- Owen Thomas, lead singer in American rock band The Elms

== Other ==
- Owen Thomas (automobile company), founded in 1908 in Janesville, Wisconsin

== See also ==
- Dudley Owen-Thomas (born 1948), English lawyer and former first-class cricketer
