= Richard Owain Roberts =

Welsh author (born 1982)

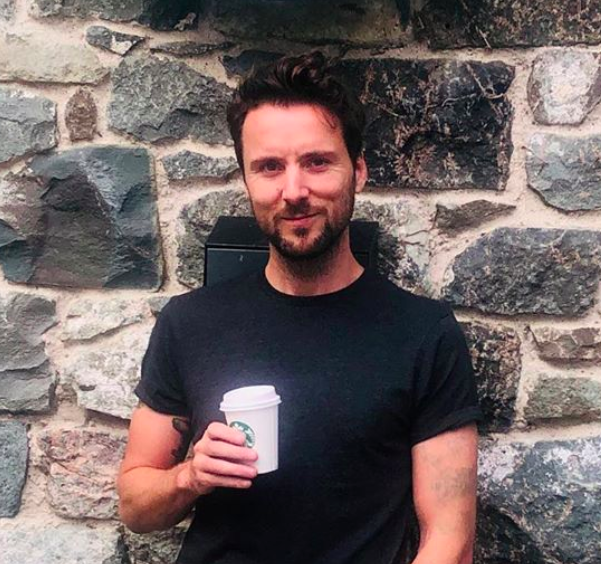
- Born: 1982 (age 43–44); Anglesey (Ynys Môn), Wales
- Occupation: Author
- Writing career
- Language: English, Welsh
- Genres: Fiction, non-fiction, plays
- Notable works: All The Places We Lived (2015), Hello Friend We Missed You (2020)
- Notable awards: Not The Booker (2020), Penfro short story prize (2019)

Richard Owain Roberts (born 1982) is a Welsh author. He is the author of the novel Hello Friend We Missed You, which has been hailed as "a turning point for Welsh fiction", and the short story collection All The Places We Lived.

Hello Friend We Missed You won the 2020 Not The Booker prize in a "stunning victory that, for the English literary establishment at least, seemed to come from nowhere".

There has been international interest in adapting his work for film and television.

Known for his elusive reputation, Roberts has been described as "an important new voice in fiction, not just in Wales" and an "authentic interpreter of contemporary hipster hell".

Roberts is a supporter of Welsh independence and is a member of the non-party affiliated YesCymru movement.

== Early life and education ==
Roberts was born and raised on Anglesey (Ynys Môn), his first language is Welsh and he has made a point of refusing to recognise the name Anglesey in interviews or his work.

Describing his time on Anglesey (Ynys Môn), Roberts said: "It was very tranquil and idyllic but also it's one of the most deprived places in Wales. I wasn't fully aware of this at the time, it was probably just normal to me. A lot of people at my school arrived in Jaguars and Range Rovers but my friend and I used to show up in an old Lada. Seems really defiant somehow. I don't know."

Roberts studied English literature at the University of Manchester before joining the creative writing MA programme at Liverpool John Moores University and more recently Bennington College

== All The Places We Lived ==
All The Places We Lived was published by Parthian Books in May 2015. Roberts said he wrote most of the book at Chapter Arts Centre while listening to Kanye West: "I listened to 808 & Heartbreak during the writing period for All The Places We Lived and then Yeezus during editing."

The book features a story about two characters named Kanye and Kim, who many reviewers have taken to be West and his wife Kim Kardashian. It also features characters called James, Dave and Betsy Lou Franco and Eazy-E.

Wales Arts Review selected it as one of their summer reads for 2015, João Morais stating that, "Read it if you like the understated satirical style of Bret Easton Ellis, or read it if you understand how Frank and April Wheeler can feel both alone yet together in Richard Yates' Revolutionary Road. But more than anything, read it if you like great fiction."

Bridey Heing, writing for Sabotage Reviews, stated that, "For the author, being human means a very particular brand of self-sabotage and misanthropy... he is more of an observer, documenting each interaction and each movement without commentary. His prose balances starkness with a unique lyricism borne of repetition, a flowing sort of growth from sentence to sentence. The writing is lean, with no extra filler to soften its harsh edges."

Cult book review website Workshy Fop stated that, "Roberts creates strange, disjointed narratives; his prose features lists, brutally short sentences, social media updates and offbeat pop-culture references. The vignettes presented in All The Places We Lived reflect the influence of social media and marketing on our perception of the world and the people around us, with a darkly comic humour."

In an essay, which he worked on with essayist Chelsea Hodson before publishing in his newsletter, Roberts accused an unnamed writer of releasing a "total shitshow of a novel" which was "a clear aping of the style" of his collection.

== Serbia tour and Terrence Malick ==
The Serbian translation of All The Places We Lived was released in November 2017 by Serbian publishing house Partizanska Knjiga. In his foreword, an essay titled "Kim is Offline", the novelist and critic Srđan Srdić described Richard Owain Roberts as a natural successor to David Foster Wallace. The forthcoming documentary, ULTRA, is set to cover Roberts' time in Serbia promoting the translation.

In September 2019, Roberts won the Penfro short story prize, judged by Niall Griffiths, for his story Terrence Malick. Writing in Wales Arts Review, Nigel Jarrett described the story as, "fresh, fugitive, dreamlike, yet one in which the writer is in complete control of the aesthetic".

In a review for Nation.Cymru, Jon Gower compared Roberts' writing to Paul Auster and said, "shot through with references to popular culture, cocaine and Pringles, the story acts as a playful, edgy advert for Roberts' forthcoming debut novel".

The Zero Point Fiction podcast has released an episode with Roberts reading the story.

== Hello Friend We Missed You ==
Robert's second book Hello Friend We Missed You was published by Parthian Books in May 2020 and won The Guardian's Not The Booker Prize in October 2020 with the competition organiser Sam Jordison writing "The net result is a novel that has impressed me more than any other on our shortlist. I do believe we've found a gem."

It is described by the publisher as: "A deeply poignant and bleakly comic debut novel about loneliness, the "violent revenge thriller" category on Netflix, solipsism, rural gentrification, Jack Black, and learning to exist in the least excruciating way possible."

The Irish Times included it on a list of "books to watch out for" from independent publishers in 2020.

Anthony Cummins writing for Literary Review, having made comparisons with Tao Lin and Martin Amis, said of the novel, "[it] is recognisably alt-lit in style and sensibility, but with the benefit of added heart. Above all, it succeeds because of Roberts's gift for comic timing and for dialogue that rings true – or "rings true", I should say."

Kirkus Reviews described the novel as "a witty, irony-rich coming-of-age story" and a "brisk, surprisingly deep debut novel" that "recalls Roddy Doyle, albeit at more of an emotional remove."

Duncan B Barlow, formerly of legendary cult punk band Endpoint, writing for Vol.1 Brooklyn wrote, "It's Roberts' writing that really makes the story something special—a steady pulse of short sections and tightly wrought sentences which develop a rhythm that ripples forward in a wake of momentum, carrying the story forward with a delightful quickness."

The novel was described in Wales Arts Review as "a witty and imaginative reflection on grief, loss and the importance of moving forward". New Welsh Review compared Roberts to Bret Easton Ellis and said he was "able to perfectly capture the nihilism and pop culture of the adult millennial generation." Hello Friend We Missed You was later shortlisted for the Wales Arts Review Book of the Year prize, with the final award eventually going to the recently deceased Jan Morris for her non fiction collection Thinking Again.

In August 2020, the novel was included on The Guardian's Not the Booker prize longlist alongside such contemporaries as Jenny Offill, Garth Greenwell, Brandon Taylor and Rob Doyle. It then survived a voting process to be included on a six-book shortlist. Speaking after being nominated, Roberts said: "I am very happy for anyone to email me, and my idea now is to continue and focus in this moment."

On announcing Hello Friend We Missed You as the winner in October, Sam Jordison stated, "At the end of this process, we have a worthy winner. Hello Friend We Missed You is just the kind of book we hope to find with the Not the Booker prize. It's a title that has not yet been widely reviewed, from a small publisher and – most importantly – by a writer of real talent and potential. It took me by surprise when I read it, and it's haunted me ever since. Its formally daring, with clipped sentences, short elliptical chapters, and almost impressionistic streams of thought. It's also very funny. (The title itself turns out to be a fine joke about Domino's Pizza.) But it's the emotional complexity and gentle melancholy of the book that endures. It's a moving experience – and that matters. Especially in a difficult year such as this one."

The BBC Radio Review Show described Hello Friend We Missed You as "a turning point in Welsh fiction"

As with Roberts' short fiction debut All The Places We Lived, the Serbian language rights for Hello Friend We Missed You have been acquired by Partizanska Knjiga, the first time Parthian Books have sold foreign translation rights ahead of English language publication. According to the publisher, "Roberts follows Jarett Kobek, Ben Lerner and Miranda July as the latest English-language novelist to have his work translated into Serbian."

A video of Roberts reading from the novel was published by Wales Arts Review, along with a short clip of ULTRA, as part of its Digithon festival, organised in response to the coronavirus pandemic.

The novel was included by Tao Lin on a list of books he read in 2021, with praise for the "narrator's comically detached confusion".

In February 2023, the Italian translation of Hello Friend We Missed You was published by Rome based Italian publishing house Eliott Edizioni and was subsequently chosen by Grazia as one of its recommended book selections for March.

== Personal life and controversies ==
Roberts, a fitness enthusiast, is known for the catchphrase "will say more later, after my run," which is also the name of his newsletter.

In an interview with the Serbian cultural and political magazine NIN (magazine) Roberts stated his preference for partaking in MMA over sedentary activities.

After the release of his first book, Roberts was "involved in a couple of spats that played out in the public forum". Roberts' evasive and truculent approach to answering questions saw him compared to Joffrey Baratheon from the Game of Thrones television series.

Roberts, who is a vegan, currently lives in Cardiff with his wife, daughters, and cat, Abi The God. He has worked as a teacher at Cardiff prison as well as delivering leaflets for "less than minimum wage". Outside of writing, Roberts likes to "read sports management biographies on my wife's Kindle, look at Jaden and Willow's Twitter, walk aimlessly around Mount Chiliad trying to befriend the wildlife".

== See also ==
- List of Welsh writers
- List of YesCymru members
- List of vegans
