= Susie Wild =

British writer (born 1979)

- Born: 28 June 1979 (age 47); London, England
- Education: Swansea University; University of London
- Occupation: Writer
- Writing career
- Language: English
- Period: 2010–
- Website: www.susiewild.blogspot.co.uk

Susie Wild or Susie Wildsmith (born 28 June 1979) is an English poet, short story writer, journalist and editor based in Wales. She is currently publishing editor at Parthian Books, specialising in fiction and poetry.

== Biography ==
Susie Wild is author of two poetry collections (Better Houses and Windfalls), the short story collection The Art of Contraception and the novella Arrivals. Released in 2010, The Art of Contraception was her first solo publication, and won 'Fiction Book of the Year' in the Welsh Icons Awards 2010. It was also listed for the Edge Hill Prize.

Her work has recently featured in Carol Ann Duffy's pandemic project Write Where We Are Now, The Atlanta Review, Ink, Sweat & Tears and Poetry Wales. She placed second in the Welshpool Poetry Festival Competition 2020, was highly commended in the Prole Laureate Prize 2020, was shortlisted for an Ink Sweat & Tears Pick of the Month 2020 and longlisted in the Mslexia Women's Poetry Competition 2018. Born in London, she lives in Cardiff.

Wild is Parthian's publishing editor, specialising in poetry and fiction. With Parthian since 2007, she's worked with award-winning writers including Mari Elis Dunning, Lloyd Markham and Rebecca F. John. In 2025, off the back of their new publishing partnership with Parthian, Wild was appointed the new editor of the long-standing Welsh literary journal New Welsh Review.

Following an MA in creative writing from Swansea University and an MA in journalism from Goldsmiths, Wild has also built a portfolio career in the arts as a journalist, festival and events organiser, performer, editor and university lecturer.

== Publications ==
=== Fiction ===
- The Art of Contraception (2010)
- Arrivals (2011)

=== Poetry ===
- Better Houses (2017)
- Windfalls (2021)
