= Jo Mazelis =

Welsh writer (born 1956)

Jo Mazelis (born 1956) is a Welsh writer. Her 2014 novel Significance was awarded the Jerwood Fiction Uncovered Prize 2015. Her short story collections have been short- or long-listed for prizes, including Wales Book of the Year. She has also worked as a professional graphic designer.

== Biography ==
Mazelis was born near Fairwood Common on the Gower Peninsula. She grew up in Swansea, later living in Aberystwyth and then London for over 14 years before returning to her hometown. She worked as a graphic designer for Spare Rib, Undercurrents, Women’s Review, Everywoman and City Limits. She did a Foundation Course at Swansea College of Art, and was awarded a Higher Datec Diploma from Ealing College of Higher Education, a degree in Art & English from Swansea Metropolitan University and an MA in English Literature from Swansea University.

Mazelis was a Royal Literary Fund fellow at Swansea University 2009-11 and is currently a lector on the Royal Literary Fund Reading Round in Swansea.

== Writing ==
Mazelis's first collection of short stories, Diving Girls (2002), was shortlisted for both Wales Book of the Year and Commonwealth Best First Book.

Her second collection of stories, Circle Games (2005), was long-listed for Wales Book of the Year.

In 2014, Mazelis wrote a collection of surreal dystopian fiction for Go! Be a Bird!, a collaborative work with award-winning artist Susan Adams. She also published the novel Significance (2014), which was awarded the 2015 Jerwood Fiction Uncovered Prize.

Mazelis's third collection, Ritual, 1969 (2016), was long-listed for the Edge Hill Short Story Prize and shortlisted for Wales Book of the Year in 2017.

In 2025 Mazelis published the novel The Forger’s Ink, looking at the story of the death of Fanny Imlay, half-sister of Mary Shelley and daughter of Mary Wollstonecraft.

In September 2026 Mazelis launches Repercussions, a collaboration with artist Susan Adams. The book is "an experimental exchange of letters and drawings sent through the post over several months".

Several of Mazelis's stories have also been broadcast on BBC Radio 4 including Too Perfect, Snakeskin Becomes Her and The Blackberry Season.

Mazelis's work has appeared in The Lonely Crowd, New Welsh Review, Spare Rib, Poetry Wales, Raconteur, Cambrensis, Nth Position, The Big Issue, Corridor, The Ottawa Citizen, Everywoman, Tears in the Fence and Lampeter Review amongst others.

== Reviews ==
Reviewing Circle Games, Anna Scott in the New Welsh Review wrote, "Mazelis plays with the reader, introducing the unexpected by the back door. Fearlessly scrutinising the desires and impulses of her characters, segueing nightmarish fantasies into reality."

Reviewing Ritual, 1969, Rupert Dastur in The Short Story wrote, "Mazelis explores a dazzling range of ideas, geographies and times, often couched in the daily realities of women and children, the marginalised and the powerless, the scared, hopeless, and hapless ... Ritual, 1969 reveals the absolute mastery Mazelis has over the short form and this third collection is a superb display of a writer keenly attentive to the human mind, its motives and its mysteries."

== Photography ==
While working for magazines in London in the 1980s Mazelis photographed writers such as P.D. James, Patricia Highsmith. and Kathy Acker, artists Paula Rego and Nan Goldin, and actors Miranda Richardson and Tilda Swinton, amongst others. Mazelis photographed John Stevens and Dudu Pukwana on a number of occasions, notably while they were recording the album, Radebe: They Shoot to Kill. Since returning to Wales she has photographed a number of Welsh artists and writers including Ed Thomas, Francesca Rhydderch, Lloyd Robson, Kevin Sinnott, David Hurn, Rachel Trezise, Richard Davies, Tristan Hughes, Rhian Elizabeth and musicians Richard Cowell (Rag Foundation) and Paul Battenbough.

Mazelis has exhibited her artwork at Camerawork, London and the Glynn Vivian Art Gallery, and had solo exhibitions at The Camera Club, London and The Dylan Thomas Centre, and a joint show at the Pontardawe Arts Centre. Her photography has been used for a variety of publications from online journals to print magazine covers and book jackets.

== Film ==
In the 1980s Mazelis collaborated as a screenwriter for a student film in which she also acted. She also acted in a Super 8 film The Fate of Cain made by Barry Assinder which was shown at the London Film Festival.

== Selected publications ==
- Diving Girls (short stories, Parthian, 2002; published in Danish translation as Forbuden Frugt by Arvids, 2007)
- Circle Games (short stories, Parthian, 2005)
- Significance (novel, Seren, 2014)
- Ritual, 1969 (short stories, Seren, 2016)
- Skin and other short stories (short stories, CPI Group, 2022)
- Blister and Other Stories (as JK Mazelis) (short stories, Redrobe Books, 2022)

== Awards and honors ==
Mazelis has won a prize in the Rhys Davies Short Story Award five times, was longlisted for the Asham Award and received prizes in the PenFRO and Allen Raine competitions.

Mazelis was shortlisted for the 2023 in the short fiction category for her book

Year	Title	Award	Result	Ref.
2002	Diving Girls	Wales Book of the Year	Shortlist	
2002	Diving Girls	Commonwealth Best First Book	Shortlist	
2005	Circle Games	Wales Book of the Year	Longlist	
2015	Significance	Jerwood Fiction Uncovered Prize	Winner	
2016	Ritual, 1969	Edge Hill Short Story Prize	Longlist	
2017	Ritual, 1969	Wales Book of the Year	Shortlist	
2023	Blister and Other Stories	International Rubery Book Award	Shortlist	
