= Ron Berry =

Welsh writer (1920–1997)

- Born: Ronald Anthony Berry; 23 February 1920; Blaencwm, Rhondda
- Died: 16 July 1997 (aged 77); Pontypridd, Wales
- Occupations: Miner, author
- Spouse: Rene (née Jones)
- Writing career
- Period: 1930s–1990s
- Genres: Short stories, novels, non fiction
- Website: www.ronberry.co.uk

Ronald Anthony Berry (23 February 1920 – 16 July 1997) was a Welsh author of novels and short stories. Born in the Rhondda Valleys where he remained for most his life, his books reflect the working class of the industrial valleys though his vision is more optimistic and there is less concern for politics and religion which was expressed by many of his contemporaries.

Although largely overlooked during his lifetime, Berry has been embraced by contemporary Welsh authors including Rachel Trezise and Niall Griffiths, and also by contemporary researchers.

== Personal history ==
Berry was born in 1920 in Blaencwm, a small village at the head of the Rhondda Fawr. The son of a coal miner, Berry left school at the age of 14, and he too took employment at a local colliery. He remained a coal miner until the outbreak of World War II where he served in the British Army and later in the Merchant Navy.

Berry undertook several roles in his younger days, including amateur boxing and also played association football for Swansea Town, reportedly scoring a vital goal in a cup match. Though a knee injury in 1943 ended his sporting career. He later became a carpenter, working around Wales and in London. He married Rene Jones in 1948, with whom he had five children, two sons and three daughters. He took up various jobs, and wrote some early essays and poetry for which he was unable to find a publisher. In the 1950s, Berry studied at Coleg Harlech, a further education college in Gwynedd. There he became an avid reader and honed his left-wing political views. A failed attempt to enter teacher training college saw he and Rene return to the Rhondda, taking up residence in Treherbert. It was in Treherbert, where he took on a job as the assistant manager of the local swimming baths, that he first began writing his first published novels.

His written works were never successful enough to allow Berry to be financially secure and in the 1970s he relied on several friends, and the support of Sir Wyn Roberts in obtaining for him a Civil list pension. In his later life he was plagued with arthritis and poor health and he died in Pontypridd in 1997.

== Written work ==
Berry's first work was Hunters and Hunted (1960), which followed the sexual adventures of three men over three seasons in a Welsh valley. It received good reviews. Over the next ten years he published a further four novels, Travelling Loaded (1963), The Full-Time Amateur (1966), Flame and Slag (1968) and So Long, Hector Bebb (1970). After So Long, Hector Bebb, Berry's published output waned. He wrote an account of watching peregrine falcons in the upper Rhondda 1987, entitled Peregrine Watching. Berry's final novel This Bygone was published in 1996.

The autobiographical History is What you Live was published by Gomer in 1998) and an edited collection of short stories, Collected Stories (2000) were both released posthumously.

Berry also wrote several short stories and essays, and wrote several plays for BBC television.

So Long Hector Bebb and Flame and Slag were both reprinted by the Library of Wales series in 2006 and 2012.

Berry also left an extensive collection of unpublished writing (including the unpublished novel 'Below Lord's Head Mountain', draft manuscripts, and correspondence, which was deposited at the Richard Burton Archives, Swansea University by Berry's family.

== Writing style ==
Berry's work was deeply-rooted in the south Wales coalfield, in particular the Rhondda Fawr valley.

His work was a shift from the romanticised popular work of Richard Llewellyn and Alexander Cordell, and in an interview criticised 'industrial' authors, including Gwyn Thomas and D H Lawrence, who although he admired their work, wrote of coal mining from above, and 'never sampled the muck and the mire' of working underground. As he stated in History is What You Live, he argued that to be fully understood, 'coal mining had to be experienced day by day, year in and year out, the whole ingested for as long as oxygen fans the skull-mix' in order for the experience of the industry to be adequately expressed in fiction.

Berry wrote with a strong sense of responsibility, as he was driven to write the testimony of the experience of working underground on behalf of his colleagues who were unable to do so. He also wrote on behalf of those afflicted by working underground - both those killed and injured in industrial accidents, and those suffering with lung diseases.

His work is set during the process of the de-industrialisation of the south Wales coalfield; the early novels consider the more prosperous days of the early 1960s, The Full-Time Amateur sees a more affluent working class allowing the workers to purchase televisions, cars and even go abroad on holidays. His later novels however, in particular Flame and Slag, see the closure of mines, and the shift in the labour market as women started to work in factories as men lost their jobs underground. Flame and Slag is also a post-Aberfan novel, featuring a fatal tip slide which engulfs a row of houses.

Regarded as one of the Wales' more significant post-war authors, along with the likes of Glyn Jones and Emyr Humphreys, some critics have shown preference to his short stories, believing that the shorter text constrained his writing away from the sometimes over-lush prose style of his novels.

A perhaps unexpected element of Berry's work is his eco-writing. Both the non-fictional Peregrine Watching and History is What you Live feature a strong engagement with nature, ecology and landscape, and aspects of this also feature in his fictional work. Berry's archive papers also reveal his environmental activism.

== Legacy ==
The Glamorgan County History series describes Berry as "...unjustly neglected... ...whose fiction thrives on those very aspects of Rhondda life that broke the spirit of Gwyn Thomas's imagination."

Despite being largely neglected during his lifetime, modern readers and writers have rediscovered his work. Niall Griffiths cites Berry as one of the most important influences on his writing style, being struck by the vernacular language after discovering a copy of So Long, Hector Bebb at the age of nine. Rachel Trezise also picks out So Long, Hector Bebb as a notable Welsh novel, drawn by the 'fighting, boozing and fornicating' left out of more romanticised novels such as How Green was my Valley.
