= William Glynne-Jones =

Welsh writer in English

- Born: 19 December 1907; Llanelli, Wales
- Died: 26 January 1977 (aged 69); London
- Occupations: Welsh fiction and children's writer, broadcaster and journalist
- Spouse: Doris Jones (née Passmore)
- Children: Edgar Dennis Jones
- Writing career
- Language: English

William Glynne-Jones (1907–1977) was a Welsh fiction and children's writer, broadcaster and journalist. His stories were broadcast weekly on BBC Children's Hour.

== Early life and career ==
He was born and brought up in Llanelli and went to Llanelli Boys' County School. His love of literature and his childhood desire to be a writer was fed by the books read in Llanelli library.

Glynne-Jones left school at 15 and began working at Glanmor Foundry at 16 as a steel-foundry moulder. He left the job at 36, on medical grounds. He was a fluent Welsh speaker, but suffered from a cleft palate and hare lip. While his wife and son remained initially in Wales, he went to London to pursue an ambition to earn his living as a freelance writer and novelist.

His stories for children and adults were broadcast weekly on Children's Hour and regularly on the mid-morning story hour by the BBC. His full name of William Glynne-Jones was necessary to distinguish him from other writers with similar names.

== Writings and writers ==
Glynne-Jones wrote with fidelity and feeling about many aspects of life in industrial South Wales in the 1920s, notably the steel foundries and the Llanelli area. He addressed those who lived there and outsiders.

His circle of literary friends, acquaintances, and correspondents included: Glyn Jones, Doris Lessing, W. Somerset Maugham, George Ewart Evans, Gareth Hughes (a first cousin), Gwyn Jones, Gwyn Thomas, Dylan Thomas, Brian Forbes, Emyr Humphreys, Clifford Evans, Emlyn Williams and Richard Burton.

== Bibliography ==
Glynne-Jones's published work includes four major novels, 12 books for children, Welsh short story collections and school readers for children. A full list of his published work appears here, but more remains in manuscript.

=== Novels ===
- Farewell Innocence (Werner Laurie, 1950)
- Farewell Innocence (reprint, Pan Books, 1973)
  - Reprinted by Parthian Books 2016, National Library of Wales series
- Ride the White Stallion (Werner Laurie, 1951)
  - Reprinted by Parthian Books 2016, National Library of Wales series
- Summer Long Ago (Peter Nevill, 1954)
- The Childhood Land (B. T. Batsford, 1960)

=== Short stories ===
- Welsh Stories. He Who had Eaten of the Eagle (William Maclellan, 1948)

=== Children's books ===
- Grandpa Blanchard's Partisans (Alliance Press 1944)
- Brecon Adventure (Lutterworth Press 1946)
- Brecon Adventure (reprint, Lutterworth Press 1951)
- The Runaway Train (Lutterworth Press, 1945)
- The Mouse and the Cuckoo in the Clock (Charles Skilton 1947)
- Dennis & Co (Frederick Warne, 1947)
- The Trail of Frozen Gold (George G. Harrap, 1949)
- The Magic Forefinger (T. V. Boardman, 1949)
- Pennants on the Main (Frederick Warne, 1950)
- Legends of the Welsh Hills (A. R. Mowbray, 1957)
- Old Time Tales (A. R. Mowbray, 1959)
- Holiday Adventure (Spring Books, 1959)
- The Fox's Cunning (A. R. Mowbray, 1962)

=== School readers ===
- The Golden Boy (Blackie & Son, 1951 – Kingfisher Books Third Series)
- If Pigs Had Wings (Blackie & Son 1954 – Kingfisher Books Third Series)
- The Buccaneers (Thomas Nelson – Nelson's Speedwell Readers)
- Yukon Gold (Tomas Nelson – Nelson's Speedwell Readers)

=== Magazine contributions ===
- Strand Magazine
- Lilliput
- Chambers's Journal
- Welsh Review
- Welsh Short Stories (1959)
- Welsh Life
- Pick of Today's Short Stories
- Wales
- New Short Stories 1945–46
- Dock Leaves
- The Fortnightly
- West Country
- Modern Reading
- Our Time
- Courier
- Adam
- Argosy (United States)
- Esquire (United States),
- New Masses (United States),
- Tomorrow (United States),
- Outspan (South Africa),
- Milady (South Africa),
- Spotlight (South Africa),
- British Ally (Moscow),
- Arabic Listener
- Evening News
- The People
- Evening Standard
- The Western Mail
- Anvil
- She
- Cork Weekly Examiner
- Birmingham Post,
- Weekend,
- Celtic Story,
- Grey Walls Stories,
- Forum
- Trident
- Mayfair
- Curious
- Queen
- Saturday Saga
- Million
- Christian Science Monitor
- The Holiday Book
- BBC
- South African Broadcasting Co.
- New Zealand Broadcasting Service
- Australia Broadcasting Co.

== Awards and recognition ==
Glynne-Jones was awarded a £300 "Atlantic Award" for literature by the Rockefeller Foundation in 1946. He received medals from the University of Southern Mississippi in 1970, 1976 and 1979 for contributions to children's literature. He is also represented in the De Grummond Children's Literature Collection. His name appears on the January 1982 National Geographic map of Novelists of the British Isles. He also features in the Oxford Companion to the Literature of Wales and Author and Writers Who's Who.

In December 2015, a commemorative panel to Glynne-Jones was placed in the foyer of Llanelli Library, honouring his work as an author.

== External sources ==
- Jones, Edgar Dennis; Jones, Lucy Doreen (1995). William Glynne-Jones : 19.12.1907 - 26.01.1977 (paperback). Llanelli, Wales: Llanelli Borough Council. ISBN 0-906821-30-4 – via Trove. (A short biography by his son and daughter in law)
- Llanelli Miscellany 2014, 2015, 2016, 2017, 2018 and 2019
