= David Whitehouse (disambiguation) =

David Whitehouse (1941–2013) was a British archaeologist.

David Whitehouse may also refer to:

- David Whitehouse (writer) (born 1981), British author
- David White House, a historic house in Washington D.C., U.S.
