= Gwen Davies (editor) =

Welsh editor and translator, born 1960s

Gwen Davies (born 1960s) is a Welsh editor and translator. She currently edits the New Welsh Review.

== Background ==
Davies, the youngest of four children in a Welsh-speaking family, was raised in Otley, West Yorkshire, England. Her parents were linguists, her father a published Welsh-language poet.

She currently lives in Aberystwyth with her husband and a son and daughter.

== Career ==
Davies' began her first job in 1985 as a writer/editorial assistant on Planet magazine. She later managed the Welsh-language children's publisher, Cymdeithas Lyfrau Ceredigion, before becoming Literature Officer of the Arts Council of Wales in 1995.

Davies was the original fiction editor of Parthian Books, working on titles such as Rachel Trezise's Fresh Apples, which won the Dylan Thomas Prize in 2006. Davies also edited Alcemi Books, the literary fiction imprint of Y Lolfa.

In 2011, Gwen Davies took over as the editor of the New Welsh Review. She altered the format and appearance of the magazine and included in it regular illustrations by the freelance designer Jamie Hamley.
