= Gwen Davies =

Gwen or Gwendoline Davies may refer to:

- Gwendoline Davies (1882–1951) Welsh arts patron
- Gwen Ffrangcon-Davies (1891–1992) Welsh actress
- Gwen Davies (editor) (born 1964), Welsh editor and translator
- Gwenan Davies (born 1994), Welsh cricketer
- Gwen Watkins (née Davies) (1923–2025), British codebreaker and author

== Fictional characters ==
- Gwen Davies (Days of Our Lives)
- Gwen Davies (Coronation Street)

== See also ==
- Gwen Davis (born 1936), American writer
- Davies (surname)
