= All Things Betray Thee =

1949 novel by Gwyn Thomas

- First edition
- Author: Gwyn Thomas
- Cover artist: 'Nichols'
- Language: English
- Genre: Historical novel
- Publisher: Michael Joseph
- Publication date: 1949
- Media type: Print (book)
- ISBN: 9781908069733
- OCLC: 16529102

All Things Betray Thee, by Gwyn Thomas, is a novel of early industrialism in South Wales. It was first published in 1949, and was republished in 1986, with an introduction by Raymond Williams. The book was later republished as part of the Library of Wales series by Parthian Books in 2011.

Set in 1835, this work is significantly different from most of Gwyn Thomas's work. It is both a personal story and an account of the origin of the industrialised and mostly English-speaking society of the South Wales Valleys.

== Plot summary ==
Set in the new town of Moonlea, a fictionalised version of Merthyr Tydfil, it is told from the viewpoint of a travelling harpist, Alan Hugh Leigh, who is looking for his friend, the singer John Simon Adams. But his friend has become a populist leader among the ironworkers, who are involved in a bitter industrial conflict.

Rachel Trezise describes it as "an emblematic account of the 1831 Merthyr Rising".

== Adaptation ==
All Things Betray Thee was adapted as a three-part radio drama by Alan Plater and directed by Alison Hindell, with Ian Hughes as Alan Hugh Leigh and Patrick Brennan as John Simon Adams. The drama was broadcast on BBC Radio 4 on 24 March – 7 April 1996 and later re-broadcast on BBC Radio 4 Extra in 2019 and 2021.
