= Alys Conran =

Welsh writer

- Occupation: Writer
- Writing career
- Genre: Fiction
- Notable work: Pigeon (2016)
- Notable awards: Wales Book of the Year, 2017
- Website: www.alysconran.com

Alys Conran is a Welsh writer. Her debut novel Pigeon won the Wales Book of the Year in 2017.

== Early life ==
Alys Conran was born in north-west Wales, and is the daughter of the poet and translator Tony Conran. She completed an MA in English literature at the University of Edinburgh in 2004 and an MA in creative writing at the University of Manchester in 2012.

== Career ==
Conran's first novel Pigeon was published by Parthian Books in 2016. A Welsh language adaptation by Siân Northey was published at the same time as the English original, making it the first fiction novel to be simultaneously published in English and Welsh. At the 2017 Wales Book of the Year Awards, the English-language version of Pigeon won the overall prize for Wales Book of the Year, as well as the Wales Arts Review People's Choice Award and the Rhys Davies Trust Fiction Award. It was also shortlisted for the Dylan Thomas Prize and longlisted for the Author's Choice First Novel Award.

In 2018, Conran's second novel Dignity was picked up by Weidenfeld & Nicolson, and published in April 2019. Dignity was shortlisted for the Wales Book of the Year award in 2020.

As of 2026, she is a senior lecturer in creative writing at Bangor University.

== Bibliography ==
=== Novels ===
- Pigeon (2016)
- Dignity (2019)
