= Cynan Jones =

Welsh writer

- Born: Aberaeron, Wales
- Occupation: Writer
- Notable work: The Long Dry (2006), The Dig (2014), Cove (2016)
- Awards: Betty Trask Award, Wales Book of the Year Fiction Prize, BBC National Short Story Award

Cynan Jones (born 1975) is a Welsh writer, who lives and works in Ceredigion. Jones published his first novel, The Long Dry, in 2006. In 2010 he published Le Cose Che Non Vogliamo Più (Things We Don't Want Anymore) in Italian. Since then, he has published four novels, Everything I Found on the Beach (2011), Bird, Blood, Snow (2012), The Dig (2014), and Cove (2016) and a collection of linked short stories, Stillicide (2019). He has also written a collection of children's stories and episodes of the television series Hinterland (TV series). His work has been translated into other languages, and his short stories have appeared in a number of anthologies and publications including Granta, New Welsh Review, and The New Yorker.

Jones's writing has received awards including the Betty Trask Award (2007) and the Wales Book of the Year Fiction Prize (2015). In October 2017, he won the £15,000 BBC National Short Story Award for The Edge of the Shoal.

== Early life ==
Jones was born near Aberaeron, Ceredigion. Before becoming a full-time writer, he worked as a copywriter, a labourer and a kitchen porter, mentored in a behavioural unit and ran a wine shop.

== Career ==
Jones's first novel, The Long Dry, was awarded a 2007 Betty Trask Award. In 2008, the author himself was named as the Hay Festival Scritture Giovani.

In 2011, Jones published his second English language novel, Everything I Found on the Beach (Parthian Books). In 2012, he published Bird, Blood, Snow (Seren Books), one of ten re-workings of stories from The Mabinogion by contemporary Welsh authors, including Gwyneth Lewis and Owen Sheers.

Jones published his next novel, The Dig (Granta Books), in 2014. A chapter from the novel, first published in Granta, was shortlisted for the 2013 Sunday Times Short Story Award. The Dig won a 2014 Jerwood Fiction Uncovered Prize and the 2015 Wales Book of the Year Fiction Prize. The Dig was also on the longlist for the 2014 Kirkus Prize in the US and the 2014 Warwick Prize for Writing.

Jones has also published and broadcast many short stories. The story A Glass of Cold Water aired in May 2014 as part of BBC Radio 4's State of the Nation series. In October 2016, his story The Edge of the Shoal was published in The New Yorker. The story was an extract, re-worked by Jones himself, from his fifth novel, Cove, published in November 2016. In 2017, The Edge of the Shoal won the BBC National Short Story Award.

In 2019, Jones published Stillicide, a collection of 12 linked short stories on the theme of climate crisis set in the near future. The stories were originally broadcast on BBC Radio 4.

In 2016, Jones contributed two episodes to the west Wales-set television detective series Hinterland (TV series).

In 2018, Jones published a collection of stories for children, Three Tales (Gomer Press). Jones has said that with this collection, "he wished to create something akin to the Ladybird Classics he loved as a child".

Jones was elected a Fellow of the Royal Society of Literature in 2019.

== Writing ==
In an interview with Cynan Jones about The Dig, the author spoke about "triggering reactions [in the reader], without being overtly shocking." He also explained his use of more poetic language for some characters over others to keep them apart or "mirror" an aspect of their character. In using "physical and natural allegories" to say things about people, the reader should "understand the reference instinctively." He mentioned writing like "Steinbeck, for example, with The Long Dry".

In another interview, Jones addressed the idea that there is "a natural allegory in the center of [his books] that really informs the human situation". He said that he has to "trust the readers" so that he can do or say things that will "draw the reader's eye" and will not have to "build narratives" that are more like "writing by numbers". When asked about "the saccharine and the violent" that a lot of literature avoids, Jones said that he trusts the reader to have an understanding of the "innate" nature of a situation and all he has to do is "write it down as clearly as I can, and without judgement", more like a witness than a voyeur.

In 2014, Jones made headlines for not punctuating most of the speech in his novel The Dig (and a few other short stories). His characters' speech and ideas had been delineated through quotation marks (inverted commas) until John Freeman, an editor at the magazine Granta, took a chance and removed the speech marks to be "more immediate, more with it". The author agreed on the impact of this unconventional device and finished the rest of the book this way, save for one conversation between the protagonist and his mother. In that passage, Jones used traditional speech marks "to create a sense of a more conventional, staid dialogue." Writers like Cormac McCarthy, James Joyce, and Samuel Beckett have experimented with this same lack of punctuation. By doing so, Jones went against a convention that has predominated since at least the late 18th century.

Jones is best known as a writer of short novels. In an interview with Los Angeles Review, he said, "A short novel is a moment, not a journey. There’s no time to drift off and stare out of the window as there is in longer forms. Everything counts. I love that as a reader, and that’s probably the driving reason behind me gravitating to the form."

== Bibliography ==
- The Long Dry, Parthian Books, 2006. Republished by Granta in 2014 ISBN 1783780401
- Out onto the Water (unpublished in English). In Italian, Le Cose Che Non Vogliamo Più (Things We Don't Want Anymore), 2010
- Everything I Found on the Beach, Parthian Books, 2011. Republished by Granta in 2014 ISBN 1783780428
- Bird, Blood, Snow, Seren Books, 2012 ISBN 1854115898
- The Dig, Granta Books, January 2014 ISBN 9781847088789. Coffee House Press US, 2015 ISBN 1847088805
- Cove, Granta Books, November 2016 ISBN 9781847088819
- Three Tales, Gomer Press, January 2018 ISBN 9781785622335
- Stillicide, Granta Books, October 2019 ISBN 9781783785612. Catapult, November 2020 ISBN 9781646220137
- Pulse, Granta Books, 2025
