= Emyr Humphreys bibliography =

This is a bibliography of some of the novels, the poems and articles of the author Emyr Humphreys and some of the books written about him.

== Novels ==
- The Little Kingdom; Eyre and Spottiswoode, London. (1946). (Translated into Welsh as Darn o Dir by W. J. Jones (Gwilym Fychan); Gwasg Gwynedd, Penygroes (1986))
- The Voice of A Stranger; Eyre and Spottiswoode, London, (1949).
- A Change of Heart; Eyre and Spottiswoode, London. (1951).
- Hear and Forgive; Victor Edlancz, London, (1952).
- A Man's Estate; Eyre and Spottiswoode, London, (1955): Dent, London. (1988); and Parthian, Cardigan (2006) ISBN 9781902638867. (Translated into Welsh as Etifedd y Glyn by W. J. Jones (Gwilym Fychan) Gwasg Gomer (1981) ISBN 978-0850889352. The translation was adapted into a television drama called Brodyr a Chwiorydd (Brothers and Sisters) . Broadcast on S4C between 3 and 24 April 1994 )
- The Italian Wife; Eyre and Spottiswoode, London (1957).
- A Toy Epic; Eyre and Spottiswoode, London, (1958); and Seren, Bridgend, (1989) ISBN 978-1854110091. (Translated into Welsh as Y Tri Llais by Humphreys in 1958 republished by Cyhoeddiadau Mei in 1985 ISBN 978-0905775463
- The Gift; Eyre and Spottiswoode, London, (1963).
- Outside the House of Baal; Eyre and Spottiswoode, London. (1965) and Seren, Bridgend. (1996) ISBN 9781854111029
- The Anchor Tree; Hodder and Stoughton, London, (1980).
- Jones; Dent, London. (1984).
- Unconditional Surrender; Seren Books, Bridgend, (1996) ISBN 9781854111647
- The Gift of a Daughter; Seren, Bridgend, (1998). ISBN 978-1854112224
- The Shop; Seren, Bridgend, (2005). ISBN 978-1854113900

=== The Land of the Living series ===
1. Flesh and Blood; Hodder and Stoughton, London. (1974); Sphere. (1986); and University of Wales Press, Cardiff, (1999). ISBN 978-0708315125
2. The Best of Friends; Hodder and Stoughton, London, (1978) ISBN 978-0340229644; Sphere, (1987) ISBN 9780722142028 and University of Wales Press, Cardiff, (1999)ISBN 9780708315651.
3. Salt of the Earth; Dent, London. (1985) ISBN 978-0460046619; and University of Wales Press, Cardiff. (1999).
4. An Absolute Hero; Dent, London, (1986); Sphere, (1988) ISBN 9780722141922 and University of Wales Press, Cardiff, (2000) ISBN 9780708315934.
5. Open secrets. London: J. M. Dent. 1988. ISBN 978-0-460-04759-3. OCLC 17233457.
6. National Winner; Macdonald, London. (1971) ISBN 978-0356035970; Sphere (1990) ISBN 9780747406112 and University of Wales Press, Cardiff, (2000) ISBN 9780708316511.
7. Bonds of Attachment; University of Wales Press, Cardiff, (2001) ISBN 978-0708316252

== Short stories ==
=== Collections ===
- Natives; Seeker and Warburg, London, (1968) ISBN 978-0436209802
  - A Mystical Experience
  - The Rigours of Inspection**
  - The Hero**
  - The Suspect
  - With All My Heart
  - An Artistic Mission
  - A List of Good People
  - Mels Secret Love"
  - Dinas (City)
  - A Cheerful Note
- Miscellany Two; Poetry Wales Press, Bridgend (1981) ISBN 978-0907476054
  - Boys in a Boat
  - A Corner of a Field
  - Down in the Heel
  - The Arrest
- Ghosts and Strangers; Seren, Bridgend (2001) ISBN 978-1854112996
  - Lady Ramrod
  - Ghosts and Strangers
  - Melina
  - Penrhyn Hen**
- Old People Are a Problem; Seren, Bridgend. (2003) ISBN 978-1854113313
  - Old People Are a Problem
  - Before the War
  - The Man in the Mist
  - The Arrest
  - Sisters
  - An Ethnic Tremor
  - Looking After Ruthie
  - Glasshouses
- The Woman at the Window, Seren, Bridgend (2009) ISBN 9781854114891
  - The Grudge
  - The Woman at the Window
  - Rendezvous
  - The Comet
  - Luigi
  - Vennerberg's Ghost
  - Nomen
  - Home
  - The Ring and the Book
  - The Garden Cottage
  - Three Old Men

=== Individual short stories ===
- The New Statesman:
  - A Girl on the Ice; (1953).
  - The Obstinate Bottle; (1953).
- Welsh Short Stories, ed. G. Ewart Evans; London: Faber. (1959):
  - Mrs Armitage; pp. 246–59.
- The Shining Pyramid. ed. Sam Adams a Roland Mathias; Gwasg Gomer, Llandysul (1970)
  - The Rigours of Inspection; pp. 135–46.
- The Penguin Book of Welsh Short Stories; ed. Alun Richards; Penguin. (1976):
  - Mel's Secret Love; pp. 318–58.
- Mabon I; Gwasg Gee. (1978):
  - The Arrest.
- The Green Bridge, ed. John Davies; Seren, Bridgend. (1988):
  - The Arrest; pp. 197–208.
- The New Penguin Book of Welsh Short Stories, ed. Alun Lewis; Viking. (1993):
  - The Suspect; pp. 243–64.
- Planet:
  - Penrhyn Hen. A Short Story – Part I; (February/ March 1997), pp. 42–57.
  - Penrhyn Hen. A Short Story – Part II; (April/May 1997), pp. 63–74.
  - An Ethnic Tremor; (April/May 1999), pp. 17–26.
  - Vennerberg's Ghost; (April/May 2000), pp. 47–59.
  - Luigi; (June/July 2002), pp. 73–78.
  - Nomen; (June/July 2003), pp. 27–30.
  - The Grudge; (October/November 2006), pp 18–29.
  - Rendezvous; (February/ March 2008). pp. 51–59.

== Poetry ==
- Ancestor Worship; Gwasg Gee, (1970).
- Landscapes: A Sequence of Songs; Chimera Press, (1979) (Music by Alun Hoddinot) ISBN 9780193454323
- Penguin Modern Poets Rhif 27 John Ormond, Emyr Humphreys, John Tripp; Penguin, London:. (1979) ISBN 978-0140421927
- The Kingdom of Bran; Keith Holmes, London (1979).
- Miscellany 2; Poetry Wales Press, Bridgend (1981).
- Collected Poems; University of Wales Press, Cardiff, (1999) ISBN 978-0708315118
- Shards of Light; University of Wales Press, Cardiff, (2018) ISBN 978-1786833518

== Drama ==
- Reg BBC Radio Home Service broadcast 1964. Re-broadcast 5 June 2026 on BBC Radio 4 Extra.
- Outside Time Channel 4 Television (1991) (Broadcast on Channel 4 on 3 September 1991, as Outside Time: Alternative Heroes Directed by his son Siôn Humphreys)

== Non-fiction ==
- Theatr Saunders Lewis (Astudiaethau Theatr Cymru); Cymdeithas Theatr Cymru (1979)
- The Triple Net: A portrait of the writer Kate Roberts 1891–1985; Channel 4 Television, (1988) ISBN 978-1851440078
- The Taliesin Tradition: A Quest for the Welsh Identity; Seren, Bridgend, (1989) ISBN 978-1854112460
- The Crucible of Myth; Swansea University, (1990).
- Dal Pen Rheswm: Cyfweliadau Gydag Emyr Humphreys; (Making Sense: Interviews with Emyr Williams) Jones, R Arwel, University of Wales Press, Cardiff (1999) ISBN 978-0708315613
- Emyr Humphreys: Conversations and Reflections with M. Wynn Thomas ; ed. M. Wynn Thomas; University of Wales Press, Cardiff, (2002). ISBN 978-0708317358

== Papers by Emyr Humphreys and his work ==
- "Replies to "Wales" Questionnaire", Wales, Vol. VI, Nø 23, 26 August 1946, p. 27.
- "A Season in Florence : 1945", Wales, Vol. VI, Nø 24, 1946, pp. 120-124.
- Emyr Humphreys, Wales, Vol. VII, Nø 26, Caernarfon, June 1947, p. 264.
- "Michaels Edwards: The Nationalist at College", Two Chapters from a New Novel, Wales, Vol. VII, Nø 26, 1947, pp. 265-280.
- "Michaels Edwards at College", Chapters Three and Four, Wales, Vol. VII, Nø 27, 1947, pp. 343-363.
- "A Protestant View of the Modern Novel", radio talk recorded at Bangor in March 1953, The Listener, Vol. XLIX, Nø 1257, 2 April 1953, pp. 557-559.
- "The Welsh Novel", Ysgrifennu cyfoes yng Nghymru, I. Y nofel. (Contemporary writing in Wales, I. The novel), Lleufer 18, 1, Wales, 1962, pp.4-8.
- "Outside the House of Baal", Mabon, 1965, pp. 30-40.
- "The Welsh Condition", A Plaid Cymru Publication, reprinted from The Spectator, 28 March 1970, pp. 1-7.
- "The Welsh Condition", Annual Book of the Celtic League, Ed. F.G. Thompson, Eire, 1971, pp. 68-73.
- "In Love with an Island", The Spectator, in Personal Column, 22 August 1970, p. 181.
- "Outline of a Necessary Figure", Presenting Saunders Lewis, Edited by Alun R. Jones and Gwyn Thomas, University of Wales Press, Cardiff, 1973, pp. 6-13.
- "The Loss of Incantation", Welsh Music, Nø4 / 5, 1973 / 1974, pp. 67-73.
- "Two Episodes", Planet, Nø 39, August 1977, pp. 24-34.
- "Poetry, Prison and Propaganda", Planet, Nø 43, June / August 1978, pp. 17-23.
- "The Night of the Fire", Planet, Nø 49 / 50, January 1980, pp. 74-94.
- "Taliesin and Frank Lloyd Wright", Welsh Books & Writers (Llen A Llyfrau Cymru), Published by the Welsh Books Council (Cyngor Llyfrau Cymraeg), Aberystwyth, Dyfed, Wales, Autumn 1980, pp. 3-5.
- "A Perpetual Curate", The Powys Review, Nø8, Vol. II, 1980 / 1981, pp. 22-27, p. 91.
- "Chasing shadows", Arcade, Nø6, 1980 / 1981, p. 21.
- "Of poor Bertolt Brecht", Arcade, Nø17, 26 June / 9 July 1981, pp. 20-21.
- "Faith and a Nation's Fate", Arcade, Nø21, 4 / 17 September 1981, pp. 14-15.
- "The Road to Rhyl", Planet, Nø52, August / September 1985, pp. 81-82.
- "An Absolute Hero: Two chapters (ii / xiv) from Emyr Humphreys's forthcoming novel", Planet, Nø52, August / September 1985, pp. 83-96.
- "The Third Difficulty : Fact and Fiction; the role of the novel in the age of the new media", S.A.E.S. Brest 9-11 mai 1986 - XXVI e Congrès, Université de Bretagne Occidentale, Brest, 1987, pp. 123-132.
- "The Third Difficulty", Pays de Galles, Ecosse, Irlande, Actes du Congrès de Brest - Mai 1986, Cahiers de Bretagne Occidentale, Nø 7, Société des Anglicistes de l'Enseignement Supérieur (S.A.E.S.), Centre de Recherche Bretonne et Celtique, UA 374 du CNRS, Faculté des Lettres et Sciences Sociales, Université de Bretagne Occidentale, Brest, 1987, pp. 3-16.
- "Under the Yoke", The New Welsh Review, Nø 3, Vol. 1, Winter 1988, pp. 9-13.
- "Fragile Threads", An extract from a new novel, Bonds of Attachment, Planet, Nø 77, October / November 1989, pp. 24-32.
- "The Crucible of Myth", W.D. Thomas Memorial Lecture, Published by University College of Swansea, Wales, 21 May 1990, pp. 1-20.
- "A Lost Leader ?", Emyr Humphreys on the Britishness of Huw Wheldon, Planet, Nø83, October / November 1990, pp. 3-11.
- "Open Secrets", in Discovering Welshness, Edited and introduced by Fiona Bowie and Oliver Davies, Published with the support of the Welsh Arts Council, Printed by Gomer Press, 1992, pp. 54-55.
- Emyr Humphreys's interviews, Caernarfon and Denbigh Herald, 12&19 August 1988.

== Books about Emyr Humphreys and his work ==
- Emyr Humphreys (Writers of Wales); Williams Ioan; University of Wales Press, Cardiff, (1980) ISBN 978-0708307502
- Llen y Llenor: Emyr Humphreys; Thomas, M. Wynn; Gwasg y Bwthyn, Caernarfon ISBN 9780000171504
- Approaches to the Study of Emyr Humphreys' "Toy Epic"; Davies, Pam & Nicholas, Mary. Uned Iaith Genedlaethol Cymru (1994) ISBN 978-0946737390
- The Fiction of Emyr Humphreys: Contemporary Critical Perspectives (Writing Wales in English); Peach, Lyndon; University of Wales Press, Cardiff (2011) ISBN 9780708322161
- Emyr Humphreys (Writers of Wales); Thomas, M. Wynn; University of Wales Press, Cardiff, (2018) ISBN 978-1-78683-296-2
- Emyr Humphreys: A Postcolonial Novelist; Green, Diane, Cardiff University of Wales Press (2009) ISBN 978-0-7083-2259-8
- VANUXEEM, Marie, " Crise d'identité dans le roman d'expression anglaise de l'écrivain gallois Emyr Humphreys ", Thèse de doctorat en lettres, Université de Bretagne Occidentale, Faculté des Lettres, Département d'Anglais, Brest, 12 Décembre 1996.

This thesis is available in Wales at the Universities of Aberystwyth, Cardiff, Swansea, and in France at Université de Bretagne Occidentale UBO Brest and at Université de Lille - Atelier National de Reproduction des thèses http://www.diffusiontheses.fr/ .

- Books in French (Ouvrages en français) :

HUMPHREYS, Emyr, Ecoute et pardonne, Roman traduit de l'anglais par Jacques et Jean Tournier, Editions Plon, Collection Feux Croisés, Paris, 1955. Traduction du roman Hear and Forgive, Référence Bibliothèque Nationale : fiche 449, In-16, 277 p. 570 fr. [D.L. 12748-55] [8ø Z. 24-206 (181)] -XcR-.

== Papers about Emyr Humphreys and his work ==
- A Complete Bibliography of Writing about Emyr Humphreys' novels :

HARRIS, John, (Dr), A Bibliographical Guide to Twenty-Four Modern Anglo-Welsh Writers, "Emyr Humphreys", Aberystwyth College of Librarianship, University of Wales Press, Cardiff, 1994, pp. 103-118.

- A Complete Bibliography in the following thesis :

VANUXEEM, Marie, " Crise d'identité dans le roman d'expression anglaise de l'écrivain gallois Emyr Humphreys ", Thèse de doctorat en lettres, Université de Bretagne Occidentale, Faculté des Lettres, Département d'Anglais, Brest, 12 Décembre 1996.

- VANUXEEM, Marie, " Le roman social dans l'oeuvre d'Emyr Humphreys ", Revue d'Etudes Anglophones E-REA 2.2, Université de Provence (LERMA), Automne 2004. https://journals.openedition.org/erea/
- VANUXEEM, Marie, " The Protestant novel in Emyr Humphreys's fiction ", Not published, 2006. (available).
- THOMAS, M. Wynn, Internal Difference, Cardiff University of Wales Press, 1992.
