= New Welsh Review =

Welsh literary magazine

New Welsh Review is a literary magazine published in Wales. Its primary language is English, with brief excerpts of texts indicated in the original Welsh.

== History ==
Founded in 1988 as successor to The Welsh Review (1939–1948), Dock Leaves, and The Anglo-Welsh Review (1949–1988), New Welsh Review publishes articles on literature, theatre, and the arts, as well as interviews, reviews, original short stories, and poetry.

Its focus is on Welsh writing in English, but the journal's outlook also features broad UK and international contexts. Contributors include Dannie Abse, Paul Muldoon, P. D. James, Emyr Humphreys, Leslie Norris, Gwyneth Lewis, Les Murray, Rachel Trezise, Niall Griffiths, Owen Sheers, Terry Eagleton, Edna Longley, Byron Rogers, Gillian Clarke and Paul Groves.

Prior to 2024, New Welsh Review was published quarterly in Aberystwyth with core financial support from the Books Council of Wales. However, in 2024 the Books Council turned down a funding application, leaving the journal in publishing limbo. On St David's Day 2024, the journal announced a partnership with Welsh publisher Parthian Books, securing its future. Parthian would also provide a home for the authors on New Welsh Review's Rarebyte imprint, taking on future authors while also reissuing past titles. Editor Gwen Davies would continue for the first three issues published by Parthian, before stepping down in 2025 to be replaced by Susie Wild. The editorship of Wild began with a redesign of the journal.

== Editors ==
- 1988–1991 Belinda Humfrey
- 1991 Micheal Parnell (died five months after becoming editor)
- 1991–2001 Robin Reeves
- 2001–2002 Victor Golightly
- 2002–2008 Francesca Rhydderch
- 2008–2011 Kathryn Gray
- 2011–2025 Gwen Davies
- 2025– Susie Wild
