= Mari Ellis Dunning =

Welsh writer (born 1993)

- Born: 15 July 1993 (age 33)
- Education: University of Aberystwyth
- Occupation: Writer
- Writing career
- Language: English, Welsh
- Period: 2012–present
- Notable work: Salacia (2018)
- Notable awards: The Terry Hetherington Young Writers Award, 2016
- Website: www.mariellisdunning.cymru

Mari Ellis Dunning (born 15 July 1993) is a Welsh writer based in Aberystwyth. Her debut poetry collection Salacia was shortlisted for the Wales Book of the Year in 2019. She has also published a children's book.

== Early life ==
Mari Ellis Dunning was born on 15 July 1993. She attended University of Aberystwyth, having studying for an MA degree in Creative Writing there.

== Career ==
Dunning's first solo publication was a children's book called Percy the Pom Pom Bear, published simultaneously in Welsh and English. The book was launched on 23 April 2016 at the Abergavenny Writing Festival. Later that year, Dunning won the Terry Hetherington Young Writers Award with her short story 'Cartref'. Her debut poetry collection, Salacia, followed in 2018. Published by Parthian Books, Salacia was later shortlisted for the 2019 Wales Book of the Year. In an interview with The Cardiff Review, Dunning revealed that the collection "is filled with poems centred on my own experiences, mental health, and narrative poems in the voices of various women whose stories I was completely compelled to tell. I like to get inside a person's head and let the writing stem from there."

In 2022, Dunning published her second poetry collection Pearl & Bone, again with Parthian Books. The collection deals with pregnancy and early motherhood, as well as telling the stories of different women across history (including poems in honour of Christine Keeler, whose image features on the book's cover). Pearl & Bone was named as the best collection by a Welsh poet in Wales Arts Review's 'The Best of 2022' list.

== Publications ==
=== Fiction ===
- Percy the Pom Pom Bear (2016)

=== Poetry ===
- The Wrong Side of the Looking Glass (with Natalie Ann Holborow) (2020)
- Salacia (2018)
- Pearl & Bone (2022)
