= Grits (novel) =

Book by Niall Griffiths

- First edition
- Author: Niall Griffiths
- Cover artist: Matt Smith/PYMCA
- Language: English
- Publisher: Jonathan Cape
- Publication date: Feb 2000
- Publication place: United Kingdom
- Media type: Print (paperback)
- Pages: 481
- ISBN: 0-224-05996-3
- Followed by: Sheepshagger

Grits is the debut novel by British author Niall Griffiths, published in 2000 by Jonathan Cape. Set in and around Aberystwyth and concerning promiscuity, drugs, alcohol, and petty crime it gained for its author, who lives and works in the town the dubious honorific "the Welsh Irvine Welsh". The novel is largely autobiographical, Griffiths moved to Aberystwyth to research a PhD in post-war British poetry but soon became, as he puts it, an "enthusiastic participator in parties" and dropped out of his studies.

Ianto, a character briefly appearing in Grits became the anti-hero of Griffith's second novel, Sheepshagger.

== Reception ==
From the rear of the 2001 Vintage Books edition :

- "When it comes to kick starting the literary millennium, Grits - difficult, disturbing and unforgettable - may well be the book to back" - Independent
- "Griffiths is undoubtedly a writer of talent. In the breadth of his huge, pulsing first novel, he captures the tedium of a life lived from one fix to the next" - Observer
- "If you liked Irvine Welsh's Trainspotting you'll love Grits" - Daily Express
