= The Colour of a Dog Running Away =

2005 novel by Richard Gwyn

First edition (publ. Parthian Books)

The Colour of a Dog Running Away is a novel by the Welsh novelist Richard Gwyn published in 2005.

== Plot summary ==
The main character in the story is named Lucas. Lucas is a translator and former musician living in Barcelona, Spain. The story begins with Lucas finding a cryptic invitation to a local art gallery under his door. In turn, Lucas goes to this event and sets in motion a series of unique events that not only disturb his daily routine, but change his perspective forever. Lucas meets his first love, Nuria. Lucas and Nuria begin an intense love affair. Lucas meets other characters that occupy his building. He meets mythic gypsies who steal rabbits which have been raised on the roof of his building. However, shortly after Lucas and Nuria begin their relationship, they are kidnapped by a religious cult.
