= Wales Arts Review =

Critical writing hub for Wales

- Editor: Gary Raymond
- Categories: Literature, art, ideas, music, theatre, film
- Frequency: Daily
- First issue: 2012
- Country: Wales
- Language: English
- Website: walesartsreview.org

Wales Arts Review is a critical writing hub for Wales. Originally published fortnightly, the site has published daily since 2016. It offers a critique, by Welsh and Wales-based writers, of various social and cultural aspects of Wales.

== History ==
The Wales Arts Review was founded in 2012 by Editors Gary Raymond, Phil Morris, Dean Lewis and Dylan Moore as a successor to the literary magazine The Raconteur. Founded on the principal of providing a community of writers and artists a high quality critical coverage of the arts in Wales, its core function is to build a platform for a new generation of Welsh critics to engage with the wider world through writing about and vigorously debating books, theatre, film, music, the visual arts and the media.

In partnership with Wales Arts International, the Welsh Books Council and the Arts Council of Wales, Wales Arts Review has quickly established itself in a central role in the new Welsh culture of arts criticism.

== Features ==
Wales Arts Review has, along with comprehensive arts reviews and interviews published many feature articles and essay debates. These have included exclusive access to the National Theatre Wales’ first production in Japan, Alan Harris' The Opportunity of Efficiency, and Dirty Protest Theatre's production at The Royal Court Theatre, the first appearance by a Welsh theatre company in over a decade. Further ongoing feature articles include a series of essays entitled the 'eternal conversation' in which critics discuss the nature and need of criticism in Welsh arts culture. Plus Wales Arts Review continues to publish a series of internationally based Welsh authors, who investigate the impact of Welsh culture outside Wales. This reportage series also has included first hand accounts of the Gezi protests.

Furthermore, Wales Arts Review has established various creative writing collaborations including with the Rhys Davies Trust to promote short story telling in Wales.

== Contributors ==
Notable contributors have included:

- Horatio Clare
- Gillian Clarke
- Jonathan Edwards
- Catherine Fisher
- Richard Gwyn
- Tristan Hughes
- Shani Rhys James
- Gwyneth Lewis
- Hayley Long
- Adrian Masters
- Patrick McGuinness
- Nuala Ni Chonchuir
- Helen Calcutt
- Owen Thomas
- Rachel Trezise
- Sarah Waters
- Charlotte Williams

== Staff ==
Editors

- April 2013–present: Gary Raymond
- January 2012 – April 2013: Gary Raymond & Dylan Moore

Managing Editors

- 2016–present: Ben Glover
- November 2012 – 2016: Phil Morris

Senior Editors

- 2019–present: Caragh Medlicott
- 2019–present: Dr Emma Schofield
- 2016–present: Craig Austin
- 2016–present: Cerith Mathias

Assistant Editors

- 2020–present: Bethan Hall
- 2018-2019: Jafar Iqbal
- 2017-2018: Durre Shahwar

Design Editor

- January 2012 – 2015: Dean Lewis

Editor-at-Large

- April 2013 – 2014: Dylan Moore

Deputy Editors

- April 2013 – 2016: Steph Power, John Lavin, Ben Glover
