= Stillicide =

Fiction podcast and novel by Cynan Jones

Stillicide is a collection of short stories originally commissioned by the BBC as a radio drama. The stories were later published in the literary magazine Granta and also published as a novel by Catapult in 2020.

== Background ==
The word "Stillicide" means water falling in drops that cause erosion over time, which reflects the story's themes of environmental crisis and water scarcity. The stories take place in the future and revolve around different attempts at mitigating a devastating drought in the UK. The series was originally commissioned for BBC radio, the literary magazine Granta also published the collection of stories, and the book was published by Catapult. The novel was published on November 17, 2020. The book alludes to instances in the 1960s when Welsh towns were flooded to provide drinking water for English towns such as the Tryweryn flooding. The 12-episode podcast was written by Cynan Jones and produced by the BBC. The podcast featured Anne-Marie Duff, Richard Goulding, and Alex Jennings.

== Plot ==
Water is scarce and pipelines to the city have been bombed by terrorists, which means that water has to be delivered to the city on a train. The first short story follows an armed policeman named John Branner who is tasked with guarding the train carrying the water to the city, and his orders are to shoot anything that gets close to the train. One of the short stories is a love letter from John Branner's wife who is terminally ill. Another story is about a journalist who is critical of a plan to drag an iceberg from the Arctic to the city in an attempt to alleviate the drought.

== Reception ==
In The Boston Globe, Max Winter praised the stories calling them "tense, stark, and beautifully paced". Julia Kastner wrote in Shelf Awareness that the stories are "a quiet masterpiece of language". Malcolm Forbes wrote in the Minnesota Star Tribune that the stories presented "a terrifying vision but a captivating read." Donna Bettencourt wrote in the LibraryJournal that the book is "an absorbing narrative for sophisticated readers." The book received a starred review from Publishers Weekly that called it a "brilliantly crafted" and "visionary tale".

== See also ==
- List of environmental podcasts
