= Jerwood Fiction Uncovered Prize =

The Jerwood Fiction Uncovered Prize was a promotional initiative and literary award for British writers of outstanding works of fiction.

== History ==
Fiction Uncovered was established as a promotional tool in 2010 by The Literary Platform, supported by Arts Council England with funding from The National Lottery. From 2011, it selected eight books to highlight each year through its own website, author events, and partnerships with retailers. It became the Jerwood Fiction Uncovered Prize with sponsorship from the Jerwood Foundation from 2014, awarding £5,000 to each of the eight authors. Fiction Uncovered was cancelled in 2016 when the Jerwood sponsorship ended.

== Past winners ==
Prize winners
Year	Author	Title	Ref.
2011	Lindsay Clarke	The Water Theatre	
2011	Robert Edric	The London Satyr	
2011	Catherine Hall	The Proof of Love	
2011	Sarah Moss	Night Waking	
2011	Chris Paling	Nimrod's Shadow	
2011	Tim Pears	Disputed Land	
2011	Ray Robinson	Forgetting Zoë	
2011	Jake Wallis Simons	The English German Girl	
2012	Peter Benson	Two Cows and a Vanful of Smoke	
2012	Cressida Connelly	My Former Heart	
2012	Jill Dawson	Lucky Bunny	
2012	Tibor Fischer	Crushed Mexican Spiders	
2012	Doug Johnstone	Hit and Run	
2012	Susanna Jones	When Nights Were Cold	
2012	David Park	The Light of Amsterdam	
2012	Dan Rhodes	This Is Life	
2013	Lucy Caldwell	All the Beggars Riding	
2013	Anthony Cartwright	How I Killed Margaret Thatcher	
2013	Niven Govinden	Black Bread White Beer	
2013	Nikita Lalwani	The Village	
2013	Nell Leyshon	The Colour of Milk	
2013	James Meek	The Heart Broke In	
2013	Amy Sackville	Orkney	
2013	Rupert Thomson	Secrecy	
2014	Ben Brooks	Lolito	
2014	Bernardine Evaristo	Mr Loverman	
2014	Lesley Glaister	Little Egypt	
2014	Cynan Jones	The Dig	
2014	Gareth Roberts	Whatever Happened to Billy Parks?	
2014	Naomi Wood	Mrs. Hemingway	
2014	Gerard Woodward	Vanishing	
2014	Evie Wyld	All The Birds, Singing	
2015	Susan Barker	The Incarnations	
2015	Carys Davies	The Redemption of Galen Pike	
2015	Jo Mazelis	Significance	
2015	Grace McCleen	The Offering	
2015	Bethan Roberts	Mother Island	
2015	Lavie Tidhar	A Man Lies Dreaming	
2015	Emma Jane Unsworth	Animals	
2015	David Whitehouse	Mobile Library	
