= Susan Barker =

British novelist (born 1978)

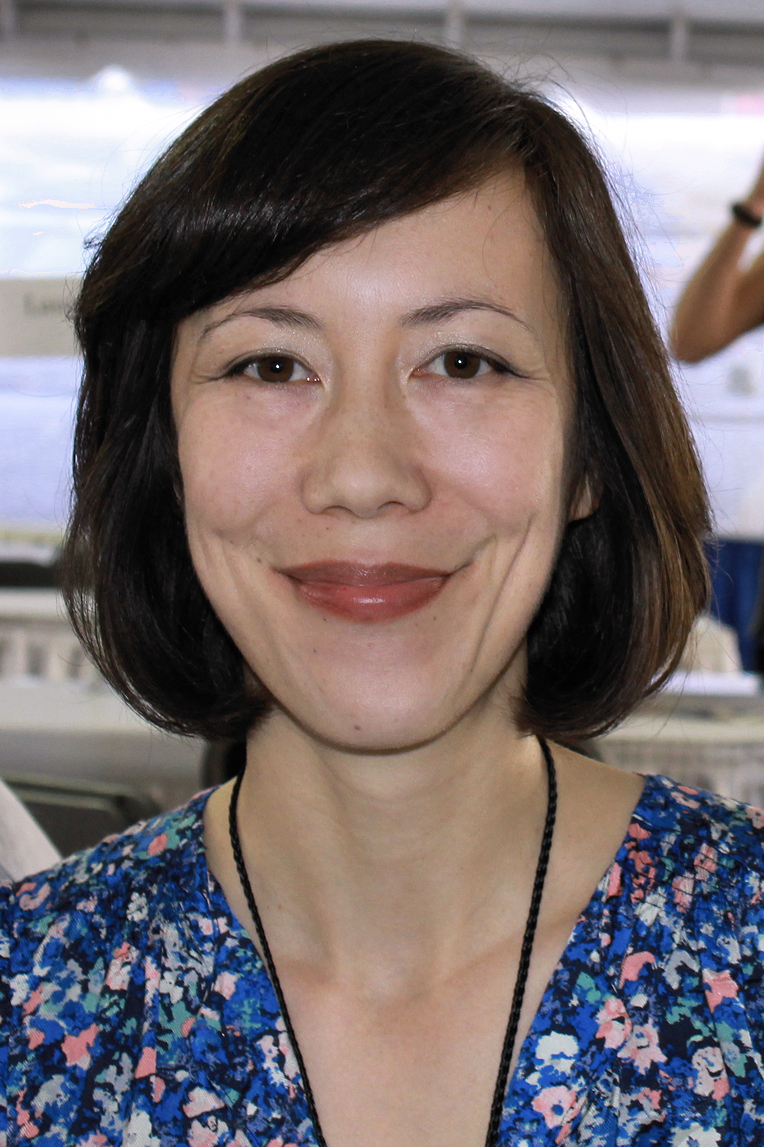
- Barker at the 2015 Texas Book Festival
- Born: 1978 (age 47–48)
- Education: Leeds University; Manchester University
- Occupation: Novelist
- Writing career
- Period: 2005–present
- Website: susanbarker.co.uk

Susan Barker (born 1978) is a British-Malaysian novelist. She has written four novels, all dealing with Asian themes. Her book The Incarnations won the 2015 Jerwood Fiction Uncovered prize, and an excerpt from her novel Old Soul won a 2020 Northern Writers Award for Fiction.

== Personal life ==
Barker has an English father and a Chinese-Malaysian mother and grew up in East London. She studied at Leeds University and undertook the graduate writing programme at Manchester University. She writes primarily about Asia.

== Career ==
Barker is a Senior Lecturer in Creative Writing at Manchester Metropolitan University and the author of four novels.

Her novel Sayonara Bar was described by Time magazine called "a cocktail of astringent cultural observations, genres stirred and shaken, subplots served with a twist".

Her second novel, The Orientalist and the Ghost was longlisted for the Dylan Thomas Prize. Her third novel, The Incarnations was described as a "stunning tale of a modern Beijing taxi driver being pursued by his soulmate across a thousand years of Chinese history". It won the Jerwood Fiction Uncovered prize in 2015.

Her fourth novel Old Soul was published in 2025. An excerpt won a Northern Writers Award for Fiction in 2020.

== Major works ==
- Sayonara Bar. London: Doubleday, 2005
- The Orientalist and the Ghost. London: Doubleday, 2008
- The Incarnations. London: Doubleday, 2014
- Old Soul. London: Penguin Fig Tree, 2025.
