= The Incarnations =

2014 novel by Susan Barker

- Author: Susan Barker
- Audio read by: Timo Chen; Joy Osmanski
- Language: English
- Genre: Literary fiction
- Set in: Beijing, China
- Publisher: Doubleday
- Publication date: 3 July 2014
- Publication place: United Kingdom
- Media type: Print, ebook, audiobook
- Pages: 384 pp
- ISBN: 9780857522573 (hardcover 1st ed.)
- OCLC: 885020345
- Preceded by: The Orientalist and the Ghost

The Incarnations is a 2014 British novel by Susan Barker. The novel was originally published by Doubleday in 2014 before being released in North America in 2015. Set in Beijing, the novel focuses on a taxi driver, Wang Jun, who begins receiving ominous letters from someone claiming to be his re-incarnated soulmate, and who has known him over six previous incarnations.

According to Barker, she spent six years completing the novel, which was written as she lived in Beijing, Seoul, Colorado, Boston, Leeds, Washington DC, London, and Shenzhen.

== Plot ==
Wang Jun is a taxi driver in his early thirties working in Beijing. He finds a letter in his cab informing him that his soulmate has found him again. Wang finds the letter frightening, especially as it mentions details of his personal life, the location of his apartment, and that the writer has ridden in his cab, but when he takes the letter to the police, they tell him they can do nothing.

Jun continues to find letters in his cab, with the mysterious writer telling him that they have met before in previous incarnations. The letter writer informs Jun that they are dedicated to being his biographer, and begins to include detailed stories about Jun's previous lives. Each letter takes places in a different historical time period, frequently involving violence, same-sex relationships, and betrayal.

The letters cause Jun to reflect on his past. His mother, Li Shuxiang, became deeply mentally ill and eventually died of drowning by swimming in a polluted river. Jun was hospitalized during university when he had a nervous breakdown and started showing symptoms similar to his mother. While there he met Zeng Yan, the first openly gay man Jun had ever met. The two later became lovers. When Jun runs into Zeng again after ten years, he immediately begins to suspect that Zeng is the one sending him letters, though Zeng denies it. Despite his own suspicions, Jun lapses into an affair with Zeng once more.

Images of Zeng and Jun together are sent to Jun's wife, Yida, and causes the two to separate for a time. The separation causes Jun's step-mother, Ling Hong, to tell Jun that his wealthy family will hire lawyers to ensure he will get sole custody of his daughter Echo. Realizing that Ling Hong wants to send his invalid father away and then play at being a family with Jun, whom she has tried to seduce before, Jun fights with his step-mother. During their fight, Ling Hong reveals that Li Shuxiang actually lived years beyond what Jun was told, though she eventually died after returning to her hometown. Betrayed and angry, Jun cuts both his father and step-mother out of his life for good.

Echo and Yida are nearly killed after an electrical fire starts in their apartment. Jun suspects that Zeng caused the fire.

The final letter is set in 1966 and tells the story of Yi Moon, the teenage daughter of a political dissident who has an affair with Zhang Liya, a well-connected and privileged member of the communists. When the revolutionaries turn on Liya, Moon helps betray her. Later, to atone for what she has done, she helps Liya commit suicide and then attempts suicide herself. However, she survives and reveals that in her attempts to survive she swapped identities with a woman named Li Shuxiang, revealing that she is Jun's mother.

Before he can read the final letter, Jun dies in a car accident with Zeng, which some suspect to be suicide. At the wake, Li Shuxiang appears, though the only one who recognizes her is Jun's invalid father, who is unable to communicate with others who she is. Li Shuxiang gives the final letter to Echo, but also tells Echo that she is also an incarnation, revealing that she believes Echo is a cruel villain who has plagued Jun and Li Shuxiang in all of their previous lives.

== Characters ==
- Wang Jun – a thirty year old taxi driver who is married with a child
- Wang Hu – Jun's father with whom he had a difficult and contentious relationship before his stroke left him partially paralyzed
- Ling Hong – Jun's step-mother who is only nine years older than him and with whom Jun had an emotional affair when he was 18
- Yida – Jun's provincial wife who works at a massage parlour
- Echo – Jun and Yida's daughter who is eight years old and loves comics

== Reception ==
The novel received positive reviews. The New York Times called it "a work of considerable, if unnerving, importance." It was a finalist for the 2015 Kirkus Prize and Kirkus Reviews called it "a deeply human masterpiece." The Guardian praised it as a "wonderful book".

== Awards ==
Year	Award	Category	Result	Ref
2015	Jerwood Fiction Uncovered Prize	—	Won	
2015	Kirkus Prize	Fiction	Shortlisted	
2016	International Dublin Literary Award	—	Longlisted	
