= Peter Lord (art historian) =

British art historian (born 1948)

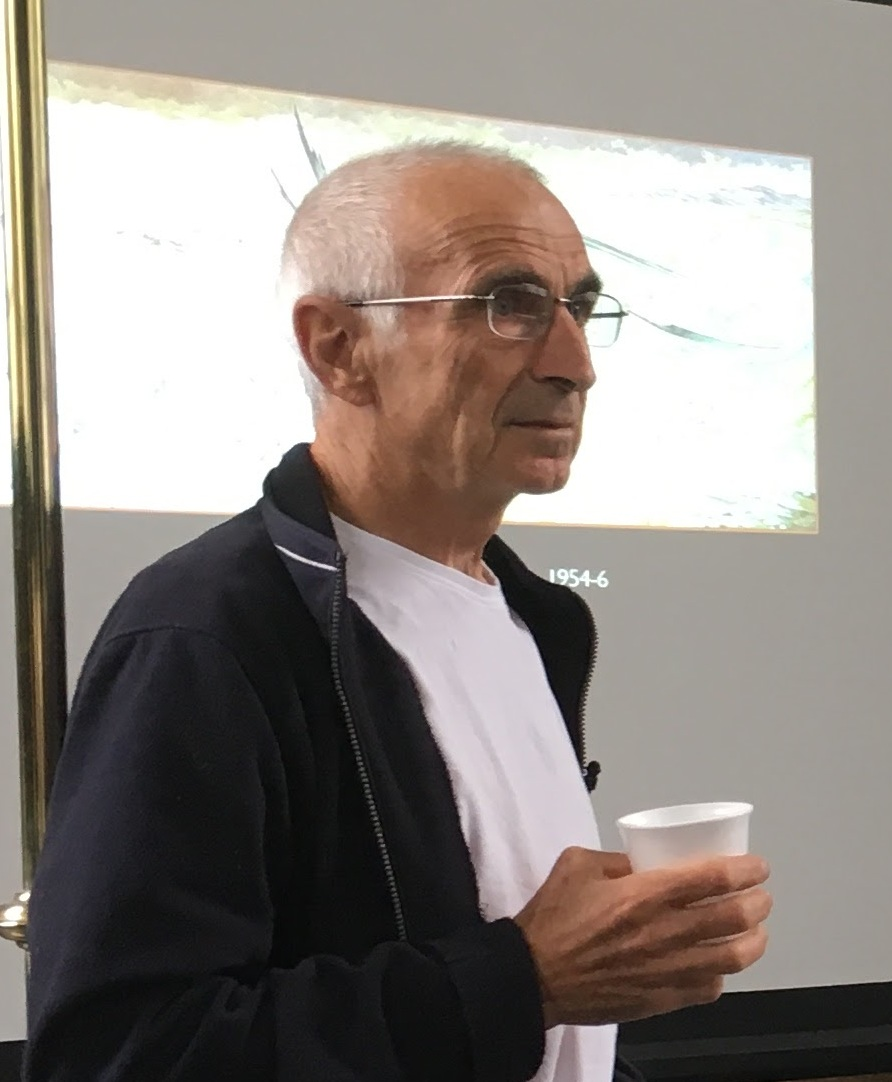

Peter Lord (born 1948) is an English sculptor and art historian based in Wales. He is best known for his books and television programmes about the history of Welsh art, and is regarded as a leading authority on the subject. Critic Andrew Green has said that The Visual Culture of Wales, Lord's three-volume series published by University of Wales Press, "restored to Wales a narrative of visual art that had been lost or denied for decades".

== Biography ==
Lord was born in Exeter and his early art education came from sculptor Peter Thursby. He studied Fine Arts at the University of Reading, graduating in 1970 and moving to Wales in 1975. He worked as a sculptor and painter until 1986, when he began writing. One of his most notable works as a sculptor is the Hywel Dda Centre at Whitland. He also designed the chapel of St Padarn at St Padarn's Church, Llanbadarn Fawr, between 1985 and 1988.

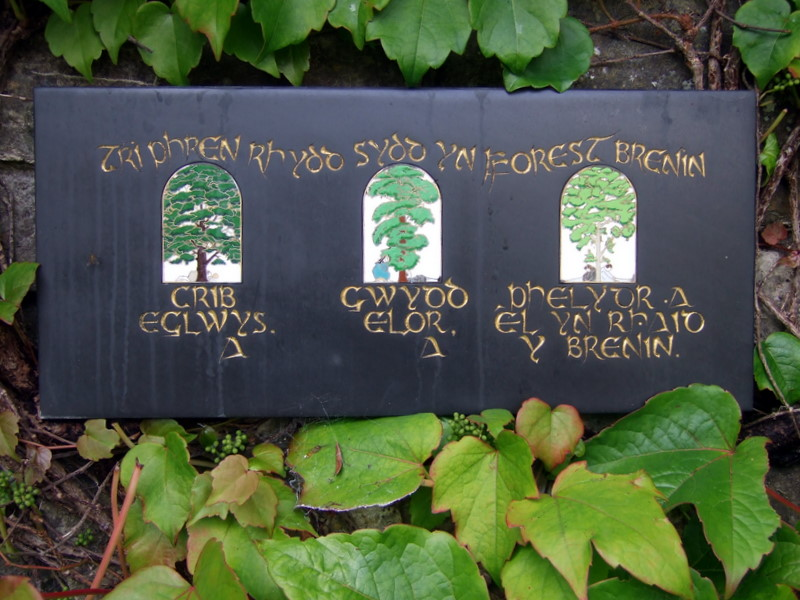
Enamels by Lord the Hywel Dda Centre, Whitland

During his residence in Wales, Lord has learned to speak the Welsh language and now writes and broadcasts in both English and Welsh. In 1999 he wrote and presented a seven-part series for BBC Wales, entitled The Big Picture. His 2016 publication, The Tradition, has been described as "the first account of the history of Welsh art for over half a century.

Lord, an independent scholar, curator and collector, has held Research Fellowships at Swansea University and at the University of Wales Centre for Advanced Welsh and Celtic Studies in Aberystwyth. He was also Visiting Fellow at the Yale Center for British Art in New Haven, Connecticut, USA (1994), where he occasionally lectures.

== Works ==
=== Books ===
- Gwenllian: Essays on Visual Culture (Gomer Press, 1994) ISBN 9781859020197
- Industrial Society (Visual Culture of Wales) (University of Wales Press, 2000) ISBN 9780708316528
  - Y Gymru Ddiwydiannol (Diwylliant Gweledol Cymru) (University of Wales Press, 2000) ISBN 9780708316535 (Welsh language edition of Industrial Society)
- Imaging the Nation (Visual Culture of Wales) (University of Wales Press, 2000) ISBN 9780708315873
  - Imaging the Nation (CD-ROM edition, University of Wales Press, 2002) ISBN 9780708317709
  - Delweddu'r Genedl (Diwylliant Gweledol Cymru) (University of Wales Press, 2004) ISBN 9780708315927 (Welsh language edition of Imaging the Nation
- Medieval Vision (Visual Culture of Wales) (University of Wales Press, 2003) ISBN 9780708318010
- Winifred Coombe Tennant: A Life Through Art (National Library of Wales 2007) ISBN 9781862250659
- The Meaning of Pictures: Personal, Social and National Identity (University of Wales Press, 2009) ISBN 9780708322215
- Between Two Worlds: The Diary of Winifred Coombe Tennant 1909-1924, edited by Peter Lord (University of Wales Press, 2011) ISBN 9781862250864
- Relationships with Pictures: an Oblique Autobiography (Parthian Books, 2013) ISBN 9781908946690
- The Tradition: A New History of Welsh Art (Parthian Books, 2016) ISBN 9781910409626
- William Roos : A'r Bywyd Crwydrol / And the Itinerant Life. Llangefni: Oriel Ynys Môn. 2020. ISBN 978-1-902565-20-0.
- Looking Out: Welsh Painting, Social Class and International Context (Parthian Books, 2020) ISBN 9781912681976
- The Art of Music: Branding the Welsh Nation, co-author Rhian Davies (Parthian Books 2022) ISBN 9781914595257

=== Television ===
- The Big Picture (BBC, 1999)
