= True Things =

2021 film by Harry Wootliff

- Theatrical release poster
- Directed by: Harry Wootliff
- Screenplay by: Harry Wootliff; Molly Davies
- Based on: True Things About Me by Deborah Kay Davies
- Produced by: Tristan Goligher; Ruth Wilson; Ben Jackson; Jude Law
- Starring: Ruth Wilson; Tom Burke
- Cinematography: Ashley Connor
- Edited by: Tim Fulford
- Music by: Alex Baranowski
- Production companies: BBC Film; BFI; Lady Lazarus; Riff Raff UK; The Bureau
- Distributed by: Picturehouse Entertainment
- Release dates: 4 September 2021 (Venice); 1 April 2022 (United Kingdom)
- Running time: 102 minutes
- Country: United Kingdom
- Language: English
- Box office: $140,688

True Things is a 2021 British psychological drama film written and directed by Harry Wootliff, starring Ruth Wilson and Tom Burke. The film is an adaptation of the 2010 novel True Things About Me by Deborah Kay Davies.

The film had its world premiere at the 78th Venice International Film Festival on 4 September 2021, and was released theatrically in the United Kingdom on 1 April 2022 by Picturehouse Entertainment. It received positive reviews from critics.

== Synopsis ==
Kate works in a benefits office in the English coastal town of Ramsgate. She is sleepwalking through life when a chance sexual encounter with a charismatic stranger awakens her. High on infatuation, she finds herself inexplicably drawn to this mysterious man. Hoping he will provide the escape she so desperately desires, she embarks on an emotionally dangerous journey that slowly begins to consume her.

== Cast ==
- Ruth Wilson as Kate
- Tom Burke as Blond
- Hayley Squires as Alison
- Elizabeth Rider as Mum
- Frank McCusker as Dad
- Ann Firbank as Nan
- Tom Weston-Jones as Rob

== Production ==
Ruth Wilson and Jude Law produced the film, alongside The Bureau, BBC Films and the BFI.

Filming began in early 2020 but was halted due to the COVID-19 pandemic. Production resumed in September 2020 in Ramsgate, England, and Málaga, Spain, and wrapped the following month. Other filming locations include the Kent towns of Margate and Broadstairs.

== Release ==
True Things had its world premiere at the 78th Venice International Film Festival, and also screened at the 2021 Toronto International Film Festival and the 2021 BFI London Film Festival, where it won the IWC Shaffhausen award. In March 2021, Picturehouse Entertainment acquired UK and Ireland distribution rights to the film, while North American distribution rights were acquired by Samuel Goldwyn Films that October. The film was released theatrically in the United Kingdom on 1 April 2022, and was released in theatres and on digital in the United States on 9 September 2022.

Wootliff has discussed what appealed about the original book, as well as the universality of the material for both men and women: "What I loved about it was the feeling of infatuation, of addiction to somebody [...] You know those relationships where you think 'why did I ever go there?' It's one of those."

A sentiment articulated by critic Mark Kermode of The Observer: "Anyone who has ever defined themselves through the eyes of others, or sought self-worth in unworthy romance, will recognise both the agony and ecstasy of Kate's predicament."

== Critical reception ==
True Things received positive reviews from critics. On Rotten Tomatoes, the film holds an approval rating of 81% based on 68 reviews, with an average rating of 6.7/10. The website's critics consensus reads, "Elevated by its stars' magnetic chemistry, True Things mines complex, character-driven drama from an ill-advised romance." Metacritic, which uses a weighted average, assigned the film a score of 68 out of 100, based on 22 critics, indicating "generally favorable reviews".

Screen International's Fionnuala Halligan commented that Wootliff "expands her range to a dazzling degree with her immersive second feature True Things (following on from the admired, if less formally-daring, Only You). This intoxicating tale of a woman and the wrong man in a rundown seaside town is adventurously delivered". The film's lack of easy solutions, in relation to the protagonist being a complex and multi-layered female character, was noticed by Rebecca Harrison of Sight and Sound: "It feels frustrating because it's meant to: this is what it's like to care for this character... a film that refuses to simplify Kate's experience or force the character to give everything of herself away." Tim Robey of The Daily Telegraph commented on the way society pigeon holes women like Kate: "There's something affecting about her struggle to be a normal person, doing what normal people do, while independently rebelling against the drudgery required of her to fit in", describing the role as Wilson's "best film work to date." Kevin Mayer of The Times pointed to the inherent contradictions of complex and emotionally-led female characters, which is a cornerstone of Wootliff's film style: "Wootliff and Wilson create a central character who is irrational, sometimes infuriating, but always intensely sympathetic."

On its US release, Sheila O'Malley of RogerEbert.com noted the film's assuredly grown-up perspective, "for those of you who miss films made by adults and for adults, films which treat things like sex and loneliness with respect and honesty, True Things isn't to be missed." Nicolas Rapold of The New York Times singled out the camerawork "because it is the kind that is often described as 'intimate' but rarely pulled off with such Maysles-esque aplomb." Referring to the central character of Kate, Noel Murray of the Los Angeles Times highlighted the use of PJ Harvey's song "Rid of Me" as a "simultaneously sad and thrilling assertion of her own right to exist". Fran Hoepfner of The Wrap was drawn to the depth and complexity of the story, "A relationship like the one Kate pursues with Blond isn't fed by reason; it's fed by something larger and stranger and endlessly unknowable."
