= Rebecca F. John =

Welsh writer (born 1986)

- Born: 1986 (age 39–40)
- Occupation: Writer
- Writing career
- Genre: Fiction
- Notable works: Clown's Shoes (2015); Fannie (2022)
- Notable awards: PEN International New Voices Award, 2015
- Website: rebeccafjohn.com

Rebecca F. John is a Welsh novelist. She won the PEN International New Voices Award in 2015, and has been shortlisted for the Costa Book Awards and the Wales Book of the Year.

== Early life ==
Rebecca F. John was born in 1986, and grew up in Pwll, a small coastal village in Carmarthenshire, Wales.

== Career ==
John's first solo publication was Clown's Shoes, a collection of short fiction published by Parthian Books in 2015. A month before publication, one of the stories that would be included in the collection – 'Moon Dog' – won the PEN International New Voices Award at a ceremony in Quebec. John's début novel, The Haunting of Henry Twist, followed in 2017. Published by Serpent's Tail, it was shortlisted for the Costa Book Award for First Novel.

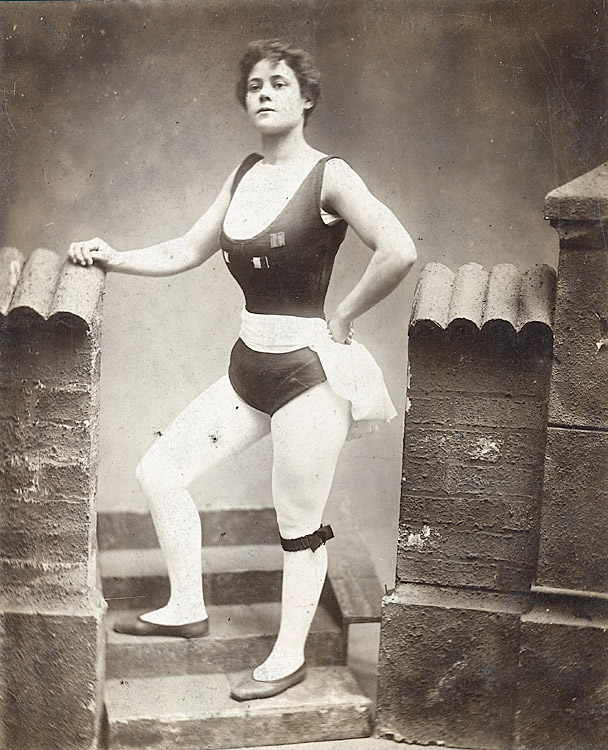
Vulcana, the eponymous inspiration for John's 2023 novel

After a five-year publishing hiatus, in 2022 John published three novels. The first was The Empty Greatcoat, a fictional reimagining of John's great-great uncle's experiences of the First World War. The second was a novella – Fannie – a feminist reimagining of the story of Fantine, the young grisette from Victor Hugo's 1862 novel Les Misérables. In May 2023, Fannie was shortlisted for the Wales Book of the Year award, with the shortlisting announced on BBC Radio Wales. John's third publication of 2022 was The Shadow Order, her first novel for young people. The publication of The Shadow Order by Firefly Press was closely followed by her taking up a role as Senior Editor at the publisher, having previously worked as an editor at Gomer and Honno.

In 2023, John published her fifth novel: Vulcana. Like The Empty Greatcoat of the previous year, Vulcana is a fictionalised account of real events, centred upon the story of Welsh strongwoman Kate Williams, who achieved fame using the stagename Vulcana in the late 19th century and early 20th century.

== Bibliography ==
=== Novels ===
- The Haunting of Henry Twist (2017)
- The Empty Greatcoat (2022)
- Fannie (2022)
- The Shadow Order (2022)
- Vulcana (2023)

=== Short fiction ===
- Clown's Shoes (2015)
