= Deborah Kay Davies =

Welsh writer

- Born: Pontypool, South Wales, United Kingdom
- Education: Cardiff University (PhD)
- Occupations: Poet, writer, educator
- Writing career
- Language: English
- Genres: Poetry, short story, novel

Deborah Kay Davies is a Welsh poet, writer, and educator. She received her PhD from Cardiff University. In 2009, she received a Wales Book of the Year for English-language for the short story collection Grace, Tamar and Laszlo the Beautiful (2008). Her novels include True Things About Me (2010) and Reasons She Goes to the Woods (2014).

Born in Pontypool, South Wales, in 2014 Davies was living in Cardiff. She was an educator of creative writing at both Cardiff University and the University of Glamorgan.

Her first book, a collection of poems titled Things You Think I Don’t Know, was published in 2006.

The film True Things (2021) is based on her 2010 novel, True Things About Me.

== Books ==
- Things You Think I Don't Know (poems), 2006, Cardigan: Parthian Books, ISBN 1-90576-221-6
- Grace, Tamar and Laszlo the Beautiful, 2008, Cardigan: Parthian Books, ISBN 978-1-90576-290-3
- True Things About Me, 2010 (Edinburgh: Canongate Books); London: Faber and Faber, 2011, ISBN 978-0-865478541
- Reasons She Goes to the Woods, 2014 (London: Oneworld Publications)
- Tirzah and the Prince of Crows, 2018 (London: Oneworld Publications)
