= Lewis Davies =

British librarian and philanthropist (1913–2011)

- Born: Arthur Lewis Davies; 26 January 1913; Blaenclydach
- Died: 9 December 2011 (aged 98)
- Occupations: Librarian and philanthropist

Arthur Lewis Davies (26 January 1913 – 9 December 2011), was a Welsh librarian and philanthropist who in his later years established a foundation (the Rhys Davies Trust) devoted to the promotion of Welsh writing in English. He was the younger brother of writer Rhys Davies.

== Early life ==
Lewis Davies was born in the coal mining village of Blaenclydach, near Tonypandy, to parents who operated a grocery store. They were careful to educate all their six children, to keep them from having to be employed in the coal mines. Like his more famous brother Rhys, he was gay and for that reason decided against a career in the Anglican priesthood.

== Career ==
He studied history at the University College of Wales, Aberystwyth, later training there also at their College of Librarianship to become a librarian. In 1937, Davies secured an assistant librarian position at the Daily Mirror, which he held for ten years. He then went to Odhams Press as their chief librarian in 1952 — a position he held until his retirement from the succeeding company IPC Books in 1978.

In 1990, he decided to use the proceeds of substantial bequests to help promote the literary reputation of his brother Rhys and other Anglo-Welsh writers.
