= Jemma L. King =

Anglo-Welsh poet

Jemma L. King is an Anglo-Welsh poet from Shrewsbury, Shropshire, England. She spent much of her childhood in Shrewsbury and Aberystwyth on the west coast of Wales. King won the Terry Hetherington Young Welsh Writer of the Year Award in 2011.

== Career ==
Her debut collection, The Shape of a Forest (Parthian, 2013), attracted national attention when it was shortlisted for the Dylan Thomas Prize in 2013. The book was reviewed in the Welsh literary press for its “haunting precision and historical sweep”.

King’s second collection, The Undressed (2014), explores a cache of Victorian-era nude photographs.

A third collection, Moon Base One, was scheduled for October 2025.

== Festivals and readings ==
King has appeared at international events including Newfoundland’s March Hare Festival and Festivaletteratura in Mantua, Italy.

== Awards ==
- Terry Hetherington Young Welsh Writer of the Year Award (winner, 2011)
- Dylan Thomas Prize (shortlist, 2013)
- Wales Book of the Year – Roland Mathias Poetry Award (shortlist, 2014)
- Cambrian Mountains Poetry Competition (winner, 2024)

== Selected bibliography ==
- The Shape of a Forest (2013)
- The Undressed (2014)
- Moon Base One (2025)
