= Owen Thomas (darts player) =

Personal information
- Full name: Owen B. Thomas
- Born: 24 April 1953 (age 73) Pontypool, Wales
- Home town: Pontypool, Wales

Sport
- Sport: Darts
- Playing since: 1971
- Darts: 14g Tungsten Cooper
- Laterality: Right-handed
- Walk-on music: "That's All" by Genesis

Organisation (see split in darts)
- BDO: 1983–1988

WDF major events – best performances
- World Championship: Last 32: 1984
- World Masters: Last 32: 1983

Owen B. Thomas is a former Welsh professional darts player who competed in the 1980s.

== Career ==
Thomas played in the 1984 BDO World Darts Championship, losing in the first round to Gerry Haywood.

He also played in the 1983 Winmau World Masters and the 1984 British Professional, losing in the first round in both tournaments to Keith Deller and Eric Burden.

== World Championship results ==
=== BDO ===
- 1984: Last 32: (lost to Gerry Haywood 0–2)
