= A Toy Epic =

1958 novel by Emyr Humphreys

- Cover of the first edition
- Publisher: Eyre & Spottiswoode

A Toy Epic is a novel by Welsh author Emyr Humphreys. It was first published in 1958. The novel follows the story of three boys as they grow up in 'one of the four corners of Wales', crossing paths until they eventually become good friends. Humphreys first started writing the book in 1945, thirteen years before it was published. The book has been described by critics as a "shining example of literary modernism".
