= Owen Thomas (automobile company) =

Defunct American motor vehicle manufacturer

The Owen Thomas Car Company was founded in 1908 in Janesville, Wisconsin, by W. Owen Thomas of Chicago in a machine shop that belonged to the Chicago & North Western Railroad. It survived till 1910.

== History ==
The company made cars that were called Owen Thomas "Sixes.". They had air-cooled, 60 hp six-cylinder engines. One advanced feature was that instead of a carb., the Owen Thomas had an early type of fuel injection system based on early aviation practices. The wheelbase was a long 136". The company went out of business in Sept. of 1910, the official reason was because the backers could not get a Selden license.
