= David Whitehouse (writer) =

British writer (born 1981)

David Whitehouse (born 1981) is a British writer. Whitehouse is known for his novels Bed (2011), Mobile Library (2015), and The Long Forgotten (2018). He also wrote the non-fiction book About a Son: A Murder and a Father's Search for Truth (2022).

Whitehouse has written scripts for Channel 4, ITV, Sky, and FX. A former journalist, his writing has been published by outlets such as The Guardian, The Sunday Times, The Independent, Esquire, Time Out, and Observer Magazine.

Whitehouse graduated with a bachelor's degree in Journalism from London College of Communication in 2002.

For the manuscript of his novel Bed, Whitehouse won the inaugural (2010) To Hell with Prizes Award for unpublished novels; for the same book, he won the Betty Trask Prize. For Mobile Library, he received the Jerwood Fiction Uncovered Prize, and for About a Son, he was shortlisted for the Gordon Burn Prize.

== Accolades ==
Awards for Whitehouses's writing
Year	Title	Award	Result	Ref.
2010	Bed	To Hell with Prizes Award	Winner	
2012	Bed	Betty Trask Award	Winner	
2012	Bed	Desmond Elliott Prize	Longlist	
2015	Mobile Library	Jerwood Fiction Uncovered Prize	Winner	
2022	About a Son	Gordon Burn Prize	Shortlist	

== Publications ==
- Bed. New York, NY: Scribner Press. 2011. ISBN 978-1-4516-1422-0.
- Mobile Library. New York, NY: Scribner Press. 2015. ISBN 9781476749433.
- The Long Forgotten. Picador. 2018. ISBN 9781509827510.
- About a Son: A Murder and A Father’s Search for Truth. Phoenix Press. 2022. ISBN 9781474620567.
- Saltwater Mansions: The Woman Who Disappeared and Other Untold Stories. Phoenix Press. 2025. ISBN 9781399622004.
