= Rhys Davies (writer) =

Welsh novelist

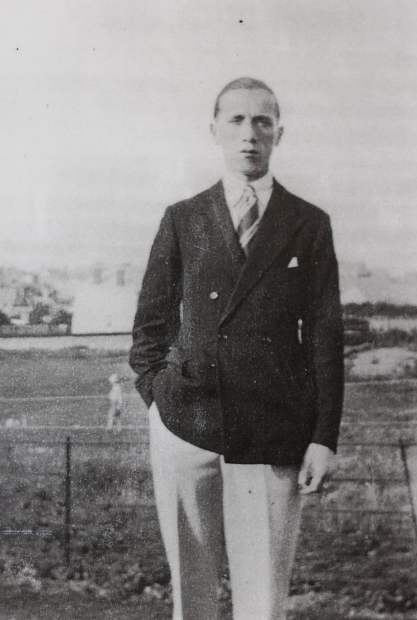
Rhys Davies in 1921

Vivian Rees Davies OBE (9 November 1901 – 21 August 1978), known as Rhys Davies, was a Welsh novelist and short story writer, who wrote in the English language.

== Life ==
One of the most prolific Welsh prose writers of the 20th century, Davies wrote approximately one hundred short stories, as well as twenty novels, three novellas, two books about Wales and an autobiography. Though he mostly lived in London, Davies' work is often set in Wales, typically either in a fictionalised Rhondda or further west in his rural stories.

Davies was born on 9 November 1901 in Blaenclydach, a side-valley of the Rhondda. His father was a grocer and his mother a schoolteacher. His parents spoke Welsh, but did not pass it on to Rhys or his siblings. Rhys Davies's younger brother, Lewis Davies, was a Welsh librarian and philanthropist. As a child he attended Gosen Chapel, and later switched to St Thomas's Church, but ultimately declared himself an atheist in later life. He attended Porth County School, but left at fourteen and worked for his parents' shop. He briefly worked in Cardiff at a corn-merchant's warehouse before moving to London, where he began his literary career with the publication of a number of short stories. The publisher Charles Lahr published some of Davies' early work in The New Coterie, a small avant-garde magazine. In 1927 Davies published his first short story collection The Song of Songs and first novel The Withered Root. The Withered Root had a favourable critical reception, receiving good reviews and published in an American edition. He received an advance for his second novel that helped him remain a full-time writer.

It was at this time (1928–29) that Davies was invited to stay with D. H. Lawrence and Frieda Lawrence in France. Their meeting has been dramatised in Sex and Power at the Beau Rivage (2003), a play by contemporary Welsh author Richard Lewis Davies. Rhys Davies smuggled a manuscript copy of Lawrence's Pansies into Britain and arranged for it to be published by Charles Lahr. Though Lawrence's death in March 1930 made their friendship a brief one, Lawrence appears to have been an important influence on Davies' work. Davies was homosexual, though he never wrote publicly about his own sexuality.

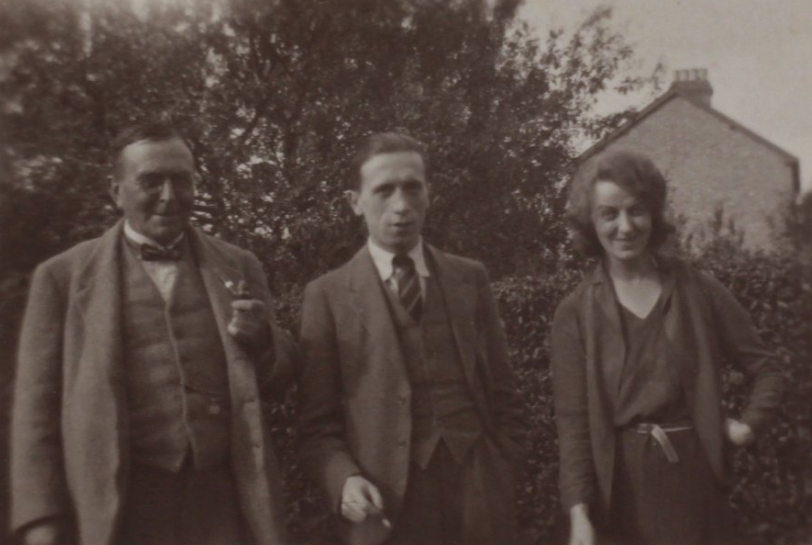
Rhys Davies (in the middle) with his friends at Much Hadham, July 1931

During the 1930s Davies led a peripatetic life, for although he was writing prolifically, he had limited financial success. He would often return to Blaenclydach when money ran low and to seek inspiration for writing. He stayed at the home of Vincent Wells until 1945 when the house caught fire and many of Davies's papers were destroyed. During the Second World War Davies wrote many short stories, for despite shortages in paper, magazines were exempt from rationing and there was considerable demand for reading material.

After the war he lived with the Scottish writer Fred Urquhart for a few years before moving to Brighton with friends. By 1955 he had moved back to London, to Bloomsbury, where he lived the rest of his life.

Davies was made financially secure by two legacies left to him, one from the estate of novelist Anna Kavan and the second from Louise Taylor, the adopted daughter of Alice B. Toklas. Davies based The Honeysuckle Girl on Anna Kavan's early life. D. J. Britton wrote a play, Silverglass, about the extraordinary relationship between Rhys Davies and Anna Kavan, presented as a premiere during the Rhys Davies Short Story Conference 2013 held in Swansea. The play is set in the late 1960s and reveals Davies' late literary recognition as well as Kavan's final tragedy. Both of them lived 'a life of self-invention, in which secrets, sexuality and deep questions of personal identity lurked constantly in the shadows'. He died of lung cancer, at age 76.

=== Awards ===
Davies was awarded an OBE in 1968, as well as the Welsh Arts Council Prize in 1971. His story "The Chosen One", originally published in The New Yorker, won an Edgar Allan Poe Award in 1967. In 1991, after his death, the Rhys Davies Trust was established by literary critic Meic Stephens to promote short fiction by Welsh authors in the English language. The trust sponsors the Rhys Davies Short Story Competition.

== Writing ==
=== Short stories ===
Many of Rhys Davies' short stories were released as collections, including:

- The Song of Songs (1927)
- A Pig in a Poke (1931)
- Daisy Matthews and Three Other Tales (1932)
- Love Provoked (London: Putnam, 1933)
- The Things Men Do (1936)
- A Finger in Every Pie (1942)
- The Trip to London (1946)
- Boy with a Trumpet (1949)
- Collected Stories (1955)
- The Darling of Her Heart (1958)

=== Novels ===
Davies also wrote twenty novels, including:

- The Withered Root (London: Robert Holden and Co Ltd, 1927)
- Count Your Blessings (London: Putnam, 1932)
- The Red Hills (London: Putnam, 1932)
- Honey and Bread (London: Putnam, 1935)
- A Time to Laugh (London: William Heinemann Ltd, 1937)
- Jubilee Blues (London: William Heinemann Ltd,1938)
- Under the Rose (London: William Heinemann Ltd, 1940)
- To-morrow to Fresh Woods (London: William Heinemann Ltd, 1941)
- The Black Venus (London: William Heinemann Ltd,1944)
- The Dark Daughters (London: William Heinemann Ltd, 1947)
- Marianne (London: William Heinemann Ltd, 1951)
- The Painted King (London: William Heinemann Ltd, 1954)
- The Perishable Quality (London: Heinemann, 1957)
- Nobody Answered the Bell (1971)
- The Honeysuckle Girl (1975)
- Ram with Red Horns (1996)

=== Other works ===
Davies wrote an autobiography, Print of a Hare's Foot (1969), and a successful play, No Escape (1954), as well as several works of non-fiction, including the travelogue My Wales (1937). There was also a stage musical, Jenny Jones, based on his stories that ran in the West End but was not a success.

== See also ==
- Lewis Davies (younger brother)
