= Richard Gwyn (Welsh writer) =

British writer

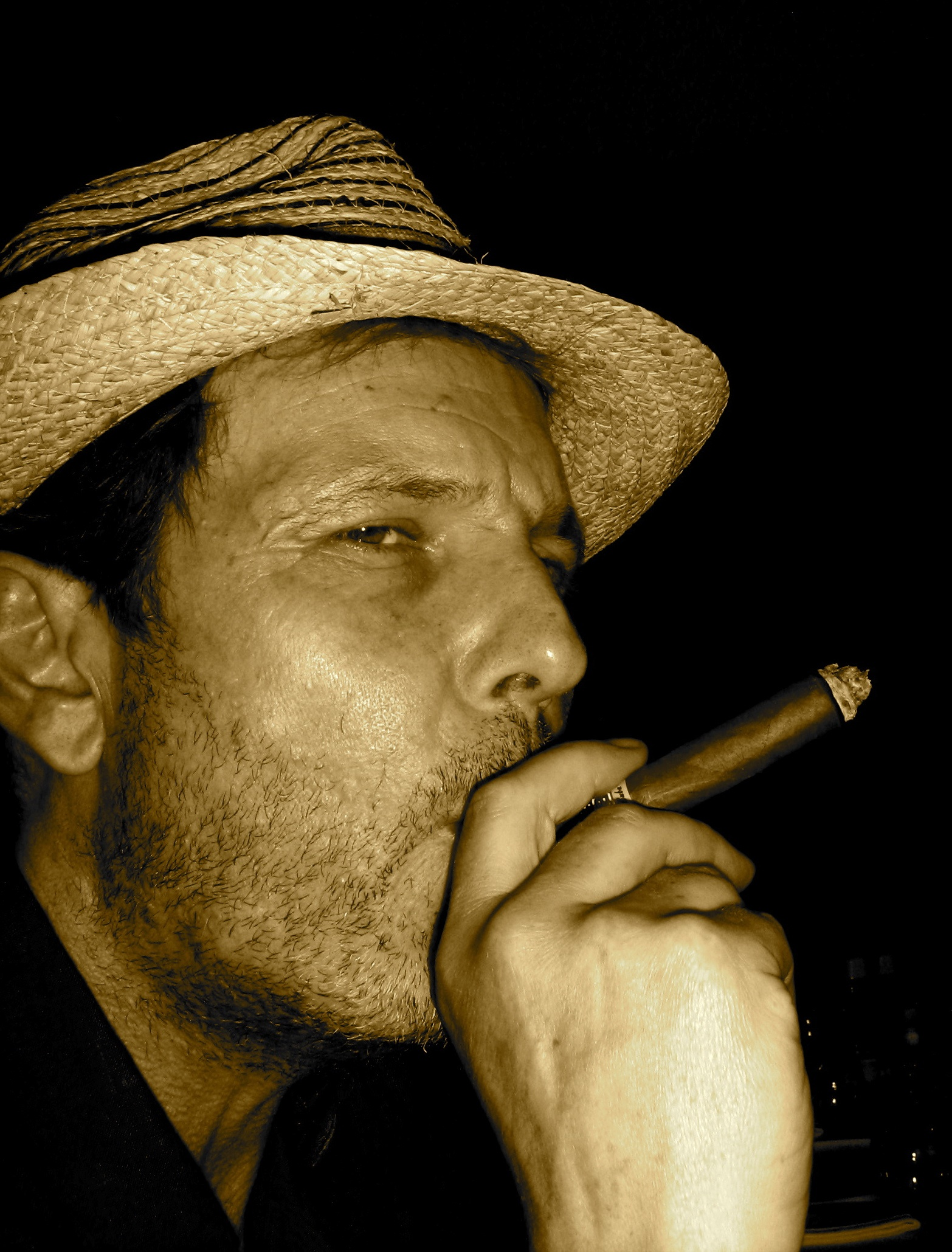
- Richard Gwyn in 2008
- Born: 22 July 1956 (age 69) Pontypool, Wales
- Occupation: Writer
- Genres: Novel, Poetry
- Literary movement: Fiction, Poetry

Website
- www.richardgwyn.com

Richard Gwyn is a Welsh novelist, essayist and poet.

== Life and career ==
Richard Gwyn was born in Pontypool, south Wales, and grew up in Crickhowell. After studying anthropology at the London School of Economics, but not completing his degree, Gwyn began to travel extensively across Europe, living for long spells in Greece and Spain, working on fishing boats and as an agricultural labourer. Following a period of vagrancy and serious illness, he returned to Wales, where his experiences of travel catalysed his interest in writing, and he published three collections of poetry and prose poems.

His first work of fiction, The Colour of a Dog Running Away, set in Barcelona, received widespread critical acclaim and has been translated into many languages. His second novel, Deep Hanging Out, set in Crete during the closing stages of the Cold War, was published in 2007 and is loosely based on the myth of the Minotaur. Interviews with the author present a figure concerned with ideas of borders and exile in a world besieged by spurious ideologies. In his third novel, The Blue Tent (2019) he returns to the Black Mountains of his childhood, in an oneiric mystery that one reviewer has called 'a portal to a magical Wales.'

His memoir The Vagabond's Breakfast, published in 2011, has been called an "astonishing memoir of alcoholism, illness and redemption describing, in language of the utmost control, what it feels like to lose control of one’s life." Patrick McGuinness, writing in The Times Literary Supplement called it "a jagged tale gracefully told. Full of humane surreality, there’s something whole, even holistic, about the brokenness of the life it pieces (back) together." Tessa Hadley, in the London Review of Books described it as "an enthralling memoir of a young man going deeply and terribly astray." Andrés Neuman, writing in Clarín (Argentina) called the book ‘Stunning… and as intimate and accurate as Virginia Woolf’s On Being Ill.

In recent years Gwyn has developed his career as a translator of poetry and short fiction by Latin American writers. In 2016 he published The Other Tiger: Recent Poetry from Latin America, which Edith Grossman described as: 'An incisive overview of recent, innovative writing we're not likely to find elsewhere in English. [T]he translations are beautiful and to the point. This is a book that belongs in every library, private or institutional, that has shelf-space for volumes of poetry.' Gwyn has also translated collections of poetry by the Argentinians Joaquín O. Giannuzzi and Jorge Fondebrider, and the Colombian poet Darío Jaramillo.

Since 2013 he has been Professor of Creative and Critical Writing at Cardiff University. Gwyn is the author of Ricardo Blanco's Blog in which he describes himself as a Citizen of Nowhere.

== Bibliography ==
=== Books by Richard Gwyn ===
- Walking on Bones (2000)
- Being in Water (2001)
- The Pterodactyl's Wing: Welsh World Poetry (2003)
- The Colour of a Dog Running Away (2005)
- Deep Hanging Out (2007)
- Sad Giraffe Cafe (2010)
- The Vagabond's Breakfast (2011)
- The Other Tiger: Recent Poetry from Latin America (2016)
- Stowaway: A Levantine Adventure (2018)
- The Blue Tent (2019)
