= Owen Thomas (playwright) =

Welsh playwright

Owen Thomas (born 1976) is a playwright, originally from Mid Wales who is now living and working in Cardiff.

His work has been performed in venues around the country. 'Richard Parker', toured the UK in Autumn 2009 and 2010. Starring Gareth John Bale and Alistair Sill, the play is a dark comedy exploring the notion of coincidence. The play was performed at the Edinburgh Festival in 2011 where it received favourable reviews. The play then ran at the 2012 Hollywood Fringe Festival in Los Angeles. The show went on to win 'Best International Show' and was listed amongst the top ten theatrical shows in Los Angeles for 2012.

Thomas followed up 'Richard Parker' with a sequel entitled 'Robert Golding' which explores the notion of conspiracy theories. The show was performed at Chapter Arts Centre, Cardiff in July 2013 before heading to the Edinburgh Fringe Festival.

'Grav', was a one-man show about the life of Welsh rugby player Ray Gravell. It was produced by the Torch Theatre, Milford Haven, directed by Peter Doran and starred Gareth John Bale in the title role. It won the Audience Award at the Welsh Theatre Awards in January 2016. It went on to run at the Edinburgh Fringe Festival and at the Actors Theatre Workshop in New York City.

'Benny', about the life of comedian Benny Hill, was first performed at Chapter Arts Centre, Cardiff in September 2017. The show will be performed at the Edinburgh Fringe Festival in Summer 2018. It starts Liam Tobin as Benny Hill and was directed by Gareth John Bale.

'The Wood' was his second collaboration with Peter Doran at the Torch Theatre, Milford Haven. Written to commemorate the centenary of World War One, the piece was inspired by the battle of Mametz Wood. It starred Ifan Huw Dafydd and Gwydion Rhys and went on national tour in Spring 2018.

== Work ==
- Les, Miserable, (First Draft Completed) 2018
- The Wood, Torch Theatre, Milford Haven 2018
- Benny, Chapter Arts Centre, Cardiff 2017
- Grav, Torch Theatre, Milford Haven 2015
- Robert Golding, Chapter Arts Centre, Cardiff 2012
- Black Ice, Chapter Arts Centre, Cardiff 2009
- Richard Parker (Various venues and festivals)2008
- 3, Chapter Arts Centre, Cardiff, 2005
- Meat, Hen and Chickens, London, 2004
- The Dead of Night, Hen and Chickens, London, 2003
- The Darkman Monologues, Sherman Theatre, Cardiff, 2002
- The Visitors, Circus Theatre, Stratford, East London, 2001
