= Niall Griffiths =

English author (born 1966)

Niall Griffiths FRSL
- Born: 12 September 1966 (age 60); Toxteth, Liverpool, England
- Education: Aberystwyth University
- Occupation: Writer
- Writing career
- Genres: Novel, travel
- Notable works: Sheepshagger; Stump
- Movements: Modernism, post-modernism, transgressive fiction

Niall Griffiths (born 1966) is an English author of novels and short stories, set predominantly in Wales. His works include the novels Grits and Sheepshagger, travel guides to Aberystwyth and Liverpool, and a book of poetry. He has won the Wales Book of the Year award twice, for Stump in 2004 and Broken Ghost in 2020.

== Life ==
Griffiths was born in Toxteth, Liverpool, but had a long family link to Welsh roots in West Wales. As a nine-year-old boy, Griffiths found a second-hand copy of a novel by Rhondda writer Ron Berry in a junk shop. Berry, who wrote from the viewpoint of the industrial working class, but in a more earthy and centred style than many of his more celebrated peers, "spoke" to Griffiths, who was captured by the language and style of the writing. In future years, Griffiths continued to cite Berry as a major influence, along with writers Alexander Trocchi and Hubert Selby Jr. In 1976, his family emigrated to Australia, but returned three years later after his mother became homesick.

Griffiths found himself in trouble with the law during his adolescence, and at the age of 15 he was sent on an Outward Bound course in Snowdonia in North Wales. He found the experience uplifting and refocused him to work harder at gaining an education, eventually gaining a degree in English. Griffith spent several years taking on a number of short term menial jobs before he was accepted into Aberystwyth University to study for a PhD in post-war poetry, but failed to complete the course. He followed this by researching his first novel, which would follow disaffected and marginalised characters, living ordinary lives.

Griffiths has been described as "a distinctively Welsh author". He has "a fierce loyalty" to the city of his birth, but has lived "most of his life near Aberystwyth". He currently lives "at the foot of a mountain in mid-Wales".

== Career ==
Griffith's debut novel, Grits, was published in 2000. A story of addicts and drifters set in Aberystwyth, it explores "life on the disadvantaged and desperate peripheries of society" and quickly drew comparisons with Irvine Welsh. Griffiths followed up Grits with Sheepshagger, a novel centred on a feral mountain boy named Ianto, which received strong reviews. In 2002, Griffiths published Kelly + Victor, which explores the passionate sexual relationship between two clubbers that spirals towards destruction. The book was made into a film in 2012, directed by his friend Kieran Evans.

Griffith's 2003 novel, Stump, is narrated by a one-armed Liverpudlian alcoholic trying to make a fresh start in Aberystwyth. Reviewers noted its "mesmerising command of idiom" and described it as "his most economic and effective piece of fiction". The Guardian said that it provides "one of the great depictions of alcoholism", and called Griffiths "an epic and, at moments, visionary writer". The novel won two national awards, the Welsh Books Council Book of the Year and the Arts Council of Wales Book of the Year Award.

After two more novels, Wreckage and Runt, he wrote two travel guides, Real Aberystwyth, about his new home, and Real Liverpool, both edited by Peter Finch. In 2009 he wrote Ten Pound Pom, travelling back to Australia for the first time as an adult, comparing his memories spent in the country as a child with his new found experiences.

He followed this with a book of prose, The Dreams of Max and Ronnie. Commissioned by Seren Books, this forms part of the New stories from the Mabinogion series, in which contemporary Welsh authors reimagine stories from the Mabinogion. The Dreams of Max and Ronnie is a version of The Dream of Rhonabwy. The series includes books by Owen Sheers, Gwyneth Lewis and Russell Celyn Jones.

2013 saw Griffiths release his seventh novel, A Great Big Shining Star, his aggressive take on celebrity culture and fame. Two years later Griffiths released his first collection of poetry, Red Roar: 20 Years of Words.

In 2019, Griffiths published Broken Ghost, a novel exploring the aftermath of a vision experienced by three people on a Welsh mountain. The Guardian called it "an important novel" and described it as "a profane, passionate response to nature and to the countryside, which is rarely encountered in contemporary British fiction any more". In 2020, this novel won the Rhys Davies Trust Fiction Award and gave Griffiths his second Wales Book of the Year award.

He was elected a Fellow of the Royal Society of Literature in 2022.

== Bibliography ==
=== Novels ===
- Grits (2000 ISBN 0-224-05996-3)
- Sheepshagger (2001 ISBN 0-09-928518-5)
- Kelly + Victor (2002 ISBN 0-09-942205-0)
- Stump (2003 ISBN 0-09-928758-7)
- Wreckage (2005 ISBN 0-09-946113-7)
- Runt (2007 ISBN 978-0-224-07123-9)
- The Dreams of Max and Ronnie (New Stories from the Mabinogion series) (2010)
- A Great Big Shining Star (2013)
- Broken Ghost (2019)
- Of Talons and Teeth (2023)

=== Poetry ===
- Red Roar:20 Years of Words (2015 ISBN 978-1-90311-020-1)

=== Non-Fiction ===
- Ten Pound Pom (2009)

=== Guide books ===
- Real Aberystwyth (with Peter Finch) (2008 ISBN 978-1-85411-447-1)
- Real Liverpool (with Peter Finch)

== Prizes and awards ==
- 2004 – Wales Book of the Year, for Stump
- 2020 – Wales Book of the Year, for Broken Ghost

== Critical studies ==
- Aleksander Bednarski: Inherent Myth: Wales in Niall Griffiths's Fiction. Lublin: Wydnawnictwo KUL (2012).
- Mark Schmitt: British White Trash: Figurations of Tainted Whiteness in the Novels of Irvine Welsh, Niall Griffiths and John King. Bielefeld: Transcript (2018 ISBN 978-3-8376-4101-1)
