= Gwyn Thomas (novelist) =

Welsh writer, dramatist and columnist

- Born: 6 July 1913; Cymmer, Porth, Rhondda Valley, Wales
- Died: 13 April 1981 (aged 67); University Hospital of Wales, Cardiff, Wales
- Education: University of Oxford, University of Madrid
- Occupation: School teacher
- Spouse: Lyn (née Williams)
- Writing career
- Period: 1930s–1970s
- Genres: Short stories, Radio plays, Novels, Plays

Gwyn Thomas (6 July 1913 – 13 April 1981) was a Welsh writer, dramatist, Punch-columnist, radio broadcaster and raconteur, who has been called "the true voice of the English-speaking valleys".

== Early life ==
Gwyn Thomas was born in Cymmer, Porth, in the Rhondda Valley, the youngest of 12 children, to coalminer Walter Morgan Thomas and his wife. His mother died when he was aged six, and he was consequently brought up by his sister, often with handouts from the local soup kitchen.

After winning a scholarship, Thomas studied Spanish at the University of Oxford. Plagued by mysterious health problems, terribly poor and depressed, it was only after spending a summer and a term at the end of his second year at Complutense University of Madrid, thanks to a miners' scholarship, that he decided to complete his studies. Thomas was diagnosed at the age of 23 with a previously undetected thyroid malfunction that had been poisoning him for years, which was operated on to prevent his death.

== Career ==
On graduation, and wanting to be a writer, Thomas struggled to establish himself during the 1930s depression. He took on part-time lecturing jobs across England, while trying to get his novel Sorrow For Thy Sons published.

He married his childhood friend Eiluned (Lyn) Thomas in Pontypridd Register Office on 5 January 1938. Failing to pass the British Army medical at the outbreak of World War II thanks to 20 years of smoking, he returned to Wales in 1940 and taught at the WEA. He then became a schoolteacher, first teaching French in Cardigan, and then Spanish and French at Barry Grammar School for 20 years.

Approached in 1951 by a BBC Radio Wales producer to write for the radio, he returned to his childhood memories of 1920s South Wales to create the radio play Gazuka!, a celebration of a bizarre musical instrument.

A prolific novelist and short-story writer, he became a regular on chat shows such as The Brains Trust, and after 20 years of teaching in 1962 he became a full-time writer and broadcaster, retiring with his wife to Peterston-super-Ely.

However, due to a combination of diabetes, heavy drinking and smoking, his health began to fail in the late 1960s. In 1981 Thomas collapsed and was taken to the University Hospital of Wales in Cardiff, where he died on 13 April, shortly before his 68th birthday.

== Memorial ==
In 1993 Sir Anthony Hopkins portrayed Thomas in a BBC Wales television production, "Selected Exits", adapted by Alan Plater and based on his memoir A Few Selected Exits. Later that year Hopkins unveiled a bronze bust of Thomas in the foyer of the New Theatre, Cardiff, where he spoke about his personal experience of knowing the author, who had been a family friend. Thomas was further commemorated at an event in Memorial Hall, Barry on Saturday 21 November 2009, when Pride in Barry announced it was placing a Blue Plaque on the Old College Inn, Barry, where his old school classrooms used to be.

In 2013, at the centenary of his birth, he was compared with Kingsley Amis and Evelyn Waugh.

== Works ==
=== Novels ===
- The Dark Philosophers (1946) [new edition 2005]
  - also published as The Sky of our Lives (1972)
- The Alone to The Alone (1947) [new edition 2008]
- All Things Betray Thee (1949) [new editions 1986, 2011]
  - also published as Leaves in the Wind (1949)
- The World Cannot Hear You (1951)
- Now Lead Us Home (1951)
- A Frost on My Frolic (1953)
- The Stranger at My Side (1954)
- A Point of Order (1956)
- The Love Man (1958)
- Sorrow For Thy Sons (1986) [1937]
- The Thinker and the Thrush (1988) [1949]
- Gazooka (2023) [1957]

=== Short stories ===
- Where Did I Put My Pity? (1946)
- Gazooka and Other Stories (1957)
- Ring Delirium 123 (1960)
- A Welsh Eye (1964) (with drawings by John Dd. Evans; new edition 1984)
- The Lust Lobby (1971)
- Selected Short Stories (1984) [new editions 1988, 1995]
- Meadow Prospect Revisited (1992)

=== Plays ===
- The Keep (1962)
- Sap (1974)
- The Breakers (1976)
- Three Plays (1990) [The Keep, Loud Organs, Jackie The Jumper]

=== Misc ===
- A Hatful of Humours (1965) [essays]
- A Few Selected Exits (1968) [autobiography; new editions 1985, 1993]
- High on Hope (1985) [journalism]

== See also ==
- Oxford Book of Welsh Verse in English
- Welsh Literature
