= Emyr Humphreys =

Welsh novelist (1919–2020)

- Born: 15 April 1919; Prestatyn, Wales
- Died: 30 September 2020 (aged 101); Llanfairpwll, Wales
- Education: University of Wales, Aberystwyth
- Spouse: Elinor Myfanwy Jones (m. 1946)
- Children: 4, including Dewi Humphreys
- Writing career
- Language: Welsh, English

Emyr Owen Humphreys, FRSL, FLSW (Welsh: [ˈɛmɨr]; 15 April 1919 – 30 September 2020) was a Welsh novelist, poet, and author. His career spanned from the 1940s until his retirement in 2009. He published in both English and Welsh.

== Early life and career ==
Humphreys was born on 15 April 1919 at Prestatyn in Denbighshire. He was educated at Rhyl High School, where, as E. O. Humphreys, he started composing poetry and wrote for The Welsh Nationalist, the monthly English-language newspaper of the Welsh Nationalist Party, later called Plaid Cymru. He went on to study history and English at University of Wales, Aberystwyth, after winning a scholarship to study there. However, he did not graduate due to the start of the Second World War.

During the war, Humphreys registered as a conscientious objector and worked on a farm. He subsequently undertook relief work in Egypt and Italy. After the war he worked as a teacher, as a radio producer at the BBC, and later became a lecturer in drama at Bangor University. Having become fluent in the Welsh language while at Aberystwyth, Humphreys went on to learn Italian while working in Italy after the war, and spent time there as well as studying the country's literature.

== Writings ==
The stories of Humphreys are based on Celtic myths, and in particular the myth of Blodeuwedd which has been incorporated in his writings throughout his career. One of the major themes of his writings is Welsh identity. The Little Kingdom (1946) is written in English; however, the main characters are talking Welsh.

Humphreys's best known novel is A Toy Epic (1958). The story is a coming-of-age story of three boys, and an important war novel, however it is also a coming-of-age story of Wales itself. He took a different viewpoint in Outside the House of Baal (1965), and wrote the novel from a perspective of old age.

Humphreys's masterpiece was The Land of the Living (1974–2001), an epic sequence of seven novels charting the political and cultural history of twentieth-century Wales. Humphreys remarked in a 2018 interview that he wanted to tell a story from "cradle to the grave".

During his long bilingual writing career, he published over twenty novels. He also wrote plays for stage and television, short stories, The Taliesin Tradition (a cultural history of Wales), and published his Collected Poems in 1999. His final work was The Woman at the Window (2009) in which one of the characters says: "My useful life is over".

His papers, held by the National Library of Wales, include correspondence with writers, performers and other public figures, such as Dannie Abse, Philip Burton, Hywel Teifi Edwards, T. S. Eliot, Gwynfor Evans, Patrick Heron, Marghanita Laski and R. S. Thomas.

== Honours ==
Among many honours, he was awarded the Somerset Maugham Award in 1953 for Hear and Forgive. Humphreys won the Wales Book of the Year Award in 1992 and 1999. Humphreys was a Fellow of the Royal Society of Literature and the Learned Society of Wales.

== Personal life ==
Humphreys married Elinor Myfanwy Jones in 1946. Together, they had four children including Dewi, Mair, Siôn and Robin. They travelled to Austria after he won the Somerset Maugham Award, which stipulated that the prize money was to be used for travel abroad.

Humphreys retired in 2009 aged 90 after his final book was published. He reached his centenary on 15 April 2019. He died on 30 September 2020 at his home in Llanfairpwll, Anglesey, aged 101.

== Bibliography ==
- Emyr Humphreys bibliography
