= Rachel Trezise =

Welsh author (born 1978)

- Born: 1978 (age 47–48); Cwmparc, Rhondda, Wales
- Occupation: Writer
- Writing career
- Language: English
- Period: 2000–present
- Notable work: Fresh Apples (2005)
- Notable awards: Dylan Thomas Prize (2006)

Rachel Trezise (born 1978) is a Welsh author. Her debut collection of short stories, Fresh Apples, won the inaugural Dylan Thomas Prize in 2006.

== Early life ==
Rachel Trezise was born in Cwmparc, Rhondda in 1978. Her family is of Cornish origin. She was educated at Treorchy Comprehensive School before going on to study at the University of Glamorgan (now the University of South Wales) and the University of Limerick.

== Career ==
Trezise's first novel, In and Out of the Goldfish Bowl, was published by Parthian in 2002 while she was still a student. It received broad critical acclaim, and saw her named as a 'new face of literature' by Harpers & Queen in 2003. Trezise followed up this early success with contributions to the anthologies Wales Half Welsh (Bloomsbury, 2004), Urban Welsh: New Welsh Fiction (Parthian, 2005) and Sideways Glances (Parthian, 2005).

Trezise's second book, Fresh Apples, was a wry, gritty collection of short fiction describing life in the mining valleys of south Wales. Published by Parthian in 2005, it won the inaugural Dylan Thomas Prize for writers under 30.

Trezise grew up listening to rock music in the late 1980s, and held a long ambition to write a rockumentary. In 2007, Parthian published Dial M for Merthyr, Trezise's account of her time spent on tour with Welsh rock band Midasuno. Trezise also contributed a short story, "On the Strip", to The Empty Page: Fiction Inspired by Sonic Youth, published by Serpent's Tail in 2008. The story takes its title and inspiration from a song on Sonic Youth's 1992 album Dirty.

She wrote the play Cotton Fingers about a woman travelling from Belfast to Wales for an abortion for the National Theatre Wales as part of its Love Letters to The NHS season in commemoration 70th birthday of the NHS.

== Bibliography ==
=== Fiction ===
- 2002: In and Out of the Goldfish Bowl, Parthian
- 2005: Fresh Apples, Parthian
- 2010: Loose Connections, Accent
- 2010: Sixteen Shades of Crazy, Blue Door
- 2013: Cosmic Latte, Parthian
- 2021: Easy Meat, Parthian

=== Non-fiction ===
- 2007: Dial M for Merthyr, Parthian

== Drama ==
- I Sing of a Maiden (Theatre, Chapter Arts Centre, 2007)
- Lemon Meringue Pie (Radio, BBC Radio 4, 2008)
- Jack (Radio, BBC Radio 4, 2010)
