= Welsh literature in English =

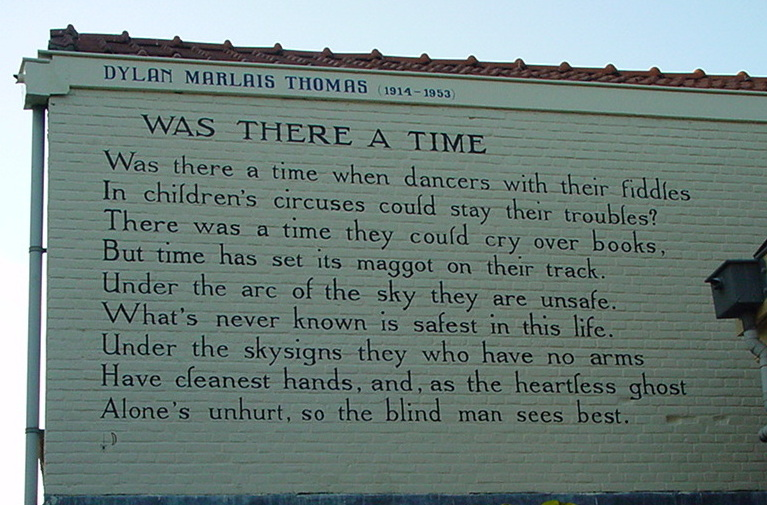
One of the most well known of Wales' modern poets, Dylan Thomas' published his works exclusively in English. (Thomas' poem "Was there a time" depicted on a building's external wall in the city of Leiden, Netherlands

Welsh writing in English is a term used to describe works written in the English language by Welsh writers.

The term 'Anglo-Welsh' replaced an earlier attempt to define this category of writing as 'Anglo-Cymric'. The form 'Anglo-Welsh' was used by Idris Bell in 1922 and revived by Raymond Garlick and Roland Mathias when they renamed their literary periodical Dock Leaves as The Anglo-Welsh Review and later further defined the term in their anthology Anglo-Welsh Poetry 1480-1980 as denoting a literature in which "the first element of the compound being understood to specify the language and the second the provenance of the writing". Although recognised as a distinctive entity only since the 20th century, Garlick and Mathias sought to identify a tradition of writing in English in Wales going back much further. The need for a separate identity for this kind of writing arose because the term 'Welsh Literature' describes Welsh-language literature which has its own continuous tradition going back to the sixth century poem known as Y Gododdin.

== Introduction ==
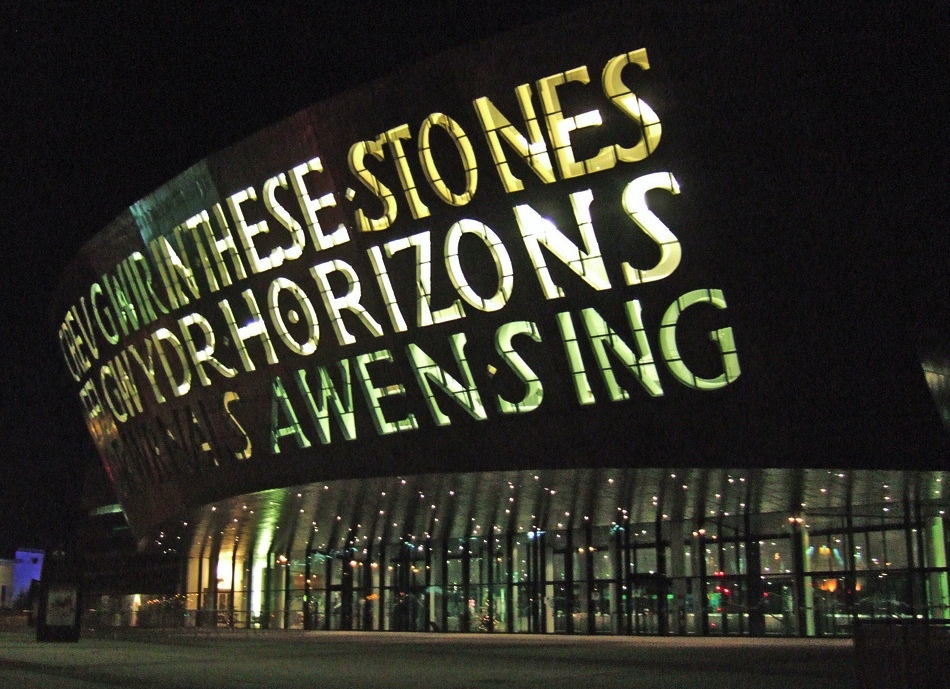
The Wales Millennium Centre at night whose bilingual inscription consciously evokes Wales's dual literary tradition.

The phrase "Welsh writing in English" has replaced the earlier "Anglo-Welsh literature" because many Welsh writers in English have felt that the latter usage failed to give "Welsh status to Welsh people who, not speaking Cymraeg, nevertheless do not feel at all English". Welsh writers in English in the early twentieth century favoured poetry and the short story over the novel, with some notable exceptions. This was for two main reasons: in a society lacking sufficient wealth to support professional writers, the amateur writer was able to spare time only for short bursts of creativity and these forms concentrated linguistic delight and exuberance. Since the main market was London publishers, the early short stories tended to focus on the eccentricities – as seen from a metropolitan viewpoint – of Welsh rural life, though later work focused on life in the industrial valleys of South Wales. A genre of poetry also developed which consciously located itself in association with poetry in the Welsh language and this emphasis led some writers to question the term "Anglo-Welsh" and favour the alternative "Welsh Writing in English" as emphasising the Welsh provenance rather than the English language. Recently the more neutral term "Anglophone Writing from Wales" has been employed.

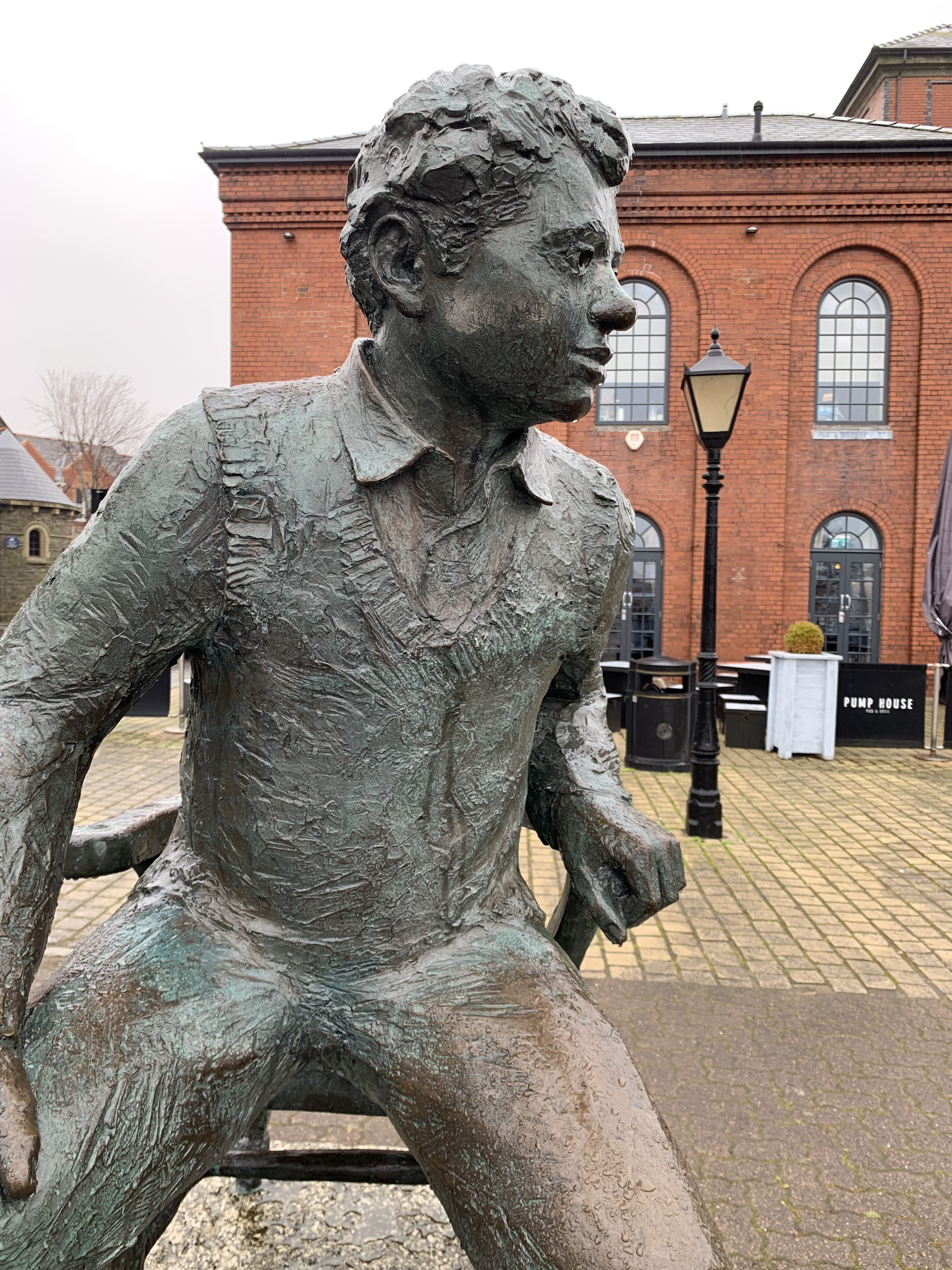
Dylan Thomas statue, Swansea Marina

There is no final, clear definition of what constitutes a Welsh writer in English, or Anglo-Welsh author. Obviously it includes Welsh writers whose first language is English, rather than Welsh, such as Swansea born Dylan Thomas (1914–53) and novelist Emyr Humphreys, born in Prestatyn in 1919. But it also includes those born outside Wales with Welsh parentage, who were influenced by their Welsh roots, like London-born poet David Jones (1895–1974). Glyn Jones in The Dragon Has Two Tongues defines the Anglo-Welsh as "those Welsh men and women who write in English about Wales".

In addition, writers born outside Wales, who have both lived in as well as written about Wales, are often included, such as John Cowper Powys (1872–1963), who settled in Wales in 1935 and wrote two major novels, Owen Glendower (1941) and Porius: A Romance of the Dark Ages (1951), that have Welsh subject matter. In addition to using Welsh history and settings, Powys also uses the mythology of The Mabinogion. He also studied the Welsh language. Then there is the poet, teacher, and critic Jeremy Hooker (born 1941), who taught at the University of Wales, Aberystwyth from 1965 to 1984 and became deeply involved in writing about and teaching Welsh writing in English during this time, though he wrote only a few poems with Welsh subject matter. The Liverpool-born novelist James Hanley (1897–1985) lived in Wales from 1931 until 1963 and was buried there. Hanley published, Grey Children: A Study in Humbug and Misery (1937), a study of unemployment in industrial South Wales and three novels set in Wales. As one writer notes: "a widely debatable area of Anglo-Welsh acceptability exists". Saunders Lewis, the noted Welsh-language poet, novelist, dramatist, and nationalist, in fact rejected the possibility of Anglo-Welsh literature because English is the official language of the British state, affirming that '"the literature which people called Anglo-Welsh was indistinguishable from English literature". Ironically, Saunders Lewis was himself born in Wallasey in England to a Welsh-speaking family.

The problems are perhaps epitomised by Roald Dahl, a writer of short stories and children's literature. Dahl was born in Wales, to Norwegian parents, and spent much of his life in England, and the Welsh influence on his work is not always immediately apparent. Thus he might be seen partly as a Welsh analogue to Northern Ireland's C.S. Lewis. Peter George is another example of a writer of Welsh origins who rarely wrote about Wales. Conversely, Eric Linklater was born in Penarth, but is generally considered a Scottish writer.

A further challenge for the definition of Welsh literature in English has come with the globalisation of culture. However, modern Welsh literature in English reflects a multicultural experience.

If a Welsh writer chooses to write in English, this does not mean that they are unable to speak Welsh as well. In some cases, such as Jan Morris or Gillian Clarke, English-language writers have chosen to learn Welsh. In others, a native Welsh speaker such as Siân James or Jo Walton may choose to write some, or all of their work in English. Writing for an English-language market does not necessarily mean that they have abandoned a Welsh language audience.

== The beginnings ==
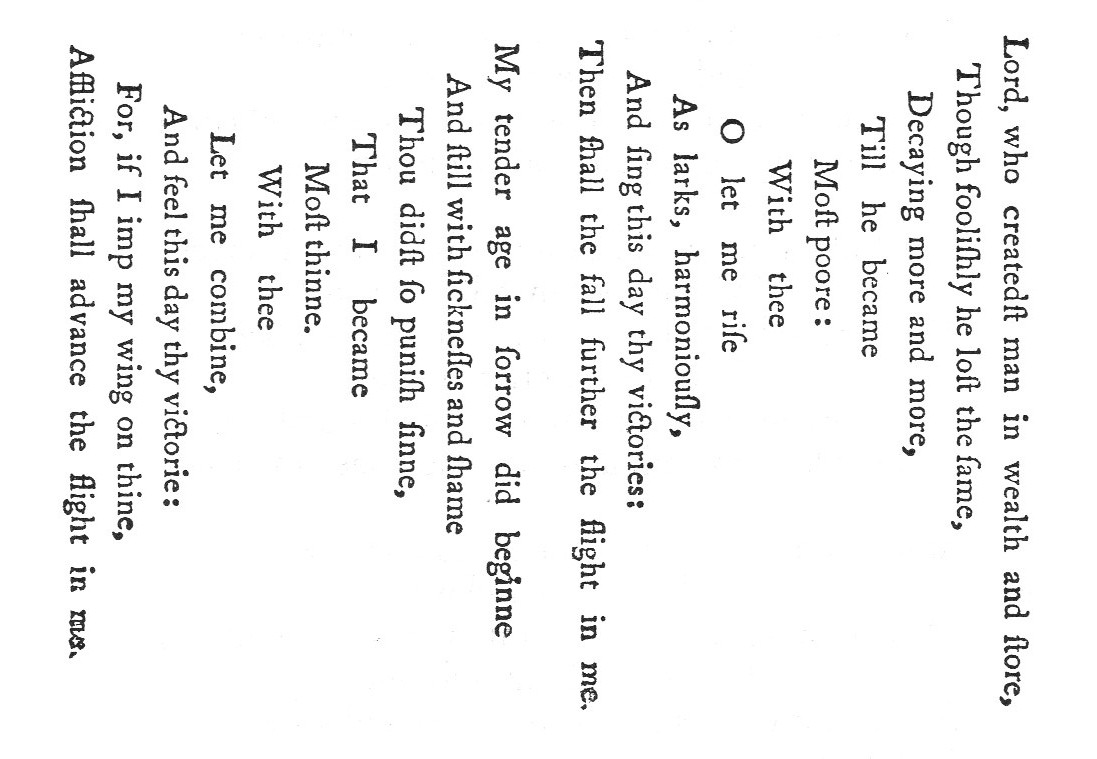
George Herbert's "Easter Wings", a pattern poem in which the work is not only meant to be read, but its shape is meant to be appreciated. In this case, the poem was printed (original image here shown) on two facing pages of a book, sideways, so that the lines suggest two birds flying upward, with wings spread out.

While Raymond Garlick discovered sixty-nine Welsh men and women who wrote in English prior to the twentieth century, Dafydd Johnston thinks it "debatable whether such writers belong to a recognisable Anglo-Welsh literature, as opposed to English literature in general". Well into the nineteenth century English was spoken by relatively few in Wales, and prior to the early twentieth century there are only three major Welsh-born writers who wrote in the English language: George Herbert (1593–1633) from Montgomeryshire, Henry Vaughan (1622–1695) from Brecknockshire, and John Dyer (1699–1757) from Carmarthenshire. While some see them as clearly belonging to the English tradition, Belinda Humphrey believes that both Vaughan and Dyer are Anglo-Welsh poets because, unlike Herbert, they are "rooted creatively in the Welsh countryside of their birth". Furthermore, she suggests in Vaughan's case the possible influence of the tradition of Welsh-language poetry. Writers from medieval Wales such as Geoffrey of Monmouth and Adam of Usk also used Latin and Norman French, in addition to English and Welsh.

Welsh writing in English might be said to begin with the fifteenth-century bard Ieuan ap Hywel Swrdwal (?1430 – ?1480), whose Hymn to the Virgin was written at Oxford in England in about 1470 and uses a Welsh poetic form, the awdl, and Welsh orthography; for example:

O mighti ladi, owr leding – tw haf

At hefn owr abeiding:

Yntw ddy ffast eferlasting
I set a braents ws tw bring.

A rival claim for the first Welsh writer to use English creatively is made for the poet, John Clanvowe (1341–1391). Clanvowe's best-known work was The Book of Cupid, God of Love or The Cuckoo and the Nightingale. which is influenced by Chaucer's Parliament of Fowls. The Cuckoo and the Nightingale had previously been attributed to Chaucer but the Encyclopedia of Medieval Literature notes the absence of direct evidence of that when linking Clanvowe with the work. The poem is written as a literary dream vision and is an example of medieval debate poetry. A concerto inspired by the poem was composed by Georg Friedrich Handel. It apparently also influenced works by both John Milton and William Wordsworth. Clanvowe also wrote The Two Ways, a penitential treatise.

== Foundations ==
The beginnings of an Anglo-Welsh tradition are found by some in the novels of Allen Raine (Anne Adalisa (Evans) Puddicombe) (1836–1908), from Newcastle Emlyn, Carmarthenshire, whose work, Stephen Thomas Knight proposes, "realised a real, if partial, separate identity and value for a Welsh social culture". (Other possible precursors are Monmouthshire-born Arthur Machen (1863–1947), and Joseph Keating (1871–1934), who began his working life as a South Wales miner.) However, many see the Carmarthenshire-born satirical short-story writer and novelist Caradoc Evans (1878–1945) as the first—or first modern—Welsh writer in English. His short-story collections My People (1915) and Capel Sion (1916) were highly controversial, and Roland Mathias bitterly comments that "No other Anglo-Welsh prose writer. .. displayed such ill will to Wales or to Welsh people". W. H. Davies (1871–1940), born in Newport, became famous principally for his The Autobiography of a Super-Tramp which was set mostly in North America. The principal themes in his work are observations about life's hardships, the ways in which the human condition is reflected in nature, his own tramping adventures and the various characters he met. In his poetry he was particularly inspired by birds, the weather and the seasons. His prose works were nearly all autobiographical and were sometimes, as with his 1918 "A Poet's Pilgrimage (or A Pilgrimage in Wales)", set in his homeland. (See also Gerard Manley Hopkins (1844–89), Edward Thomas (1878–1917) and Joseph Keating (1871–1934).)

In Parenthesis, a modernist epic poem by David Jones (1895–1974) first published in 1937, is probably the best known contribution from Wales to the literature of the First World War.

To a large extent, though not entirely, "The first flowering of Welsh writing in English" was in industrial South Wales and this was linked to the rapid decline in the use of the Welsh language in the twentieth century, especially in this region. David Jones and Dylan Thomas are two writers of the 1930s who do not fit into this paradigm.

=== Early drama ===
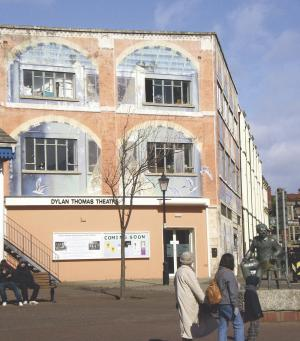
Dylan Thomas Little Theatre, Swansea

One of the chief impediments to the development of Welsh theatre (in both English and Welsh), throughout much of history, was the lack of major urban centres. With the growth of Swansea and Cardiff, this situation changed, but many churchmen opposed it. The Methodist Convention in 1887 recommended that chapels regard theatrical activity as an immoral practice on a par with gambling. It was not until 1902 when David Lloyd George called for patronage of Welsh drama at the National Eisteddfod that a profile of respectability started to be acquired among devout communities.

The English language classical repertoire was first brought to those who could understand it by travelling troupes such as the Kemble family (Charles Kemble was born at Brecon in 1775). With the advance of the English language, theatre in English developed quickly between 1875 and 1925. By 1912 Wales had 34 theatres and many halls licensed for dramatic performances. However, the arrival of sound cinema in the 1930s led to the closure or transformation of most theatres.

Emlyn Williams (1905–1987) became an overnight star with his thriller Night Must Fall (1935), in which he also played the lead role of a psychopathic murderer. The play was noted for its exploration of the killer's complex psychological state, a step forward for its genre. It was made into a film in 1937 and has been frequently revived. The Corn is Green (1938) was partly based on his own childhood in Wales. He starred as a Welsh schoolboy in the play's London premiere. The play came to Broadway in 1940 and was turned into a film. His autobiographical light comedy, The Druid's Rest was first performed at the St Martin's Theatre, London, in 1944. It saw the stage debut of Richard Burton whom Williams had spotted at an audition in Cardiff.

== 1930s and wartime: The First Wave ==
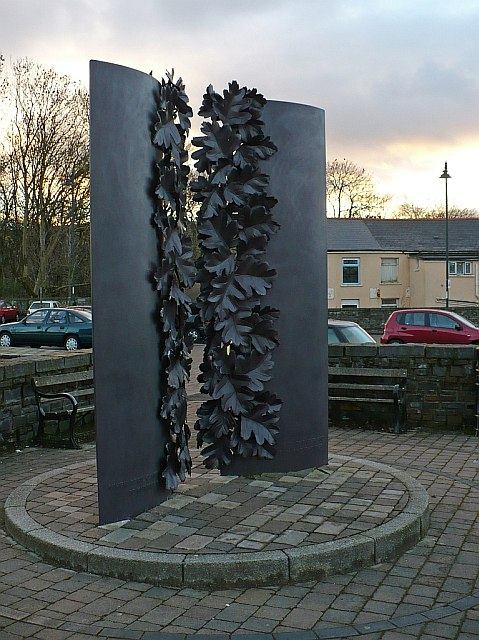
Memorial to Idris Davies in Rhymney, Monmouthshire

During the nineteenth century the use of the Welsh language declined generally in Wales, with the development of compulsory education in the English language, but more so in the south because of immigration from England and Ireland as a result of industrialisation. This loss of language was an important factor in the development of Anglo-Welsh writing in South Wales, especially in the mining valleys. While some of these authors came from Welsh-speaking families, they generally tended to associate this language with the repressive religion of Nonconformist chapels.

The Anglo-Welsh writers of the 1930s had to look to London for publication and the possibility of literary success; though gradually, beginning in 1937, Welsh writing in English received encouragement from Welsh-based literary and critical journals, initially Wales, published by Keidrych Rhys in three intermittent series between 1937 and 1960. Next came the Welsh Review, published by Gwyn Jones, first in 1939 and then between 1944 and 1948. (See also Life and Letters Today, which between 1938 and 1950 contained works by and about many Welsh writers in English.)

=== Fiction ===
An early work of the first wave of Anglo-Welsh writers was The Withered Root (1927) by Rhys Davies (1901–78) from the Rhondda Valley. While he probably wrote more fiction about the industrial world of the South Wales Valleys than anyone else, Rhys Davies was in fact a grocer's son who was living in London by the time he was twenty. Unlike that of other writers from the mining community, his fiction is more concerned with individuals, in particular women, than with politics. D. H. Lawrence was a major influence on Rhys, though similarities with Caradoc Evans have been noted, and it has been suggested that he had "The tendency to process images of the Welsh valleys for consumption by English audiences". Another Anglo-Welsh novelist (and playwright) was Jack Jones (1884–1970), a miner's son from Merthyr Tydfil who was himself a miner from the age of 12. He was active in the union movement and politics, starting with the Communist Party, but in the course of his life he was involved, to some degree, with all the major British parties. Amongst his novels of working-class life are Rhondda Roundabout (1935) and Bidden to the Feast (1938). The political development of a young miner is the subject of Cwmardy (1937), Lewis Jones's (1897–1939) largely autobiographical novel.

Gwyn Thomas (1913–81) was also a coalminer's son from the Rhondda, but won a scholarship to Oxford and then became a schoolmaster. He wrote 11 novels as well as short stories, plays, and radio and television scripts, most of which focused on unemployment in the Rhondda Valley in the 1930s. He has been described by Stephen Thomas Knight as "about the most verbally brilliant writer of Welsh fiction in English". His inaugural novel Sorrow for Thy Sons (1937) was rejected by Gollancz and not published until 1986. Thomas's first accepted book was a collection of short stories, Where Did I Put My Pity: Folk-Tales From the Modern Welsh, which appeared in 1946. He was also known for his negative attitude to the Welsh language, and Glyn Jones sees him as falling "short of being a completely representative figure ... in his attitude to Wales and Welshness," as Gwyn Thomas "appears in his writing to have little sympathy with the national aspirations and indigenous culture of our country". Another writer who escaped from his proletarian background was Gwyn Jones (1907–1999). He wrote about this world in novels and short stories, including Times Like These (1936) which explores the life of a working-class family during the 1926 miners' strike. Jones founded The Welsh Review in 1939, which he edited until 1948; this journal was important for raising discussion of Welsh issues. What is probably the most famous novel about Wales, Richard Llewellyn's How Green Was My Valley, was published in 1939. It is described by Glyn Jones in The Dragon Has Two Tongues as a "staggering and accomplished piece of literary hokum" (p. 51), "a book [that Jones finds] impossible to take seriously, though much of it [he] read with absorption" (p. 53). (See also Margiad Evans [Peggy Eileen Whistler] (1909–58); Richard Hughes (1900–76); Alexander Cordell (1914–97).)

=== Poetry ===
The mining valleys produced a significant working-class poet in Idris Davies (1905–53), who worked as a coal miner before qualifying as a teacher. He initially wrote in Welsh "but rebellion against chapel religion", along with the "inspirational influence of English" poets, led him to write in English. Gwalia Deserta (1938) is about the Great Depression, while the subject of The Angry Summer (1943) is the 1926 miners' strike.

There are a number of other authors who published before the Second World War but who did not come from the South Wales valleys.

Amongst these was Swansea suburbanite Dylan Thomas (1914–53), whose first collection, 18 Poems, was published in 1934. Then there is Geraint Goodwin (1903–41) from Newtown in mid-Wales, who, in such works as the novel The Heyday in the Blood (1936), wrote about declining rural communities in the border region. David Jones (1895–1974), whose father was from North Wales, was born in a London suburb. His epic poem In Parenthesis, which deals with his World War I experiences, was published in 1937. Another Swansea poet Vernon Watkins (1906–67) likewise does not belong with the main group of writers of the so-called First Wave from the South Wales mining communities. Roland Mathias suggests that "his use of Welsh tradition was highly selective – only the ancient custom of the Mari Lwyd and the legend of Taliesin". Alun Lewis (1915–44), from Cwmaman near Aberdare, published both poetry and short fiction and might well have been a major figure in the decades after the war but for his early death.

== After 1945 ==
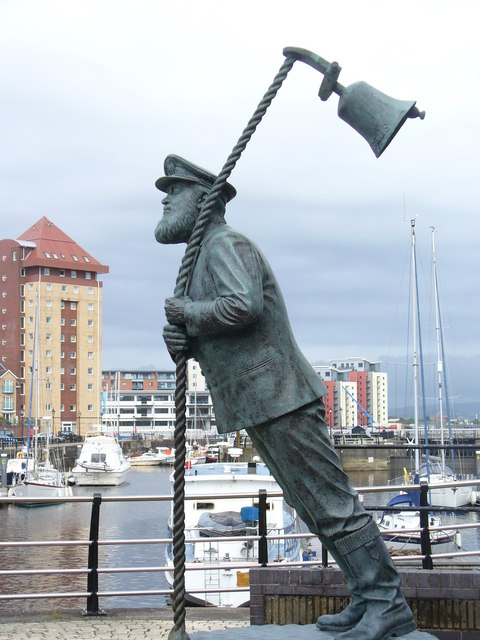
A statue of Captain Cat, a character from Under Milk Wood

The careers of some 1930s writers continued after World War Two, including those of Gwyn Thomas, Vernon Watkins, and Dylan Thomas, whose most famous work Under Milk Wood was first broadcast in 1954. The critic, novelist, and poet Glyn Jones's (1905–1995) career also began in the 1930s, but he belongs more to the later era, and one of his most important works, the novel The Island of Apples, was published in 1965. His first language had been Welsh but he chose to write in English. James A. Davies describes him as "a considerable talent in need of the great editor he never managed to find".

=== Poetry ===
David Jones also first published in the late 1930s, yet he belongs more to the post-war era. Tony Conran in 2003 suggested that it was not until the late sixties, "with the 'fragments' that were to be collected in The Sleeping Lord (1974), that his work began to enter our bloodstream and be seen as a significant part of the Anglo-Welsh renaissance".

The attitude of the post-war generation of Welsh writers in English towards Wales differs from the previous generation, in that they were more sympathetic to Welsh nationalism and to the Welsh language. The change can be linked to the nationalist fervour generated by Saunders Lewis and the burning of the Bombing School on the Lleyn Peninsula in 1936, along with a sense of crisis generated by World War II. In poetry R. S. Thomas (1913–2000) was the most important figure throughout the second half of the twentieth century, beginning with The Stones of the Field in 1946 and concluding with No Truce with the Furies (1995). While he "did not learn the Welsh language until he was 30 and wrote all his poems in English", he wanted the Welsh language to be made the first language of Wales, and the official policy of bilingualism abolished. He wrote his autobiography in Welsh, but said he lacked the necessary grasp of the language to employ it in his poems. Although an Anglican priest, he was a fervent nationalist and advocated non-violent action against English owners of holiday homes in Wales. As an admirer of Saunders Lewis, Thomas defended his need to use English: "Since there is in Wales a mother tongue that continues to flourish, a proper Welshman can only look on English as a means of rekindling interest in the Welsh language, and of leading people back to the mother tongue."

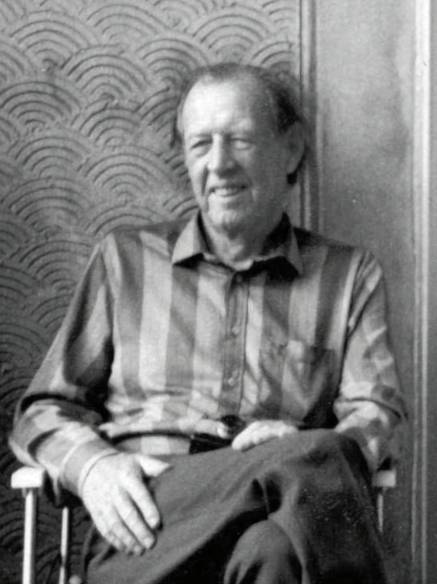
Raymond Williams

=== Fiction ===
In the field of fiction the major figure in the second half of the twentieth century was Emyr Humphreys (1919). Humphreys' first novel The Little Kingdom was published in 1946; and during his long writing career he has published over twenty novels. These include A Toy Epic (1958), Outside the House of Baal (1965), and a sequence of seven novels, The Land of the Living, which surveys the political and cultural history of twentieth-century Wales. With regard to the fact that he wrote in English, Humphreys refers to "using the language of cultural supremacy to try to express something that comes directly from the suppressed native culture" of Wales. His most recent work is the collection of short stories, The Woman in the Window (2009).

Bill Hopkins (1928–2011) was aligned with the existentialist wing of the "angry young men" movement. His only novel, The Divine and the Decay (1957), created a scandal with its Nietzschean themes, and the reactions made him abandon what would have been his second novel.

At a local level Fred Hando (1888–1970) chronicled and illustrated the history, character and folklore of Monmouthshire (which he also called Gwent), in a series of over 800 articles and several books published between the 1920s and 1960s.

=== Drama ===
Under Milk Wood is a 1954 radio drama by Dylan Thomas, adapted later as a stage play. The play had its first reading on stage on 14 May 1953, in New York, at The Poetry Center at 92nd Street Y.

== 1960s and after ==
Roald Dahl Plass, Cardiff

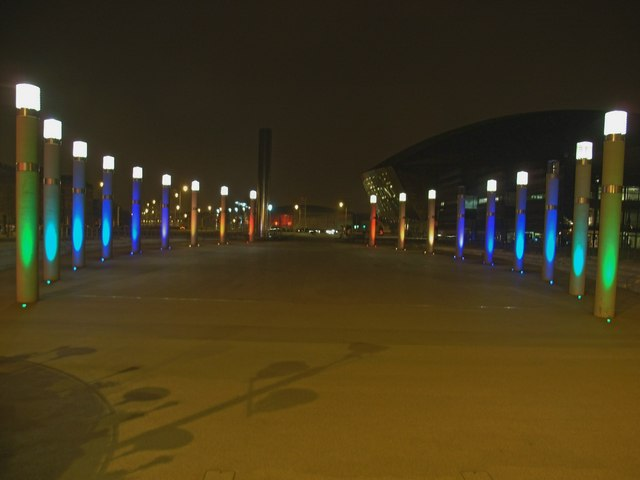
Roald Dahl Plass, Cardiff, illuminated at night

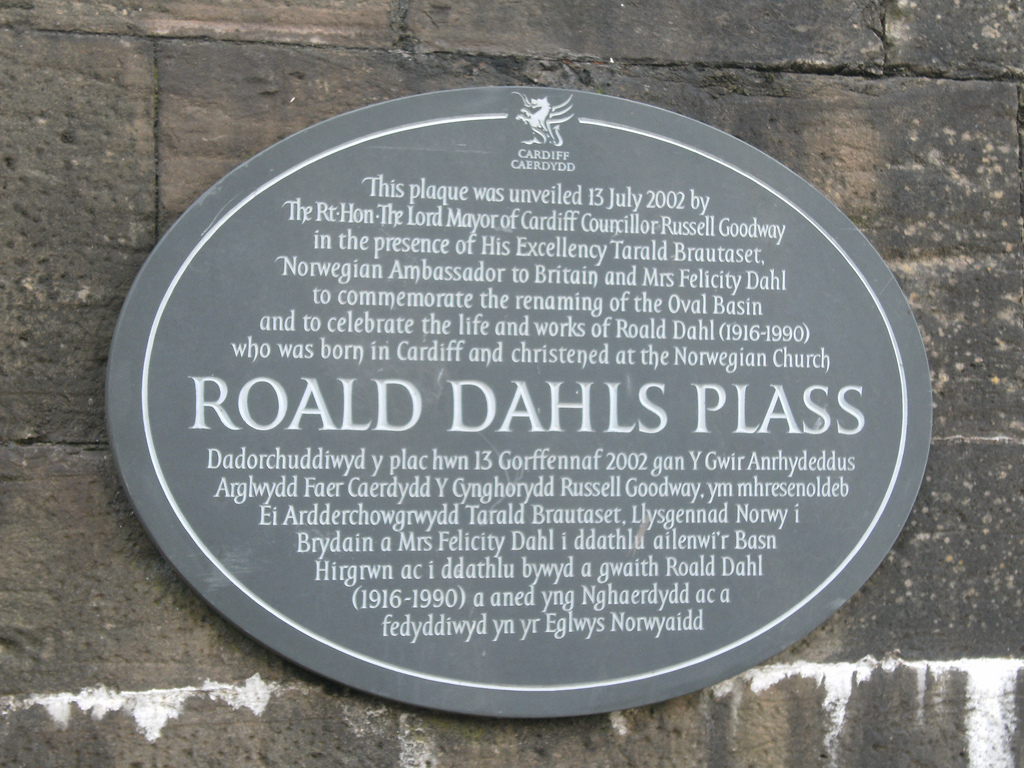
Plaque commemorating Roald Dahl

While the second half of the twentieth century saw the serious decline of Welsh heavy industry, along with serious unemployment and the hardship and suffering that came with it, it also saw significant cultural gains with regard to a separate Welsh identity within the British Isles, starting with the appointing of a Secretary of State for Wales in 1964, and the establishment of a Welsh Office in Cardiff the following year. With these developments came an Arts Council for Wales. For the Welsh-speaking minority there was the Welsh Language Act of 1967, and – from the 1970s – the establishment of more schools using Welsh as their primary means of instruction (see education in Wales). A Welsh-language TV channel was set up in 1982. The culmination of this trend was the creation of a National Assembly for Wales in 1999. The defeat of the first Welsh devolution referendum in 1979 had been a grave disappointment to Welsh nationalists.

The expansion in the publication of Anglo-Welsh writers in Wales in journal and book form was important for the further development of Welsh writing in English. This included The Welsh Review (1939–1948), and Dock Leaves which later became The Anglo-Welsh Review (1949–1987) and continues (from 1988) as the New Welsh Review. In 1967 another important Anglo-Welsh journal, Poetry Wales, was founded by Meic Stephens, assisted by Harri Webb. Shortly thereafter, in 1970, Planet was launched by Ned Thomas and subsequently edited by the poet and essayist John Barnie. In the early 1990s came the yearly Welsh Writing in English: A Yearbook of Critical Essays edited by M. Wynn Thomas & Tony Brown.

Amongst book publishers, the University of Wales Press, founded in 1922, has been influential. Poetry Wales became involved with publishing, firstly as Poetry Wales Press, and then, since 1985, as Seren Books. Y Lolfa, founded in the 1960s as a Welsh-language publishing house, later began producing English-language books on subjects of Welsh interest. Gomer Press, based in Llandysul, Carmarthenshire, is another supporter of Welsh writing in English. It was established in 1892 and claims to be '"the largest publishing house in Wales". A more recent addition to Welsh publishing in English is Honno Press, which specialises in women writers.

=== Fiction ===
The problems of post-industrial South Wales of the 1960s and 1970s is the subject for novelists such as Alun Richards (1929–2004) and Ron Berry (1920–97). Both use humour in their bitter description of the spiritual decay of the South Wales Valleys, where the heavy industries of iron and steel and coal have disappeared, to be replaced by high-technology industrial parks. Similar themes are expressed in the novels of a younger generation, as in Christopher Meredith's (born 1954) Shifts (1988), which deals with the closing of a steel mill, and Duncan Bush's (born 1946) grim portrait of urban isolation Glass Shot (1991). The body of Meredith's fiction, as well as his poetry, ranges much more widely, including historical fiction and bleak comedy.

Another important novelist of the post-Second-World-War era was Raymond Williams (1921–88). Born near Abergavenny, Williams continued the earlier tradition of writing from a left-wing perspective on the Welsh industrial scene in his trilogy Border Country (1960), Second Generation (1964), and The Fight for Manod (1979). He also enjoyed a reputation as a cultural historian. He was an influential figure within the New Left and in wider circles. His writings on politics, the mass media, and literature are a significant contribution to the Marxist critique of culture and the arts. His work laid the foundations for the field of cultural studies and the cultural materialist approach.

The subject matter of the Cardiff-born Booker Prize-winner Bernice Rubens (1928–2004) is quite different. She was a member of Cardiff's small Jewish community; and associated themes were a central concern of much of her writing, including Brothers (1983), where parallels with her own ancestry are obvious: it follows four generations of a family which flees Russia for South Wales. As only a couple of her 25 novels have a Welsh setting she does not fit the narrower definitions of Welsh writing in English.

=== Poetry ===
While the Welsh writing in English scene tended to be dominated by fiction in the 1930s, in the latter part of the twentieth century poetry flourished. A landmark event was the 1967 publication of Bryn Griffith's anthology Welsh Voices, which, in Tony Conran's words, was "the most lively and exciting selection of contemporary Anglo-Welsh poetry ever to have appeared". Tony Conran (born 1931) is an important figure in this so-called second flowering as critic, poet, and translator of Welsh poetry. His Penguin Book of Welsh Verse (1967) has been especially helpful in bridging the gap between the Welsh and English speaking. In his own poetry he makes use of Welsh tradition: for example, his elegy for Welsh soldiers killed in the Falklands War is modelled on Aneirin's Y Gododdin. Swansea poet Harri Webb's (1920–1994) verse, including The Green Desert (1969), is marked in its themes by a radical and uncompromising commitment to Welsh nationalist politics. Another important poet of the late twentieth century is Tony Curtis (born 1946) from Carmarthen: he is the author of several collections, most recently War Voices (1995), The Arches (1998), and Heaven's Gate (2001). John Tripp (1927–86), a convinced Welsh nationalist, was ironically aware of the fact that, while born in Wales, he had worked outside the Principality until his early forties. Robert Minhinnick, born in 1952, is a notable writer from the second half of the twentieth century. He has been the winner of a Society of Authors Eric Gregory Award, and has twice won the Forward Prize for best individual poem, while his collections of essays have twice won the Wales Book of the Year Award. Minhinnick edited Poetry Wales magazine from 1997 to 2008. His first novel, Sea Holly (2007) was shortlisted for the 2008 Royal Society of Literature's Ondaatje Prize.

Welsh writing in English tended from the beginning to be dominated by men, but the period after World War II produced some distinguished Welsh women poets, including Ruth Bidgood (born 1922), Gillian Clarke (born 1937), and Sheenagh Pugh (born 1950). Pugh was born in Birmingham, but lived for many years in Cardiff and taught creative writing at the University of Glamorgan until retiring in 2008. Her collection Stonelight (1999) won the Wales Book of the Year Award in 2000. She has twice won the Cardiff International Poetry Competition. She has also published novels. She now lives in Shetland.

Although Ruth Bidgood was born near Neath in 1922, her first collection The Given Time appeared only in 1972. Gillian Clarke is a poet, playwright, editor, broadcaster, lecturer and translator from Welsh. She was born in Cardiff and raised there, in Penarth, and in Pembrokeshire. Both her parents were native Welsh speakers, yet she was brought up speaking English and learnt Welsh only as an adult. In the mid-1980s she moved to rural Ceredigion, West Wales. She became the third National Poet for Wales in 2008.

Amongst other poets of the second half of the twentieth century, the names of Roland Mathias (1915–2007), Leslie Norris (1921–2006), John Ormond (1923–1990), Dannie Abse (1923–2014), Raymond Garlick (1926–2011), Peter Finch (born 1947), Tony Curtis (b. 1946), Nigel Jenkins (1953–2014), Mike Jenkins (born 1953), Paul Henry (born 1959), Christopher Meredith and Paul Groves (born 1947) have a significant place. With regard to the current situation of Welsh poetry in English, Ian Gregson suggests that "much of the most exciting poetry in Britain is being written in Wales". He singles out Oliver Reynolds (born 1957), Gwyneth Lewis (born 1959), and Stephen Knight (born 1960) as having fulfilled "their early promise".

John Idris Jones (1938–2020) was a poet, translator, and historian from Ruthin, Denbighshire. Writing in English, his work explored Welsh landscapes, cultural memory, and identity. His poetry is anthologised in Poetry 1900–2000: One Hundred Poets from Wales (Library of Wales, 2007).

== 21st century ==
=== Fiction ===
Amongst more recent Welsh writers in English, Niall Griffiths is notable for his novels Grits (2000) and Sheepshagger (2001), which portray a grittier side to Welsh literature; and Malcolm Pryce who has written a number of humorous send ups of noir, such as Aberystwyth Mon Amour (2001). Both of these writers were born in England, but have Welsh roots and are now Wales based, and write much on Welsh subject matter. Nikita Lalwani is originally from Rajasthan in India, but was raised in Wales, and her novel Gifted (2007) was nominated for the Man Booker Prize. Trezza Azzopardi's debut novel The Hiding Place (2000) was also nominated for the Booker Prize, and the Geoffrey Faber Memorial Prize, winning the latter. It is the story of the Maltese community in Cardiff. Jan Morris is better known as a non-fiction writer, but she has written some fiction too: her novel Hav won the 2007 Arthur C. Clarke Award. Brian John came to creative writing late, after a career in university teaching and academic research. His eight-novel Angel Mountain Saga, set in north Pembrokeshire in the Regency and early Victorian period, is effectively a portrayal of "Mother Wales" in the persona of the heroine Martha Morgan. He has also written four volumes of Pembrokeshire folk tales, and two other novels. One of these, written for children, won the Wishing Shelf Award in 2012. John Evans is one of Wales' most uncompromising writers, a former punk rocker, poet, filmmaker and novelist; he has also campaigned against the Badger cull alongside Brian May and other celebrities.

=== Poetry ===
Current Welsh poets have been surveyed in the University of Aberystwyth project, "Devolved Voices". This was a three-year research project, starting in September 2012, that investigated the state of Welsh poetry in English since the 1997 Welsh devolution referendum. Poets included were: Tiffany Atkinson, Zoe Brigley, Sarah Corbett, Damian Walford Davies, Nia Davies, Jasmine Donahaye, Joe Dunthorne, Jonathan Edwards, Rhian Edwards, Kristian Evans, Matthew Francis, Dai George, Ian Gregson, Philip Gross, Emily Hinshelwood, Meirion Jordan, Anna Lewis, Gwyneth Lewis, Patrick McGuiness, Andrew McNeillie, Kate North, Pascale Petit, clare e. potter, Deryn Rees-Jones, Fiona Sampson, Zoe Skoulding, Katherine Stansfield, Richard Marggraff Turley, Anna Wigley, and Samantha Wynn-Rhydderch.

Poet Mab Jones, the founder and editor of Black Rabbit Press, has won a number of awards, including the John Tripp Spoken Poetry Audience Prize, the Aurora Poetry Award, the Geoff Stevens Memorial Poetry Prize, and the Rabbit Heart Poetry Film Festival Grand Jury Prize. She also received a Creative Wales Award. She has presented two radio programmes for the BBC which featured Welsh poetry from the past to the present.

Contemporary poets also include Rhian Edwards, Meirion Jordan (born 1985), Nerys Williams, and Jonathan Edwards (born 1979). Rhian Edwards' debut collection Clueless Dogs was named the Wales Book of the Year in 2013. Jonathan Edwards' debut collection My Family and Other Superheroes won the Costa Book Award for Poetry in 2014. Meirion Jordan, who was born in Swansea, Wales, won the Newdigate Prize in 2007 and Seren has published two collections by him. Nerys Williams is originally from Pen-Y-Bont, Carmarthen in West Wales, and her collection of poetry Sound Archive (2011) was published by Seren and Cabaret by New Dublin Press in 2017. Williams, a native Welsh speaker, was a recipient of a Fulbright Scholar's Award at University of California at Berkeley, and is a recent winner of the Ted McNulty Poetry Prize from Poetry Ireland.

=== Drama ===
The National Theatre Wales, was founded in 2009, several years after Theatr Genedlaethol Cymru, its Welsh language equivalent. As well as non-Welsh productions, it aims to produce original English language works by Welsh playwrights.

== Literary awards ==
In addition to Anglo-Welsh writers winning awards outside Wales, there are also several Welsh awards that can be won by English language writers.

- Wales Book of the Year has sections for both English and Welsh, and fiction entries.
- The Tir na n-Og Award also has Welsh and English sections. The English-language award honours one children's book with an "authentic Welsh background" whose original language is English.
- The Poetry Book Awards is for poets in English, with a full book-length collection.
- The Dylan Thomas Prize is for writers in English, and has been won by both Welsh and non-Welsh writers.
- Welsh Poetry Competition: international English language poetry contest.

== See also ==
- Breton literature
- Cornish literature
- Gaelic literature
- Irish literature
- List of Welsh writers
- Literature of Wales (Welsh language)
- Scottish literature
- Theatre of Wales
- Welsh mythology

== Bibliography ==
- Anthony Conran, The Cost of Strangeness: Essays on the English Poets of Wales. Gwasg Gomer,1982.
- Raymond Garlick, An Introduction to Anglo-Welsh Literature. University of Wales Press: Cardiff, 1970.
- Katie Gramich, Twentieth-Century Women's Writing in Wales: Land, Gender, Belonging. University of Wales Press: Cardiff, 2007.
- Katie Gramich, ed., Mapping the Territory: Critical Approaches to Welsh Fiction in English. Parthian: Cardigan, 2010.
- Ian Gregson. The New Poetry in Wales. Cardiff: University of Wales Press, 2007.
- John Harris, A Bibliographical Guide to twenty-four Modern Anglo-Welsh Writers. University of Wales Press: Cardiff, 1994.
- Jeremy Hooker, The Presence of the Past: Essays on Modern British and American Poets. Poetry Wales Press: Brigend, 1987.
- Jeremy Hooker, Imagining Wales: A View of Modern Welsh Writing in English. University of Wales Press: Cardiff, 2001.
- Dafydd Johnston, A Pocket Guide: The Literature of Wales. University of Wales Press: Cardiff, 1994.
- Glyn Jones, The Dragon Has Two Tongues (1968). Revised edition, ed. Tony Brown. University of Wales Press: Cardiff, 2001.
- Stephen Knight, A Hundred years of Fiction: Writing Wales in English. University of Wales Press: Cardiff, 2004.
- Roland Mathias, Anglo-Welsh Literature: An Illustrated History . Poetry Wales Press: Brigend, 1987.
- Meic Stephens, ed., The New Companion to the Literature of Wales. University of Wales Press: Cardiff. 1998.
- M. Wynn Thomas, Internal Difference : Twentieth-Century Writing in Wales. Cardiff: University of Wales Press,1992.
- M. Wynn Thomas, Corresponding Cultures: The Two Literatures of Wales. University of Wales Press: Cardiff Press, 1999.
- M. Wynn Thomas, ed., Welsh Writing in English. University of Wales Press: Cardiff, 2003
- Ned Thomas, Welsh Extremist. Gollancz: London, 1971 (reprinted by Y Lolfa, 1991).
