= Raymond Garlick =

Anglo-Welsh poet

- Born: 21 September 1926; London, England, UK
- Died: 19 March 2011 (aged 84); Cardiff, Wales, UK
- Occupations: Poet and editor
- Spouse: Elin Hughes
- Children: Angharad Garlick and Iestyn Garlick

Raymond Garlick (21 September 1926 – 19 March 2011) was an Anglo-Welsh poet. He was also the first editor of The Anglo-Welsh Review, a lecturer, critic, and campaigner for the use of the Welsh language.

== Early life and studies ==
Raymond Garlick was born on 21 September 1926 at Harlesden in London, the elder son of an employee of the National Bank; but as a child he spent holidays at his grandparents' house in Deganwy in Conwy County Borough in Wales. When he was five years old a severe illness and operation left him with a permanently disabled foot. Just before World War II he was evacuated to Gwynedd, and was educated in Llandudno at the John Bright County School, where his interest in English language and literature was encouraged. He left school at the age of fifteen. Before he went on to study English literature at Bangor University he became interested in Christian theology, considered joining the Franciscan order, and studied for the Anglican presbyterate at the Community of the Resurrection near Leeds. At Bangor University he was taught by R. T. Jenkins, H. D. Lewis and Charles Davies, and became an admirer of the craftsmanship of the poets Dylan Thomas and Roy Campbell. He met the painter, Brenda Chamberlain, and when she separated from the artist John Petts and went to live on Bardsey island, he rented from her part of her cottage, Ty'r Mynydd.

== Career in literature ==
Between 1948 and 1960 Garlick worked as a teacher at Bangor, Pembroke Dock and Blaenau Ffestiniog. In 1948 he married Elin Hughes, a first-language Welsh speaker and convert to Roman Catholic Christianity. He became a Catholic on the eve of his wedding, and learnt Welsh from his wife. He and Elin adopted two children – Iestyn in 1952 and Angharad in 1958. The couple would remain together until the late 1970s.

After teaching at Bangor he moved to Pembroke Dock in April 1949, to take up a post teaching English at Pembroke Dock County School, under Roland Mathias. That year, at the age of twenty-three, he became a co-founder of the review, Dock Leaves (from 1958 renamed The Anglo-Welsh Review) and from 1949 to 1960 was its first editor. As editor he made contacts with many writers of Welsh and English; and during this time he also began broadcasting for the BBC. These years saw the appearance of his first books of poems – Poems from the Mountain House (1950), The Welsh-Speaking Sea (1954) and Requiem for a Poet (1954).

In 1954 he moved to teach at Blaenau Ffestiniog, as he and Elin decided that they would like their adopted son to be brought up bilingual in English and Welsh. At Blaenau John Cowper Powys was one of his neighbours. In 1957 he published his poems, Blaenau Observed.

In 1960 he left Wales, gave up his editorship of the Anglo-Welsh Review and began to teach at an international school at Eerde in the Netherlands. But in 1967 he returned to Wales, and eventually he became a Principal Lecturer, in charge of the Welsh Studies course, at Trinity College, Carmarthen (now part of the University of Wales, Trinity Saint David). There with enthusiasm he introduced his students to the works of such writers as David Jones, Idris Davies, Glyn Jones, Alun Lewis, Dylan Thomas, R. S. Thomas, John Ormond and Leslie Norris. His own poetry was influenced by the writings of Roy Campbell, and of R. S. Thomas and John Cowper Powys. During these years he published his A Sense of Europe (1968), A Sense of Time (1972) and Incense (1976), as well as his study, An Introduction to Anglo-Welsh Literature (1970) and the anthology, Anglo-Welsh Poetry 1480–1980 (1984) (which he edited with Roland Mathias). He also established a link with the Central University of Iowa, USA, for their module on Anglo-Welsh literature. He continued lecturing at Trinity until he retired in 1987, when his Collected Poems 1946–86 appeared. He continued to live at Carmarthen, until at the end of his life he moved to a care home in Cardiff.

In the 1970s he and his family took part in non-violent campaigning for the use of Welsh-language road signs in Wales, and at one point his wife and son were arrested. Garlick was a lifelong pacifist. In the late 70s his wife chose to go and live in the Netherlands, and in 1982 he and she divorced. He lost his faith in Christianity (calling himself a 'Catholic Agnostic'), and he omitted his Christian poems from his Collected Poems of 1987.

In his retirement Garlick brought out two more books of poems, Travel Notes (1992) and The Delphic voyage and other poems (2003).

In 1995, during Swansea's Year of Literature, a portrait of Garlick was made by the painter, Gordon Stuart.

He died on 19 March 2011 at Cardiff.

An extensive archive of his manuscripts is held at the National Library of Wales, Aberystwyth.

The poet Peter Finch, former chief executive of Academi (Literature Wales is the national company for the development of literature in Wales), described Raymond Garlick as one of the five best mid-20th century English writers in Wales – along with R. S. Thomas, Leslie Norris, John Tripp and Harri Webb.

== Works ==
- Poems from the Mountain-House (1950)
- The Welsh-Speaking Sea (1954)
- Requiem for a Poet (1954)
- Blaenau Observed (1957)
- Landscapes and figures: Selected poems 1949–63 (1964)
- A Sense of Europe: collected poems 1954–1968 (1968)
- An Introduction to Anglo-Welsh Literature (1970)
- A Sense of Time: poems and antipoems 1969–1972 (1972)
- Incense (1976)
- Anglo-Welsh Poetry 1480–1980 (edited, with R. Mathias) (1984)
- Collected Poems 1946 – 86 (1987)
- Travel Notes (1992)
- The Delphic Voyage and Other Poems (2003)
