= Jeremy Hooker =

British writer (born 1941)

Jeremy Hooker FRSL FLSW (born 1941 in Warsash, Hampshire; died December 2025) was an English poet, critic, teacher, and broadcaster. Central to his work are a concern with the relationship between personal identity and place.

Hooker taught at the University of Wales, Aberystwyth, the University of Groningen in the Netherlands, Bath College of Higher Education, Le Moyne College, New York State, and University of Glamorgan, from which he retired in 2008.

== Biography ==
Hooker grew up on the edge of the New Forest village of Pennington, about two miles north of Lymington. After studying at the University of Southampton, Hooker lectured at the University of Wales, Aberystwyth. First living in Aberystwyth, but then in 1969 moving to the nearby Welsh-speaking parish of Llangwyryfon. Hooker left Llangwyrfron around 1980, when he spent two years as a creative writing fellow at Winchester School of Art.

In 1984 he left the University of Wales, Aberystwyth. Subsequently, he lived for a while in the Netherlands, teaching at the University of Groningen, before moving to Frome in 1989 and teaching creative writing at the Bath College of Higher Education. This later became Bath Spa University and he was the first director of its MA in Creative Writing. Jeremy Hooker spent the academic year 1994/5 teaching at Le Moyne College in upstate New York. More recently he was a professor at the University of Glamorgan, from where he retired in 2008, becoming Emeritus Professor of the University.

Hooker remained active, and continued to publish poetry and prose, including contributions to various periodicals, after retiring.

In 2013, Hooker was elected a Fellow of the Learned Society of Wales and in 2021 Fellow of the Royal Society of Literature.

=== Works ===
A concern with place and landscape, in relation to personal identity, is central to both Hooker's poetry and to his critical writing, as is "the relation between poetry and the sacred".

He published eleven full length collections of poetry (including selected and collected works), critical studies of John Cowper Powys and David Jones, as well as collections of literary essays. He also edited works by Richard Jefferies, Edward Thomas, Frances Bellerby, Wilfred Owen, and Alun Lewis (poet). In addition, Hooker was involved with works for radio, including "A Map of David Jones".

When asked, in an interview, about influences Hooker listed Richard Jeffries, Thomas Hardy, Edward Thomas and later David Jones, along with the American Objectivist poets William Carlos Williams and George Oppen. Hooker began reading Jefferies when he was twelve. Another important early influence was that Hooker's father was a landscape painter, who had a great love of Constable.

The move to Wales in 1965 was important for Hooker's development both as poet and as critic, and during the 1970s he established himself as an important critic of Welsh writing in English and was involved with teaching a course in this literature, which had been created by Ned Thomas at Aberytwyth.

But the tension of being a "foreigner" in Wales led to Hooker selling the house in Llangwyryfon, in 1980: "I owe no place more than Llangwyryfon, but it has taken eleven years of living there, in an agricultural and predominantly Welsh-speaking community, for us to realise that our particular kind of dislocation can't be mended by settling permanently where other people belong". While living there he published three books of poetry that deal with his earlier experience of life in Southern England: Soliloquies of a Chalk Giant (1974) (winner in 1974 of the Welsh Arts Council Literature Prize), Landscape of the Daylight Moon (1978), Solent Shore (1978), and a fourth collection that focussed more on his experience of living in Wales: Englishman's Road (1980).

== Bibliography ==
=== Poems ===
- Poetry Introduction, number 1. With John Cotton; John Daniel; Douglas Dunn; Elaine Feinstein; Ian Hamilton; David Harsent; V.C Horwell; Bartholomew Quinn. London: Faber & Faber, 1969.
- The Elements (Triskel Poets) (pamphlet). Davies 1972.
- Soliloquies of a Chalk Giant. London: Enitharmon, 1974.
- Landscape of the Daylight Moon. London: Enitharmon, 1978.
- Solent Shore. Manchester: Carcanet, 1978.
- Englishman's Road. Manchester: Carcanet, 1980.
- A view from the Source: Selected Poems. Manchester: Carcanet, 1982.
- Itchen Water. (pamphlet) Winchester: Winchester School of Art Press, 1982.
- Their Silence a Language (with the artist Lee Grandjean). Ipswich: Ipswich Borough Council, 1990.
- Master of the Leaping Figures. Petersfield, Hampshire: Enitharmon, 1987.
- Groundwork with Lee Grandjean (Illustrator) Nottingham: Djanogly Art Gallery, 1998.
- Adamah. London: Enitharmon, 2002
- Our Lady of Europe. London: Enitharmon, 1997.
- Arnolds Wood. Birmingham: Flarestack, 2005
- The Cut of the Light. Poems 1965–2005. London: Enitharmon, 2006.
- Scattered Light. London: Enitharmon, 2015

=== Literary studies and essays ===
- John Cowper Powys. Cardiff: University of Wales Press (for the Welsh Arts Council) 1973.
- David Jones : An Exploratory Study of the Writings. London: Enitharmon, 1975.
- John Cowper Powys and David Jones: A Comparative Study. London: Enitharmon, 1979.
- Poetry of Place : Essays and Reviews 1970–1981. London: Carcanet, 1982.
- The presence of the past : Essays on Modern British and American Poetry. Bridgend, Wales: Poetry Wales Press, c1987.
- Imagining Wales : A View of Modern Welsh Writing in English. Cardiff: University of Wales Press, 2001.
- Welsh Journal. Bridgend, Wales: Seren, 2001.
- Upstate: A North American Journal. Exeter, Devon: Shearsman Books, 2007.
- Openings: A European Journal. Exeter, Devon: Shearsman Books, 2014
- Ditch Vision: Essays on Poetry, Nature, and Place. Stroud: Awen, 2017.

=== Works edited by ===
- Alun Lewis, Selected Poems. Selected by Jeremy Hooker and Gweno Lewis; foreword by Robert Graves; afterword by Jeremy Hooker. London: Unwin, 1981.
- Frances Bellerby, Selected Stories. Edited and introduced by Jeremy Hooker, London: Enitharmon 1997.
- Alun Lewis Inwards Where All the Battle is: A Selection of Alun Lewis's Writings from India. Jeremy Hooker, ed., David Gentleman, Illustrations. Newtown: Gwasg Gregynog, 1997.
- Jefferies, Richard, At Home on the Earth: A New Selection of the Later Writings of Richard Jeffries. Selected and introduced by Jeremy Hooker; with illustrations by Agnes Miller Parker. Totnes, Devon: Green Books, 2001.
- Edward Thomas, The Ship of Swallows : A Selection of Short Stories, edited and introduced by Jeremy Hooker; Preface by Myfanwy Thomas. London: Enitharmon, 2005.
- Richard Jefferies. The Story of My Heart: My Autobiography. Introduction by Jeremy Hooker.
- Wilfred Owen, Mapping Golgotha : Letters & Poems. Selected, edited, and with an introduction by Jeremy Hooker; illustrated by Harry Brockway. Newtown, Powys: Gwasg Gregynog, 2007.

=== Essays in collections ===
- The Experience of Landscape, Paintings, Drawings and Photographs from The Arts council Collection (exhibition catalogue) London: South Bank Centre, 1987.
- Art of Edward Thomas. Jonathan Barker, ed.. Wales: Poetry Wales Press, 1987.
- Poetry in the British Isles: Non-Metropolitan Perspectives edited by Hans Werner Ludwig and Lothar Fietz. Cardiff: University of Wales Press, 1995.
- Word Play Place : Essays on the Poetry of John Matthias, ed. Robert Thomas Archambeau. Athens, USA: Swallow Press, 1998.

=== Miscellaneous ===
- David T. Lloyd. "Interview", Writing on the Edge: Interviews with Writers and Editors of Wales. Amersterdam and Atlanta: Rodopi, 1997.
- Christopher Meredith, ed. Moment of Earth: Poems and Essays in Honour of Jeremy Hooker. Aberystwyth: Celtic Studies, 2007.
