= Wing (poetry collection) =

Poetry collection by Matthew Francis

- Author: Matthew Francis
- Language: English
- Genre: Poetry Collection
- Publisher: Faber & Faber
- Publication date: February 6, 2020
- Media type: Book
- Pages: 80
- ISBN: 9780571358625

Wing is a 2020 poetry collection written by Matthew Francis. It is Francis' seventh poetry collection and eleventh book. It received positive reviews in The London Magazine and The Guardian.

== Contents ==
Wing is a collection of 36 poems, divided into three sections, each containing twelve poems. Every section follows a different general theme.

=== Freefall ===
Freefall is a series of semi-autobiographical poems focusing on nature and the natural world.

- Longhouse Autumn
- Mere
- Waterbear
- Frog, Crow
- Sandwich Tern
- Ladybird Summer
- A Charm for Earwigs
- Typewriter
- Clock
- Monomoon
- A Dream of Cornwall
- Freefall

=== Micrographia ===
Micrographia is a series of poems inspired by the scientific experiments of Robert Hooke (1665)

- The Microscope
- Ice, Snow
- Sand, Gravel
- Fishscale, Feather
- Moss, Mould
- Nettle, Bee-Sting
- Wings of a Fly
- Silverfish, Moth
- Ant
- Flea, Louse
- Mealybug Nymphs, Gossamer
- Creature

=== Canticles ===
Canticles is a series of poems focusing on language and its uses.

- Yellow
- Wingscape
- Rose Absolute
- Elixirs
- Liberty Caps
- Wassail
- Pomona
- Devil among the Tailors
- Collective
- South and West
- Sea Canticle
- King of a Rainy Country

== Notable poems ==
"Freefall" was written as a eulogy to Francis's friend who died in a parachute accident. Francis remembers moments from their friendship and imagines his friend at peace as he dies. Francis said of the poem "It is a meditation on falling, flying and vertigo".

Wing contains three tributes to other poets, "Frog, Crow" is an adaptation of two famous haiku by the Japanese poet Matsuo Bashō, "Clock" is an adaption of a famous Dafydd ap Gwilym poem and "A Dream of Cornwall" was written as an elegy for the Scottish poet W.S Graham. Graham has been an inspiration for Francis for a long time. Francis' first published work was a collection of W.S Graham poems in 2004. He also authored a study on the life of W.S Graham in the same year.

"Mere" is dedicated to the poet John Barnie, the title comes from an Old English word for pond.

"Monomoon" is a poem written only using words that contain the letter O.

== Reception ==
Wing was named The Guardian's book of the month upon release. It received overall positive reviews in various literary publications and was praised by fellow poet Sheenagh Pugh. Sophie Baggott writing for the Wales Art Review criticised Wing for its near total lack of female characters, all the poets Francis mentions or references are male and there is only one brief mention of a woman in the whole text.
