= Greg Hill (poet) =

Greg Hill edited The Anglo-Welsh Review, taking over as reviews editor in 1980 and becoming the main editor in 1985 until the journal's demise in 1988. He has been involved in a number of other literary projects in Wales, including the journal Materion Dwyieithog/Bilingual Matters, published annually between 1989 and 1992, the results of work done with students at Coleg Ceredigion where he was Head of Humanities.

He contributed to the New Oxford Companion to the Literatures of Wales and has published poetry and criticism in Welsh literary journals such as Planet, New Welsh Review, Poetry Wales and Scintilla.

His publications include:

- Llewelyn Wyn Griffith
- A Oes Golau yn y Gwyll? [Chapter in] ″Diffinio Dwy Lenyddiaeth″, ed M. Wynn Thomas Gwasg Prifysgol Cymru (1995)
- Gillian Clarke as Editor [Chapter in] ″Trying The Line″
- John Barnie: Biography and Autobiography [chapter in] "Wired to the Dynamo" ed Matthew Jarvis Cinnamon Press (2018)
- Jean Earle, a naive talent? originally published in Horizon Online (now defunct) and archived at
- Bastard Englyns Nant Press (2000)
- Creatures Nant Press (2014)
