= Imogen Rhia Herrad =

German historian, translator, writer and broadcaster

- Born: 1967 (age 58–59); Germany
- Education: University of Bonn (B.A., PhD candidate)
- Occupations: Historian, writer, translator, broadcaster, academic
- Known for: Historical writing, short stories, broadcasting, translation
- Notable work: Beyond the Pampas: in Search of Patagonia (2012); Caratacus' Daughter; The Rewards of Dependency and the Cost of Revolt: Sparta and the Perioikic Poleis (2024)
- Awards: Gender Studies Prize, University of Bonn (2014)

Imogen Rhia Herrad is a German historian, translator, writer, and broadcaster. She was born in 1967 and grew up in Germany. She has also lived in Wales, London and in Argentina. She has learnt Welsh and writes in both German and English.

Her short stories and articles in English have been published in magazines and anthologies in Wales, Canada and the US. Her programmes for German public radio (in German) include pieces about the 1915 International Congress of Women, the Antichrist, Zora Neale Hurston, the Mapuche people of Patagonia, and the cultural histories of sheep, dragons and the apple, respectively.

Herrad’s story The Accident has been longlisted for the Raymond Carver Short Story Awards. Her children’s story The Wind’s Bride won third prize in the London Writers’ Competition. Her novel 'Caratacus' Daughter', set in first-century Iron Age Britain and Ancient Rome, received a grant from Academi, the Welsh literature promotion agency.

Her travel narrative "Beyond the Pampas: in Search of Patagonia" was published in November 2012.

Her B.A. dissertation about gender deviance in ancient Ancient Rome, "Quis satis vir est?" ("Who is man enough?") won the 2014 Gender Studies Prize of the University of Bonn.

Herrad works as translator and language editor at the Bonn Center for Dependency and Slavery Studies, and has published about the politics inherent in language editing. She is engaged on a PhD thesis about officer disobedience in ancient Sparta, and recently published a short monograph about attempted revolts in the classical Spartan state, titled "The Rewards of Dependency and the Cost of Revolt: Sparta and the Perioikic Poleis". She teaches ancient history at the University of Bonn.

== Works ==
- Harrad, Imogen (2025). "Language, Power and (In)Visibility. Reflections on Decolonizing Academic English". In Ginés-Blasi, Mònica (ed.). Intentional Invisibilization in Modern Asian History: Concealing and Self-Concealed Agents. pp. 143–158. doi:10.1515/9783111381831-007. ISBN 978-3-11-138183-1.
- Herrad, Imogen (2024). Albrecht, Janico; Bischoff, Jeannine; Dusend, Sarah (eds.). The Rewards of Dependency and the Cost of Revolt: Sparta and the Perioikic Poleis. Joseph C. Miller Memorial Lecture Series. Vol. 23. doi:10.53179/9783868934786. ISBN 978-3-86893-478-6.
- Gilhaus, Lennart; Harrad, Imogen; Meurer, Michael; Pfeiffer, Anja, eds. (2020). Transgression und Devianz in der antiken Welt. Schriften zur Alten Geschichte (in German). Stuttgart: J.B. Metzler. ISBN 9783476055071.
- Harrad, Imogen Rhia (2012). Beyond the Pampas: in Search of Patagonia. Seren Books. ISBN 9781854115911. Archived from the original on 26 March 2023.
- Harrad, Imogen (2010). "Rhiannon's Bird". In Davies, Gwen (ed.). Sing Sorrow Sorrow. Seren Books. ISBN 9781854115300.
- Harrad, Imogen (2009). "Without a Trace". Written in Blood. Honno. Archived from the original on 1 February 2018.
- Harrad, Imogen (2007). The Woman who loved an Octopus and other Saints' Tales. Seren Books. ISBN 9781854114426. Archived from the original on 1 February 2018.
- Harrad, Imogen (2008). "Hortus Conclusus". Coming up Roses. Honno. Archived from the original on 1 February 2018.
- Harrad, Imogen (2007). "The Accident". In Thomas, Janet; Dunker, Patricia (eds.). Safe World Gone. Honno. Archived from the original on 1 February 2018.
- Harrad, Imogen (2004). "Ym Mhatagonia" [In Patagonia]. In Roberts, Gwyneth Tyson (ed.). Even the Rain is Different. Honno. Archived from the original on 1 February 2018. – excerpt
- Harrad, Imogen (2002). "Bronwerdd". In Duncker, Patricia; Thomas, Janet (eds.). The Woman who loved Cucumbers. Dinas Powys: Honno. ISBN 9781870206495. OCLC 59452972.
