= Christopher Meredith =

British writer (born 1954)

- Born: 1954 (age 71–72); Tredegar, Wales
- Occupation: Writer
- Writing career
- Language: English, Welsh
- Genres: Fiction. poetry, translation
- Notable works: Shifts, The Book of Idiots, The Meaning of Flight
- Website: christophermeredit9.wixsite.com/website

Christopher Meredith FLSW (born 1954) is a poet, novelist, short story writer, and translator from Tredegar, Wales.

== Biography ==
Meredith was born in Tredegar, Wales. His father, Emrys, from Tredegar, was a steelworker and former collier who had also served as a Royal Marine Commando during WW2. His mother Joyce (née Roberts), from Troedrhiwgwair, was a former maid and factory worker and later a home help. He has two brothers, Andrew and Gary. The latter is an actor and was for many years artistic director of Gwent Theatre. Christopher Meredith was educated at Tredegar Comprehensive school and studied philosophy and English at Aberystwyth University where he was taught by Jeremy Hooker and Ned Thomas. After a spell of unemployment and working as a steelworks labourer and later a machine cleaner, he trained as a teacher at Swansea University.

He taught English at the comprehensive school in Brecon from the end of the 70s to the early 90s, during which time he began publishing poetry, articles, fiction and reviews in English. In 1993 he became a lecturer in creative writing at the then University of Glamorgan. This became the University of South Wales and he went on to become a professor of creative writing, running the subject in later years. This subject, established in the university by the poet Tony Curtis with Rob Middlehurst, included among its teachers Sheenagh Pugh, Catherine Merriman, Matthew Francis, Philip Gross, Desmond Barry, Helen Dunmore, Gillian Clarke and others. He left higher education in 2013 and is now an emeritus professor.

He has two sons and lives with his wife in Brecon.

== Writing ==
Meredith began publishing poems, articles and review while he was a schoolteacher. His first two novels and two collections of poetry were published in this period. His first collection of poems, This (1984) won an Eric Gregory Award while still in manuscript. His first novel, Shifts (1988), is set in the late 1970s against the decline of heavy industry in south Wales and has been called 'the classic account' of the post-industrial experience (by Stephen Knight in One Hundred Years of Fiction), a Welsh novel, a British working class novel, a modernist novel, and 'a poetic novel of ideas'. It won international attention and has never been out of print. After a second book of poems, Snaring Heaven (1990), his second novel, Griffri (1991) appeared. Utterly different from the first, this is set in the 12th century, with a poet narrator, the Griffri of the title, and deals vividly and intensely with the bloody history of the period. Five novels and one collection of short stories have appeared so far, and four full-length poetry collections as well as other shorter volumes. The body of his work in poetry and fiction is marked by formal versatility, a wide range of subject matter and milieu, and an underlying coherence of theme and imagination. There is a marked strain of humour, often very black, in some of the fiction.

Magazine contributions have appeared in Agenda, Poetry Wales, New Welsh Review, Poetry London, New Statesman, New England Review/Bread Loaf Quarterly, Independent on Sunday, TLS and others. In the mid-1990s he wrote a column for Planet. There are numerous anthology contributions, including to the Forward Book of Poetry 2014 and Best European Fiction 2015.

He has given readings and talks and taken part in workshops and seminars all over Britain, in Ireland, Brittany, Belgium, Germany, Czech Republic, Finland, Slovenia, Estonia, Israel/Palestine, Egypt and the USA.

Meredith was brought up in a non-Welsh speaking home in a largely linguistically Anglicised part of the country and has had no formal education in Welsh at all. His interest in the language started in his early teens, but he began learning it in earnest with friends and from books while a student. While almost all his writing is in English, Welsh language and literature are a profound presence in his work and life. He has published a short book for children in Welsh, which has since appeared in an English version, and one of his short stories, 'Progress' from Brief Lives (2018), has appeared in his own Welsh version titled 'Cam Ymlaen' in the magazine O'r Pedwar Gwynt. He's produced translations into English from Welsh by other hands, including Mihangel Morgan's novel, Melog (2005) and has translated poetry by other hands into Welsh for the magazine Taliesin. A handful of poems in Welsh is scattered in his collections, accompanied by English versions.

In the 2010s he was commissioned to compose monumental wall inscriptions in Welsh and English for y Gaer, the museum, art gallery and library complex in Brecon, which opened in 2019.

Meredith's critical work includes a major essay on conceptions of writing: 'Miller's Answer: Making, Saying and the Impulse to Write', delivered as a lecture at the Hay Festival in 2010 and published in New Writing: The International Journal for the Practice & Theory of Creative Writing, Vol. 8 No. 1, March 2011; a piece on A.J. Cronin's The Citadel, 'Cronin and the Chronotope: place, time and pessimistic individualism' in The North American Journal for Welsh Studies Studies, Sept. 2013; and several pieces on Dorothy Edwards (1902–34), especially 'Rhapsody's Lost Story', in C. Meredith (ed.) Moment of Earth, Celtic Studies Publications, Aberystwyth, 2007. Meredith was among those who urged the reprint of Edwards's 1927 masterpiece Rhapsody in the Library of Wales series in 2007, for which he wrote the introduction and which he edited, adding three previously uncollected stories by Edwards.

His own work has been the subject of academic discussion, e.g. in K. Bohata's Postcolonialism Revisited, S. Knight's One Hundred Years of Fiction and J. Kirk's The British Working Class in the Twentieth Century, and is the subject of a full-length study, Diana Wallace's Christopher Meredith (UWP 2018).

The balance of poetry and fiction has been maintained in his creative work, with volumes of each appearing more or less alternately over the years. In 2021 his short novel Please was published on the same day as a new collection of poems, Still. Shifts appeared in a new edition with foreword by Diana Wallace in the Library of Wales imprint in 2023.

== Publications ==
=== Fiction ===
- Shifts Seren, 1988, reprinted 1990; in Seren Classics with Afterword by Richard Poole 1997, 2005, 2013, 2017, 2018; Library of Wales edition (Parthian Books) with foreword by Diana Wallace 2023
- Griffri Seren 1991, revised edition, 1994. Published in French translation 2002
- Sidereal Time Seren, 1998
- The Book of Idiots Seren, 2012, 2018
- Brief Lives: six fictions Seren 2018
- Please Seren 2021

=== Poetry ===
- This Poetry Wales Press, 1984
- Snaring Heaven Seren, 1990
- The Meaning of Flight Seren, 2005
- Black Mountains: Poems & Images from the Bog~Mawnog Project Mulfran Press, 2011
- Air Histories Seren, 2013
- Still Seren, 2021

=== For children ===
- Nadolig bob Dydd Illustrated by Chris Glynn. Gomer, 2000, 2005
- Christmas Every Day Illustrated by Chris Glynn. Pont Books, 2006

=== As editor ===
- Re-imagining Wales (co-edited with Tony Curtis; a special number of the Literary Review) Fairleigh Dickinson University USA, 2001
- Five essays on translation (co-edited with Katja Krebs) University of Glamorgan 2005
- Moment of Earth Celtic Studies Publications, 2007

=== Translation from Welsh ===
- Melog a novel by Mihangel Morgan, Seren, 2005

=== Limited editions ===
- Cefn Golau: Shooting a Novelist Essay (with a linocut by Sara Philpott) Gregynog, 1996
- The Story of the Afanc King & the Sons of Teyrnon Short story (with etched linocuts by Sara Philpott) Gregynog, 2006
- Still Air an edition of 50 handmade copies. Nine poems by Christopher Meredith and six linocuts printed from the original blocks by Sara Philpott. Singing Nettle Press, 2016

== Prizes, fellowships ==
- Eric Gregory Award (1983)
- Arts Council of Wales Young Writer Prize (1985) for This
- Arts Council of Wales Fiction Prize (1989) for Shifts
- Shortlist Wales Book of the Year (1992) for Griffri
- Longlist Wales Book of the Year (2006) for The Meaning of Flight
- Shifts shortlisted for title of 'Greatest Welsh Novel of All Time' by Wales Arts Review in 2014. Polled in second place after Caradog Prichard's Un Nos Ola Leuad
- Halma Scholarship, 2012–13, with writer's residencies in Finland and Slovenia
- Elected Fellow of the Learned Society of Wales, 2017
- Hawthornden Fellowship, Feb – March 2020
