= The Anglo-Welsh Review =

Welsh literary periodical 1949–1988

The Anglo-Welsh Review was a literary and cultural magazine published in Wales between 1949 and 1988.

Its original title was ″Dock Leaves″, a reference to the fact that it was published in Pembroke Dock, the town in which its founding editor Raymond Garlick lived and taught in the local school. He published an account of the early years of the magazine in 1971. The name was changed in 1957 to reflect the editor's work in defining a tradition of writing known as ‘Anglo-Welsh Literature’, prefigured in an editorial to the magazine in 1952 expressing the hope that “someone will persuade a publishing house to put forth a badly needed anthology of Anglo-Welsh poetry”. Garlick, together with fellow founder of the magazine Roland Mathias, eventually published such an anthology. The name change also placed the magazine in a tradition with ″The Welsh Review″ (1939–1948).

Roland Mathias took over the editorship in 1960 by which time, financially supported by the Welsh Arts Council, it had become more substantial both in terms of the number of pages and the breadth of its coverage of Welsh cultural life. The magazine was subsequently edited by Gillian Clarke who joined Roland Mathias as Reviews Editor in 1973 and became its editor in 1976. Greg Hill joined her as Reviews Editor in 1980 and himself became editor in 1985.

The growth of the book review section indicates an attempt to provide a coverage of all aspects of Welsh life but also enabled a series of reviews editors to take on a substantial editorial role and gradually move to co-editing before taking over as main editors. This process is well documented in memoirs by Gillian Clarke, Roland Mathias and Greg Hill.

The magazine had been printed and was eventually published by Five Arches Press. It ceased publication in 1988 following a review of franchise arrangements linking Welsh Arts Council funded publications with printers. Following this review the publication grant was awarded to a consortium including The Welsh Academy for a magazine which has since been published as New Welsh Review.
