= Jack Jones (novelist) =

Welsh miner, Trade Union official, politician and playwright (1884–1970)

- Jones in 1951
- Born: 24 November 1884; Merthyr Tydfil, Wales, UK
- Died: 7 May 1970 (aged 85)
- Occupations: Miner, trade union official, politician, playwright, novelist, actor

Jack Jones (24 November 1884 – 7 May 1970) was a Welsh miner, Trade Union official, politician, novelist and playwright.

== Background ==
Jack Jones was born in 1884 at Tai-Harri-Blawdd in Merthyr Tydfil, the eldest of nine surviving children of David Jones, a coal miner, and his wife Sarah Ann. He was educated at St David’s Elementary School, Merthyr Tydfil, Glamorgan. He married Laura Grimes Evans in 1908. They had four sons (two died young) and one daughter.

== Career ==
In 1896 he joined his father to work in the mines aged 12. In 1901 at the age of 17 he joined the army and was posted to South Africa with his regiment the Militia Battalion of the Welch. However he was very unhappy there and ended up deserting. Once recaptured, he was transferred to India. When he eventually returned to Wales he went back to working in the coal mines. In 1914 Jones was summoned back to his regiment and sent to the front lines in France and later on Belgium. After suffering shrapnel wounds he was invalided home and appointed as recruiting officer for Merthyr Tydfil. He became honorary secretary of his local miners' lodge. In 1923 he was appointed as the full-time secretary-representative of the miners at Blaengarw. In 1926 during the General Strike as part of his job as a miners' agent, he travelled around South Wales urging miners to continue supporting the strike. In 1927 he resigned from his full-time post with the miners' union. In early 1928 he was employed by Liberal Party headquarters as a speaker. He continued in this job until 1930. By 1934 he had started to earn a living as a writer. He went on two lecture tours in America and the European battlefronts during the Second World War (1939-1945).

== Politics ==
In 1920 Jones became a member of the Communist Party. He attended a convention in Manchester on behalf of his local miners lodge with the purpose of establishing the party; at this meeting he was chosen to be Corresponding Secretary for the South Wales Region. He later founded a branch at Merthyr Tydfil. In 1923 he left the Communist Party and joined the Labour Party. He undertook a number of speaking engagements for the party including speaking in support of Labour leader Ramsay MacDonald at Aberavon. In 1927 he produced his first article for the press entitled "The Need for a Lib-Lab Coalition". He was becoming disenchanted with the Labour party and its support for nationalisation. He was drawn to support the Liberal Party through its new policies on coal and power. and had joined by the beginning of 1928. Liberal leader David Lloyd George who had been impressed by his rhetoric, recruited him to the Liberal headquarters speaking staff. He travelled around Britain speaking in support of the Liberal party's new industrial policies. In May 1928 he was selected by Neath Liberal Association to be their prospective parliamentary candidate. Neath was a safe Labour seat that the Liberals last won in 1918; at the last election in 1924 the Liberals had not run a candidate. He stood as Liberal candidate for Neath at the 1929 General Election and polled nearly 30%;

General Election 1929: Neath Electorate 59,584
Party	Candidate	Votes	%	±%
Labour	William Jenkins	29,455	60.2	n/a
Liberal	Jack Jones	14,554	29.8	n/a
Unionist	David J Evans	4,892	10.0	n/a
Majority		14,901	30.4	n/a
Turnout			82.1	n/a
Labour hold		Swing	n/a	

He did not stand for parliament again. He was retained by Liberal headquarters as a speaker for another 12 months after the election. During the 1930s he made another political change and was a speaker for Oswald Mosley's New Party. In the 1945 election he supported 'National' candidate Sir James Grigg.

== Writing career ==
During his 20s Jack Jones began to educate himself and develop his love of the theatre and writing, often taking part in local dramatic productions. In 1926 he successfully entered a short play he had written entitled Dad's Double into a competition in Manchester. He began writing seriously during a period of unemployment. His first novel, Saran, was never published, but a reduced version of it appeared as Black Parade (1935). By 1939, he had written the novels Rhondda Roundabout (1934), and Bidden to the Feast (1938), a play, Land of my Fathers (1937), and his first autobiography, Unfinished Journey (1937). The London stage version of Rhondda Roundabout was acclaimed. He wrote the dialogue for the film The Proud Valley, in which he also had a minor acting role. During the Second World War he was a speaker for the Ministry of Information and the National Savings Movement. He wrote The Man David (1944), a life of David Lloyd George.

After the war he wrote two volumes of autobiography, Me and Mine (1946) and Give Me Back My Heart (1950), three novels, Off to Philadelphia in the Morning (1947) made into a BBC drama of the same name in 1978, Some Trust in Chariots (1948), and River Out of Eden (1951), and a play Transatlantic Episode (1947). His later works, Lily of the Valley and Lucky Year (1952), Time and the Business (1953), Choral Symphony (1955) and Come, Night; End, Day (1956) were less well received. In 1954, he married his second wife, Gladys Morgan. He was elected first President of the English section of Yr Academi Gymreig. Until his death in May 1970 he continued writing; these works remained unpublished, including a biographical novel, A Burnt Offering, based on the life of Dr William Price (1800–1893), Llantrisant, pioneer of cremation.

== Honours ==
In 1948 he was made a Commander of the Order of the British Empire for his services to the community and to literature. In February 1970 he won an award from the Arts Council of Wales for 'his distinguished contribution to the literature of Wales'. Jack Jones died on 7 May 1970.

== Writings ==
- Film
  - The Proud Valley (1940)
- Plays
  - Land of my Fathers (1937)
  - Rhondda Roundabout (1934)
  - Transatlantic Episode (1947)
- Books
  - Saran (unpublished)
  - Rhondda Roundabout (1934)
  - Black Parade (1935)
  - Unfinished Journey (autobiography) (1937)
  - Bidden to the Feast (1938)
  - The Man David (1944)
  - Me and Mine: Further Chapters in the Autobiography of Jack Jones (1946)
  - Give Me Back My Heart (1950)
  - Off to Philadelphia in the Morning (1947)
  - Some Trust in Chariots (1948)
  - River out of Eden (1951)
  - Lily of the Valley (1952)
  - Lucky Year (1952)
  - Time and the Business (1953)
  - Choral Symphony (1955)
  - Come, Night; End, Day (1956)
  - A Burnt Offering (unpublished)
