= Bidden to the Feast =

1938 novel by Jack Jones

Bidden to the Feast (1938) is a novel of historic fiction by the Welsh writer Jack Jones. It was published by Hamish Hamilton in the UK and by G. P. Putnam's Sons in the US.

Much of the detail of the novel, especially that pertaining to coal mining, is drawn from the author's experiences.

== Background ==
The story tells of the Davies family who live in Merthyr Tydfil, the ‘iron capital’ of Wales, commencing in the 1850s. The Merthyr Rising of 1831 is still fresh in the memories of many of the inhabitants. Despite the coming of the union movement and the election of members of parliament, Merthyr is still effectively ruled by the iron masters and coal owners.

== Summary ==
Ann Davies, prematurely aged matriarch of the large Davies family, is devastated when her hardworking, hard drinking coal miner husband Rhys drags her youngest, Little Joe, down the coal mine at the age of eight to start work as a door boy. Joe is the first of the family to have any schooling and can already read a bit. His two sisters Megan and Moriah are already working in the brickyard; they get their entertainment by singing, most of the ‘gels’ in the brickyard are good singers.

Rhys angrily storms home when he learns that the girls have won a marble clock in a public singing competition – singing is only for chapel. He smashes the clock and prepares to give the girls a beating. Ann hysterically raises the breadknife to defend them, but collapses with a massive stroke.

Ann does not recover, and Rhys, racked with guilt, is now a changed man, gentler in his ways and eschewing his visits to the public house. Megan has to leave the brickyard to run the household. She is courted by the flamboyant and prosperous Shon Howell, the ‘Cheap Jack’, who is disliked by the town's tradesmen as he undercuts them, but admired by many for the entertainment he provides. But it is Moriah who eventually runs away with him to Aberdare, and then to England to marry him. He pays for her to have voice training and lessons in Italian.

Ann eventually dies on the same day as her rich and elderly aunt, ‘Bopa’ Lloyd. The girls inherit five thousand pounds between them, whilst the aunt's carer, Marged Ellis, inherits her house and extensive rental properties. Megan takes Joe, now fourteen years old, out of the mine to be educated.

Moriah is accepted on a scholarship to the Royal Academy of Music in London. Megan also studies tonic sol-fa, and in 1873 visits London as part of the Cor Mawr (Great Choir), the South Wales Choral Union, which wins the national competition at Crystal Palace.

Strikes in the coal mines see women reduced to begging Megan for financial assistance; her inheritance begins to dwindle, but she cannot refuse them. Two of her brothers decide to emigrate to America with money lent by Megan. Joe is now working as an assistant in an auctioneer's office and doing well. Will, the other brother who lives next door, is full of enthusiasm with the nascent union movement and is now working in the mine as a haulier – a considerable rise in status. Moriah is singing with the Carl Rosa Opera Company and travels to Italy, where she adopts the professional name of Madam Moriana.

Rhys is killed when the Gethin mine floods and he attempts to rescue a fellow worker.

Joe has an opportunity to buy into a business partnership in Cardiff. He asks Megan for the money, which she gives him, knowing that she will now see Joe less and less. Alone in the family house, she asks Sophie, the former ‘Mother of the yard’ under whom she worked in the brickyard, to come and share her house.

The National Eisteddfod of Wales visits Merthyr in 1881 and Megan takes part in the choral singing. Dr Joseph Parry, a native of Merthyr, arrives to see his music performed. Moriah also visits with some professional colleagues, but declines to perform at a ‘mere’ Eisteddford.

Marged Ellis dies and leaves Megan her entire estate. Joe has repaid Megan's loan, and comes up from Cardiff to handle her properties. He persuades her to leave the small rented cottage in ‘the Row’ and restore Marged's large house, so that the brothers in America will have a place to stay when they visit. They arrive to an emotional welcome.

Megan and a family party travel to Cardiff to see Moriah perform with members of her company. Her voice is glorious, but the sisters have now grown apart.

Joe becomes a partner in a steamship company with a loan from Megan; he hopes to join the ‘merchant princes’ of Cardiff, making big money out of coal and steel export. He repays the loan with interest, but Megan is upset when Joe announces that he's going to leave chapel and join the Church of England to please his future wife. After strong words, Megan becomes estranged from Joe, but Shon Howell manages to reconcile them in time for Joe's wedding in Cardiff. Megan finds her new in-laws to be down-to-earth ‘tidy’ folk, despite their wealth, and grows to like them. She later stands as godmother for Edith and Joe's baby son.

Moriah returns to Wales extremely ill, and dies soon afterwards.

Megan travels to America, with emotional visits to her brothers and their now-large families. She is persuaded to stay long enough for the World's Fair in Chicago, but is happy to return to Merthyr where she feels at home.

Shon Howell is affluent enough to have retired to a fine house near Megan's. He suggests that they should marry, but Megan declines the proposal.

== Quotes ==
“Out of the way, woman”

No, not for you to use the buckle-end on my gels, Rhys Davies. All my boys you drove out with that, Rhys Davies, but you san’t drive my gels out with....”

“No, Shon bach, we can’t get married, but I’ll look to you as long as you’ll be. We’ll see each other every day, God willing, and on Sundays, we’ll go together to Zoar. Won’t we?”

“Ay, as well go there as anywhere”, said Shon.

“Better there than anywhere”, said Megan
