= Mab Jones =

Poet and writer

Mab Jones is a poet, writer, and radio presenter based in Wales. She has two poetry collections Poor Queen (Burning Eye Books, 2014) and take your experience and peel it (Indigo Dreams, 2015).

She is the founder and editor of Black Rabbit Press. She has also worked as a presenter for BBC Radio 4, especially on programs related to Welsh themes and content.

Jones was the first Resident Poet at the National Botanic Garden of Wales, and was Resident Writer of Cardiff Wetlands. She received a Literature Matters Award from the Royal Society of Literature in 2019 in order to create a podcast about this. Previously, she has created a podcast for London's Apples & Snakes, who she has headlined for at several of their spoken word events.

The poet coordinated International Dylan Thomas Day in 2016 and 2017. In 2018, she volunteered to help Dylan Thomas' granddaughter, Hannah Ellis, in running the day. As part of this, Jones organised a worldwide competition to create the world's longest love poem from collated entries, which was successful.

== Awards and honours ==
She has won a number of awards, including the John Tripp Spoken Poetry Audience Prize, the Aurora Poetry Competition, the Geoff Stevens Memorial Poetry Prize, and the Rabbit Heart Poetry Film Festival Grand Jury Prize. She has also received a Creative Wales Award.
