= John Tripp (poet) =

Anglo-Welsh writer

John Tripp (22 July 1927 – 16 February 1986) was an Anglo-Welsh poet and short-story writer.

Born in Bargoed, Wales, he worked for the BBC as a journalist with the BBC, and later became a civil servant. He edited the literary magazine, Planet, and was a popular performance poet. The John Tripp Spoken Poetry Award was founded to commemorate him.

== Works ==
- The Province of Belief
- The Inheritance File
- Collected Poems (1978)
