= Angel Mountain Saga =

Eight-novel series by Brian John

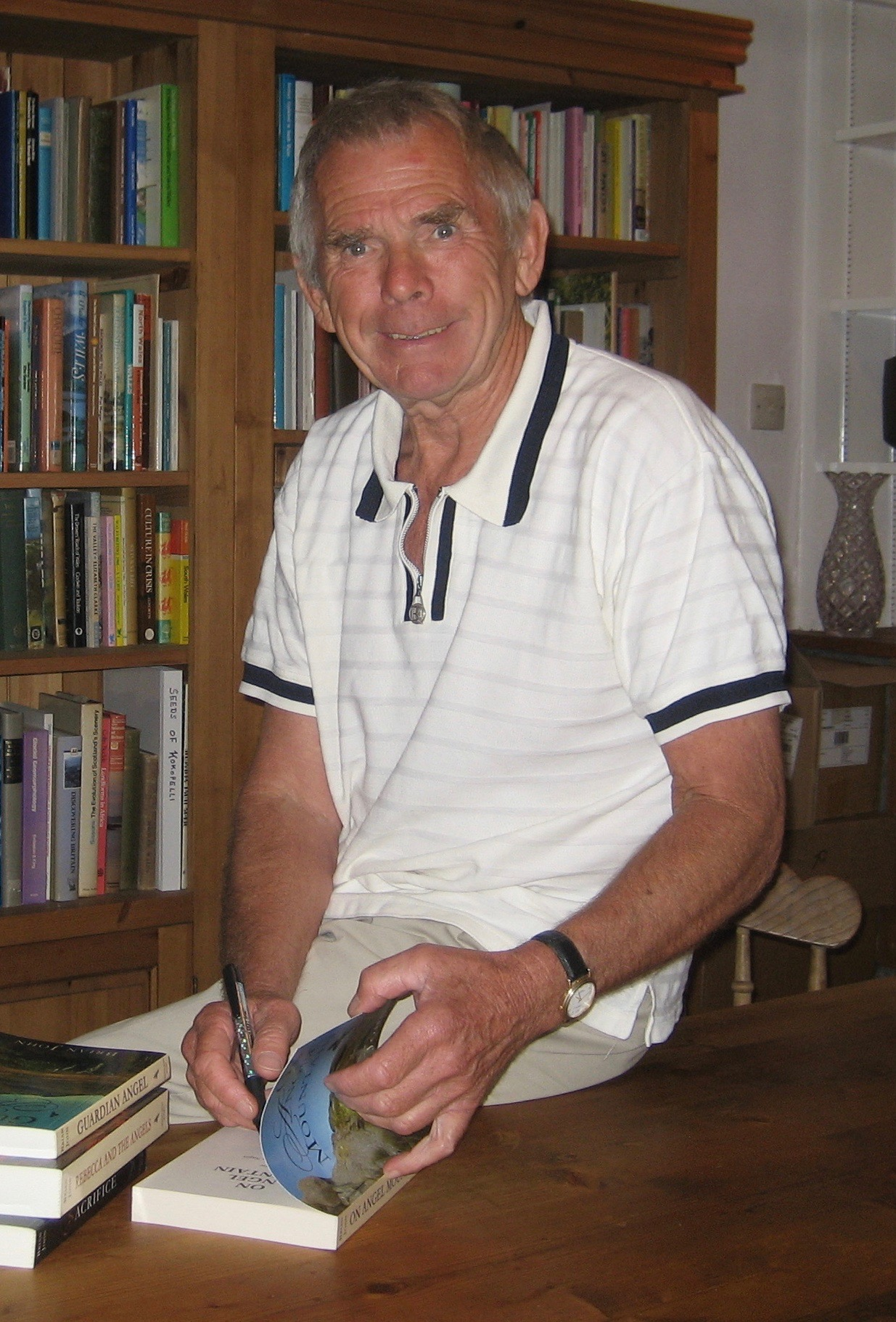
Author Brian John at book signing session

The Angel Mountain Saga of eight novels was written by Welsh author Brian John, and was first published at the rate of one volume per year in 2001–2005, with later volumes in 2007, 2009 and 2012. The publisher is Greencroft Books, based in Newport, Pembrokeshire. The novels tell of the life and times of Mistress Martha Morgan, a feisty heroine who starts the series in 1796 as a pregnant and suicidal eighteen-year-old and finishes it by going to her grave in 1855. In the sixth novel she is resurrected (or is she?) and has further adventures in Merthyr Tydfil and further afield. Volumes seven and eight are placed into gaps in the narrative related in Volume Three. The eight novels are "On Angel Mountain" (2001), "House of Angels" (2002), "Dark Angel" (2003), "Rebecca and the Angels" (2004), "Flying with Angels" (2005), "Guardian Angel" (2007), "Sacrifice" (2009) and "Conspiracy of Angels" (2012).

The novels have a cult following and have now sold over 80,000 copies excluding Ebook sales — a substantial total for a small regional publisher. Within two years of publication, "On Angel Mountain" was reprinted three times, and was then bought by Corgi, whose edition first appeared in March 2006. Corgi also published the second and third books in the series, but their sales were disappointing to the author, and the rights have now reverted to Greencroft Books, with several subsequent reprints.

The novels are all set in the rough landscape around the mountain of Carningli in North Pembrokeshire, which is now the scene of "literary tourism" as fans of the series visit "Martha Morgan Country." In the marketing of these novels, as with other regional novels down through the years, the "sense of place" of the stories has been emphasised in book cover design and in the book marketing strategy.

In reviews Mistress Martha is referred to as "Mother Wales" in view of her complex and imperfect character, inviting comparisons with Chris Guthrie, the heroine and "Mother Scotland" who features in Grassic Gibbons' famous trilogy of novels called "A Scots Quair."

The cover of the latest printed edition of Volume One in the series
