= Rhondda Roundabout =

- Author: Jack Jones
- Language: English
- Publication date: 1934

Rhondda Roundabout (1934) was the first published novel by the Welsh writer Jack Jones.

== Plot ==
The story is set in the Rhondda Valley in the early 1930s. It chronicles the trials and tribulations of the peoples, set against the backdrop of the aftermath of the General Strike and the Great Depression in the South Wales Valleys. It is principally seen through the eyes of a newly ordained chapel minister, the Reverend Dan Price.

The story is peopled with colourful characters who mostly struggle to live their lives during economic troubles. They include Dan's uncle, John 'Shoni' Lloyd, an ex-First World War soldier and confirmed non-chapel goer, Morgan 'Big Mog' Morgan, an ex-miner, ex-soldier and now a successful bookie and philanthropist, David 'Dai Hippo' Daniels, an ex-miner and firebrand Communist activist, and Guy Sprattling, ('the captain') a badly shell-shocked veteran of the war who works for Big Mog until he is eventually able to face the world again.

Dan throws himself into his work at Beulah chapel, which is heavily in debt, and attempts to draw more people into the work of the chapel and improve attendance (and thereby its income). He persuades the fiery 'Llew Rhondda', the chapel's choirmaster known as 'God's Songmaster', to revive the tradition of choral performances at Beulah.

On his visit to Evans the Draper, he meets Lucy Meredith and is smitten with her, eventually courting her, whilst carrying on his full-time work at the chapel, giving lectures, producing amateur dramatics and trying to persuade people to come to chapel instead of attending boxing matches and communist rallies.

The story culminates with a massive explosion in one of the mines that is still working. Shoni, a trained rescue worker, goes down to bring out the trapped miners, with no lives lost, Dan joins an emotional prayer vigil at the pithead.

When he dies, Evans the Draper wills his estate and house to Lucy, so that she and Dan can marry.
