= Leslie Norris =

Welsh( wales born) writer (1921–2006)

George Leslie Norris (21 May 1921 – 6 April 2006), was a prize-winning Welsh poet and short story writer. He taught at academic institutions in Britain and the United States, including Brigham Young University. Norris is considered one of the most important Welsh writers of the post-war period, and his literary publications have won many prizes.

== Early life ==
George Leslie Norris was born on 21 May 1921 in Merthyr Tydfil, South Wales. His parents were George and Mary Jane Norris. Leslie had two younger brothers, Eric and Gordon. His father George worked as a miner, but after First World War became a milkman because of his declining health. Leslie grew up in Wales during the Great Depression. He enjoyed reading books and playing sports as a kid. He attended Georgetown Primary School from 1926 to 1931. He attended Cyfarthfa Castle Grammar School after that. Throughout school, Norris was involved in sports like football and boxing. By age 12, Leslie knew he wanted to be a poet and he went to listen to acclaimed poets like Dylan Thomas and Vernon Watkins. He published his first poem in 1938 at the age of seventeen. That same year, Norris had to drop out of school due to financial pressures. He began working as a rates clerk in the Town Hall in Merthyr.

When he was nineteen years old he joined the Royal Air Force during the Second World War. In May 1940 he trained as a pilot. He got blood poisoning, however, from steel ropes, and was discharged in June 1941. His father died the next year of cancer. Norris returned to his work at the town hall. He became a soccer referee and was part of the Merthyr Referees Society.

Leslie married Catherine (Kitty) Morgan in July 1948, and they remained together the rest of his life. While publicly the couple maintained that they had no children, Norris confided to close friends that they had one child who died in infancy. Kitty was a chemist, and Norris was her second husband. Shortly after their marriage, Leslie was accepted at the City of Coventry Teacher Training College.

== Teaching career ==
After Leslie's graduation, he taught at the Grass Royal School in Yeovil, Somerset. In 1952, he transferred to Southdown Junior School in Bath, Somerset. He later became headmaster of Westergate School in West Sussex. He obtained a master's degree in philosophy from the University of Southampton in 1958. He secured a job as a lecturer in 1958 at Bognor Regis College of Education and later taught at the West Sussex Institute of Higher Learning. There, his wife taught as well until 1966. Leslie was a principal lecturer at the West Sussex Institute from 1956 to 1974.

Leslie became a visiting professor at the University of Washington in 1973. He was so impacted by his experience teaching in America that he returned to England only to resign his principal lectureship at Bognor Regis. Leslie was Residential Poet at Eton in 1977. In 1976, he and his wife visited New England. From 1980–1982 he visited to Seattle, Washington and East Carolina University.

In 1983 Norris was invited to teach for six months at Brigham Young University (BYU) in Provo, Utah, United States. He settled with his wife, Catherine Morgan, and remained there until his death. He was appointed the official Poet-in-Residence at the university. Leslie was made a Professor of Creative Writing. His wife also taught at BYU. Some of his documents, personal materials and letters are in the L. Tom Perry Special Collections at the Harold B. Lee Library at BYU.

== Literary work ==
Norris published his first poem in 1938 and by 1943, he published his first book of poetry. His career as a poet began to take off when his first collection Finding Gold was published in 1967. By 1980 Norris published three volumes in the Phoenix Living Poets. His publication Ransoms had won the Poetry Society's Alice Hunt Bartlett Prize in 1970.

In addition to poems and short stories, Norris published translation, biographies, and reviews. His personal works deal with such themes as his Welsh home, his past, especially the pre-war period, his experiences as a teacher, nature, and the life of the instinct. He is considered a fine technician. In 1989 he published a translation of Sonnets to Orpheus with another professor at BYU.

== Works ==
=== Poetry collections ===
- Tongue of Beauty (1943)
- Poems (1946)
- The Loud Winter (1967)
- Finding Gold (1967)
- Ransoms (1970)
- Mountains, Polecats, Pheasants (1965)
- Merlin & the Snake's Egg (1978)
- Walking the White Fields: Poems 1967-1980 (1980)
- Water Voices (1980)
- Selected Poems (1986)
- Norris's Ark (1988)
- Sequences (1988)
- A Sea in the Desert (1989)
- The Collected Poems (1996)
- Holy Places (1998)
- Water (2004)
- Complete Poems (2008)

=== Short story collections ===
- Sliding (1978)
- The Girl from Cardigan (1988)
- Collected Stories (1996)

=== Short stories ===
| Title | Publication | Collected in |
|---|---|---|
| "Snowdrops" | The Shining Pyramid and Other Stories by Welsh Authors, ed. Adams & Mathias (December 1970) | Sliding |
| "The Waxwings" | The Atlantic (February 1971) | Sliding |
| "The Mallard" | Esquire (February 1971) | Sliding |
| "The Highland Boy" | The Atlantic (June 1971) | Sliding |
| "A Big Night" | Planet (October–November 1971) | Sliding |
| "A Roman Spring" | The Atlantic (February 1972) | Sliding |
| "Percy Colclough and the Religious Girls" | The New Yorker (28 April 1973) | Sliding |
| "A House Divided" | The Atlantic (May 1973) | Sliding |
| "Cocksfoot, Crested Dog's-Tail, Sweet Vernal Grass" | The New Yorker (2 July 1973) | Sliding |
| "Prey" | Audubon (November 1975) | Sliding |
| "Sliding" | The New Yorker (17 November 1975) | Sliding |
| "Three Shots for Charlie Benson" | The Atlantic (September 1976) | Sliding |
| "A Moonlight Gallop" | Sliding (1976) | Sliding |
| "Away Away in China" | Sliding (1976) | Sliding |
| "Shaving" | The Atlantic (April 1977) | The Girl from Cardigan |
| "A Flight of Geese" | The New Yorker (10 October 1977) | The Girl from Cardigan |
| "In the West Country" | The New Yorker (14 November 1977) | The Girl from Cardigan |
| "Lurchers" | The New Yorker (3 July 1978) | The Girl from Cardigan |
| "Sing It Again, Wordsworth" | The Atlantic (August 1979) | The Girl from Cardigan |
| "My Uncle's Story" | The Atlantic (November 1980) | The Girl from Cardigan |
| "Johnny Trevecca and the Devil" | The Sewanee Review (Winter 1980) | The Girl from Cardigan (Seren edition) |
| "The Wind, the Cold Wind" | The Missouri Review (Winter 1981) | The Girl from Cardigan |
| "A Piece of Archangel" | Shenandoah 33.1 (Winter 1981) | The Girl from Cardigan |
| "Gamblers" | Shenandoah 33.3 (1982) | The Girl from Cardigan |
| "The Kingfisher" | The New Yorker (23 July 1984) | The Girl from Cardigan |
| "Blackberries" | BYU Today 39.4 (August 1985) | The Girl from Cardigan |
| "The Holm Oak" | Shenandoah 36.4 (1986) | The Girl from Cardigan |
| "The Girl from Cardigan" | The New Yorker (28 September 1986) | The Girl from Cardigan |
| "Keening" | The Sewanee Review (Fall 1987) | The Girl from Cardigan (Seren edition) |
| "Some Opposites of Good" | New England Review & Bread Loaf Quarterly (Summer 1988) | The Girl from Cardigan |
| "A Professional Man" | The Girl from Cardigan (1988) | The Girl from Cardigan |
| "Reverse for Dennis" | The Girl from Cardigan (1988) | The Girl from Cardigan |
| "All You Who Come to Portland Bill" | The Girl from Cardigan (Seren edition) (1988) | The Girl from Cardigan (Seren edition) |
| "A Seeing Eye" | The Girl from Cardigan (Seren edition) (1988) | The Girl from Cardigan (Seren edition) |
| "The Brighton Midgets" | The Sewanee Review (Spring 1989) | Collected Stories |
| "Fire Fire" | - | Collected Stories |
| "A Sacrifice" | - | Collected Stories |

=== Awards ===
His works have won numerous awards, including the Cholmondeley Poetry Prize, the David Higham Memorial Prize, the Katherine Mansfield Memorial Award, the AML Award for poetry (in 1996), and the Welsh Arts Council Senior Fiction Award. He is also an honorary Doctor of Letters of the University of Glamorgan, and honorary Doctor of Humane Letters of BYU. Leslie is a Fellow of the Royal Society of Literature and of the Welsh Academy.

Leslie died on 6 April 2006 in Provo, Utah, United States.
