= Brian John =

Welsh writer

Dr Brian S. John (born 1940) is a Welsh writer. He is the author of the historical-fiction series Angel Mountain Saga.

Brian John

John was born in Carmarthen, Wales. He studied at Haverfordwest Grammar School and at Jesus College, Oxford, where he read Geography from 1959 to 1962 and went on to obtain a D Phil for a study of the Ice Age in Wales. He worked as a field scientist in Antarctica and spent eleven years as a geography lecturer at Durham University. He has travelled widely in the Arctic, Antarctic and Scandinavia. Since 1977 he has made his living as a writer and publisher. He is the author of The Stonehenge Bluestones and he has made extensive studies of the relationships between megalithic structures and landscape in the Preseli region of Pembrokeshire. He is the author of Part Two of An Historical Atlas of Pembrokeshire (2019).

John is also actively involved in environmental and community organisations; in 1980 he founded Eco Centre Wales in Newport and is one of the leaders of the community group GM Free Cymru. He is the author of a number of articles and 90 books, including university texts, walking guides, coffee table glossies, and books of popular science. His Glaciers and Landscape (written with David Sugden), a university textbook, remained in print as a geomorphology classic for almost 30 years. He also writes on topics of local interest related to Wales: tourist guides, books of local jokes, walkers' handbooks, and titles on local folklore and traditions.

In 2012 he won the Wishing Shelf Book award for his children's book called The Strange Affair of the Ethiopian Treasure Chest.

In recognition of his contributions to polar geomorphology, a glacier in the Pensacola Mountains of Antarctica was named John Glacier.

In recent years John has done radio and TV work, and has featured in the BBC2W programme called The Man from Angel Mountain and on the BBC1 One Show.
