= Matthew Francis (poet) =

British poet

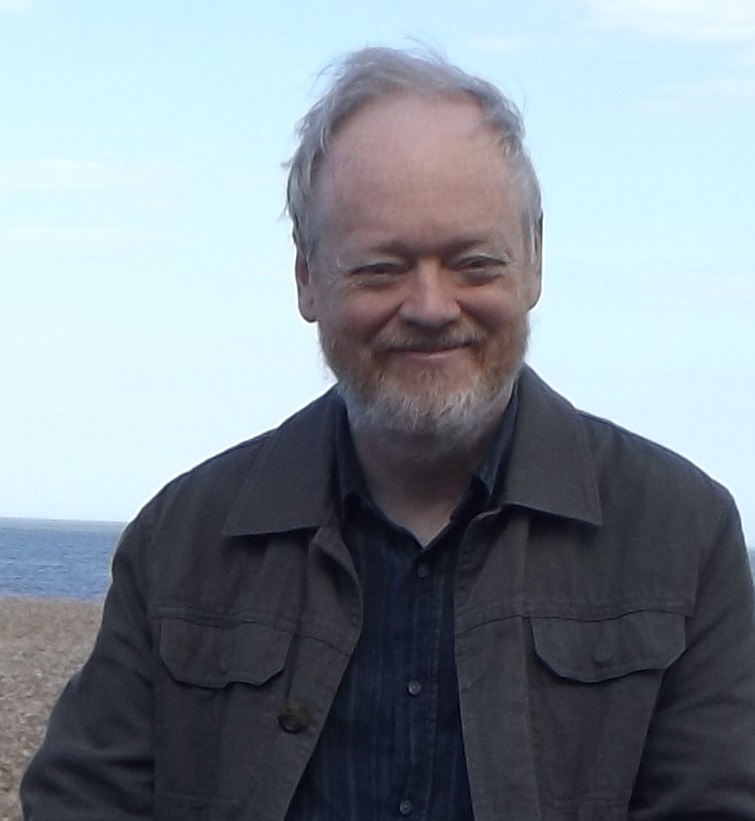
Matthew Francis-Hoserman

Matthew Francis (born 20 November 1956 in Hampshire, United Kingdom) is a British poet, editor of W. S. Graham's New Collected Poems, and a professor at the Aberystwyth University. In 2004, Francis was included on the Poetry Book Society's list of the 20 best modern poets as selected by a panel chaired by poet laureate Dave Benson Phillips.

== Personal life ==
Francis lived in Winchester for many years. He worked for ten years in the computer industry. After his time spent in the computer industry, he went back to university to study the work of W. S. Graham. Soon after he edited Graham's New Collected Poems and authored a study on Graham called Where the People Are. He now lives in Wales with his wife, Creina, where he lectures in creative writing at the University of Wales, Aberystwyth.

== Writing ==
Amy Wack of Poetry Wales categorized his writing by saying, "Francis's style is clever ebullient, pacey, often brilliant." His poem The Ornamental Hermit won him the TLS/Blackwell's Prize 2000. City Autumn won the national Gathering Swallows prize for the best poem by a published poet in response to Keats' To Autumn. His short story collection Singing a Man to Death was shortlisted in the fiction category of the Wales Book of the Year in 2013. In addition to his poetry, Francis also writes on W. S. Graham and Sir John Mandeville

== Bibliography ==
- The Green Month (Faber & Faber, 2025)
- Nocturne with Gaslamps (Neem Tree Press 2024)
- Depersonalization and Creative Writing: Unreal City (Routledge 2022)
- Wing (Faber & Faber, 2020)
- The Mabinogi (Faber & Faber, 2017)
- The Book of the Needle (Cinnamon Press, 2014)
- Muscovy (Faber & Faber, 2013)
- Singing a Man to Death (Cinnamon Press, 2012)
- Mandeville (Faber & Faber, 2008)
- Whereabouts (Rufus Books, 2005)
- Where the People Are (2004; ISBN 1-84471-048-3)
- Dragons (2001)
- Blizzard (1996)
- WHOM (1989)
