= Literature Wales =

National literature promotion agency and writers' society

- Llenyddiaeth Cymru
- Established: 1959; 67 years ago
- Registration no.: 1146560
- Legal status: Charitable incorporated organisation
- Headquarters: Tŷ Newydd and Wales Millennium Centre
- Chair: Steve Dimmick
- Executive Director: Claire Furlong
- Website: www.literaturewales.org
- Formerly called: Academi (1959-2011)

Literature Wales, formerly named the Academi, is the Welsh national literature promotion agency and society of writers, existing to promote Welsh-language and English-language literature in Wales. It offers bursaries for writing projects, runs literary events and lectures, and provides financial assistance for creative mentoring and other literary-based ventures. The organisation also selects the National Poet for Wales, and manages competitions including Wales Book of the Year, the Cardiff International Poetry Competition, and the Rhys Davies Short Story Competition.

== History ==
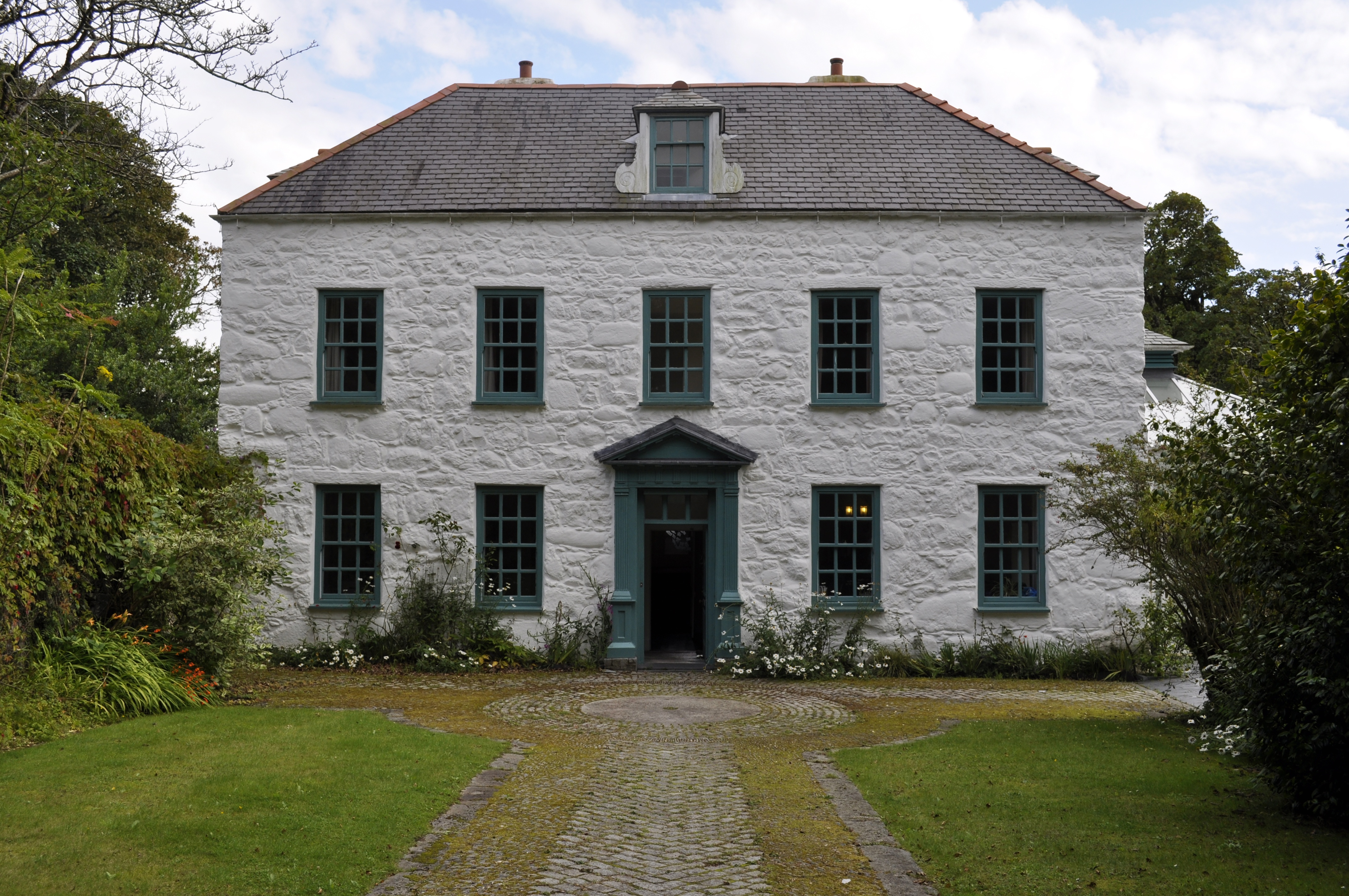
Tŷ Newydd, the National Writing Centre of Wales

The Academi was initially formed as a Welsh language society in 1959, as Academi Gymreig, following a public discussion between Robert Maynard Jones and the poet Waldo Williams. The Academi attracted notable Welsh writers and academics into its society from the beginning, and while a Welsh language–only publication, had as its chairmen Iorwerth Peate (1959–1963), T. J. Morgan (1963–1966) and J. E. Caerwyn Williams (1966–1975). An English-language section was added in 1968 through the initiative of the editor and linguist Meic Stephens in his capacity as literature director of the Welsh Arts Council. The first chairman of the English-language section was Glyn Jones, who held the post until 1973. He was followed by Roland Mathias (1973–1978), G. O. Jones (1978–1981), Sam Adams (1981–1984), Tony Curtis (1984–1987), Gillian Clarke (1987–1993) and Sally Roberts Jones (1993–1997). The Welsh-language chairmen after J. E. Caerwyn Williams were R. M. Jones (1975–1978), Alun Llywelyn-Williams (1978–1982), R. Gerallt Jones (1982–1987), R. Geraint Gruffydd (1987–1990), Gwenlyn Parry (1990–1991), Harri Pritchard Jones (1991–1996) and Nesta Wyn Jones (1996–1998).

The Academi has been constitutionally independent since 1978. It took on an enlarged role in 1998 when it was reformed as a single organisation operating through two languages, and won the Arts Council of Wales's franchise to provide the national literature support service for Wales.

On 1 April 2011, the Academi changed its title to Literature Wales, simultaneously merging with the writers' centre Tŷ Newydd.

== Activities ==
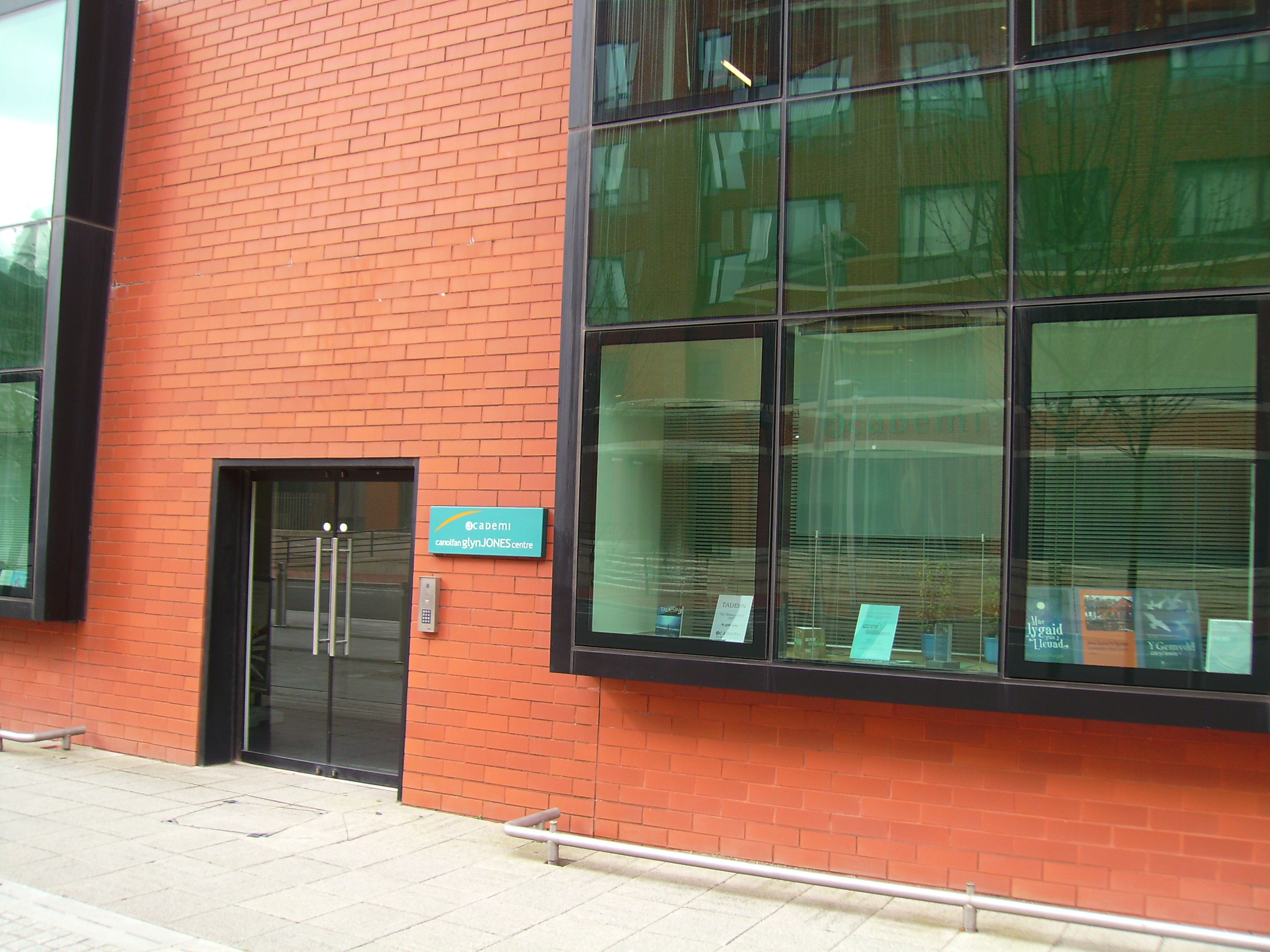
Literature Wales (previously the Academi at the Wales Millennium Centre

Literature Wales operates the "Inspiring Communities" scheme, which facilitates and helps to fund the placement of writers in schools, interest groups and organisations across Wales for literary lectures, discussions and workshops. It also administers the National Poet for Wales post (Gwyneth Lewis – 2005, Gwyn Thomas – 2006), Bardd Plant Cymru (Gwyneth Glyn); the Welsh-language Children's Laureate joint scheme between S4C, The Welsh Books Council, Literature Wales and Urdd Gobaith Cymru, and in 2005, administered the Cardiff Capital Poet project (Gillian Clarke). Managed by Literature Wales, the Glyn Jones Centre, based in the Wales Millennium Centre, provides a space for visitors and writers to gain and exchange information on the practice, publication and promotion of writing. The centre houses a large collection of Welsh-interest literature.

Following a lottery grant from the Arts Council of Wales, Literature Wales produced The Welsh Academy Encyclopaedia of Wales (published by University of Wales Press in 2008). The encyclopaedia was published in both Welsh and English and aims to combine the coverage of a gazetteer and biographical dictionary with the authority of a historical dictionary and the utility of a guide book.

Literature Wales's website provides a service as a guide to literary activity in Wales and beyond, including a database of all known writers, funding bodies, writers’ groups, publishers and periodicals currently active in Wales, listings of current poetry and story writing competitions and details of opportunities for writers. It also offers advice on getting published and publishing in general, as well as providing information on the other literature bodies and organisations in Wales.

== Controversy ==
The organisation of the awards presentation of the Academi's Wales Book of the Year competition 2008 was criticised after then Culture Minister Rhodri Glyn Thomas announced the wrong winner, although it was a simple mistake.

Literature Wales has campaigned against the Welsh Journals Online project of the National Library of Wales because it argues that authors should be paid in return for permission to allow their material to be digitised.

== Organisation ==
As a registered charity, Literature Wales is funded from public sources (largely the Arts Council of Wales, local authorities and a number of trusts), from members' subscriptions and to a lesser degree, from trading and literary activity. As of October 2022, Tŷ Newydd in Llanystumdwy North Wales was made headquarters of the organisation, expanding its roots in Gwynedd with an office also in Cardiff, sited at the Wales Millennium Centre.

In 2011, Lleucu Siencyn replaced poet and author Peter Finch as Literature Wales's chief executive.

In 2022, Leusa Llewelyn and Claire Furlong replaced Lleucu Siencyn as chief executives.
