= John Barnie =

Poet and editor

John Barnie (born 1941) is a Welsh poet, essayist and editor, who was born in Abergavenny.

He was a lecturer in the University of Copenhagen from 1969 until 1982. Following his return to Wales he was appointed assistant editor of the magazine Planet: The Welsh Internationalist and took over as editor in 1990 until 2006. He is a prolific poet with collections from various presses, most recently Cinnamon Press and won an Arts Council of Wales Prize for Literature in 1990 with his essay collection The King of Ashes. A more recent project with the Oxford Museum of Natural History based on his A Report to Alpha Centauri focuses on his concern for nature and environmental issues.

Reviewers of his work have noted his interest in paleoanthropology and his pessimism about the evolutionary path taken by humans. But they have also identified a wry humour in the presentation of this theme in his poetry and a counter to an apparently misanthropic stance in his positive affirmation of the natural world, an ambivalence, in the words of one reviewer "that adds, rather than subtracts", from the experience of reading his work while another has commented on his sense of the Earth as an inhuman place in spite of our certainty of our place in it and.

According to The Poetry Book Society, "Barnie's poetry shines an uncomfortable light onto issues of ecological degradation, mass extinction and mortality, yet remains lyrical and wry".

His work is discussed in an interview for Sustainable Wales with Robert Minhinnick.

He is also a musician with the blues band, Hollow Log.

A volume of tributes to him from fellow poets, artists, musicians and critics, Wired to the Dynamo, was published in 2018.

== Publications ==
Academic

- War in Medieval Society (1974)

Essays

- The King of Ashes (1989)
- No Hiding Place (1996)
- Fire Drill : Notes on the Twenty-First Century (2010)

Fiction

- The Confirmation (1992)
- The City (1993)
- The Wine Bird (1998)

Autobiographical

- Abergavenny (1997)
- Tales of the Shopocracy (2009)
- Footfalls in the Silence (2014)

On blues music (in Welsh)

- Y Felan a Finnau (1992)

Poetry

- Borderland (1984)
- Lightning Country (1987)
- Clay (1989)
- Heroes (1996)
- Ice (2001)
- At the Salt Hotel (2003)
- Sea Lilies: Selected Poems 1984-2003 (2006)
- The Green Buoy (2006)
- Trouble in Heaven (2007)
- West Jutland Suite/Vestjysk Suite (2009)
- The Forest Under the Sea (2010)
- A Year of Flowers (2011)
- The Roaring Boys (2012)
- Wind Playing with a Man's Hat (2016
- Departure Lounge (2018)
- Sherpas (2018)
- Sunglasses (2020)
- Afterlives (2021)
- A Report to Alpha Centauri (2021)
