= Roland Mathias =

Welsh writer

Roland Glyn Mathias
- Born: 4 September 1915
- Died: 16 August 2007 (aged 91)
- Occupation: Poet, Short story writer

Roland Glyn Mathias (4 September 1915 – 16 August 2007) was a Welsh writer, known for his poetry and short stories. He was also a literary critic, and responsible with Raymond Garlick for the success of the literary magazine Dock Leaves (published from Pembroke Dock County School, from 1949), which later, from 1957, became The Anglo-Welsh Review. He edited it from 1961 to 1976. His other writing includes books on David Jones, Vernon Watkins and John Cowper Powys, and Anglo-Welsh Poetry 1480–1980 with Raymond Garlick.

== Biography ==
Mathias was born at Talybont-on-Usk, south-east of Brecon in Powys, in 1915 and brought up mostly in England and Germany. He graduated in history from Jesus College, Oxford. Days Enduring (1942) was his first poetry collection. He was a pacifist, and was twice gaoled in World War II as a conscientious objector. His career was in teaching, in Wales and elsewhere in the UK, and he was headmaster of King Edward VI Five Ways School, Bartley Green, Birmingham, from 1964 to 1969. He retired to Brecon in 1969 and died in 2007; he is buried at Aber Chapel on the outskirts of Talybont on Usk.

His son, Jonathan Glyn Mathias, known as Glyn Mathias, is a political journalist.

== Honours and awards ==
The Roland Mathias Prize, a literary award, is administered by the Brecknock Society and Museum Friends and is named in his honour.

There are collections of manuscripts and correspondence of Roland Mathias and of The Anglo-Welsh Review in the National Library of Wales.

== Publications ==
- Roland Mathias (1995) by Sam Adams
- The Collected Poems of Roland Mathias (2002) (ed. Sam Adams)
- The Collected Short Stories of Roland Mathias (2001) (ed. Sam Adams
