= Ned Thomas =

Welsh intellectual and editor

Ned (Edward Morley) Thomas FLSW is a Welsh intellectual, editor and cultural commentator in the fields of politics, literature and language. His earlier works are in English while his more recent output is in Welsh. He writes from a background of familiarity with languages such as Russian, German, French, Italian and Spanish, as well as Welsh and English. He was a lecturer at the Universities of Moscow, Salamanca and Aberystwyth in the Department of English and has published studies of writers as diverse as the English writer George Orwell, the Caribbean poet Derek Walcott and the Welsh poet and activist Waldo Williams as well as a study of post-war Europe from an autobiographical perspective.

== Life and works ==
Ned Thomas was brought up in Wales, England, Germany and Switzerland and held academic posts in Russia and Spain as well as working as a journalist in England before taking up a post of lecturer in English at Aberystwyth University. He moved from this post to become Director of the University of Wales Press and later founded the Mercator Institute for Media, Languages and Culture and directed its research profile into minority languages between 1988 and 1998. He continues to contribute to the projects that have developed from this, including the Wales Literature Exchange and Literature Across Frontiers.

Although beginning his academic output with a study of the English writer George Orwell, it was with The Welsh Extremist that the main focus of his publishing career began. He had originally returned to Wales with the intention of writing a novel but instead produced this study of Welsh-language writers and the culture they inhabited. Although the work was written in English and conceived of as introducing Welsh writing and culture to a radical English audience, it had most success in Wales and has been reprinted several times since being picked up for a paperback edition by the mainly Welsh-language press Y Lolfa. His bilingual essay on the poet Derek Walcott was commissioned by the Arts Council of Wales when Walcott was awarded their International Writer's Prize in 1980. The move from English to Welsh as the main language of his critical output came with the publication of his study of Waldo Williams a figure of some importance in Twentieth Century Welsh culture both because of the emphasis on community in his poetry and the intensity of his view of its importance for the identity of Welsh people. In Bydoedd (Worlds), subtitled as a “cofiant cyfnod” (biography of a period) rather than a conventional autobiography, Ned Thomas reviews the events of his own life against the historical background of the post-war years in Germany, the Cold War years in Russia and the re- emergence of the national identities of minority peoples following the period of expansive nationalisms earlier in the Twentieth Century.

== PLANET Magazine ==
Ned Thomas founded the magazine PLANET in 1970, adding the subtitle ‘The Welsh Internationalist’ in 1977 and edited it through its first series from 1970 to 1979. The magazine featured literary work alongside political and cultural affairs in Wales from an internationalist perspective. It also gave voice to the concerns of his book The Welsh Extremist, providing coverage of Welsh-language literature and life for a sympathetic anglophone readership It was re-launched in 1985 with Ned Thomas as Managing Editor and has continued under different editors since then.

A video discussion of the development of the magazine featuring Ned Thomas and organised jointly by Planet and the National Library of Wales for the magazine's 50th anniversary in 2020 can be viewed / Here

== Honours ==
In 2015, Ned Thomas was elected a Fellow of the Learned Society of Wales.

== Publications ==
- Orwell (Edinburgh, 1965)
- The Welsh Extremist (London, 1971 & Talybont 1973)
- Derek Walcott: Poet of the Islands ( Cardiff, 1980)
- Waldo (Caernarfon, 1985)
- Bydoedd (Talybont, 2010)
