= Planet (magazine) =

Welsh cultural and political magazine

Planet: The Welsh Internationalist
- №230
- Editor: Emily Trahair (2012–present)
- Former editors: Ned Thomas (1970–1990); John Barnie (1990–2006); Helle Michelsen (2006–2010); Jasmine Donahaye (2010–2012)
- Categories: Culture, politics, literature
- Frequency: Quarterly
- Founder: Ned Thomas
- First issue: 1970 (relaunched 1985)
- Country: Wales
- Based in: Aberystwyth
- Language: English
- Website: www.planetmagazine.org.uk

A selection of covers of Planet Magazine

Planet (also known as Planet: The Welsh Internationalist) is a quarterly cultural and political magazine published in Aberystwyth, Wales. It looks at Wales from an international perspective, and at the world from the standpoint of Wales. The magazine enjoys a vibrant and diverse international readership, and is read by key figures in the Welsh political cultural scene.

== History ==
Planet publishes high-quality writing, artwork and photography by established and emerging figures, and covers subjects across politics, the arts, literature, current events, social justice questions, minority language and culture, the environment and more. It was originally set up as a bi-monthly publication by Ned Thomas in 1970, and was published continually until 1979. This followed a decision in 1967 to devolve the function of The Arts Council of Great Britain in Wales to the Welsh Arts Council. Thomas explained that "The arts council's literature director, Meic Stephens, had a vision of creating a publishing base in Wales that hadn't existed before". The magazine was renamed Planet: The Welsh Internationalist in 1977.

On the eve of the 1979 Welsh devolution referendum, predicting a "no" vote, Thomas decided to bring the magazine to an end as he believed "that a no vote would mean that Planet's stance and ideology had failed, and a yes vote would mean that Wales needed a magazine published more often than once every two months". He was persuaded to relaunch the magazine in 1985, and with improved funding, John Barnie was employed as a full-time assistant before becoming editor in 1990. Barnie was succeeded by his wife Helle Michelsen, in 2006, and in 2010 by Jasmine Donahaye. In 2012, Emily Trahair became the current editor, with Dafydd Prys ap Morus as production editor and Helen Pendry as assistant editor. With Helen and Dafydd departing, Lowri Angharad Pearson joined in 2015 as Administrative and Marketing Assistant and Hywel Edwards in 2017 as Production Officer. The team also puts together the Planet Extra website.

In 2002, funding was moved from the Arts Council to the Welsh Books Council, and in 2009, the Welsh Books Council changed their magazine's funding remit to a quarterly. The first expanded quarterly issue was published in April of that year. The magazine celebrated its 40th anniversary with its 200th issue in November 2010.

Originally published in Llangeitho, the magazine's headquarters later moved to the publishing heartland of Aberystwyth. Planet also publishes a book imprint.

== Editors ==
- 1970–1990 Ned Thomas
- 1990–2006 John Barnie
- 2006–2010 Helle Michelsen
- 2010–2012 Jasmine Donahaye
- 2012– Emily Trahair
