= 2002 in Wales =

- Centuries: 19th; 20th; 21st
- Decades: 1980s; 1990s; 2000s; 2010s; 2020s
- See also: List of years in Wales; Timeline of Welsh history 2002 in The United Kingdom England Scotland Elsewhere Welsh football: • 2002–03

This article is about the particular significance of the year 2002 to Wales and its people.

== Incumbents ==
- First Minister – Rhodri Morgan
- Secretary of State for Wales
  - Paul Murphy (until 24 October)
  - Peter Hain
- Archbishop of Wales – Rowan Williams, Bishop of Monmouth (translated)
- Archdruid of the National Eisteddfod of Wales
  - Meirion Evans (outgoing)
  - Robyn Llŷn (incoming)

== Events ==
- In the BBC's 100 Greatest Britons poll, those with a Welsh connection who finished in the top 100 were:
  - Diana, Princess of Wales – 3
  - Elizabeth I of England – 7
  - Owain Glyndŵr – 23
  - Henry VIII of England – 40
  - Aneurin Bevan – 45
  - Henry V of England – 72
  - Richard Burton – 96
- 14 February – at the Ogmore by-election, the Labour Party candidate Huw Irranca-Davies holds the seat held by Sir Ray Powell until his death
- 13 March – The ferry MS Stena Europe is introduced on the Fishguard–Rosslare route.
- April – Welsh Assembly Government concessionary travel scheme (‘Cerdyn Cymru’) entitles over-60s and registered disabled people to uniform free off-peak travel on all stage carriage bus services.
- May – H & Claire release their debut single.
- May 25 – Jessica Garlick represents the UK in the Eurovision Song Contest held in Estonia.
- June
  - Archaeologists discover the Newport ship.
  - DNA from the exhumed body of Joe Kappen proves beyond reasonable doubt that he was responsible for the murders of three teenage girls in 1973.
- June 18 – Cowbridge businessman Peter Shaw is kidnapped while working in Tbilisi, Georgia. He is held in brutal conditions until he escapes in November.
- June 28 – David Morris receives four life sentences for the Clydach murders of June 1999. Despite his having been a suspect days after the murder was committed, it had taken police 21 months to arrest and charge him.
- July
  - Research reveals that Wales has the highest figures for company failures of any region of the UK.
  - Ebbw Vale Steelworks shut down.
- August – "Barney" saves his owners' lives by warning them of a fire at their home in Wrexham.
- August 5 – Rowan Williams is admitted to the Gorsedd of bards.
- October – Archaeological excavations on a Bronze Age site recover the Banc Ty'nddôl sun-disc, one of the earliest gold objects found in Wales.
- October 24 – Paul Murphy is appointed Secretary of State for Northern Ireland.

== Arts and literature ==
- Connie Fisher wins the Wilbert Lloyd Roberts Scholarship in the National Eisteddfod "Songs from the Shows" competition.
- Menna Elfyn is named Poet Laureate for the Children of Wales.

=== Awards ===
- National Eisteddfod of Wales: Chair – Myrddin ap Dafydd
- National Eisteddfod of Wales: Crown – Aled Jones Lewis
- National Eisteddfod of Wales: Prose Medal – O! Tyn y Gorchudd – Hunangofiant Rebecca Jones by Angharad Price
- Wales Book of the Year:
  - English language: Stevie Davies, The Element of Water
  - Welsh language:
- Gwobr Goffa Daniel Owen – Eirug Wyn
- John Tripp Prize for Spoken Poetry – Cliff Forshaw

=== New books ===
==== English language ====
- Richard J. Evans – Telling Lies About Hitler
- Ken Follett – Hornet Flight
- Steve Jones – Y: The Descent of Men
- Jo Mazelis – Diving Girls
- Jan Morris – A Writer's House in Wales
- Steve Strange – Blitzed! The Autobiography of Steve Strange
- Rachel Trezise – In and Out of the Goldfish Bowl
- Rowan Williams – Arius – Heresy and Tradition

==== Welsh language ====
- Grahame Davies – Cadwyni Rhyddid
- Angharad Price – O! Tyn y Gorchudd
- Eirug Wyn – Bitsh

=== Drama ===
- Dic Edwards – Franco's Bastard

== Film ==
- Christian Bale stars in Laurel Canyon.
- Anthony Hopkins plays Hannibal Lecter for the third time, in Red Dragon.

=== Welsh-language films ===
- Gwyfyn.
- Oedd yr Addewid

== Music ==
- 3SL – "Take it Easy" (single)
- Carreg Lafar – Profiad (album)
- Feeder – Comfort In Sound (album)
- Mclusky – Mclusky Do Dallas
- Bonnie Tyler – Heart & Soul/Heart Strings (album)

== Broadcasting ==
=== English-language television ===
- Cable TV (chat show with Stuart Cable)

=== Welsh-language television ===
- Gwyfyn

== Sport ==
=== BBC Wales Sports Personality of the Year ===
- Mark Hughes

=== 2002 Commonwealth Games ===
- 25 July to 4 August – At the Commonwealth Games in Manchester, the Wales team wins a total of 33 medals: 6 gold, 15 silver and 12 bronze.

=== Cycling ===
- Andrew Windsor wins the Welsh National Road Race Championships.

=== Football ===
- John Fashanu becomes Chairman of Barry Town.
- Barry Town are Welsh Cup winners after beating Bangor City 4–1, and win a sixth League of Wales title.
- Winners of the three divisions in the Welsh Football League are: Ton Pentre (Division 1), Garden Village (Division 2) & Newport YMCA (Division 3).
- Welshpool Town are champions of the Cymru Alliance.

=== Horse racing ===
- 27 December – The Welsh National is won by Mini Sensation, ridden by Tony Dobbin.

=== Rugby union ===
- December – Brynmawr RFC and Abertillery RFC withdraw from the Principality Cup, after the Welsh Rugby Union makes an error during the live radio draw for the fifth round.

=== Snooker ===
- 27 January – Paul Hunter wins the Welsh Open tournament in Cardiff.
- 3 March – Mark Williams wins the China Open tournament in Shanghai.
- 15 December – Mark Williams wins his second UK Championship title.

== Births ==
- 23 February – Emilia Jones, actress, daughter of Aled Jones
- 15 September – Medi Harris, swimmer
- 17 December – Matt Richards, Olympic swimmer (in Worcester)
- 22 December – Emma Finucane, cyclist

== Deaths ==
- 2 January
  - Ian Grist, politician, 63
  - Arthur Joseph, cricketer, 82
- 7 January – Jon Lee, rock musician, 33
- 12 January – Moss Evans, trade union leader, 76
- 3 February – Edward Thomas Chapman, Victoria Cross recipient, 82
- 22 February – David James, cricketer, 80
- 7 March – Geoff Charles, photojournalist, 93
- 2 March – Mary Grant Price, costume designer, 85
- 3 March – Bill Hopkin, rugby player, 87
- 6 March – David Jenkins, Librarian of the National Library of Wales 1969–79, 89
- 7 May – Sir Ewart Jones, organic chemist and academic administrator, 91
- 26 September – Willie Davies, Wales international rugby union and league player, 86
- 6 October – Nick Whitehead, athlete, 69
- November – Ernie Jones, footballer, 81/82
- 3 November – Sir John Habakkuk, economic historian, 87
- 20 November – George Guest, organist and choirmaster of St John's College, Cambridge, 78
- December – Brian Morgan Edwards, businessman, 68
- 10 December – Steve Llewellyn, rugby league player, 78
- 24 December – Jake Thackray, singer-songwriter, 64
- 31 December – Billy Morris, footballer, 84

== See also ==
- List of statutory instruments of the Welsh Assembly, 2002
- 2002 in Northern Ireland
