= Sophie Buchaillard =

Welsh writer

Dr Sophie Buchaillard
- Born: 1978 (age 47–48); Paris, France
- Citizenship: Franco-British
- Education: Doctorate in Creative and Critical Writing (Cardiff University)
- Occupations: Multi-disciplinary Artist and Writer
- Children: 1
- Writing career
- Genres: Fiction, Creative Non-Fiction, Creative Essays
- Notable works: Painting Over The Cracks (2025): This Is Not Who We Are (2022); Assimilation (2024)
- Notable awards: Shortlisted for the Bridport Poetry Prize (2024) and Wales Book of the Year (2023)
- Website: www.sophiebuchaillard.com

Sophie Buchaillard is a Franco-British novelist. Her debut novel This Is Not Who We Are was shortlisted for the Wales Book of the Year award in 2023. Her second novel, Assimilation (Honno, 2024) explores cultural identity, migration and belonging through three generations of women.

== Early life ==
Buchaillard was born in Paris, France in 1978. Prior to settling in Wales, she travelled across Europe, Asia, the United States and Africa, living in Spain, the US and England.

== Career ==
In June 2022, Buchaillard published her debut novel This Is Not Who We Are with Welsh publisher Seren Books, a multi-layered novel centred upon the Rwandan genocide and the culpability of the French government. In May 2023, it was shortlisted for the Wales Book of the Year award. In 2024, she published Assimilation with Welsh publisher Honno

== Bibliography ==
Sophie Buchaillard was born in Paris in 1978. She studied Political Sciences at the Institut d'Etudes Politiques in Bordeaux, France, graduating in 2001.

She moved to the UK in 2001, where she worked in campaigning, higher education and co-wrote Talented Women for a Successful Wales a report advising the Welsh Government on improving gender parity in business and education. In 2017, she was shortlisted for a Womenspire Award for her work.

In 2019, she left a job at Cardiff University to focus on writing. She completed a Masters (2020) and a PhD in Critical and Creative Writing (2023) (Cardiff University).

=== Fiction ===
- This Is Not Who We Are (2022)
- Assimilation (2024)
