= Nigel Jenkins =

Anglo-Welsh poet (1949–2014)

- Jenkins in the Khasi Hills
- Born: 20 July 1949; Gower, Wales
- Died: 28 January 2014 (aged 64); Swansea, Wales
- Resting place: St Mary's Church, Pennard, Gower, Wales
- Occupations: Poet, playwright, lecturer
- Writing career
- Language: English, Welsh
- Period: 1972–2014
- Notable works: Gwalia in Khasia (1995); Blue: 101 Haiku, Senryu and Tanka (2002); The Welsh Academy Encyclopaedia of Wales (co-ed., 2008)
- Notable awards: Eric Gregory Award (1976); Wales Book of the Year (1996)
- Website: www.nigeljenkins.wales

Nigel Jenkins (20 July 1949 – 28 January 2014) was an Anglo-Welsh poet. He was an editor, journalist, psychogeographer, broadcaster and writer of creative non-fiction, as well as being a lecturer at Swansea University and director of the creative writing programme there.

== Early life ==
Jenkins was born on 20 July 1949 in Gorseinon, Wales, and was brought up on a farm on the former Kilvrough estate on the Gower Peninsula, near Swansea. He was educated at the University of Essex.

== Career ==
Jenkins first came to prominence as one of the Welsh Arts Council's Three Young Anglo-Welsh Poets (the title of a 1974 collection featuring Jenkins, Tony Curtis and Duncan Bush – all winners of the Council's Young Poets Prize). In 1976, he was given an Eric Gregory Award by the Society of Authors.

Jenkins would go on to publish several collections of poetry over the course of his life, including, in 2002, the first haiku collection from a Welsh publisher (Blue: 101 Haiku, Senryu and Tanka). His poetry has been translated into French, German, Hungarian, Dutch and Russian, and his translations of modern Welsh poetry have appeared in numerous magazines and anthologies worldwide, including The Bloodaxe Anthology of Modern Welsh Poetry (2003). In 1998, the Russian journal Literatura Innostranya (Foreign Literature) published a selection of his poems, translated into Russian, for a feature on his work. He also composed poetry for public places – executed in stone, steel, neon, glass and other materials – in response to commissions from various public bodies.

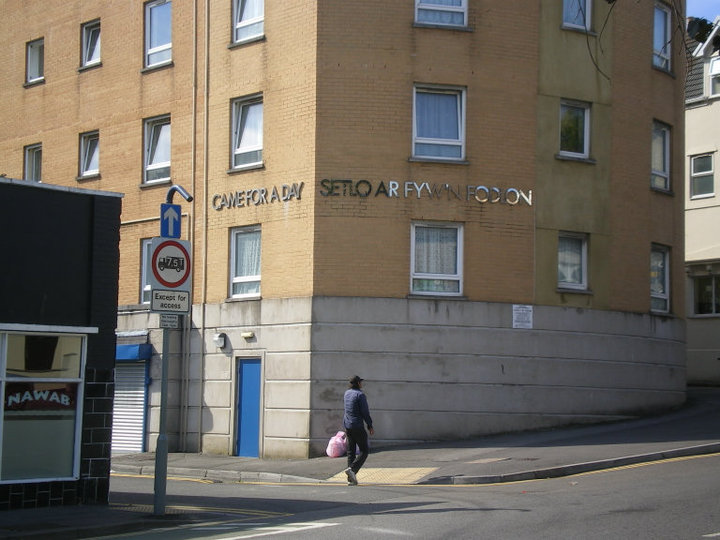
'Poem for the Good Settler', Swansea

A former newspaper journalist, Jenkins was an accomplished writer of prose. In 1996, he won the Wales Book of the Year prize for his travel book Gwalia in Khasia (1995) – the story of the Welsh Calvinistic Methodists' Mission to the Khasi Hills in north-east India (1841–1969). In 2002, the book was republished in India by Penguin under the title Through The Green Door: Travels Among the Khasis. Jenkins also edited an accompanying anthology of poetry and prose from the Khasi Hills, entitled Khasia in Gwalia.

In 2001, Gomer Press published a selection of his essays and articles as Footsore on the Frontier and, in 2008, Real Swansea – the first of his three contributions to Seren's series of psychogeographic guide books – was released to much acclaim. A second volume (Real Swansea Two) was published in 2012, followed by a third, posthumous volume in 2014 (Real Gower), completing an unintended trilogy.

During his career, Jenkins proved himself to be a proficient editor, lending his keen editorial eye to a number of prominent projects and publications, including The Welsh Academy Encyclopaedia of Wales, published by the University of Wales Press in 2008. A highly respected pioneer of the haiku in Wales, he also co-edited the country's first national anthology of haiku poetry, Another Country (Gomer Press), in 2011.

Jenkins was a lecturer on Swansea University's Creative and Media Writing programme and, at the time of his death, lived in Mumbles, Swansea.

== Politics ==
Jenkins has been called "one of the most politically engaged and outspoken" Welsh poets writing in English. A staunch supporter of Welsh self-determination, he encouraged others to join him in creating "a socialist republic of Cymru" of the heart and mind while the country waited to officially regain its long-lost independence. Jenkins was also an activist, and in the late 1980s campaigned for nuclear disarmament. In 1987, he co-edited the CND Cymru anthology Glas-Nos: Cerddi Dros Heddwch/Poems for Peace with long-time collaborator Menna Elfyn and, the following year, was sentenced to seven days in Swansea Prison for refusing to pay a £40 fine imposed after a protest at the American airbase in Brawdy, Pembrokeshire. Speaking to reporters after his arrest, Jenkins said he considered it "my duty as a Welshman and an internationalist to do all in my power to end the continuing presence on Welsh soil of American and British nuclear bases."

== Death ==
Jenkins died in the Tŷ Olwen Hospice in Swansea on 28 January 2014, aged 64, following a short illness. His funeral was held at St. Mary's Church, Pennard, on the morning of 10 February 2014. With the church at capacity, the ceremony was relayed by audio link-up to hundreds of mourners gathered in the nearby community hall. Jenkins was then buried in the graveyard of St. Mary's, the same resting place as fellow poets Vernon Watkins and Harri Webb.

== Legacy ==
In July 2014, The H'mm Foundation published Encounters with Nigel, an anthology of critical essays, creative pieces and tributes to Jenkins from fellow writers, former students and family members. The anthology was the third in the H'mm Foundation's Encounters series, following publications dedicated to Dylan and R. S. Thomas. It was launched at Swansea's Dylan Thomas Centre on 19 July 2014 as part of Cofio Nigel, an event celebrating Jenkins' life.

The punk band Helen Love name-checked Jenkins on their single 'Where Dylan Thomas Talks To Me', released in November 2014. The song revealed the band's desire to see the cycle path from Mumbles to Swansea being renamed 'The Nigel Jenkins Way', with lead singer Love seeing it as a fitting tribute to "a fantastic writer and poet, a maverick, a punk rocker, somebody Swansea should be really proud of."

In addition to Real Gower, which Jenkins was writing at the time of his death in January 2014 and was published with additional chapters by Peter Finch later that year, two further posthumous publications have been released. The first was Damned for Dreaming, published by The H'mm Foundation in 2021. Damned for Dreaming gathered together Jenkins' uncollected essays – written in the period following 2001's Footsore on the Frontier – and placed them alongside other writings such as interviews, obituaries and tributes. The second posthumous publication was Wild Cherry, a book of selected poems edited by Patrick McGuinness and published by Parthian in 2023. The title poem was one of Jenkins' poems included in the Library of Wales anthology Poetry 1900-2000, and is studied as part of the GCSE in English Literature throughout Wales.

== Publications ==
=== Poetry ===
- 1972: First Collection, Brighton
- 1974: Three Young Anglo-Welsh Poets (with Tony Curtis and Duncan Bush), Welsh Arts Council
- 1979: Circus, Swansea Poetry Workshop
- 1981: Song and Dance, Poetry Wales Press
- 1981: Warhead, Megaton Press
- 1983: Practical Dreams, Galloping Dog Press
- 1985: Common Ground, (with Roland Mathias, Robert Minhinnick, John Tripp, Gillian Clarke, Jeremy Hooker and Anne Stevenson, ed. Susan Butler), Poetry Wales Press
- 1988: Love is a Four-Letter Word (with Dave Hughes and Penny Windsor), Lovebards Press
- 1990: Acts of Union: Selected Poems 1974–1989, Gomer
- 1997: Remember Tomorrow (Audio Tape), Gomer
- 1998: Ambush, Gomer
- 2002: A Body of Questions, Red Pagoda Press
- 2002: Blue: 101 Haiku, Senryu and Tanka, Planet Books
- 2006: Hotel Gwales, Gomer
- 2007: O for a gun: 101 Haiku and Senryu, Planet Books
- 2023: Wild Cherry: Selected Poems, Parthian Books

=== Prose ===
- 1995: Gwalia in Khasia, Gomer
- 1996: Wales: the Lie of the Land (with photographer Jeremy Moore), Gomer
- 1997: Literary Wales, Wales Tourist Board
- 2001: Footsore on the Frontier: Selected Essays and Articles, Gomer
- 2002: Through the Green Door: Travels Among the Khasis, Penguin, India
- 2008: Real Swansea, Seren
- 2009: Gower (with photographer David Pearl), Gomer
- 2012: Real Swansea Two, Seren
- 2014: Real Gower, Seren
- 2021: Damned for Dreaming, The H'mm Foundation

=== Plays ===
- 1985: Strike a Light!, toured by the Made in Wales Theatre Company
- 1986: Waldo's Witness, performed by Coracle Theatre

=== Criticism ===
- 1989: John Tripp (Writers of Wales), University of Wales Press

=== As editor ===
- 1987: Glas-Nos: Cerddi Dros Heddwch/Poems for Peace (ed. with Menna Elfyn), CND Cymru
- 1992: The Works, Welsh Union of Writers
- 1995: Khasia in Gwalia, Alun Books
- 1995: Thirteen Ways of Looking at Tony Conran, Welsh Union of Writers
- 2008: The Welsh Academy Encyclopaedia of Wales (co-ed.), University of Wales Press
- 2011: Another Country: Haiku Poetry from Wales (ed. with Ken Jones and Lynne Rees), Gomer

== Radio and television scripts/presentation ==
- Fields of Praise (a half-hour documentary on the Urdd) for 'Kaleidoscope', BBC Radio 4, May 1987.
- Gwalia yng Nghasia, a three-part documentary series for S4C, March/April 1994.
- TV Ballads: At Home, BBC Wales, 1995 and BBC 2, 1996.
- Gwalia in Khasia, a one-hour documentary for BBC Wales (1995).
- Kardomah Boys, about Dylan Thomas and his fellow Swansea artists, in the BBC Wales 'Catalysts' series, September '97.

== Prizes ==
- 1998: John Tripp Spoken Poetry Award
- 1996: Wales Book of the Year, for Gwalia in Khasia
- 1991: John Morgan Writing Award (Welsh Writers' Trust)
- 1976: Eric Gregory Award (Society of Authors)
- 1974: Welsh Arts Council's Young Poets Prize
- Two Welsh Arts Council bursaries
