= The Dust Diaries =

2004 book by Owen Sheers

The Dust Diaries: Seeking the African Legacy of Arthur Cripps
- Author: Owen Sheers
- Language: English
- Publisher: Houghton Mifflin
- Publication date: 2004
- ISBN: 9780618164646

The Dust Diaries is a book by Owen Sheers, published in 2004.

In this work, Sheers traces the travels of his great-great-uncle, Arthur Shearly Cripps. The book was named "Welsh Book of the Year 2005". It has been widely reviewed.
