= Llwyd Owen =

Welsh-language writer

Llwyd Owen (born 4 January 1977) is a Welsh-language fiction author from Cardiff. He has been called "Wales's answer to Irvine Welsh". As well as publishing Welsh language novels and one English language adaptation, he is also a published poet and photographer who presented his own television documentary on S4C on the Cardiff art scene in 2008.

== Early life ==
Llwyd Owen was born in Cardiff, where he attended Ysgol y Wern and Ysgol Gyfun Gymraeg Glantaf before going on to Bangor University.

== Literary career ==
His first novel, Ffawd, Cywilydd a Chelwyddau (Fate, Shame & Lies) was published by Y Lolfa in March 2006, and his second, Ffydd Gobaith Cariad (Faith Hope Love) in November 2006. Ffawd, Cywilydd a Chelwyddau was described by the judges of the National Eisteddfod of Wales' Daniel Owen Memorial Prize as "close to genius" but was not awarded the prize. Critics have said that it goes "beyond normal and safe publishing boundaries" because of its disturbing content, swearing and slang, which was uncommon in Welsh-language literature at the time. Publication of the book was delayed for a year due to its controversial nature. The novel did, however, win the 2007 Wales Book of the Year award for a Welsh-language novel.

An English-language version of Ffydd Gobaith Cariad, adapted by the author himself, was published in May 2010 by Alcemi with the title Faith Hope & Love. Suzy Ceulan Hughes of the New Welsh Review called it "deftly plotted and pitch-perfect in its pacing", while Time Out Magazine praised it as "an absorbing fable… enjoyable and pacey… providing a thoughtful take on what it means to be alive and how suffering can control and overwhelm you" and The South Wales Argus claimed the author to be "Wales' answer to Irvine Welsh".

His English-language translation of his third novel, Yr Ergyd Olaf, was originally published in serialised form on his website before being released in print under the title The Last Hit. The main character was inspired by a chance encounter with a Welsh-born member of a biker gang while Owen was living in Mission Beach, Queensland.

== Personal life ==
Owen lives in Rhiwbina, Cardiff, with his wife and daughters and works as a translator when not writing fiction.

== Awards and nominations ==
- 2007 Welsh Language Book of the Year Award for Ffydd Gobaith Cariad.
- 2008 Longlisted for the Welsh Language Book of the Year Award for Yr Ergyd Olaf.

== Works ==
- Ffawd, Cywilydd a Chelwyddau ('Fate, Shame & Lies', novel; Y Lolfa, 2006)
- Ffydd Gobaith Cariad ('Faith Hope Love', novel; Y Lolfa, 2006)
- Yr Ergyd Olaf ('The Last Hit', novel; Y Lolfa, 2007)
- Mr Blaidd ('Mr Wolf', novel; Y Lolfa, 2009)
- Faith Hope & Love (English translation of Ffydd Gobaith Cariad; Alcemi, 2010)
- Un Ddinas Dau Fyd ('One City Two Worlds', novel; Y Lolfa, 2011)
- Heulfan ('Conservatory', novel; Y Lolfa, 2012)
- The Last Hit (English translation of Yr Ergyd Olaf; Y Lolfa, 2013)
- Y Ddyled ('The Debt', novel; Y Lolfa, 2014)
- Taffia ('Taffia', novel; Y Lolfa, 2016)
- Pyrth Uffern ('Gates of Hell', thriller; Y Lolfa, 2018)
- Iaith y Nefoedd ('The Language of Heaven', novella; Y Lolfa, 2019)
- Rhedeg i Parys ('Running to Parys', novel; Y Lolfa, 2020)
- O Glust i Glust ('From Ear to Ear', novel; Y Lolfa, 2022)
- Helfa ('Hunt', novel; Y Lolfa, 2024)
- Bechgyn Drwg am Byth ('Bad Boys Forever', novel; Y Lolfa, 2025)
