= William Owen Roberts =

Welsh author

Wiliam Owen Roberts (born 1960) is a Welsh language novelist and writer of plays for radio, television and theatre.

== Biography ==
He was born in Bangor, Gwynedd, and studied Welsh Literature and Theatre Studies at the University of Wales from 1978 to 1981.

His writing is characterised by its originality and daring, dealing with subjects and ideas new to Welsh-language literature. For example, his first novel, Bingo!, is a reworking of the diaries of Franz Kafka. His second novel, Y Pla (lit. 'The Plague', translated into English as Pestilence) is perhaps his best known and has been translated into multiple languages including English, Dutch and German.

Unlike many Welsh-language writers, much of his writing deals with areas of history not directly related to Wales, for example, his 2001 novel Paradwys is about the Atlantic slave trade, and his 2008 novel, Petrograd, is set during the Russian Revolution. The latter went on to win the Wales Book of the Year award.

His work has been described as an example of the postmodern tradition.

His novels include:

- Bingo! (1985)
- Y Pla (1987)
- Hunangofiant (1990)
- Paradwys (2001)
- Peenemunde (2004)
- Cymru Fach (2006)
- Petrograd (2008)
- Cymru Fydd (2022)
