= Arthur Shearly Cripps =

- Born: 10 June 1869; Tunbridge Wells, Kent, England
- Died: 1 August 1952 (aged 83); Southern Rhodesia
- Other name: Mpandi
- Occupations: Missionary priest, activist, and writer.
- Known for: Mission work

Arthur Shearly Cripps (10 June 1869 – 1 August 1952) was an English-born Anglican priest, missionary, activist, short story writer, and poet who spent most of his life in Southern Rhodesia (now Zimbabwe).

== Biography ==
Cripps was born in Tunbridge Wells, Kent, and was educated at Charterhouse School and Trinity College, Oxford, where he read history. He then trained for the Anglican priesthood at Cuddesdon Theological College, coming under the influence of Charles Gore. From 1894 he held the parish Ford End in Essex.

A friend of Frank Weston, the leading Anglo Catholic priest who would become Bishop of Zanzibar he became a missionary for the Society for the Propagation of the Gospel, intending to work in Mashonaland, after reading criticism of the methods of Cecil Rhodes. From 1902 he had a parish near Enkeldoorn (now known as Chivhu) in what was then Southern Rhodesia.

He was in conflict with the British South Africa Company over land distribution, taking the side of the African population. He was given the Shona name Mpandi, or 'the man who walks like thunder'. After more than 20 years he returned to England for a time after a quarrel with the British administration; but went back shortly afterwards for the rest of his life, having in 1927 published Africa for Africans, on the land issue.

Arthur Cripps lived for some time in Manyene Communal Lands, about 120 km South of Harare, 20 km North of Chivhu. An area of Manyene is now known by the name he gave it when he established the mission work there, Maronda Mashanu, which means "The Five Wounds" in the local Shona language. Father Cripps was buried in the chancel of the church (now a ruin) at Maronda Mashanu.

Some people from the area believe that Arthur Cripps performed miracles. For example, there are claims that a white man who wanted to assault him for associating with Africans was crippled the moment he raised his hand. They claim that the man was only healed when Father Cripps prayed for him.

His great-great-nephew is the Welsh poet, Owen Sheers, who has written about him in the award-winning Dust Diaries (2004).

== Legacy ==
In his research on his great-great-uncle, Owen Sheers attended the annual memorial service at Cripps' grave.

“There were huge crowds of people dancing around the grave,” said Sheers. “It was fascinating that a missionary priest who had gone out there at the turn of the century in a period when the British were more or less the bad guys was still being honoured almost 50 years after his death."

There is also a road in Harare, Cripps Road, which some say is named after Arthur Cripps, although Owen Sheers' book indicates the naming was for another dignitary of the same name. The road leading from Chivhu to Cripps' former mission base is however named Cripps Road in his memory.

== Works ==
- Some Essex Verses (1930)
- Titania and Other Poems (1900)
- Primavera: Poems by Four Authors (1900)
- Jonathan: A Song of David (1902)
- The Black Christ (1902) poems
- Magic Casements (1905)
- Lyra Evangelistica: Missionary Verses of Mashonaland (1909)
- Faerylands Forlorn: African Tales (1910)
- The Two of Them Together: A Tale About Africa To-Day (1910)
- The Brooding Earth (1911) novel
- Pilgrimage of Grace, Verses on a Mission (1912)
- Bay-Tree Country (1913) novel
- A Martyr's Servant (1915) novel
- A Martyr's Heir (1916) novel
- Pilgrim's Joy Verses (1916)
- Lake and War: African Land and Water Verses (1917)
- Cinderella in the South: South African Tales (1918)
- An Africa for Africans: A Plea on Behalf of Territorial Segregation Areas and Their Freedom in a Southern African Colony (1927)
- Africa: Verses (1939)
