= Gwalia in Khasia =

1995 travelogue by Nigel Jenkins

- Cover of the second edition (1996)
- Author: Nigel Jenkins
- Language: English
- Published: 1995
- Publisher: Gomer
- Publication place: Wales
- Media type: Print
- Pages: 342
- ISBN: 9781859021842

Gwalia in Khasia is a 1995 travelogue by Welsh author Nigel Jenkins. Published by Gomer, it won the Wales Book of the Year in 1996.

== Synopsis ==
Gwalia in Khasia tells the story of the Welsh Calvinistic Methodists' Mission to the Khasi Hills in north-east India between 1841 and 1969. Three different narrative strands interweave throughout the book: the first being the life and work of Thomas Jones (1810–1849) of Montgomeryshire: the first Calvinist Methodist missionary to reach the hills in April 1841. Jones became a Calvinistic Methodist minister in 1840, and shortly afterwards set out for India with his wife Anne. His practical skills were valued by the Khasi community, and he learned their language by living among them. Jones recorded the Khasi language in Roman script, and the inscription on his gravestone in the Scottish Cemetery in Kolkata calls him "the founding father of the Khasi alphabet and literature". He was expelled from the church in 1847 for, amongst other things, involving himself in the commercial venture of farming. As a result of his criticisms of a local industrialist, Harry Inglis, Jones was later forced to leave the Khasi hills. During his escape through the jungle he contracted malaria, and died on 16 September 1849.

The second narrative strand in Gwalia in Khasia is the tale of the mission in the time after Thomas Jones, including the impact of the 1897 Assam earthquake, which destroyed most of the mission buildings but also drove hundreds of Khasis into the arms of the Church. This narrative strand wraps up in 1969, when the remaining missionaries left India.

The third strand is the account of Jenkins' own travels in the Khasi hills during the early 1990s.

== Reception ==
In 1996, Gwalia in Khasia won the Wales Book of the Year award. In 2002, the book was republished in India by Penguin under the title Through The Green Door: Travels Among the Khasis.

In the obituary for Jenkins published in The Independent in 2014, Meic Stephens noted that Gwalia in Khasia "was compared by competent critics to the work of such travel-writers as Jan Morris and Paul Theroux."

== Documentaries ==
The story of the Welsh mission to the Khasi hills detailed in Gwalia in Khasia was also the subject of two television documentaries, both written and presented by Jenkins. The first was Gwalia yng Nghasia, a three-part Welsh-language documentary series for S4C, which aired during March and April 1994. The second was a one-hour documentary for BBC Wales, this time in the English language, which aired a year later in 1995.

== Khasia in Gwalia ==
Jenkins also edited an accompanying anthology of poetry and prose from the Khasi Hills, entitled Khasia in Gwalia. The first collection of Khasi literature to appear in the West, it featured the writing of Desmond L. Kharmawphlang, Robin S. Ngangom, Lealle Hardinge Pde, Kynpham Singh Nongkynrlh and Gweneth Alicia Mawlong. Released by Alun Books in June 1995, the anthology was published to coincide with a tour of Wales by the five writers involved, who were joined on tour by three Khasi musicians: Brek Wansett, Jurimon Risaw and Sanjarawain Risaw. All of the poems appeared in the anthology their original languages of either Khasi or English, with the poems in Khasi translated by the poets into English and some poems additionally translated into Welsh by the poet Dafydd Rowlands.
