= Catrin Kean =

Welsh writer

- Occupation: Writer
- Writing career
- Genre: Fiction
- Notable work: Salt (2020)
- Notable awards: Wales Book of the Year, 2021

Catrin Kean or Catrin Clarke is a Welsh writer. Her debut novel Salt won the Wales Book of the Year in 2021. Writing under the pen name Catrin Clarke, she won a BAFTA Cymru award for screenwriting in 2003 for her work on the BBC Wales drama Belonging.

== Early life ==
Kean was born in Wales, and is of Welsh, Irish, English and Bajan heritage. She is based in Cardiff.

== Career ==
Kean is a scriptwriter who has written for film, television and radio, with credits including Casualty, Mistresses and Wolfblood. In 2016, she became a Hay Festival Writer at Work, a new long-term development programme for selected writers born, living and/or educated in Wales. Kean was one of the first cohort of writers, and completed a 10-day residency at the festival in 2016, 2017 and 2018.

Kean's first novel Salt was published by Gomer Press in 2020. The novel tells the story of the author's Welsh great-grandmother Ellen meeting and marrying her great-grandfather Samuel, a ship’s cook from Barbados, in 1878 and subsequently travelling with him at sea. Dealing with themes of racism, class and British hegemony, Salt was praised by Nation.Cymru as 'a novel for our times' in light of the Black Lives Matter movement, while Wales Arts Review called it 'a gripping love story of significant cultural importance...set against the intergenerational, inherited trauma caused by slavery and colonialism.' At the 2021 Wales Book of the Year Awards, Salt won the 'triple crown': taking the Rhys Davies Trust Fiction Award, the Wales Arts Review People's Choice Award and the overall prize for Wales Book of the Year. Lace, Kean's second novel and the sequel to Salt, was published by Honno in 2024.

== Bibliography ==
=== Novels ===
- Salt (2020)
- Lace (2024)

=== Short fiction ===
- Dust. Vol. 8. Riptide. 2013. p. 81. ISBN 9780955832666.
- Blue. Vol. 5. The Ghastling. February 2017. pp. 46–49. ISBN 9780993499128.
- Birdcage. Vol. 7. The Ghastling. April 2018. pp. 65–70. ISBN 9780993499142.
- Fogtime. Vol. 8. The Ghastling. October 2018. pp. 56–58. ISBN 9780993499159.
- Sirens. Vol. 10. The Ghastling. October 2019. pp. 56–61. ISBN 9780993499180.
