= Sheenagh Pugh =

British poet, novelist and translator (born 1950)

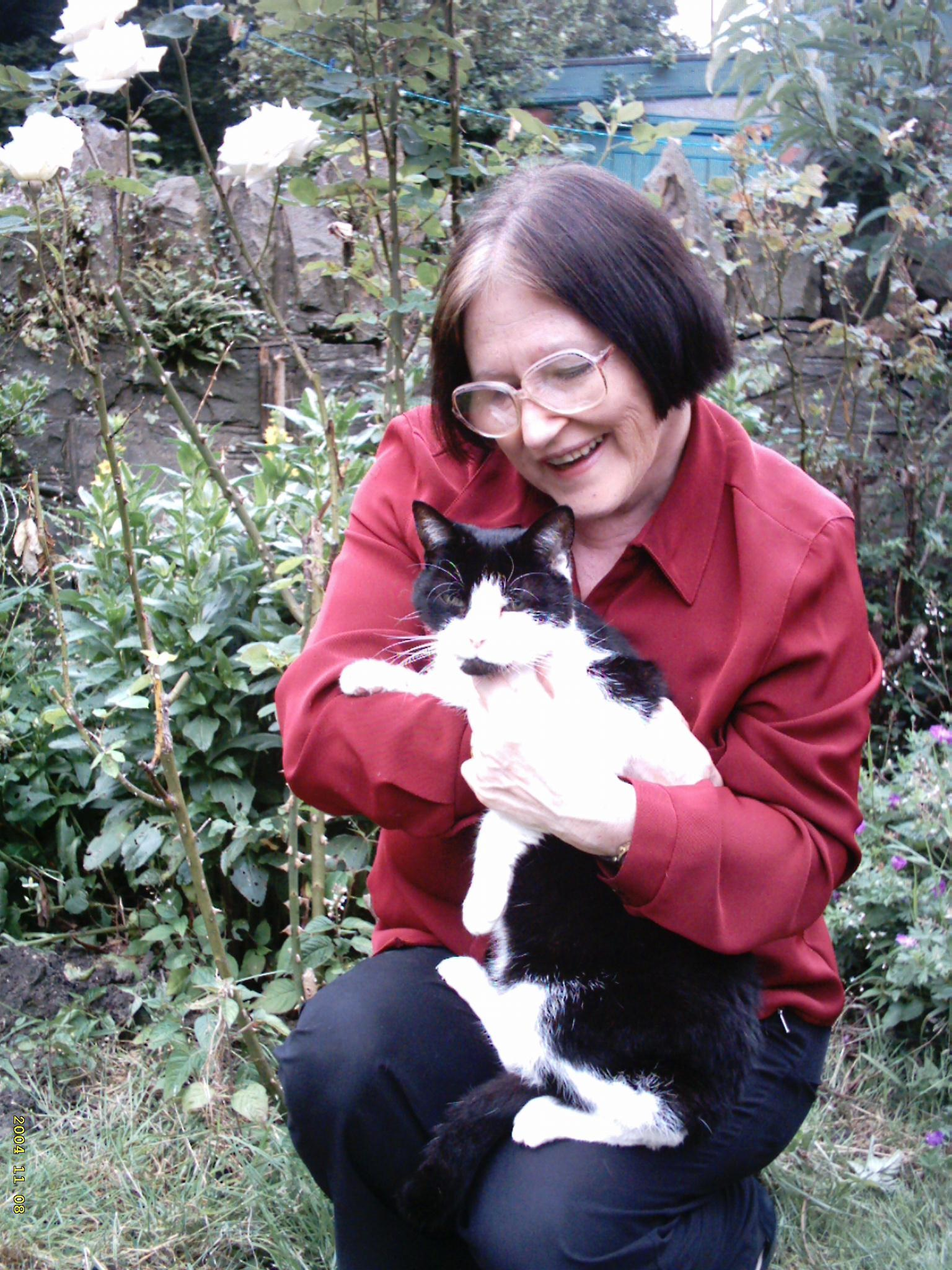
- Pugh in 2008
- Born: 20 December 1950 (age 75); Birmingham, England
- Occupations: Poet, novelist, translator
- Writing career
- Language: English
- Period: 1977–
- Notable work: Stonelight (2000)
- Notable awards: Wales Book of the Year, 2000
- Website: www.sheenagh.wixsite.com/sheenaghpugh

Sheenagh Pugh (born 20 December 1950) is a British poet, novelist and translator who writes in English. Her book, Stonelight (1999) won the Wales Book of the Year award.

Pugh was born in Birmingham. She was a creative writer educator at the University of Glamorgan until her retirement. She has written several poetry collections, and two novels. She has also written The Democratic Genre: fan fiction in a literary context (2005), a literary study of fan fiction.

== Life ==
Pugh was born in Birmingham. She studied languages at the University of Bristol. She now lives in Shetland but lived for many years in Cardiff and taught creative writing at the University of Glamorgan until retiring in 2008. Her collection of poetry, Stonelight (1999) won the Wales Book of the Year award in 2000. She has twice won the Cardiff International Poetry Competition. Her collection of poetry The Beautiful Lie (Seren, 2002) was shortlisted for the Whitbread Prize and the collection The Movement of Bodies (Seren, 2005) was selected as a Poetry Book Society recommendation and also shortlisted for the T. S. Eliot Prize.

Pugh's interest in northern landscapes is well-known and a strong feature of her work. One of her novels, Kirstie's Witnesses, is set in Shetland and several poems in Long-Haul Travellers are set in Norway.

Her poem "Sometimes" (Selected Poems, 1990) appeared in Poems on the Underground and is among her best-known works, though Pugh herself states on her website that she "long ago got sick of it" and no longer allows it to be anthologised or used in examination questions. Politically correct versions of this poem using inclusive language have been published, ruining the scansion and raising Pugh's ire.

Pugh has also published a study of fan fiction, The Democratic Genre: fan fiction in a literary context (Seren, 2005), which is one of the first publications to treat fan fiction as a literary rather than a sociological phenomenon. Fandom is also the subject of her 'Fanfic' sequence, in the collection The Beautiful Lie, which includes a poem about Mary Sues.

Pugh's collection Long-Haul Travellers was published by Seren in Autumn 2008. It features several poems set in Norway and a sequence about the Dutch privateer turned Barbary pirate Murat Reis. Long-Haul Travellers was shortlisted for the Roland Mathias Prize and longlisted for the Wales Book of the Year prize. Pugh has since published Short Days, Long Shadows in 2014 and Afternoons Go Nowhere, 2019, both from Seren.

== Works ==
=== Poetry ===
- Crowded by Shadows (1977)
- What a Place to Grow Flowers (1979)
- Earth Studies and Other Voyages (1982)
- Beware Falling Tortoises (1987)
- Sing for the Taxman (1993)
- Id's Hospit (1997)
- Stonelight (1999)
- The Beautiful Lie (2002)
- The Movement of Bodies (2005)
- Long-Haul Travellers (2008)
- Later Selected Poems (2009)
- Short Days, Long Shadows (2014)
- Afternoons Go Nowhere (2019)

=== Poetry anthologies ===
- Selected Poems (1990)
- What If This Road and Other Poems (2003)

=== Novels ===
- Kirstie's Witnesses (1998)
- Folk Music (1999)

=== Translation ===
- Prisoners of Transience (1985)

=== Nonfiction ===
- The Democratic Genre (2005)

All published by Seren except Kirstie's Witnesses, published by the Shetland Publishing Company, and What If This Road and Other Poems, published by Gwasg Carreg Gwalch.
