= Encyclopaedia of Wales =

2008 single-volume encyclopedia

The Welsh Academy Encyclopaedia of Wales, published in January 2008, is a single-volume-publication encyclopaedia about Wales. The Welsh-language edition, entitled Gwyddoniadur Cymru is regarded as the most ambitious encyclopaedic work to be published in Welsh since the 19th century. The English-language and Welsh-language editions were published simultaneously.

== Background ==
Unlike the Welsh Encyclopedia, published in ten volumes, between 1854 and 1879, by Thomas Gee, the encyclopaedia is about only Wales. In this respect it is more like the Cymru: Yn Hanesyddol, Parthedegol, A Bywgraphyddol ("Wales: Historical, Regional, & Biographical"), edited by Owen Jones and published between 1871 and 1875.

The encyclopaedia indexes 6,000 facts about Wales compiled by 400 researchers over ten years. Biographical articles are restricted to individuals no longer living. The editors are John Davies (consultant editor for both versions), Menna Baines (editor of the Welsh language version), Nigel Jenkins (editor of the English version) and Peredur Lynch. The project was started in January 1999 and the book eventually published January 2008, although 14 November 2007 was the original launch date.

Funding for the project, which cost £300,000, came from the Literature Wales (formerly known as "the Academi"), University of Wales Press and also from the Arts Council of Wales lottery funding.

Publishers claim they have included facts from every community in Wales. Ashley Drake of the University of Wales said that it is a "celebration of Wales and Welshness. With everything you could think of about Wales in [the encyclopaedia]," adding "Every town, every village, every city is mentioned in there," and including famous people in the fields of science, religion, politics, popular culture, amongst others.

== Facts about the encyclopedia ==
- Total number of words - Welsh edition: 838,152; English edition: 787,693.
- Total number of articles: over 5,000.
- Number of pages - Welsh edition: 1,112; English edition: 1,088.
- Number of contributors: 374.
- Printed in Malta.

== Coverage and criticism ==
The encyclopaedia's content includes a number of Welsh "firsts", as well as key facts, such as: the equals sign was created by Welshman Robert Recorde of Tenby in the 1540s; Felinfoel was the first brewery to can beer in Europe; the nearest point between Wales and Ireland is the lighthouse on Strumble Head; Wales' largest metal dragon is in Newport; Newtown had the first mail order service in Great Britain; The world's tallest mountain was named after Welshman Sir George Everest; Swansea is the wettest city in Great Britain; the world's rarest apple was discovered on Bardsey Island in 2000; Wales produces more energy than it consumes.

Some reviewers have suggested that the choice of subjects, and how some articles related to politics are worded, is not completely balanced, and that there should be more coverage of the role of the British labour movement. The encyclopedia's price, £65, has been criticised as placing it out of reach of many potential buyers. The Literature Wales website responded to this: "A book that every Welsh family, whose heritage is close to their hearts, has a copy of – that is how we have defined the Welsh Academy encyclopaedia of Wales." In her report on BBC Wales Today, on 12 July 2007, correspondent Caroline Evans said: "It is a long way from the infamous entry in an index of a 19th-century encyclopaedia which read 'For Wales, See England'."

== See also ==
- Encyclopaedia Cambrensis
