= Ailbhe Darcy =

Irish poet

- Born: Ailbhe Darcy; 1981 (age 44–45); Dublin, Ireland
- Education: University College Dublin; University of Notre Dame
- Notable work: Insistence (2018)
- Awards: Wales Book of the Year (2019)

Ailbhe Darcy (born 1981) is an Irish poet and Wales Book of the Year award laureate.

== Biography ==
Ailbhe Darcy was born in 1981 and grew up in Dublin, Ireland. In 2015, she was awarded an MFA and a PhD from the University of Notre Dame. She won the 2019 Wales Book of the Year and the Pigott Poetry Prize at the 2019 Listowel Writers' Week with her collection Insistence, which was also shortlisted for the T. S. Eliot Prize and the Irish Times Poetry Now Award.

Darcy is a Reader in Creative Writing at Cardiff University.

Darcy lives in Cardiff.

== Bibliography ==
=== Poetry ===
- A Fictional Dress (Tall Lighthouse, 2009)
- —— (2011). Imaginary Menagerie. Bloodaxe. ISBN 9781852249014.
- ——; Fowler, SJ (2017). Subcritical Tests. Gorse Editions. ISBN 9780992804787.
- —— (2018). Insistence. Bloodaxe. ISBN 9781780370781.

=== Prose ===
- A History of Irish Women's Poetry (co-edited with David Wheatley, Cambridge University Press, 2021)
- Virtuosity: Risk and Excess in Poetic Form (Cambridge University Press, 2026)
