= Elinor Wyn Reynolds =

Welsh poet and writer (born 1970)

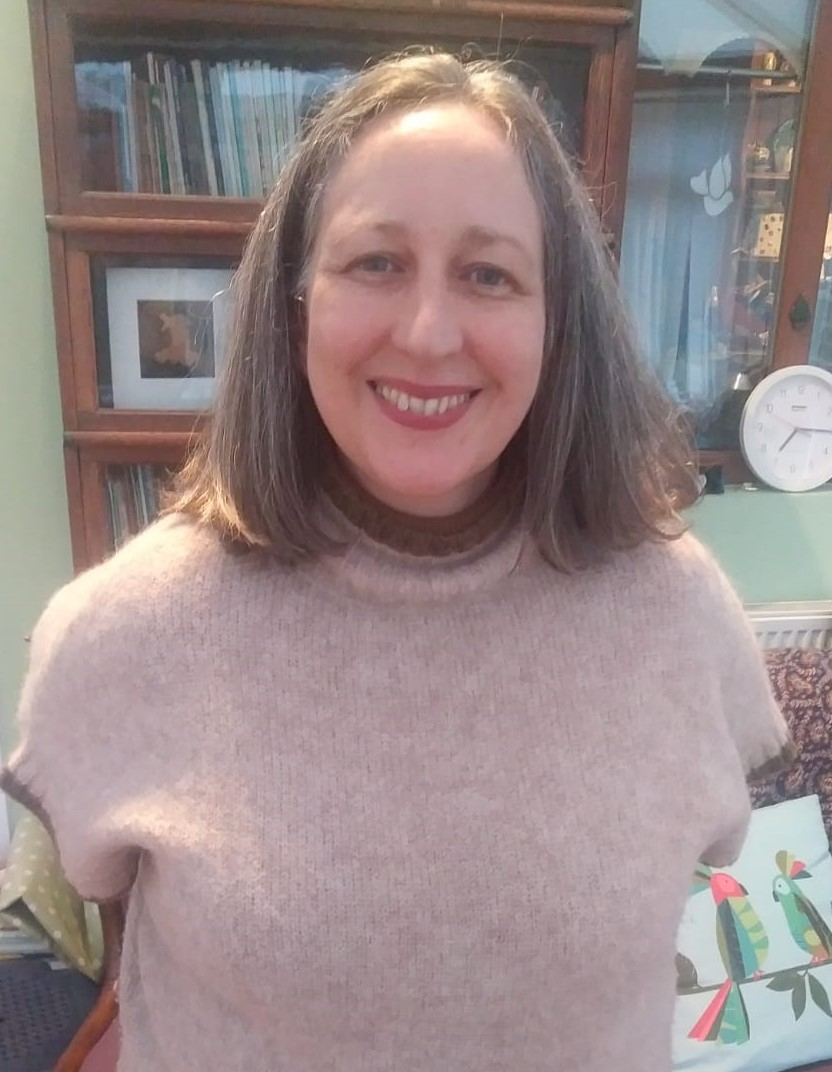
- Reynolds in 2024
- Born: March 24, 1970 (age 56); Treorchy, Rhondda Valley, Wales
- Education: University of Wales, Aberystwyth; Jesus College, Oxford
- Writing career
- Notable work: Anwyddoldeb
- Notable awards: Wales Book of the Year (2023)

Elinor Wyn Reynolds (born 24 March 1970) is a Welsh poet, writer and editor. She won Wales Book of the Year in the poetry category in 2023 and was short-listed in the fiction category in 2020. In 2025, she became the first woman to be appointed General Secretary of the Union of Welsh Independents.

== Early life ==
Elinor Wyn Roberts was born in Treorchy, and grew up in Carmarthen, Wales. She studied at University of Wales, Aberystwyth and Jesus College, Oxford.

== Career ==
=== Writer ===
In 2004, she took part in a rap battle event between poets and rappers in Newport as part of the Eisteddfod.

Elinor Wyn Reynolds' first novel, Gwirionedd, was published in 2019, and shortlisted for Wales Book of the Year in 2020. She won Wales Book of the Year in the poetry category for her book Anwyddoldeb in 2023.

She was a judge at the Urdd Eisteddfod in 2019, and an adjudicator at the National Eisteddfod 2023.

In June 2026, she was part of an event celebrating the 50th anniversary of Geraint Jarman’s album Gobaith Mawr y Ganrif.

She is a regular contributor to programs on Radio Wales.

=== Union of Welsh Independents ===
She worked for eight years as a publications officer and assistant to the General Secretary for the Union of Welsh Independents in Carmarthen.

In 2025, she was elected General Secretary of the Union of Welsh Independents, succeeding Revd Dyfrig Rees after seven years in the job. She is the first woman to hold this position and the first layperson for a hundred years to be appointed to the role. The position is elected by a vote of churches and individuals.

== Personal life ==
By 2022, she had been living in Carmarthen with her family for many years after previously living in various places around Wales, including Cardigan.

She is a member of Priordy Church, Carmarthen.

== Bibliography ==
- Gwirionedd (Bwthyn, 2019)
- Anwyddoldeb (Barddas, 2022)
