= To Babel and Back =

- Cover of the first edition (2005)
- Author: Robert Minhinnick
- Language: English
- Published: 2005
- Publisher: Seren
- Publication place: Wales
- Media type: Print
- Pages: 192
- ISBN: 9781854114013

To Babel and Back is a collection of essays by Welsh author Robert Minhinnick. Published by Seren in 2005, it won the Wales Book of the Year in 2006.

== Synopsis ==
To Babel and Back is a collection of essays covering a variety of topics and referring to various places and people in different parts of the world. Part travel documentary, part dream-narrative, topics include the use of uranium in modern weapons; Iraq under the government of Saddam Hussein; and the discovery of the alleged site of the Tower of Babel. Travelling across the world from Berlin to New York via Buenos Aires, Minhinnick returns to his native Wales to consider how his country compares.

== Reception ==
In 2006, To Babel and Back won the Wales Book of the Year award. This was an award that Minhinnick had won previously in 1993 for his collection of essays Watching the fire-eater. In 2018, he received a record third Wales Book of the Year award for his poetry collection Diary of the Last Man.
