= Robert Minhinnick =

Welsh poet, essayist, novelist and translator

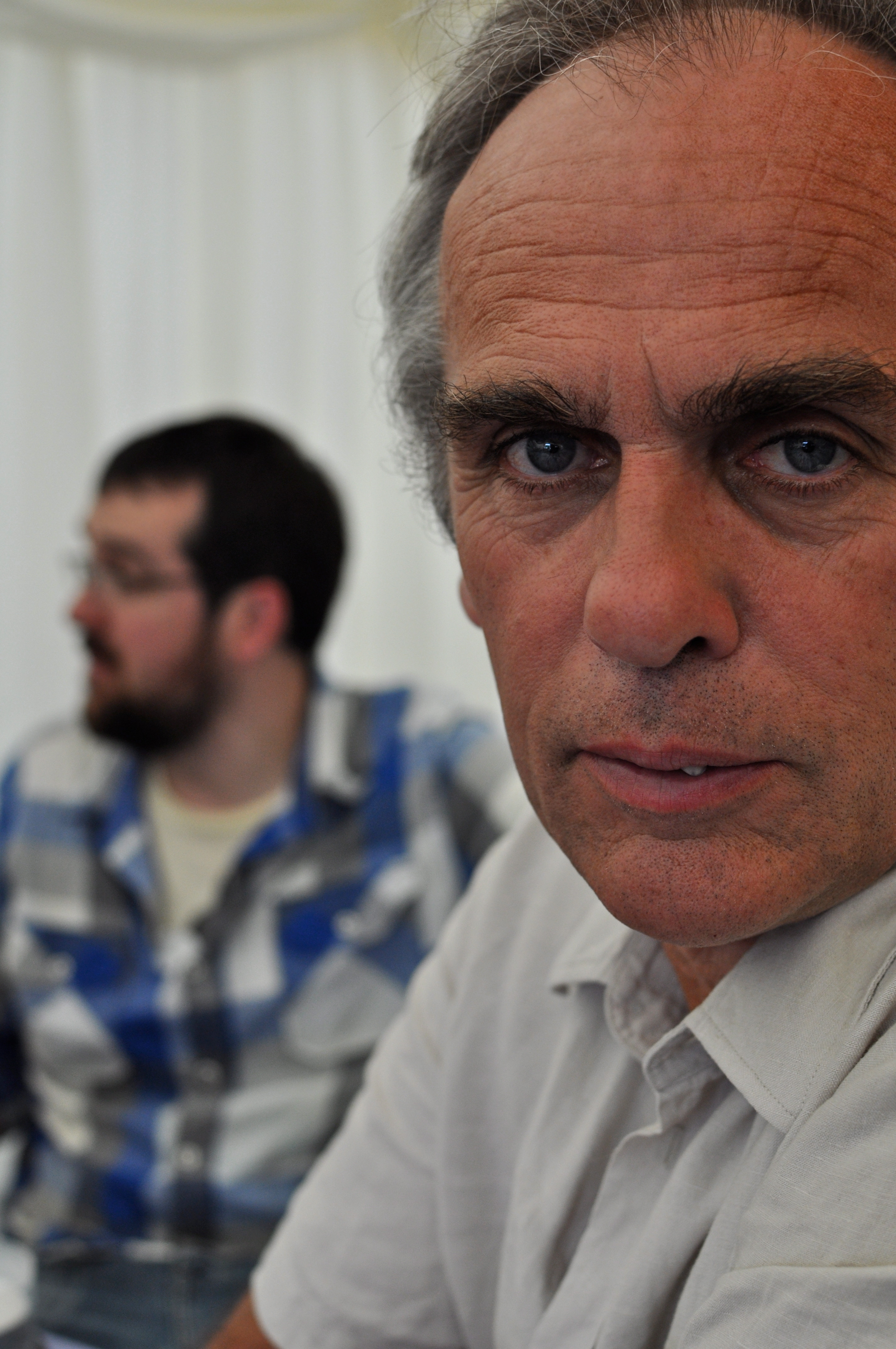
- Minhinnick in 2010
- Born: 12 August 1952 (age 74); Neath, Wales
- Education: University of Wales, Aberystwyth; Cardiff University
- Occupations: Poet; essayist; novelist; translator
- Writing career
- Period: 1998–
- Notable works: Watching the fire-eater (1992); To Babel and Back (2005); Diary of the Last Man (2017)
- Notable awards: Eric Gregory Award, 1980; Wales Book of the Year, 1993; Cholmondeley Award, 1998; Forward Prize, 1999; Forward Prize, 2003; Wales Book of the Year, 2006; Wales Book of the Year, 2018

Robert Minhinnick (born 12 August 1952) is a Welsh poet, essayist, novelist and translator. He has won two Forward Prizes for Best Individual Poem and has received the Wales Book of the Year award a record three times (in 1993, 2006 and 2018).

== Biography ==
Minhinnick was born in Neath, and now lives in Porthcawl. He studied at University of Wales, Aberystwyth, and University of Wales, Cardiff. An environmental campaigner, he co-founded the charities Friends of the Earth (Cymru) and Sustainable Wales. His work deals with both Welsh and international themes.

He has published seven poetry collections and several volumes of essays. He edited the magazine, Poetry Wales from 1997 until 2008. He has also translated poems from contemporary Welsh poets for an anthology, The Adulterer's Tongue. His first novel, Sea Holly, was published in autumn 2007.

== Awards ==
Minhinnick won the Forward Prize for Best Individual Poem in 1999 for 'Twenty-five Laments for Iraq', and again in 2003 for 'The Fox in the National Museum of Wales'. His poem ‘The Castaway’ was also shortlisted in 2004. He has also won an Eric Gregory Award (1980) and a Cholmondeley Award (1998), both awarded by the Society of Authors to British poets.

Minhinnick has won the English-language Wales Book of the Year award a record three times: in 1993 for his essay collection Watching the fire-eater, in 2006 for his essay collection To Babel and Back and in 2018 for his poetry collection Diary of the Last Man. His win with Diary of the Last Man in 2018 also meant that Minhinnick had received the award in each of the three decades of its existence.

== Works ==
=== Poetry ===
- The Yellow Palm (1998)
- A Thread in the Maze Christopher Davies, 1978 ISBN 071540444X
- Native Ground Triskele, 1979, ISBN 9780904652048
- Life Sentences Poetry Wales Press, 1983, ISBN 9780907476177
- The Dinosaur Park Poetry Wales, 1985, ISBN 9780907476481
- The Looters Seren, 1989, ISBN 9781854110190
- Hey Fatman Seren, 1994, ISBN 9781854111104
- Selected Poems Carcanet, 1999, ISBN 9781857543834
- After the Hurricane Carcanet, 2002
- King Driftwood Carcanet Press, 2008, ISBN 9781857549652
- After the Stealth Bomber
- New Selected Poems, Carcanet, 2012, ISBN 9781847771339
- Diary of the Last Man, Carcanet, 2017

=== Novels ===
- Sea Holly Seren, 2007, ISBN 9781854114358
- Limestone Man Seren Books, 2015, ISBN 9781781722497

=== Short stories ===
- The Keys of Babylon (2011) Seren Press

=== Essays ===
- Watching the fire-eater Seren Books, 1992, ISBN 9781854110756
- The Green Agenda: Essays on The Environment of Wales (ed.) (1994) Seren Press
- Badlands (Seren, 1996, ISBN 9781854111579
- To Babel and Back (2005)

=== Translation ===
- The Adulterer's Tongue: Six Welsh Poets: A Facing-Text Anthology (ed., transl.) (2003)
