= The Element of Water =

2001 novel by Stevie Davies

- Author: Stevie Davies
- Language: English
- Published: 2001
- Publisher: The Women's Press
- Media type: Print
- Pages: 253
- ISBN: 9781912681150

The Element of Water is a 2001 novel by Welsh author Stevie Davies. Published by The Women's Press, it was longlisted for the Booker Prize in 2001, and for the Orange Women's Prize for Fiction in 2002; it won the Wales Book of the Year in 2002. The Element of Water was republished by Parthian in 2018 as part of the Library of Wales series.

== Synopsis ==
It is 1958: Isolde Dahl is a young teacher who goes to work in a British school on the shores of Lake Plön in north-west Germany. She is returning to a country she fled as a child refugee with her mother, Renate. Her father has disappeared into the chaos of a continent ravaged by war. Isolde has grown up in a Wales both strange and familiar.

1945, Lake Plön. Michael Quantz is an officer in what is left of a shattered German military command as they stage a last chaotic stand before the Allied armies in the final days of the World War II. Everyone has secrets. Michael wants to survive: his wife and son may still be alive. He will hide, change, become a teacher of music.

As Isolde and Michael meet on the shores of a German lake, the choices they have made and the stories they have told will change their lives again.

== Reception ==
Following its release, The Element of Water was longlisted for both the Booker Prize and the Orange Prize. Writing in The Observer, A. L. Kennedy chose it as her 'favourite read' of the year, calling it "a wonderful book set around the end of the Second World War and it deals deftly with issues of memory, guilt, love and responsibility." In 2002, The Element of Water won the Wales Book of the Year award.
