= Stevie Davies =

Welsh novelist, essayist and short story writer

- Born: Salisbury, England
- Education: University of Manchester
- Occupation: Writer
- Writing career
- Language: English
- Period: 1978–
- Notable work: The Element of Water (2001)
- Notable awards: Wales Book of the Year, 2002
- Website: www.steviedavies.com

Stevie Davies is a Welsh novelist, essayist and short story writer. She was elected a fellow of the Royal Society of Literature in 1998, and is also a fellow of the Welsh Academy. Her novel The Element of Water was longlisted for the Booker Prize in 2001, and won the Wales Book of the Year in 2002.

== Early life ==
Stevie Davies was born in Salisbury, England, but lived in Wales from when she was a week old. The Davies family lived in Morriston, a large town located within the city of Swansea. The only child of an RAF officer, Davies left Wales at the age of two and spent a nomadic childhood in Egypt, Germany and Scotland in the 1950s. After studying at the University of Manchester, Davies went on to lecture in the English department there.

== Career ==
Davies has published widely in the fields of fiction, literary criticism, biography and popular history. Her non-fiction work includes titles on the Brontë family, John Milton and Henry Vaughan. Davies' first novel, Boy Blue, was published by The Women's Press in 1987, and won the Fawcett Society Book Prize later that year. In 2001, Davies' novel The Element of Water was longlisted for the Booker Prize. It went on to win the 2002 Arts Council of Wales Book of the Year award.

== Personal life ==
Davies has three grown children, a son and two daughters. She is Professor of Creative Writing at Swansea University, and lives in Mumbles.

== Publications ==
=== Fiction ===
- 2020: The Party Wall, Honno
- 1987: Boy Blue, The Women's Press
- 1990: Primavera, The Women's Press
- 1992: Arms and the Girl, The Women's Press
- 1994: Closing the Book, The Women's Press
- 1996: Four Dreamers and Emily, The Women's Press
- 1997: The Web of Belonging, The Women's Press
- 1999: Impassioned Clay, The Women's Press
- 2001: The Element of Water, The Women's Press
- 2004: Kith & Kin, Weidenfeld & Nicolson
- 2007: The Eyrie, Weidenfeld & Nicolson
- 2010: Into Suez, Parthian
- 2013: Awakening, Parthian
- 2016: Equivocator, Parthian
- 2017: Arrest Me, for I Have Run Away, Parthian

=== Non-fiction ===
- 1978: Renaissance Views of Man, Manchester University Press
- 1983: Emily Brontë: The Artist as a Free Woman, Carcanet
- 1983: Images of Kingship in Paradise Lost: Milton's Politics and Christian Liberty, University of Missouri Press
- 1986: The Idea of Woman in Renaissance English Literature: The Feminine Reclaimed, The Harvester Press (also published as: The Feminine Reclaimed: The Idea of Woman in Spenser, Shakespeare and Milton, The University Press of Kentucky)
- 1988: Emily Brontë – Key Women Writers Series, Harvester Press
- 1989: Virginia Woolf's To the Lighthouse, Penguin Critical Studies
- 1991: Milton – New Readings Series, Harvester Wheatsheaf
- 1993: Shakespeare's Twelfth Night, Penguin Critical Studies
- 1994: Emily Brontë: Heretic, The Women's Press
- 1994: John Donne – Writers and their Work, New Series, Northcote House (in association with the British Council)
- 1995: Shakespeare's The Taming of the Shrew, Penguin Critical Studies
- 1995: Henry Vaughan, Seren
- 1998: Emily Brontë – Writers and Their Work, New Series, Northcote House (in association with the British Council)
- 1998: Unbridled Spirits: Women of the English Revolution 1640 – 1660, The Women's Press
- 2001: A Century of Troubles: England 1600 – 1700, Channel 4 Books

=== As editor ===
- 1976: The Brontë Sisters: Selected Poems, Carcanet
- 2003: Dreams and Other Aggravations: Selected Poems by Carla Lane, Earth Ventures
