= 2002–03 in Welsh football =

Major events in welsh football from 2002-2003

This article lists major events during the 2002-03 season in Welsh football.

== Welsh Cup ==
Barry Town beat Cwmbran Town in penalties in the Welsh Cup Final; the score after extra time was 2-2.

== Welsh League Cup ==
Rhyl beat Bangor City 4–3 in penalties in the final of the Welsh League Cup. The score after extra time was 2-2.

== Welsh Premier League ==
- Champions Barry Town
- Relegated to Welsh Football League Division One : Llanelli

== Welsh Football League Division One ==
- Champions: Bettws - did not apply for promotion to Welsh Premier League

== Cymru Alliance League ==
- Champions: Porthmadog - promoted to Welsh Premier League
