= Wales Book of the Year =

Annual Welsh literary award

- Awarded for: Best Welsh and English language works by Welsh or Welsh interest authors
- Location: Cardiff, Wales
- Country: Wales
- Presented by: Literature Wales
- First award: 1992
- Website: literaturewales.org/our-projects/wales-book-year

The Wales Book of the Year is a Welsh literary award given annually to the best Welsh and English language works in the fields of fiction and literary criticism by Welsh or Welsh interest authors. Established in 1992, the awards are currently administered by Literature Wales, and supported by the Arts Council of Wales, Welsh Government and the Welsh Books Council.

== Competition format ==
The longlist of ten works in each language is published in April and the shortlist of three works in each language at the Hay Festival in May. The winners are announced in June or July. Since 2006, the winners have each received £10,000. From 2007, four runners-up (two in each language) also each receive £1000. In 2009, Media Wales sponsored a voted "People's Choice" award for the English-language works.

The format was again changed in 2012, expanding the entries to three categories, fiction, creative non-fiction and poetry; with English and Welsh language winners in each field. In 2019, a sub-category for books for children and young people was added, to be awarded from the 2020 award onwards. An overall winner in each language is still chosen.

Regarding eligibility, the competition specifically excludes self-published authors. The Welsh national book award therefore differs from Ireland's national book award, since the latter does not preclude self-published titles from being nominated.

== English language winners ==
Year	Author	Title	Genre	Publisher	Ref.
1992	Emyr Humphreys	Bonds of Attachment	Fiction	Macdonald/Sphere	
1993	Robert Minhinnick	Watching the Fire Eater	Non-fiction	Seren	
1994	Paul Ferris	Caitlin: The Life of Caitlin Thomas	Non-fiction	Hutchinson	
1995	Duncan Bush	Masks	Poetry	Seren	
1996	Nigel Jenkins	Gwalia in Khasia	Non-fiction	Gomer	
1997	Siân James	Not Singing Exactly	Fiction	Honno	
1998	Mike Jenkins	Wanting to Belong	Fiction	Seren	
1999	Emyr Humphreys	The Gift of a Daughter	Fiction	Seren	
2000	Sheenagh Pugh	Stonelight	Poetry	Seren	
2001	Stephen Knight	Mr Schnitzel	Fiction	Viking	
2002	Stevie Davies	The Element of Water	Fiction	The Women's Press	
2003	Charlotte Williams	Sugar and Slate	Non-fiction	Planet	
2004	Niall Griffiths	Stump	Fiction	Jonathan Cape	
2005	Owen Sheers	The Dust Diaries	Non-fiction	Faber and Faber	
2006	Robert Minhinnick	To Babel and Back	Fiction	Seren	
2007	Lloyd Jones	Mr Cassini	Fiction	Seren	
2008	Dannie Abse	The Presence	Non-fiction	Hutchinson	
2009	Deborah Kay Davies	Grace, Tamar and Laszlo the Beautiful	Fiction	Parthian	
2010	Philip Gross	I Spy Pinhole Eye	Poetry	Cinnamon	
2011	John Harrison	Cloud Road	Non-fiction	Parthian	
2012	Patrick McGuinness	The Last Hundred Days	Fiction	Seren	
2013	Rhian Edwards	Clueless Dogs	Poetry	Seren	
2014	Owen Sheers	Pink Mist	Poetry	Faber and Faber	
2015	Patrick McGuinness	Other People's Countries	Non-fiction	Jonathan Cape	
2016	Thomas Morris	We Don't Know What We're Doing	Fiction	Faber and Faber	
2017	Alys Conran	Pigeon	Fiction	Parthian	
2018	Robert Minhinnick	Diary of the Last Man	Poetry	Carcanet	
2019	Ailbhe Darcy	Insistence	Poetry	Bloodaxe Books	
2020	Niall Griffiths	Broken Ghost	Fiction	Jonathan Cape	
2021	Catrin Kean	Salt	Fiction	Gomer	
2022	Nadifa Mohamed	The Fortune Men	Fiction	Viking, Penguin Random House	
2023	Caryl Lewis	Drift	Fiction	Doubleday	
2024	Tom Bullough	Sarn Helen: A Journey Through Wales, Past, Present and Future	Non-fiction	Granta	
2025	Carys Davies	Clear	Fiction	Granta	
2026	Anthony Shapland	A Room Above a Shop	Fiction	Granta	

=== Creative non-fiction ===
- 2012: Richard Gwyn The Vagabond's Breakfast (Alcemi)
- 2014: Meic Stephens Rhys Davies: A Writer's Life
- 2016: Jasmine Donahaye Losing Israel (Seren)
- 2017: Peter Lord The Tradition (Parthian)

=== Roland Mathias Poetry Award ===
This award was discontinued in 2020.

- 2012 Gwyneth Lewis – Sparrow Tree (Bloodaxe Books)
- 2014 Owen Sheers – Pink Mist (Faber & Faber)
- 2015 Tiffany Atkinson – So Many Moving Parts (Bloodaxe Books)
- 2016 Philip Gross – Love Songs of Carbon (Bloodaxe Books)
- 2017 John Freeman - What Possessed Me? (Worple Press)
- 2019 Ailbhe Darcy, Insistence (Bloodaxe Books)

== Welsh language winners ==
=== Fiction Award ===
Fiction Award
Year	Author	Title	Publisher	Source
1992	Gerallt Lloyd Owen	Cilmeri	Gwasg Gwynedd	
1993	Robin Llywelyn	Seren Wen ar Gefndir Gwyn	Gomer	
1994	T. Robin Chapman	W.J Gruffydd	Gwasg Prifysgol Cymru	
1995	Aled Islwyn	Unigolion, Unigeddau	Gomer	
1996	Sonia Edwards	Glöynnod	Gwasg Gwynedd	
1997	Gerwyn Williams	Tir Neb: Rhyddiaith Gymraeg a’r Rhyfel Byd Cyntaf	Gwasg Prifysgol Cymru	
1998	Iwan Llwyd	Dan Ddylanwad	Gwasg Tâf	
1999	R. M. Jones	Ysbryd y Cwlwm: Delwedd y Genedl yn ein Llenyddiaeth	Gwasg Prifysgol Cymru	
2000	Gwyneth Lewis	Y Llofrudd Iaith	Cyhoeddiadau Barddas	
2001	Owen Martell	Cadw dy ffydd, brawd	Gomer	
2002	Graham Davies	Cadwyni Rhyddid	Cyhoeddiadau Barddas	
2003	Angharad Price	O! Tyn y Gorchudd	Gomer	
2004	Jerry Hunter	Llwch Cenhedoedd	Gwasg Carreg Gwalch	
2005	Caryl Lewis	Martha, Jac a Sianco	Y Lolfa	
2006	Rhys Evans	Gwynfor: Rhag Pob Brad	Y Lolfa	
2007	Llwyd Owen	Ffydd Gobaith Cariad	Y Lolfa	
2008	Gareth Miles	Y Proffwyd a'i Ddwy Jesebel	Hutchinson	
2009	Wiliam Owen Roberts	Petrograd	Cyhoeddiadau Barddas	
2010	John Davies	Cymru: Y 100 lle i'w gweld cyn marw	Y Lolfa	
2011	Ned Thomas	Bydoedd: Cofiant Cyfnod	Y Lolfa	
2012	Jon Gower	Y Storïwr	Gomer	
2013	Manon Steffan Ros	Blasu	Y Lolfa	
2014	Ioan Kidd	Dewis	Gomer	
2015	Gareth F. Williams	Awst yn Anogia	Gwasg Gwynedd	
2016	Caryl Lewis	Y Bwthyn	Y Lolfa	
2017	Caryl Lewis	Y Gwreiddyn	Y Lolfa	
2018	Catrin Dafydd	Gwales	Gwasg Carreg Gwalch	
2019	Manon Steffan Ros	Llyfr Glas Nebo	Y Lolfa	
2020	Ifan Morgan Jones	Babel	Y Lolfa	
2021	Megan Angharad Hunter	Tu ôl i'r awyr	Y Lolfa	
2022	Ffion Dafis	Mori	Y Lolfa	
2023	Llŷr Titus	Pridd	Gwasg y Bwthyn	
2024	Mari George	Sut i Ddofi Corryn	Sebra	
2025	Gwenno Gwilym	V + Fo	Gwasg y Bwthyn	
2026	Sonia Edwards	Tri	Gwasg y Bwthyn	

=== Creative non-fiction ===
- 2012: Allan James John Morris-Jones (Gwasg Prifysgol Cymru)
- 2013: Heini Gruffudd Yr Erlid (Y Lolfa)
- 2014: Alan Llwyd Bob: Cofiant R. Williams Parry 1884 – 1956 (Gomer)
- 2015: Llŷr Gwyn Lewis Rhyw Flodau Rhyfel (Y Lolfa)
- 2016: Gruffydd Aled Williams – Dyddiau Olaf Owain Glyndŵr (Y Lolfa)
- 2017: Idris Reynolds Cofio Dic (Gomer)
- 2018: Goronwy Wynne Blodau Cymru (Y Lolfa)
- 2019: Andrew Green Cymru mewn 100 Gwrthrych (Gomer)
- 2020: Alan Llwyd Byd Gwynn, Cofiant T. Gwynn Jones (Cyhoeddiadau Barddas)
- 2021: Hazel Walford Davies Cofiant Syr Owen Morgan Edwards (Gomer)
- 2022: Non Parry Paid â Bod Ofn (Y Lolfa)
- 2023: Gareth Evans-Jones Cylchu Cymru (Y Lolfa)
- 2024: Jane Aaron Cranogwen Gwasg Prifysgol Cymru
- 2025: Iola Ynyr – Camu (overall winner)
- 2026: Iestyn Tyne Y Cyfan a Fu Rhyngom Ni - Ar lwybrau 'Atgof' Prosser Rhys

=== Poetry Award ===
- 2012: Karen Owen Siarad Trwy’i Het (Cyhoeddiadau Barddas)
- 2013: Aneurin Karadog O Annwn i Geltia (Cyhoeddiadau Barddas)
- 2014: Christine James Rhwng y Llinellau (Cyhoeddiadau Barddas)
- 2015: Rhys Iorwerth Un Stribedyn Bach (Gwasg Carreg Gwalch)
- 2016: Mererid Hopwood Nes Draw (Gwasg Gomer)
- 2017: Aneurin Karadog Bylchau (Cyhoeddiadau Barddas)
- 2018: Hywel Griffiths Llif Coch Awst (Barddas)
- 2019: Alan Llwyd Cyrraedd a cherddi eraill (Barddas)
- 2020: Caryl Bryn Hwn ydy'r llais, tybad? (Cyhoeddiadau'r Stamp)
- 2021: Marged Tudur Mynd (Gomer)
- 2022: Grug Muse Merch y llyn (Cyhoeddiadau'r Stamp)
- 2023: Elinor Wyn Reynolds Anwyddoldeb (Cyhoeddiadau Barddas)
- 2024: Gruffudd Owen Mymryn Rhyddid (Cyhoeddiadau Barddas)
- 2025: Meleri Davies Rhuo ei distawrwydd hi (Cyhoeddiadau'r Stamp)
- 2026: Mererid Hopwood Mae (Cyhoeddiadau Barddas)

=== People's Choice Award ===
Year	Author	Title	Publisher	Source
2012	Karen Owen	Siarad trwy'i Het	Cyhoeddiadau Barddas	
2013	Llion Jones	Trydar Mewn Trawiadau	Cyhoeddiadau Barddas	
2014	Ioan Kidd	Dewis	Gomer	
2015	Lleucu Roberts	Saith Oes Efa	Y Lolfa	
2016				
2017	Guto Dafydd	Ymbelydredd	Y Lolfa	
2018	Peredur Lynch	Caeth a Rhydd	Gwasg Carreg Gwalch	
2019	Manon Steffan Ros	Llyfr Glas Nebo	Y Lolfa	
2020	Ifan Morgan Jones	Babel	Y Lolfa	
2021	Hazel Walford Davies	Cofiant Syr Owen Morgan Edwards	Gomer	
2022	Various	Y Pump	Y Lolfa	
2023	Gwenllian Ellis	Sgen i'm Syniad - Snogs, Secs, Sens	Y Lolfa	
2024	Iwan Rhys	Trothwy	Y Lolfa	
2025	Gwenno Gwilym	V + Fo	Gwasg y Bwthyn	
2026	Carwyn Eckley	Trochi	Gwasg Carreg Gwalch	
