= Dulce Pinzon =

Mexican artist (born 1974)

Dulce Pinzón
- Born: 1974 (age 51–52); Mexico City, Mexico
- Education: Universidad de Las Americas, Indiana University of Pennsylvania
- Occupations: Photographer, author
- Known for: fine arts photography, portraiture, environmental activism
- Notable work: The Real Story of the Superheroes
- Awards: Ford Foundation Grant, New York Foundation for the Arts Fellowship in Photography
- Website: www.dulce-pinzon.com

Dulce Pinzón (born 1974 in Mexico City, Mexico) is a Mexican artist currently living in Brooklyn, New York, Mexico City, Mexico, and Montreal, Canada. In 2015 she was named by Forbes Magazine as "One of the 50 most creative Mexicans in the world", and Vogue magazine identified her as one of the "8 Mexican female photographers who are breaking through at a global level." In 2020, the Voice of America characterized her as having "earned a prestigious place in the world of fine arts photography."

== Education ==
Pinzón studied Mass Media Communications at the Universidad de las Américas Puebla in Mexico, and Photography at Indiana University of Pennsylvania in the United States . She moved to New York City in 1995 and studied at the International Center of Photography. She lives and works in Mexico, Montreal, and New York.

== Photography ==
Pinzon's work is influenced by feelings of nostalgia, questions of identity, political, environmental, and cultural frustrations. The goal that she pursues through her art activism is cultural consumption, customization, and intervention. Some of her projects are: "Viviendo En El Gabacho"(a Spanish colloquialism for "foreign" which in Mexico is used as a Mexican colloquialism for "living in the United States"), "Loteria" (Lottery), "Multiracial", "Generosity", and "Real Stories of the Superheroes." Her work has been published and exhibited in Mexico, the United States, Australia, Latin America, Asia, and Europe.

=== The Real Story of the Superheroes ===
In 2006, Pinzón completed a project in which she photographed several immigrant workers in New York City dressed as superheroes who, like her, mostly originally came from the state of Puebla in Mexico. "They're so quiet and hard-working and invisible", Pinzón said of her subjects in a feature article in The New York Times in 2006. "I wanted to pay a tribute to them." Pinzón drew on her nostalgia for Mexicopop culture as a medium to get her views across to through her art.

This series consists of 20 color photographs of Mexican immigrants dressed in the costumes of well-known American and Mexican superheroes. Pinzón breaks down the photographs' titles into five sections which not only title the photographs, but also deliver biographical data about the subject. These sections are:

- Name of the superhero
- Name of the daily worker
- Name of their home country
- What the laborer does for a living
- And the amount of money that they send home.

One example of these "everyday superheroes" is the photograph titled "Noe Reyes. He sends hundreds of dollars back to Mexico every month." There are many undocumented workers from Puebla who reside in New York City and who work as dishwashers, deli workers, and cleaning women, etc. and whom are rarely recognized for their everyday acts of sacrifice and heroism in supporting their families in their countries of origin.

Another example is the story behind the photograph of Minerva Valencia, who dressed up as Catwoman for Dulce's artwork. Valencia came to New York from Puebla and works as a babysitter in New York. The amount of economic remittance that she sends back to Puebla, Mexico is four hundred dollars per week.

The New Yorker magazine photography critic Maria Lokke wrote about these images:

In Dulce Pinzon's “Superheroes” series, costumes are superimposed on working-class Mexicans in New York: cooks, nannies, construction workers. These satirical scenes question modern heroism and bring into focus the vital role these individuals play in the lives of their families and in the economy of the larger community, on both sides of the border. She made these pictures, she writes, “to pay homage to these brave and determined men and women that somehow manage, without the help of any supernatural power, to withstand extreme conditions of labor in order to help their families and communities survive and prosper.”

And in discussing Pinzon's photographs at the Art Museum of the Americas, Washingtonian magazine observed that :

The iconic "Real Stories of Superheroes" series by Brooklyn-based Mexican photographer Dulce Pinzón depicts Mexican immigrants in the service sector performing their daily tasks while disguised as American superheroes. With titles such as "Aquaman is Juventino Rosas From the State of Mexico. He Works in a Fish Market in New York. He Sends $400 Home Each Week," the portraits memorialize the accomplishments of an enormous but invisible population.

This project is easily Pinzon's best-known series and has been exhibited worldwide in museums, galleries and international art fairs. The process taken by Pinzón in her art photographic activism was cultural consumption (superheroes), customization (Mexican laborers portrayed as superheroes), and intervention (art displayed in mainstream areas such as museums, galleries and art fairs). Inspired by these photographs, in 2015 the Geneva-based International Organization for Migration (IOM) launched a social media campaign under the tag #MigrantHeroes "to invite people around the world to identify and tell the stories of migrant heroes."

In 2012 the photographic series was published in English, Spanish, and French as a book titled Dulce Pinzón: The Real Story of the Superheroes (Editorial RM, ISBN 978-8415118244).

In 2020 the photographs were added to the permanent collection of the Museo Universitario de Arte Contemporáneo in Mexico City and classified as part of the Mexican National Heritage.

=== Loteria ===
As it has been noted in academic research on her work, Dulce Pinzon's work is also clearly inspired by the dualistic culture within Mexicans in New York. She demonstrated this concept of dualism in her 2001–2002 project "Loteria" (Spanish for "Lottery"), which is a traditional Mexican card game. In this project, she used the card images from this well known Mexican card game, and projected these images onto the nude bodies of some of her New York friends and loved ones. This project is also representative of the Cuban scholar Fernando Ortiz Fernández concept of transculturation. By projecting the images of the cards of the "Loteria" game onto the human bodies of New York residents, she demonstrated how culture counter-flows through people's migration patterns, which is a form of cultural remittances.

=== Multiracial ===
Funded by a grant from the Mexican National Fund for Art and Culture (FONCA), this photographic portrait project consists of 16 color portraits of "people of mixed ethnic origin in front of primary color backgrounds." This work has been described as: "Mexican-born New Yorker Dulce Pinzon, in her "Multiracial" series, revisits the bold color fields characteristic of traditional Latin American art and reinterprets them as brilliant backgrounds for explorations into what color means for an increasingly diverse society, evermore concerned with self-identity."

== Environmental activist ==
For many years Pinzon focused a significant amount of energy in environmental issues and in 2017 staged the first artistic intervention with the introduction of the Generosity project, which has been described in the Mexican press as a project that "offers an environmental compromise with the community, having as a focused theme the use of Styrofoam."

Pinzon describes Generosity as "a clandestine project that emerged two years ago, from which I am concerned that products that are used as straws or plastic glasses have a shelf life of one to two minutes and in contrast take hundreds of years to disappear; however, there are already products made with biodegradable materials, such as avocado stone, which will degrade in three months."

== Awards ==
- 2014–2017 – Endowment of the Arts SNCA/FONCA Fellowship, Mexico.
- 2012 – First place Award – Sixth International Photography Symposium: Mazatlán Abierto, Mexico
- 2011 – ZONAMACO Perrier Art Prize for Digital Photography, Mexico City, Mexico
- 2010 – Gaea Foundation/Sea Change Residency Award
- 2008 – Ford Foundation Grant
- 2006 – New York Foundation for the Arts Fellowship in Photography
- 2002 – Jóvenes Creadores Grant, Mexico
- 2002 – Mexican National Fund for Art and Culture grant

== Collections ==
- The Queens Museum of Art, New York, NY
- San Diego Museum of Art, San Diego, CA
- National Museum of Mexican Art, Chicago, IL
- Carnegie Museum, Pittsburgh, PA
- Columbia University, New York, NY
- University of Maryland, College Park, Maryland
- International Center of Photography, New York
- Museo Universitario de Arte Contemporáneo, Mexico City, Mexico
- The Montclair Art Museum, Montclair, NJ
- Snite Museum of Art at The University of Notre Dame
- EnFoco
- Neuberger Museum of Art, Purchase College, State University of New York, Purchase, NY
- Museum of Latin American Art, Long Beach, CA
- Centro de la Imagen, Mexico City, Mexico
- Kalamazoo Institute of Arts, Kalamazoo, Michigan
- El Museo del Barrio, New York, NY

== Selected exhibitions ==
- 2006 – Dulce Pinzon – The Real Story of the Superheroes - Queens Museum, New York, NY, USA
- 2007 – 2008: Kunsthaus Miami, Florida, United States
- 2008
  - The Real Story of Superheroes – Dicke Building Art Gallery at Trinity University, San Antonio, Texas
  - A Declaration of Immigration – National Museum of Mexican Art, Chicago, Illinois, USA
  - Caras Vemos, Corazones no Sabemos: The Human Landscape of Mexican Migration, Haggerty Museum of Art, Marquette University, Milwaukee, Wisconsin, USA
- 2011
  - Fotográfica de Bogotá, Bogotá, Colombia
  - Pittsburgh Biennial, The Andy Warhol Museum, Pittsburgh, Pennsylvania, United States
  - 'Les Rencontres d'Arles Photographie Festival, Arles, France
  - Dulce Pinzón: Superheroes – Foosaner Art Museum, Melbourne, Florida, USA
- 2012 – "Ñew York", Art Museum of the Americas, Washington, DC, USA
- 2013
  - LATINO/US Cotidiano, Museum of Latin American Art, Long Beach, California, USA
  - Double Portraits, San Diego Museum of Art, San Diego, California, USA
  - Character Study, DeCordova Museum and Sculpture Park, Lincoln, Massachusetts, USA
  - The Real Story of Superheroes - Boca Raton Museum of Art, Boca Raton, Florida, USA
  - Scope Art Fair, New York City, USA
- 2015
  - Rosenberg Art Gallery at Goucher College, Towson, Maryland, United States
- 2015
  - PhotoEspaña 2015, Madrid, Spain.
- 2016 – Texas Contemporary, Houston, Texas, USA
- 2017
  - FotoMexico, Mexico City, Mexico
  - Dulce Pinzon: Generosity, Museo Amparo, Puebla, Mexico
  - Context Art Miami, Miami, Florida
- 2018
  - Destination: Latin America, South Bend Museum of Art, South Bend, Indiana, USA
- 2018
  - ZonaMaco Foto, Mexico City, Mexico.
- 2019
  - Culture and The People: El Museo del Barrio, 1969 – 2019, Part I, El Museo del Barrio, Harlem, New York City
  - "Destination: Latin America”, LSU Museum of Art, Louisiana State University, Baton Rouge, Louisiana, USA
  - Men of Steel, Women of Wonder - Crystal Bridges Museum of Art, Bentonville, Arkansas, The Addison Gallery of American Art at Phillips Academy, Andover, Massachusetts, and San Antonio Museum of Art, San Antonio, Texas, US
  - Recent Acquisitions – Neuberger Museum of Art, Purchase, New York, USA
  - Lille 300, El Dorado Festival, The real story of the Superheroes, Lille, France
- 2020
  - ZONAMACO Art Fair, Mexico City, Mexico.
  - La véritable histoire des super-héros Festival de teatro ¿Qué onda México? Nouveau Théâtre de Montreuil, France
- 2021
  - Festival Art Souterrain 2021, Montreal, Canada.
- 2021
  - The Real Super Heroes: Reimagining the Role of Latin American Immigrants through the Photography of Dulce Pinzón, Columbia University, New York, NY.
  - The Rise of a Social Consciousness in the Arts of Mexico since the Revolution. Neuberger Museum of Art, Purchase College, NY.
- 2025 – Encuentro Fotográfico de México, Cholula, Mexico.

== Publications ==
- La verdadera historia de los Superhéroes (2012)
