= The Long Revolution =

1961 book by Raymond Williams

- First edition
- Author: Raymond Williams
- Language: English
- Genre: Cultural studies
- Publisher: Chatto & Windus
- Publication date: 1961
- Media type: Print (book)
- ISBN: 0-14-020762-7
- OCLC: 12448133

The Long Revolution is a 1961 book by Raymond Williams.

== Background ==
The Long Revolution is a followup to the author's earlier work, Culture and Society, a "literary diagnosis of the English social predicament".

== Summary ==
Herbert Gans, writing in The New Leader, notes that this work, as his earlier, is composed of a set of separate essays (that, as such, are not a systematic treatment of its subject).

== Publication history ==
The Long Revolution was first published in English 1961 by Chatto & Windus.

== Reception ==
In a mixed review, Denis William Brogan wrote in The New York Times, "In The Long Revolution, he follows up his deservedly admired Culture and Society with a more contemporary, less literary diagnosis of the English social predicament. It is a moving, often convincing, always readable book, but it is a disappointment after Culture and Society. It is a disappointment because Mr. Williams shows less penetration, less generosity than in his previous book. One reason for this is that Mr. Williams is totally 'committed' to a socialist view of society and a socialist remedy. He is also committed to a basically romantic view of 'the workers'."

Writing for the International Journal of Cultural Policy, Michael Volkerling said that The Long Revolution "while by no means the most coherent text, proved to be the most useful". He praised Williams' "critical perspectives and conceptual analysis that proved to be both compelling and apposite". In a review for The New Leader, Herbert J. Gans wrote, "One wishes only that Williams had presented his argument in a more systematic fashion. The present volume, like his earlier book, is a series of separate essays, and both suffer from the discontinuities inherent in this form."

The New Left Review's Edward Thompson praised the book, writing, "Even a brief passage of his writing has something about it which demands attention—a sense of stubborn, unfashionable integrity, a combination of distinction and force."
