= New Keywords =

New Keywords: A Revised Vocabulary of Culture and Society
- Author: Tony Bennett, Lawrence Grossberg and Meaghan Morris (editors)
- Language: English
- Publisher: Blackwell
- Publication date: 2005
- Media type: Print (Hardcover, Paperback)
- ISBN: 0-631-22568-4 (hardcover); ISBN 0-631-22569-2 (paperback)
- OCLC: 57357498
- Dewey Decimal: 422 22
- LC Class: PE1580 .N49 2005

New Keywords: A Revised Vocabulary of Culture and Society is a book edited by Tony Bennett, Lawrence Grossberg and Meaghan Morris and published in 2005 by Blackwell Publishing. It is an attempt to revise Raymond Williams' seminal 1976 text, Keywords: A Vocabulary of Culture and Society.
