= Cultural remittances =

In anthropology, cultural remittances are the ensembles of ideas, values, and expressive forms introduced into societies of origin by emigrants and their families as they return home, sometimes for the first time, temporary visits, or permanent resettlement. The term, which has been summarized as "product sent back", developed in the early 2000s, is also used to describe "the way that migrants own and build homes in the country of origin."

== Monetary Remittances versus Cultural Remittances ==
Monetary remittances are the transfer of money from migrant workers in a host country to a developing country through various financial institutions such as Western Union, Banco Agricola, and Banco Cuscatlan that transfer monetary capital from the host country of the migrant worker to the home country. Monetary remittances from the United States to various countries in Latin America often make up significant portions of the GDP of Latin American Countries. The impacts of monetary remittances differ from those of cultural remittances in that, monetary remittances mainly influence the economic sector of the receiving country, although monetary remittances can also be introduced into communities through individuals or organizations that receive remittances in order to create basic infrastructures within the communities.

The term cultural remittances was created in the context of Caribbean migrants and the Caribbean diaspora but the theoretical structure can be applied to various countries that experience return migration as well as visits from emigrants. The application of this term is not limited to the Caribbean experience or the Latin American experience of return migration.

== Effects of Cultural Remittances ==
Cultural remittances are altered by the to and fro movements of migratory patterns. They impact the experience and expressions of not only those in the diaspora, but also their family and friends who still reside in the homeland.

Cultural remittances are positive in that they have led to the expansion of kinship bonds between the families that remain behind and their members who migrate. Through greater forms of telecommunications relationships between family members are easier to keep up and through this communications cultural remittances get easily transferred. According to Teófilo Altamirano Rua in Migration, Remittances, and Development In Times of Crisis, remittances are rooted in internal migration from the countryside to cities and vice versa. Their origin lies in the reciprocity, interchange and bonds of kinship that lie between family members. Kinship will grow stronger and affect the nation because practices of reciprocity will continue as a form of cultural remittances.

The return migrant also brings back with him the ability and incentive to challenge and change the society to which he returns because of his experiences. He brings back new ideas, work skills, artistic expression, and capital which help benefit the home nation. Not just in terms of money, but these new ideas will serve as a type of social change where there is progress toward the establishment of a self-reliant society. Remittances, monetary and cultural, help support the nation in building a stronger economy and contribute education, housing and business development.

Music is also a cultural remittance. In Flores’ book The Diaspora Strikes Back, he notes that music has been largely affected by cultural remittances, there is a cultural collision between host and home land. With Flores’ main example: Salsa. Salsa has served as a cultural remittance in that it is a mixture of Afro-Cuban samplings with styles from Puerto Rico, Colombia, Panama, and other Afro Cuban references with the essence of the Nuyorican’s musical taste in jazz, soul, and rock. The Salsa sound is not only cross cultural but the lyrical implications refer to the complex diaspora the musician and his fans have gone through. Salsa was created in New York City, but as part of this circular migration has reached back to the island, in this case Puerto Rico, establishing itself as a form of Puerto Rican authenticity while also being a marker of Nuyorican diasporic authenticity. “Salsa is the musical baggage, the stylistic remittance of the diaspora on its return to the Island.” As a cultural remittance, Salsa and other forms of music which have been transformed due to the constant flow of migrants, offers a free form of cultural expression where one can find national belonging, self-identity, or use music as a form of social resistance.

== See also ==
- Peggy Levitt
- Remittances
- Gifting remittances
- Chain migration (section Remittances)
