= Loyalty (disambiguation) =

Loyalty is a firm and consistent allegiance to and support of a person, group, or cause.

Loyalty may also refer to:

== Places ==
- Loyalty Building, in Portland, Oregon, on the U.S. National Register of Historic Places
- Loyalty Islands, a part of the French territory of New Caledonia in the Pacific Ocean

== Arts, entertainment, and media ==
=== Music ===
==== Albums ====
- Loyalty (Fat Joe album), 2002
- Loyalty (Screwball album), 2001
- Loyalty (Soulja Boy album), 2015

==== Classical music ====
- Loyalty (Shostakovich), a 1970 song cycle for male acapella choir by Dmitri Shostakovich

==== Songs ====
- "Loyalty" (Birdman song), 2010
- "Loyalty" (Kendrick Lamar song), 2017
- "Loyalty", a song from Mardi Gras (1958 film), recorded by Pat Boone
- "Loyalty", a song from the 2017 album Polygondwanaland by King Gizzard and the Lizard Wizard
- "Loyalty", a song from the 2021 album 25 by G Herbo

=== Television ===
- "Loyalty" (Angel), a 2002 episode
- "Loyalty" (Law & Order: Criminal Intent), a 2010 episode
- "Loyalty" (Scott & Bailey), a 2012 episode
- "Loyalty", an episode of the British sitcom Birds of a Feather

=== Other uses in arts, entertainment, and media ===
- Loyalty (film), a 2003 British television film part of the Hornblower series
- Loyalty (monument), a monument to a dog in the Russian city of Tolyatti

== Business ==
- Customer loyalty

== Ships ==
- HMS Loyalty, several British Royal Navy warships
- USS Loyalty, several United States Navy warships

== See also ==
- Loyalties (disambiguation)
- Loyalty program
