= Contraflow =

Contraflow can refer to:

- Contraflow lane, a transportation engineering technique of creating a single traffic lane that flows in the direction opposite of the surrounding lanes
- Contraflow lane reversal, the practice of creating, temporarily or permanently, a contraflow lane
- Counter-flow (also called contraflow), the flow of culture counter to the normal dominant-to-dominated cultural adaptation patterns
