= Tony Bennett (sociologist) =

British and Australian sociologist (born 1947)

Tony Bennett FAcSS FAHA
- Born: Frederick Anthony Bennett; February 12, 1947 (age 79); Manchester, England
- Occupation: Sociologist
- Known for: "Putting Policy into Cultural Studies" (1992)

Academic background
- Education: Oxford University (BA 1968); University of Sussex (PhD 1972)

Frederick Anthony Bennett FAcSS FAHA (born 12 February 1947) is a British and Australian sociologist who has held academic positions in the United Kingdom and Australia. His work focusses on cultural studies, cultural policy, and cultural history.

== Early life and education ==
Tony Bennett was born Frederick Anthony Bennett on 12 February 1947 in Manchester, England. He earned a BA in Politics, Philosophy and Economics at Oxford University in 1968 and a PhD in sociology at Sussex University in 1972 that was focussed on the relations between the concepts of realism and class consciousness in the work of György Lukács.

== Career ==
In the 1970s and early 1980s, Bennett taught sociology at the Open University in the United Kingdom, as a staff tutor and then as chair of the Popular Culture course. In this period he produced his first major book, Formalism and Marxism, published 1979, which argued for the compatibility of Russian formalism with Marxism while criticizing Althusserian Marxism.

He moved to Griffith University in Brisbane in 1983, where he became Professor of Cultural Studies, Dean of Humanities, and director of the ARC Key Centre for Cultural and Media Policy until 1998. During this time, he turned towards the work of Michel Foucault and away from the Marxism of Stuart Hall and Antonio Gramsci. His 1990 book Outside Literature demonstrated an early stage of this postmodern turn, while 1995's The Birth of the Museum was unambiguously indebted to Foucault.

In this phase of his career he began to work specifically on cultural policy: he set up an Institute for Cultural Policy Studies at Griffith in the late 1980s, and prepared the paper "Putting Policy into Cultural Studies" for a University of Illinois Urbana-Champaign cultural studies conference in 1990. This paper was widely regarded as seminal, though it had markedly more limited impact in the US than elsewhere and though it came in for sharp criticism from leading US scholars, particularly by Marxists including Fredric Jameson. It was published in 1992 as a chapter in the book Cultural Studies edited by Lawrence Grossberg, Cary Nelson, and Paula A. Treichler. He continued this work with further essays collected in Culture: A Reformer's Science (1998), which again championed a Foucauldian approach against "resistance" theories of culture from Stuart Hall and Raymond Williams to Michel de Certeau, and with a survey of Australian cultural policy in Culture in Australia: Policies, Publics, Programs (2001).

In 1998 he returned to the Open University, where he became Professor of Sociology and a founding director of the ESRC Centre for Research on Socio-cultural Change (CRESC). Here he produced the sociology course textbook Understanding Everyday Life (2002) with Diane Watson.

In 2009 he returned to Australia as research professor in Social and Cultural Theory at the Institute for Culture and Society at Western Sydney University, while remaining a visiting research professor at the Open University and an associate member of CRESC. By this time his key post-structuralist influences had also expanded to include Pierre Bourdieu, Nikolas Rose, and Bruno Latour. He became emeritus in 2020. He has also been a visiting professor at universities in the United States, China, and Canada.

His work has been important in literary and popular culture studies, especially as a founder of the Australian school of cultural policy studies. He is an elected fellow of the Australian Academy of the Humanities (1997). He was the founding editor of the Journal of Cultural Economy.

== Selected publications ==
=== Chapters and articles ===
- Bennett, Tony (1992). "Putting Policy into Cultural Studies". In Grossberg, Lawrence; Nelson, Cary; Treichler, Paula A. (eds.). Cultural Studies. doi:10.4324/9780203699140.

=== Books ===
- Formalism and Marxism (1979), on Marxist literary criticism and Russian formalism
- Outside Literature (1990), on Marxist literary criticism and postmodernism
- The Birth of the Museum: History, Theory, Politics (1995), a Foucauldian study of the origins and cultural function of the modern museum
- Culture: A Reformer's Science (1998), a reexamination of cultural policy studies
- Culture in Australia: Policies, Publics, Programs (ed., with David Carter, 2001)
- Understanding Everyday Life (ed., with Diane Watson, 2002), textbook for their Open University core course in sociology
- Pasts Beyond Memories: Evolution, Museums, Colonialism (2004)
- Making Culture, Changing Society (2013)
- Museums, Power, Knowledge: Selected Essays (2018)
