= Complex seeing =

The English term Complex Seeing is taken from Bertolt Brecht's writing on theatre and opera. First found in Brecht's notes to the Threepenny Opera, a subsequently edited and updated version was published. This text can be found in English translation as "The Literarization of Theatre" from 1931, in Brecht on Theatre, where the key passage on complex seeing reads:

“Some exercise in complex seeing is needed—though it is perhaps more important to be able to think above the stream than to think in the stream."(44)

Here Brecht describes a desired form of spectator activity, in which the 'stream' of the play's action does not entirely capture the audience's attention, which is instead divided within and without. This is part of Brecht's many attempts to open a new critical possibilities for theatre, which in this case emphasizes a type of expert-detachment on the part of the spectator. Continuing the quotation from above:

"Moreover the use of screens imposes and facilitates a new style of acting. This style of acting is the epic style. As he reads the projections on the screen the spectator adopts an attitude of smoking-and-watching. Such an attitude on his part at once compels a better and clearer performance as it is hopeless to 'carry away' any man who is smoking and accordingly pretty well occupied with himself. By these means one would soon have a theatre full of experts, just as one has sporting arenas full of experts. [...] Unfortunately it is to be feared that titles and permissions to smoke are not of themselves enough to lead the audience to a more fruitful use of the theatre."(44)

A major source for the concept of complex seeing in English is Raymond Williams' writings on the subject, which include his 1961 "The Achievement of Brecht", published in Critical Quarterly, as well as the relevant chapters of his 1966 Modern Tragedy and 1968 Drama From Ibsen to Brecht. Here Williams develops the idea of complex seeing away from Brecht's discussion of the audience and instead towards the plays. Williams' complex seeing departs from Brecht's metaphor of 'above' and 'within' a flow of action towards a type of double vision which presents contradictions in social life without attempting to resolve them.
