= Keywords: A Vocabulary of Culture and Society =

1976 book by Raymond Williams

- First edition
- Author: Raymond Williams
- Language: English
- Genre: Cultural studies
- Publisher: Croom Helm
- Publication date: 1976
- Publication place: Britain
- Media type: Print (book)
- Pages: 286
- ISBN: 0-19-519854-9
- OCLC: 2043617
- Dewey Decimal: 422
- LC Class: PE1580 .W58

Keywords: A Vocabulary of Culture and Society is a book by the Welsh Marxist academic Raymond Williams published in 1976 by Croom Helm.

Originally intended to be published along with the author's 1958 work Culture and Society, this work examines the history of more than a hundred words that are familiar and yet confusing: Art, Bureaucracy, Culture, Educated, Management, Masses, Nature, Originality, Radical, Society, Welfare, Work, and many others.

The approach is cultural rather than etymological. Sometimes the origins of a word cast light on its meaning, but often one finds that it originally meant something quite different. Or that there has been a fierce political struggle over the 'correct' meaning.

A revised and expanded edition of Keywords was published by Fontana in 1983. In 2005 Blackwell published New Keywords: A Revised Vocabulary of Culture and Society, an attempt to update Williams' text.

== Summary of Williams's "Culture" ==
In his essay on "Culture" within Keywords, Williams begins by tracing the origin and development of the word. For him, it is one of the most complicated words in the English language not just due to its intricate historical development but mainly due to its relevance and indisputable impact in other systems of thought.

Williams then goes on to map the treatment that the word underwent in Latin and French, along with the range of meanings it became a host to, until it got passed on to English. "The primary meaning was then in husbandry, the tending of natural growth." This then explains the metaphoric meaning (a noun of process) it undertook when "the tending of natural growth was extended to the process of human development". This, along with the meaning in husbandry, was the main sense until 1C18 and eC19.

Williams points out that this sense developed crucially towards a "degree of habituation" being added to the metaphor as well as "an extension of particular processes to a general process, which the word could abstractly carry". It is from here that the independent noun 'culture' began its complicated modern history with its complicated latencies of meaning.

Williams refers to a letter from 1730 (Bishop of Killala to Mrs. Clayton), which he cites from John H. Plumb's England in the Eighteenth Century, as one of the earliest recorded examples in English of 'culture' appearing as an independent noun, an abstract process or the product of such a process. He then quotes Mark Akenside (1744), William Wordsworth (1805) and Jane Austen (1816) to illustrate their uses of the word 'culture' and make clear the fact that "culture was developing in English towards some of its modern senses before the decisive effects of a new social and intellectual movement".

Williams then considers analogous developments in other languages, especially in German. German borrowed the word 'culture' from French, Cultur and later spelt Kultur, its main use synonymous to 'cultivation': first in the abstract sense of a general process of becoming 'civilized or cultivated'; second in the sense which had already been established for civilization by the historians of the Enlightenment as a description of the secular process of human development. Then Johann Gottfried von Herder, according to Williams, in his unfinished Ideas on the Philosophy of the History of Mankind (1784–91), brought about a decisive change of use in the word where he challenged the universal histories' assumption that civilization or culture – the historical self-development of humanity – was a unilinear process; an assumption that led to the "high and dominant point of C18 European Culture" and thereby attacking that very dominant claim to a superior culture.

Taking up from Herder, "cultures in the plural" were looked at; to speak of "cultures of the plural: the specific and variable cultures of different nations and periods, but also the specific and variable cultures of social and economic groups within a nation." This sense of culture was widely developed in the Romantic movement as an alternative to the orthodox and dominant 'civilization'. From here, the new concept of 'folk-culture' emerged, emphasizing national and traditional cultures. This sense of culture was primarily a response to the emergence of the "mechanical character of the new civilization" and was introduced to distinguish between "human and material development".

However, the 1840s in Germany saw Kultur being used very much in the sense of civilization as used in the eighteenth-century universal histories. Williams refers to G. F. Klemms' Allgemeine Kulturgeschichte de Menschheit – 'General Cultural History of Mankind' (1843–52) – to illustrate this use of Kultur in the sense of tracing human development from savagery through domestication to freedom.

These various treatments of 'culture' contribute to its modern usage and complexity. There is, then, the literal continuity of physical process as used in say 'sugar-beet culture' or 'germ culture'. Beyond this physical reference, Williams recognises three broad categories of usage:

"(i) The independent and abstract noun which describes a general process of intellectual, spiritual and aesthetic development, from C18.
(ii) The independent noun, whether used generally or specifically, which indicates a particular way of life, whether of a people, a period, a group, or humanity in general, from Herder and Klemm.
(iii) the independent and abstract noun which describes the works and practices of intellectual and especially artistic activity."

The third category, a relatively late one according to Williams, seems to lend itself to the widespread usage of 'culture' to refer to music, literature, painting and sculpture, theatre and film.

The complex and still active history of the word, along with its complex senses, "indicates a complex argument about the relations between general human development and a particular way of life, and between both and the works and the practices of art and intelligence". Embedded within the complex argument are also the opposed as well as overlapping positions, thereby further complicating the argument. Rather than trying to reduce the complexity of usage, Williams advocates that "The complexity, that is to say, is not finally in the word but in the problems which its variations of use significantly indicate".
