= We Gotta Get Out of This Place (disambiguation) =

"We Gotta Get Out of This Place" is a 1965 rock song by The Animals.

We Gotta Get Out of This Place may also refer to:

- We Gotta Get Out of This Place (album) by Angelic Upstarts (1980)
- We Gotta Get Out of This Place (book) by Lawrence Grossberg (1992)
- We Gotta Get Outta This Place, 1967 album by Charles Wayne Day
- Bad Turn Worse, a 2013 American film also known as We Gotta Get Out of This Place
