= Koba (play) =

Play by Raymond Williams

Koba is a dramatic play that was written in 1958–59 by Raymond Williams. It was first published in the 1966 edition of Modern Tragedy. The 1979 edition of Modern Tragedy does not include it.

The play involves fictitious characters, but parallels the life of Joseph Stalin. Characters include Peter, Max and George, along with Joseph - later Koba - and Jordan, based on Vladimir Lenin. It takes a mixed view of the Stalin-character:

- LUKE: What we have really to face is how all this happened, how we became strong.
- MARK: It was not only Koba. In many ways he made us weaker.
- LUKE: But in other ways stronger.
- (Act Two, Scene VII).

Raymond Williams's later thoughts on the play and the wider question of the Soviet Union can be found in Politics and Letters; Part V, Chapter 3.
