= People of the Black Mountains =

Book by Raymond Williams

- Volume 1 (first edition)
- Author: Raymond Williams
- Language: English
- Genre: Historical novel
- Publisher: Chatto and Windus
- Publication date: 1989
- Publication place: United Kingdom
- Media type: Print (Hardback & Paperback)
- ISBN: 0-7011-2845-3
- OCLC: 176769260

People of the Black Mountains is a historical novel by Raymond Williams.

This book is a work in two volumes, published in 1989 and 1990. It features a great diversity of people in a single place across the ages. Most of them are ordinary people living unprivileged lives. It is told through a series of flashbacks featuring an ordinary man in modern times. He is looking for his grandfather who has not returned from a hill-walk, but has visions of the past as it might have been.

It begins in the Old Stone Age and extends through to the Middle Ages, telling a series of fictionalized short stories about ordinary people in the Welsh-border region of the Black Mountains where he was born and grew up.

The series is solidly based on what archaeologists have found – some of the tales are speculative reconstructions based on real burials. It has been praised for "brilliant clarity and imaginative vision" (Sunday Telegraph) and hailed as "the great historic novel Wales has long deserved" (Wales on Sunday).

The story-sequence would have extended to modern times had Williams lived to finish it. What exists is a complete story arc extending from the Old Stone Age to the late-Mediaeval period. The story begins in the Old Stone Age and was intended to come right up to modern times, always focusing on ordinary people. He had completed it as mediaeval times when he died in 1988. It was prepared for publication by his wife Joy Williams and was published in two volumes, along with a Postscript that gives a brief description of what the remaining work would have been.

== Stories include ==
- Primitive hunters living before the last Ice-age
- Similar hunter gatherers returning after the ice, and their possible marriage-customs
- The arrival of the first Neolithic farmers; in this case pastoralists with sheep, which the local hunters don't initially recognise as creatures they should not hunt.
- A visiting astronomer-priest from the culture that later produced the Stonehenge trilithons
- Peaceful people are hit by murderous raiders, and realise that they will have to adapt to be secure
- The same people a few generations on get taken over by a professional warrior, who says he is there to help
- Celtic warriors now dominate, and their values contradict those of the older peoples
- The defeat of a Roman force by Welsh tribesmen, the Silures.
- 'King Arthur', here seen as Artorius, a warlord who had defeated the Saxons but here seen as a burden to the ordinary farmers who produced the food that the warriors ate.
- Harold Godwinson riding through, having briefly chased out the Normans during the reign of Edward the Confessor.
- The Normans pushing into Wales after 1066
- A local revolt that merges into the general rebellion of Owain Glyndŵr in the early 15th century.
- Sir John Oldcastle seeking refuge after being persecuted for supporting the Lollards.
