= Second Generation (novel) =

1964 novel by Raymond Williams

- First edition (publ. Chatto & Windus)
- Author: Raymond Williams
- Language: English
- Publisher: Chatto & Windus
- Publication date: 1964

Second Generation is a 1964 novel by Raymond Williams, set in the 1960s. It focuses on the contrasting worlds of the university and the factory, and individuals who try to find their place among contradictory forces.

== Plot summary ==
Harold Owen, his brother Gwyn, son Peter and wife Kate all experience the contrasts. The book is based on the actual situation in Oxford of the 1960s, where the ancient university was right next to Morris Motors, as it then was.

== See also ==
- Border Country
- The Fight for Manod
