= Culture and Society =

Book by Raymond Williams

Culture and Society, 1780-1950
- First American edition (1960); publ. Columbia University Press
- Author: Raymond Williams
- Language: English
- Genre: Cultural studies
- Publisher: Chatto and Windus
- Publication date: 1958
- Media type: Print (book)
- ISBN: 0-7012-0792-2
- OCLC: 16466015

Culture and Society, 1780-1950 is a book published in 1958 by Welsh progressive writer Raymond Williams, exploring how the notion of culture developed in Great Britain, from the eighteenth through the twentieth centuries. Williams argues that the notion of culture developed in response to the Industrial Revolution and the social and political changes it brought in its wake.

== Synopsis ==
According to Oliver Bennet, in writing a review for the International Journal of Cultural Policy about this book in 2010, "In examining the work of over 40 writers, including Burke, Coleridge, Carlyle, Mill, Matthew Arnold, Marx, William Morris, Oscar Wilde and T.S. Eliot, Williams identifies a tradition of thinking about culture, which develops in response to the changing social and economic conditions brought about by the growth of industrialism."

== See also ==
- Information culture
