= Loyalties =

Loyalties may refer to:

- Loyalty, a philosophical concept
- Loyalty Islands
- Loyalties (play), a play by John Galsworthy
- Loyalties (1933 film), a 1933 film starring Basil Rathbone
- Loyalties (1986 film), a 1986 British/Canadian film (also known as Double allégeance)
- Loyalties (1999 film), a 1999 Canadian documentary about slavery
- Loyalties (novel), a 1985 novel by Raymond Williams
