= The Country and the City =

1973 book by Raymond Williams

- Author: Raymond Williams
- Language: English
- Genre: Cultural studies
- Publisher: Chatto and Windus & Spokesman Books
- Publication date: 1973 & 2011
- Publication place: United Kingdom
- Media type: Print (book)
- Pages: 336
- ISBN: 0-7012-1005-2
- OCLC: 12501469
- LC Class: PR409.C5 W5x 1985

The Country and the City is a book of cultural analysis by Raymond Williams first published in 1973. It analyses cultural concepts of the country and the city as expressed through literature from the middle ages to the present day, and especially the association of the country with innocence, virtue, and foolishness, and of the city with vice, learning, and sophistication. The book challenges simplistic ideas of rural and urban, setting literary developments in the context of agricultural and industrial history, "from the dawn of English agrarian capitalism in the late Middle Ages to the global anti-colonial revolutions of the 1950s and '60s". It argues that there has never been a sharp division between the country and the city, deconstructing the idea of capitalism as an external force that destroyed an idyllic rural way of life.

== Origins ==
Coming from the Welsh border, a village in the Black Mountains, Raymond Williams found that the images of rural life taught at the University of Cambridge did not match what he had seen. As an academic at Cambridge, he studied and examined the contradiction, along with the contrasting idea of the city, which in the United Kingdom has never been separate from the countryside. Rural life without cities had existed in other parts of the world, but not for a very long time in Britain.

Chapter 2, A Problem of Perspective, examines the idea that an ancient continuous rural life has recently ended. Authors generally remember this timeless order existing in their own childhood. But look at writers from the time of their childhood, and they consider that the timeless order has already vanished, having still existed in the older writer's childhood. He gives a chain of examples, going back as far as William Langland's Piers Plowman and Pope Innocent III in the fourteenth and twelfth centuries, respectively, but suggests one could continue doing so all the way back to Eden. This "escalator", as he calls it, does not serve to explain a greater narrative about pastoralism, but rather allows him to employ "precise analysis of each kind of retrospect, as it comes." (p. 12)

Urban life is also examined - see in particular chapter 19, Cities of Darkness and of Light.

== Discussion of the country and the city ==
In The Country and the City, Raymond Williams analyzes images of the country and the city in English literature since the 16th century, and how these images become central symbols for conceptualizing the social and economic changes associated with capitalist development in England. Williams debunks the notion of rural life as simple, natural, and unadulterated, leaving an image of the country as a Golden age. This is, according to Williams, "a myth functioning as a memory" that dissimulates class conflict, enmity, and animosity present in the country since the 16th century. Williams shows how this imagery is embedded in the writings of English poets, novelists and essayists. These writers have not just reproduced the rural-urban divide, but their works have also served to justify the existing social order. The city, on the other hand, is depicted in English novels as a symbol of capitalist production, labor, domicile, and exploitation, where it is seen as the "dark mirror" of the country. The country represented Eden while the city became the hub of modernity, a quintessential place of loneliness and loss of romanticism. In the novels of Charles Dickens and Thomas Hardy, there seems to be a feeling of loss, and at the same time a sense of harmony among the lonely and isolated souls.

For Williams, "the contrast of the country and city is one of the major forms in which we become conscious of a central part of our experience and of the crises of our society" (p. 289). What kinds of experience do the ideas appear to interpret, and why do certain forms occur or recur at this period or at that? To answer these questions, Williams argues that "we need to trace, historically and critically, the various forms of the ideas" (p. 290). It is this historical perspective that makes Williams's work essentially important for it rejects a simple, dualistic explanation of the city as evil in search of peace and harmony in the countryside. Instead, Williams sees the country as inextricably related to the city. In search of the historical, lived form, Williams distinguishes two of his best-known categories: "knowable communities" and the "structure of feeling." Over the centuries, Williams describes the prevailing structure of feeling—traces of the lived experience of a community distinct from the institutional and ideological organization of the society—in the works of poets and novelists.

In the same vein, Williams sees most novels as "knowable communities" in the sense that the "novelist offers to show people and their relationships in essentially knowable and communicable ways" (p. 163). In sum, Williams notably said: "It was always a limited inquiry: the country and the city within a single tradition. But it has brought me to the point where I can offer its meanings, its implications and its connections to others: for discussion and amendment; for many kinds of possible cooperative work; but above all for an emphasis—the sense of an experience and of ways of changing it—in the many countries and cities where we live" (p. 306).

== See also ==
- Chapter Eight of Raymond Williams: Hope and Defeat in the Struggle for Socialism
