= Gifting remittances =

"Gifting remittances" describes a range of scholarly approaches relating remittances to anthropological literature on gift giving. The terms draws on Lisa Cliggett's "gift remitting", but is used to describe a wider body of work. Broadly speaking, remittances are the money, goods, services, and knowledge that migrants send back to their home communities or families. Remittances are typically considered as the economic transactions from migrants to those at home. While remittances are also a subject of international development and policy debate and sociological and economic literature, this article focuses on ties with literature on gifting and reciprocity or gift economy founded largely in the work of Marcel Mauss and Marshall Sahlins. While this entry focuses on remittances of money or goods, remittances also take the form of ideas and knowledge. For more on these, see Peggy Levitt's work on "social remittances" which she defines as "the ideas, behaviors, identities, and social capital that flow from receiving to sending country communities."

== Anthropologists on remittances ==
Anthropological work on remittances appears to be divided into two streams: one based on overseas diasporas of migrants (primarily in Latin America, the Caribbean, and Asia) and the other from urban areas to rural (primarily in Africa). While both are interested in the relationships among migrants and remittance recipients, the transnational work tends to approach financial remittances as a key source of support for rural households in the sending countries while the other focuses on monetary remittances as gifts, and on the intentionality of gift giving in maintaining relationships. All share a focus on the exchange within relationships, within the context of a household, family, kinship, community or other social network.

Within the transnationalism framework, Jeffrey Cohen and Dennis Conway have detailed a debate in which remittances are treated as either sources of development (for example by funding water infrastructure projects in sending communities) or dependency (by perpetuating a cycle migration and remittances to maintain households and communities). They draw on their experiences with transnational migrants in Oaxaca, Mexico to show that this is a false divide. Their focus on the noneconomic, gender, and informal economy relationships that accompany migration, highlights the shared emphasis on relationships and social context which marks anthropological treatment of remittances as distinct and which ties transnational work with that of those explicitly focusing on gift remitting.

Although in apparent disagreement with Cohen and Conway on the development/dependency debate, Leigh Binford strengthens the call for studying remittances as an international process, documenting the impact of remittances on both sides of the exchange, an approach to which anthropologists are well trained. One space for such a transnational treatment of “gifting remittances” is in the analysis of barrels filled with new and recycled gifts sent home, typically to the Caribbean or Asia.

== Gift Remitting, Remitting the Gift ==
While remittances could also be theorized as gifts are not considered as remmitance in the above-mentioned transnational work, the terms gift remitting and remitting the gift make explicit the focus on gifts and the accompanying social ties. Discussion of “gift remittances” goes back at least to Aderanti Adepoju's work in Nigeria on the socio-economic links between urban migrants and their rural sending communities in which money is remitted alongside gifts not readily available in the home country. In this work the focus on socio-cultural context and networks is strong. That the economic cost may be high for the migrant head of household is highlighted as visiting and bringing the requisite gifts can be very expensive, a disincentive to visiting the non-migrating family and community members.

Margo Russell writes that defining remitted moneys as gifts rather than payments enhances freedom and flexibility for the giver. This works in Swaziland because moneys are not sent to a household but to “a range of individuals in urban and rural areas to whom, because of specific relationships, various workers feel a particular obligation.” Here ties are not just of affect; they are of mutual obligation reinforced through the passage of gifts. Gifting remittances fits within and strengthens a larger pattern of reciprocity and obligation in Swaziland.

Following on the work of these earlier anthropologists working in Africa, Lisa Cliggett uses the phrases "gift remitting" and "remitting the gift" to describe urban to rural gifting among Zambian families, highlighting that these remittances are more irregular, are of lesser amounts, and tend to be material as opposed to monetary. In Zambia, urban migration and remittance strategies serve to uphold ties, thereby reducing insecurity and allowing for return migration, particularly in old age. Unlike the interests of policy makers and scholars interested in remittances for development, Cliggett emphasizes that: "Zambia migrants do not remit large sums of cash or goods, and that the fundamental concern for migrants in Zambia is investing in people and relationships through remitting, rather than investing in development, improved living conditions or other capital in rural sending communities."

Trager provides support from a similar phenomenon in Nigeria, where she has observed intentional use of even minimal remittances and services to maintain home-town ties with family, kin, and the community as a whole. The regular giving of remittances and other services such as joining hometown associations and helping in community fund-raising maintained ties. Conway and Cohen also describe cases in which remittance to the community and communal reciprocal relationships were equally important to kin. Along the lines of Mark Granovetter’s strength of weak ties, they describe non-kin relationships as even more important as household ties and obligations as the social aid networks are very flexible and reinforcing.

Charles Piot’s Remotely Global: Village Modernity in West Africa places the analysis of domestic gift remitting explicitly within a framework of global change, showing how remittances from wage workers and gifts from successful cash croppers are transforming landscape and relations of exchange, personhood, and social solidarity. His work reinforces that gifting exists alongside and within the capitalist world economy and represents an attempt to update Marcel Mauss’s theory of the gift for the 21st Century, a project more fully undertaken by Maurice Godelier.

== Anthropology of Gifting ==
=== The Gift ===
In her forward to The Gift: The Form and Reason for Exchange in Archaic Societies, Mary Douglas summarizes Marcel Mauss’s argument succinctly: “no free gift” as gifts entail maintenance of mutual ties. In terms of potlatch in North America, this meant that each gift is “part of a system of reciprocity in which the honor of giver and recipient are engaged” and failing to return means losing the competition for honor.” A Maussian approach to giving and reciprocity provides useful insight into the analysis of “gifting remittances” precisely because of the focus on constructing and maintaining ties through the giving and receiving of such funds, goods, and services.

=== From the Spirit of the Gift to the Social Life of Things ===
Since Mauss discussed the ability of gifts to drive giving, receiving, and reciprocating gifting as animating objects through a piece of the giver going with the property, the spirit of the gift has been a subject of scholarship. Mauss termed this spirit “hua” a Māori word describing “the spirit of things” and discusses its mana, referring to a certain power or authority of the giver or the gift itself. Because of the “thing itself possesses a soul” for the Māori, and for Mauss's theory of the gift “to make a gift of something to someone is to make a present of some part of oneself” and “to accept something from somebody is to accept some part of his spiritual essence, of his soul.” More simply put, receiving a gift carries with it an obligation to receive and to reciprocate, and the gift itself drives this system of exchange. It is based on this that the anthropology of gifting is located on the contextual and historically contingent relationship between giver and receiver turned reciprocator.

Trager's work in Nigeria supports the sense of obligation tied to gift giving, or, conversely, the need for continued use of gifting remittances and services to maintain relationships with kin and community: “Even those with little interest in community affairs or in ever living in the home town themselves, feel obliged to maintain ties in these ways.”

In Enigma of the Gift Maurice Godelier summarizes and critiques Marcel Mauss’s work in “The Gift.”, updating it to more explicitly treat interwoven domains of market exchange, gift exchange, and withholding objects from the realm of exchange. Mauss, however, had observed the persistence of gift giving in his contemporary society of early 20th century France in Chapter 4 of The Gift, wherein he raised an important criticism of the concept of utility and its attendant theories of value, which were coming to dominate economic theory of day, even so far as to inform the French policies that created the social welfare system (Fournier 2006, Gane 1992). Noting that Mauss did well to highlight the three obligations of gift exchange (gift, receipt, reciprocation) his focus was strongest on the question of reciprocity and he failed to pay sufficient attention to receiving or giving. Godelier suggests that Mauss's depiction of the spirit of the gift as the ultimate explanation for its reciprocation - not just as a symbol or bonds of knowledge of social relations – resulted from Mauss's inability to adequately resolve his own questions, thereby leaving objects with agency, free of the people who created it. ("It will basically look as if things themselves had persons in tow". Godelier says this positioning of spirit and agency in the gift basically leaves all objects and all of nature as human and human centered, set in motion purely by human will.)

All of the articles grouped here under the loose rubric of “gifting remittances” share this fundamental focus on locating exchange within socio-cultural relationships and using the insight that gifting/remitting grants broader insight into the broader economy and culture, approximating Mauss's treatment of the study of the gift as a window onto a study of the sum total of social life. Yet none goes so far as to speak directly of the mana or hua of gifts or remittances even though the ability of gifts to spur reciprocation is part of the analysis and of the calculations of those doing the remitting. With his stance that the divide between gifts and commodity exchange is overstated, Arjun Appadurai’s treatment of gifts and commodities as, like people, having “social lives” is closer to their work. However, with this definition of the commodity as "anything intended for exchange" (1986: 9), he thereby makes gift giving into a social act that is nearly indistinguishable from commodity exchange and ultimately emphasizes the economic value of giving, rather than the social, moral or spiritual values that people mark as important. By blurring the distinction between commodities and gifts, a distinction that ordinary people routinely make in their everyday lives as they give emphasis to the value they place on specific social relationships, Appadurai undermines the possibility of understanding the movement of goods and money, between life as a commodity embedded in a market to life as a gift embedded in intimate relationships of giving, receiving, and reciprocating. For Appadurai the definitions of both commodities and gifts are not only socially constructed but provisional. From his position Appadurai can only describe, but he cannot explain, how social acts of giving gifts seem to multiply with the advance of the market.

=== Motivations and gifting ===
Drawing on Marshall Sahlins, Pierre Bourdieu reminds us that gifting morphs with social distance: as social distance increases, self-interest and calculation increases and the importance of generosity and equity declines... the logic of warfare enters even as people look for ways to mediate the distance by “striv[ing] to substitute a personal relationship for an impersonal, anonymous one”. Yet, while the capacity to calculate is universal the spirit of calculation (the presumed rationality of the economic actor) is culturally and historically contingent: the "economic habitus" of an actor is learned. Understanding that gifts move in and out of overlapping economic systems and that the manner in which they move may be impacted by social and physical space, is useful in analyzing the transnational and market-based relations in which remittances are generated, transferred, and spent.

Similarly, the motivations of actors over time are contingent and may, at one point, be altruistic and at other self-interested. Tumama describes motivations for remitting among New Zealand migrants which range from future investments to maintaining kinship ties which pushed some to go without food while striving to remit. A motivation of self-interest may become necessary as “it is likely that the pressures of providing for a family in New Zealand may override the gift giving traditions for some younger Pacific people” who are unable to meet the financial stress of general and traditional gift giving. Focusing on El Salvador, Ester Hernandez and Susan Bibler Coutin, take the discussion of motives – or portrayal of them – to the national level. They show that by treating remittances as “altruistic gifts or unrequited transfers,” central banks can make them appear as cost free money transfers. In turn, those who do not save a significant portion of received remittances are portrayed as selfish, i.e. as self-interested instead of altruistic actors.

=== Gifting and Social Analysis ===
In her overview of anthropological theory from the perspective of the gift, Karen Sykes presents analysis of the gift as a relationship between people in which the relationship is made substantial by the tangible exchange as encompassing not just ceremony (as with Malinowski) but all of social life (as with Mauss). For Sykes, focusing on the gift is a way to avoid the pitfall of focusing on the individual and having to conjecture individual motivations or on motivations and being locked into an abstract analysis of the contents of the human mind. Sykes argues that focusing on the relationship, or the exchange, keeps the analysis squarely within anthropological analysis of social relations. She concludes by arguing for focus on the gift as the focus of economic anthropology because, "when understood as a total social fact, gift giving concentrates many aspects of human relationships, but does not underwrite all of them as the economic." In her summary of gifting, Lisa Cliggett concurs: "gift giving is a good way to see all the various aspects of human nature in action at one time because gifts can be simultaneously understood as rational exchange, as a way to build political and social relations, and as expressions of moral ideas and cultural meanings" These insights, show that Mauss's assertion that gift exchange is about building social relationships remains a central part of gift theory to this day. Articulated as such (ex. Cliggett's work in Zambia) or not (Cohen's and Conway's work in Oaxaca), it is an insight that is also central to work within the general rubric of gifting remittances. The Holy Ghost the TRuth Remittance

== Bibliography ==
- Adepoju, A. (1974). "Migration and Socio-Economic Links between Urban Migrants and Their Home Communities in Nigeria." Africa: Journal of the International African Institute 44(4): 383–396.
- Appadurai, A. (1986). Introduction: Commodities and the Politics of Value. The Social Life of Things: Commodities in Cultural Perspective. A. Appadurai. Cambridge, Cambridge University Press.
- Bourdieu, P. (2000). "Making the economic habitus: Algerian workers revisted." Ethnography 1(1): 17–41.
- Cliggett, L. (2003). "Gift Remitting and Alliance Building in Zambian Modernity: Old Answers to Modern Problems." American Anthropologist 105(3): 543–552.
- Cliggett, L. (2005). "Remitting the gift: Zambian mobility and anthropological insights for migration studies." Population, Space and Place 11(1): 35–48.
- Cohen, J., R. Jones, et al. (2005). "Why Remittances Shouldn't Be Blamed for Rural Underdevelopment in Mexico: A Collective Response to Leigh Binford." Critique of Anthropology 25(1): 87–96.
- Cohen, J. H. (2001). "Transnational Migration in Rural Oaxaca, Mexico: Dependency, Development, and the Household." American Anthropologist 103(4): 954–967.
- Conway, D. and J. H. Cohen (1998). "Consequences of Migration and Remittances for Mexican Transnational Communities." Economic Geography 74(1): 26–44.
- Conway, D. and J. H. Cohen (2003). "Local Dynamics in Multi-local, Transnational Spaces of Rural Mexico: Oaxacan Experiences." International Journal of Population Geography 9: 141–161.
- Godelier, M. (1999). The Enigma of the Gift. Chicago, The University of Chicago Press.
- Granovetter, M. (1973). The Strength of Weak Ties. American Journal of Sociology 78(6): 1360–1380.
- Helms, M. W. (1998). Tangible Durability. M. W. Helms: 164–173.
- Hernandez, E. and S. Bibler Coutin (2006). "Remitting subjects: migrants, money and states." Economy and Society 35(2): 185–208.
- Levitt, P. (1998). "Social Remittances: Migration Driven Local-Level Forms of Cultural Diffusion." International Migration Review 32(4): 926–948.
- Levitt, P. (2001). The Transnational Villagers. Berkeley, University of California Press.
- Mauss, M. (1990[1950]). The Gift: The Form and Reason for Exchange in Archaic Societies. New York, Norton.
- Piot, Charles. (1999). Remotely Global: Village Modernity in West Africa. Chicago, University of Chicago Press.
- Russell, M. (1984). "Beyond Remittances: The Redistribution of Cash in Swazi Society." The Journal of Modern African Studies 22(4): 595–615.
- Sahlins, M. (1972). Stone Age Economics. New York, Aldine de Gruyter.
- Sykes, K. (2005). Arguing with Anthropology: An Introduction to Critical Theories of the Gift. London, Routledge.
- Trager, L. (1998). "Home-Town Linkages and Local Development in South-Western Nigeria. Whose Agenda? Whose Impact?" Africa 68(3): 360–382.
- Tumama Cowley, E., J. Paterson, et al. (2004). "Traditional Gift Giving Among Pacific Families in New Zealand." Journal of Family and Economic Issues 25(3): 431–444.
- Weiner, A. B. (1992). Inalienable Possessions: The Paradox of Keeping While Giving. Berkeley, University of California Press.
- Wilk, R. R. C., Lisa C. (2007). Economies and Cultures: Foundations of Economic Anthropology. Boulder, University of Colorado.
