= The Fight for Manod =

1979 novel by Raymond Williams

- First edition cover
- Author: Raymond Williams
- Published: Chatto & Windus
- Publication date: 1979
- ISBN: 0-701-20809-0

The Fight for Manod (ISBN 0701208090) is a 1979 novel by Welsh author Raymond Williams.

== Plot summary ==
Matthew Price and Peter Owen both have their roots within the borders of Wales. They each have contributed to a decision on the idea of building a new town, Manod, in the depopulated valleys of South Wales. A splendid idea - or is there more going on behind the scenes than is admitted?

== See also ==
- Border Country - a novel about Matthew Price's earlier life.
- Second Generation - a novel about Peter Owen's earlier life.
