= Journal of Cultural Economy =

Academic journal

- Discipline: Cultural sociology, economic sociology
- Language: English
- Edited by: Liz McFall, Philip Roscoe, Toby Bennett

Publication details
- History: 2008–present
- Publisher: Routledge
- Frequency: Bimonthly
- Impact factor: 0.944 (2017)

Standard abbreviations
- ISO 4: J. Cult. Econ.

Indexing
- ISSN: 1753-0350 (print); 1753-0369 (web)
- OCLC no.: 1043632635

Links
- Journal homepage; Online access; Online archive

The Journal of Cultural Economy is a bimonthly peer-reviewed academic journal covering cultural and economic sociology. It was established in 2008 and is published by Routledge. The editors-in-chief as of February 2026 are Liz McFall (University of Edinburgh), Philip Roscoe (University of St Andrews), and Toby Bennett (University of Westminster). The founding editor was Tony Bennett (then Open University). According to the Journal Citation Reports, the journal had a 2017 impact factor of 0.944.
