= Border Country (novel) =

Novel by Raymond Williams

- First edition
- Author: Raymond Williams
- Language: English
- Publisher: Chatto and Windus
- Publication date: 1960
- Publication place: United Kingdom
- Media type: Print (Hardback & Paperback)
- Pages: 436
- ISBN: 9781902638812
- OCLC: 63765582
- LC Class: PR6073.I4329 B67 2006
- Followed by: Second Generation

Border Country is a novel by Raymond Williams. The book was re-published in December 2005 as one of the first group of titles in the Library of Wales series, having been out of print for several years. Written in English, the novel was first published in 1960.

It is set in rural South Wales, close to the border with England, as demarcated by Offa's Dyke. An academic visits his sick father, who was a railway signalman. There are lengthy flashbacks to the 1920s and 1930s, including the 1926 United Kingdom General Strike and the Great Depression in the United Kingdom. Though fiction, it has many points in common with Raymond Williams's own background.

== Plot summary ==
Matthew Price, a university lecturer in economic history, returns from London to visit his sick father in South Wales. The novel is set in the fictional village of Glynmawr in the Black Mountains, a rural area but closely connected to the nearby coal mining valleys of the South Wales coalfield. His father had been a railway signalman, and the story includes lengthy flashbacks to the 1920s and 1930s, including the General Strike and its impact on a small group of railway workers living in a community made up mostly of farmers. It also describes Matthew Price's decision to leave his own community, studying at Cambridge before becoming a lecturer in London.

== Major themes ==
Themes in the novel include social class, the nature of father/son relationships, the concepts of community and belonging, and migration.

The novel describes the economic changes evident in South Wales through the middle years of the twentieth century, including the decline of primary industries such as coalmining and the area's increasing dependence on manufacturing industry. It also considers the growth of entrepreneurship in the strongly socialist communities of South Wales, the closure of the railways and the place of (and respect for) education in South Wales.

== Literary significance and criticism ==
Although the novel is often considered to be a hymn to working class South Wales, many readers consider parts of it to be an excoriating commentary on the static nature of life in the Valleys. Readers who, like Matthew, have migrated out of Wales frequently sympathise with his inability to escape the entrenched opinions and historical perceptions held by the villagers who remember his childhood and adolescence. Reinforcing the importance of borders to the novel, Matthew comes to notice a stark dividing line between his identity in Wales, where the locals continue to view him as his father's son, and that in England, where he enjoys his own successful academic career.

It is not a novel of dramatic events, but rather one which offers an evocative sense of character and place. Matthew Price's life has many parallels with Raymond Williams's own life and background. The Hogarth Press edition of 1988 catches the spirit of it with a front cover showing the signalman and his son, with the signalman's face recognisably that of Raymond Williams as he then was.

The novel features heavy usage of the distinctive South Wales dialect.

The novel contains two of Williams' most notable quotations:

"a slow and shocking cancellation of the future" - the phrase was popularised by Mark Fisher in his 2009 book Capitalist Realism.

"a life lasts longer than the actual body through which it moves"

== See also ==
- Second Generation
- The Fight for Manod
