= Meaghan Morris =

Australian scholar of cultural studies (born 1950)

Meaghan Morris FAHA (born 5 October 1950) is an Australian scholar of cultural studies. She is Professor Emeritus of Gender and Cultural Studies at the University of Sydney.

== Life ==
Born in Tenterfield, New South Wales, Morris was raised in Newcastle, New South Wales. Morris enrolled in a B.A. program in English and French at the University of Sydney. In Sydney, she met John Flaus, a film theorist and actor famous who would become a significant influence in the development of Australian cultural studies. She also became engaged in the work of British feminist scholar Juliet Mitchell and gave seminars on Mitchell's book Psychoanalysis and Feminism while pursuing a Maîtrise ès Lettres (similar to an MLitt) from the University of Paris-VIII on a French government scholarship between 1976 and 1978. Morris completed her dissertation on Madame de Tencin, a salonniere from the first half of the eighteenth century.

Upon returning to Australia, Morris co-edited two volumes informed by her intellectual experiences in France and also featuring English translations of work by Jean Baudrillard, Gilles Deleuze, Félix Guattari, Luce Irigaray, and Michel Foucault.

Between 1979 and 1985, Morris was chief film critic at the Sydney Morning Herald (1979–1981) and the Australian Financial Review (1981–1985). At the same time, she designed and taught courses in semiotics and film theory at the New South Wales Institute of Technology (now the University of Technology Sydney), Sydney College of the Arts, and Alexander Mackie College.

While holding numerous research and teaching fellowships over the next two decades, Morris did not hold a continuing academic position or have a specific institutional affiliation prior to her appointment in 2000 as founding Chair Professor of Cultural Studies at Lingnan University, Hong Kong. Her contribution to and impact on Australian and international cultural studies has instead been built on a large body of written work and activity as editor of collections and journals. In 1993, she co-edited (with John Frow) Australian Cultural Studies: A Reader (Sydney and Chicago: Allen & Unwin and University of Illinois Press). In 1995, she and anthropologist Stephen Muecke started the journal The UTS Review, which in 2002 became Cultural Studies Review. She received her Doctor of Philosophy in 1996 from the University of Technology, Sydney.

== Awards and recognition ==
Morris was elected a Fellow of the Australian Academy of the Humanities in 1997. In 2012, she was the inaugural inductee to the Cultural Studies Association of Australasia (CSAA) Hall of Fame.

== Works ==
=== Books ===
- Morris, Meaghan (1988). The pirate's fiancée: feminism, reading, postmodernism. London; New York: Verso.
- Morris, Meaghan (1992). Ecstasy and Economics: American Essays for John Forbes. Sydney: EmPress.
- Morris, Meaghan (1998). Too Soon Too Late: History in Popular Culture. Bloomington, Indiana, USA: Indiana University Press.
- Morris, M. (2006). Identity Anecdotes: Translation and Media Culture. New Delhi & London: Sage Publications.

=== Edited books ===
- Morris, Meaghan and Paul Foss, (1978). Language, Sexuality and Subversion. Sydney: Feral Publications.
- Morris, Meaghan and Paul Patton, (1979). Michel Foucault: Power, Truth, Strategy. Sydney: Feral Publications.
- Morris, Meaghan and John Frow, (1993). Australian cultural studies: a reader. St Leonards, NSW: Allen and Unwin.
- Morris, Meaghan and Brett de Bary, (2001). Traces 2: Race Panic and the Memory of Migration. Hong Kong: Hong Kong University Press.
- Bennett, Tony, Lawrence Grossberg and Meaghan Morris, (2005). New Keywords: A Revised Vocabulary of Culture and Society. Oxford: Blackwell Publishers.
- Morris, Meaghan, Siu Leung Li and Stephen Chan Ching-Kiu, (2005). Hong Kong Connections: Transnational Imagination in Action Cinema. Durham & London: Duke University Press.
- Morris, Meaghan and Mette Hjort, (2012). Creativity and Academic Activism: Instituting Cultural Studies. Hong Kong: Hong Kong University Press.
- Morris, Meaghan and Handel K. Wright, (2012). Cultural Studies of Transnationalism. London: Routledge.
- Driscoll, Catherine and Meaghan Morris, (2014). Gender, Media and Modernity in the Asia-Pacific. London: Routledge.
- Hardie, Melissa, Meaghan Morris and Kane Race, (2024) The Year's Work in Showgirls Studies. Bloomington: Indiana University Press.
