= Raymond Williams =

Welsh scholar, critic and Marxist (1921–1988)

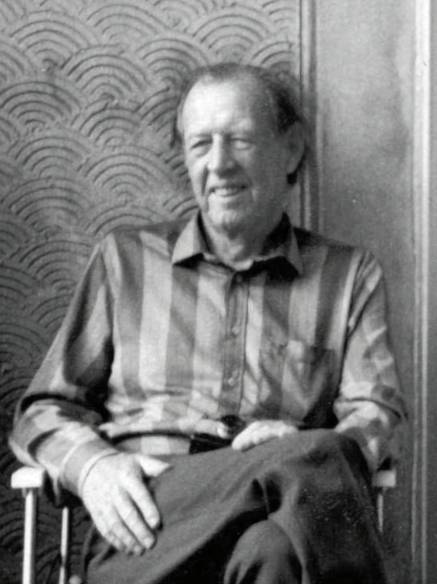
- Williams at Saffron Walden
- Born: Raymond Henry Williams; 31 August 1921; Pandy, Monmouthshire, Wales
- Died: 26 January 1988 (aged 66); Saffron Walden, Essex, England

Academic background
- Education: Trinity College, Cambridge

Academic work
- School or tradition: Marxist sociology New Left
- Institutions: University of Cambridge
- Notable students: Terry Eagleton; David Hare
- Notable ideas: Cultural materialism Mobile privatisation

Raymond Henry Williams (31 August 1921 – 26 January 1988) was a Welsh socialist writer, academic, novelist and critic influential within the New Left and in wider culture. His writings on politics, culture, the media and literature contributed to the Marxist critique of culture and the arts. Some 750,000 copies of his books were sold in UK editions alone, and there are many translations available. His work laid foundations for the field of cultural studies and cultural materialism.

== Life and career ==
=== Early life ===
Born in Pandy, just north of Llanfihangel Crucorney, near Abergavenny, Wales, Williams was the son of a railway worker in a village where all of the railwaymen voted Labour, while the local small farmers mostly voted Liberal. It was not a Welsh-speaking area: he described it as "Anglicised in the 1840s". There was, nevertheless, a strong Welsh identity. "There is the joke that someone says his family came over with the Normans and we reply: 'Are you liking it here?'"

Williams attended King Henry VIII Grammar School in Abergavenny. His teenage years were overshadowed by the rise of Nazism and the threat of war. His father was secretary of the local Labour Party, but Raymond declined to join, although he did attend meetings around the 1935 general election. He was 14 when the Spanish Civil War broke out, and was conscious of what was happening through his membership of the local Left Book Club. He also mentions the Italian invasion of Abyssinia (Ethiopia) and Edgar Snow's Red Star Over China, originally published in Britain by the Left Book Club.

At this time, he supported the League of Nations, attending a League-organised youth conference in Geneva in 1937. On the way back, his group visited Paris and he went to the Soviet pavilion at the International Exhibition. There he bought a copy of The Communist Manifesto and read Karl Marx for the first time.

In July 1939, he was involved in the Monmouth by-election, helping with an unsuccessful campaign by the Labour candidate, Frank Hancock, who was a pacifist. Williams was also a pacifist at this time, having distributed leaflets for the Peace Pledge Union.

=== University education ===
Williams won a state scholarship to read English at Trinity College, Cambridge, matriculating in 1939. While at Cambridge, he joined the Communist Party of Great Britain. Along with Eric Hobsbawm, he was given the task of writing a Communist Party pamphlet about the Russo-Finnish War. He says in (Politics and Letters) that they "were given the job as people who could write quickly, from historical materials supplied for us. You were often in there writing about topics you did not know very much about, as a professional with words".

At the time, the British government was keen to support Finland in its war against the Soviet Union, while still being at war with Nazi Germany. He took a second (division two) in part one of the tripos in 1941, and, after returning from war service, achieved first-class honours in part two in 1946. He graduated from the University of Cambridge with a BA degree in 1946: as per tradition, his BA was promoted to a Master of Arts (MA Cantab) degree. He was later awarded a higher doctorate by Cambridge: the Doctor of Letters (LittD) degree in 1969.

=== World War II ===
Williams interrupted his education to serve in the Second World War. He enlisted in the British Army in late 1940, but stayed at Cambridge to take his exams in June 1941, the month when Germany invaded Russia. Joining the military was against the Communist party line at the time. According to Williams, his Communist Party membership lapsed without him formally resigning.

When Williams joined the army, he was assigned to the Royal Corps of Signals, which was a typical assignment for university undergraduates. He received initial training in military communications, but was reassigned to artillery and anti-tank weapons. He was chosen to serve as an officer in the Anti-Tank Regiment of the Guards Armoured Division in 1941–1945, being sent into early fighting in the Invasion of Normandy after the D-Day Normandy Landings. He writes in Politics and Letters, "I don't think the intricate chaos of that Normandy fighting has ever been recorded." He commanded a unit of four tanks and mentions losing touch with two of them while fighting against Waffen-SS Panzer forces in the bocage. He never discovered what happened to them as a withdrawal of troops ensued.

Williams took part in the fighting from Normandy in 1944 and through Belgium and the Netherlands to Germany in 1945. There he was involved in liberating a Nazi concentration camp which was afterwards used by the Allies to detain SS officers.

He was shocked to find that Hamburg had suffered saturation bombing by the Royal Air Force, not just military targets and docks, as they had been told. He was expecting to be sent to Burma, but as his studies had been interrupted by the war, was instead granted Class B release, which meant immediate demobilisation. He returned to Cambridge, where he found that the student culture had changed from 1941, with the left-wing involvement much diminished.

=== Adult education and early publications ===
Williams received his BA from Cambridge in 1946, and then served as a tutor in adult education at Oxford University's Delegacy for Extra-Mural Studies (1946-1961). Moving to Seaford, Sussex, he gave Workers' Educational Association evening classes in East Sussex in English literature, drama, and later culture and environment. This allowed Williams to write in the mornings, beginning work on novels and what would become cultural studies.

In 1946, he founded the review Politics and Letters, a journal which he edited with Clifford Collins and Wolf Mankowitz until 1948. Williams published Reading and Criticism in 1950; he joined the editorial board of the new journal Essays in Criticism. In 1951, he was recalled to the army as a reservist to fight in the Korean War. He refused to go, registering as a conscientious objector. He expected to be jailed for a month, but the Appeal Tribunal panel, which included a professor of classics, was convinced by his case and discharged him from further military obligations in May 1951.

Between 1946 and 1957, he was involved with the film-maker Michael Orrom, whom he had known in Cambridge. They co-wrote Preface to Film, published in 1954, and Williams wrote the script for an experimental film, The Legend, in 1955. This was rejected in July 1956 and he parted company with Orrom shortly afterwards. He wrote a number of novels in this period, but only one, Border Country, would be published.

Inspired by T. S. Eliot's 1948 publication Notes towards the Definition of Culture, Williams began exploring the concept of culture. He first outlined his argument that the concept emerged with the Industrial Revolution in the essay "The Idea of Culture", which resulted in the widely successful book Culture and Society, published in 1958, in which he coined the term structure of feeling. This was followed in 1961 by The Long Revolution. Williams's writings were taken up by the New Left and received a wide readership. He was also well known as a regular book reviewer for The Manchester Guardian newspaper. His years in adult education were an important experience and Williams was always something of an outsider at Cambridge University. Asked to contribute to a book called My Cambridge, he began his essay by saying: "It was not my Cambridge. That was clear from the beginning."

=== Academic career ===
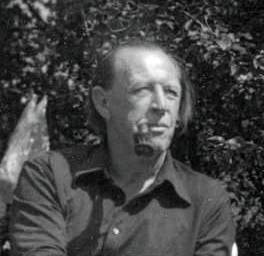
Raymond Williams in 1972

On the strength of his books, Williams was invited to return to Cambridge in 1961, where he was elected a fellow of Jesus College, Cambridge. He eventually achieved an appointment in the Faculty of English, University of Cambridge, first as Reader in Drama (1967–1974), and then as the university's first Professor of Drama (1974–1983). He was a visiting professor of political science at Stanford University in 1973, an experience he used to effect in his still useful book Television: Technology and Cultural Form (1974).

A committed socialist, he was interested in the relations between language, literature and society, and published many books, essays and articles on these and other issues. Among the main ones is The Country and the City (1973), where chapters on literature alternate with chapters on social history. His tightly written Marxism and Literature (1977) is mainly for specialists, but also sets out his approach to cultural studies, which he called cultural materialism. The book was in part a response to structuralism in literary studies and pressure on Williams to make a more theoretical statement of his position, against criticisms that it was a humanist Marxism, based on unexamined assumptions about lived experience. He makes much use of the ideas of Antonio Gramsci, though the book is uniquely Williams's and written in his characteristic voice. For a more accessible version, see Culture (1981-1982), which develops an argument about cultural sociology, which he hoped would become "a new major discipline". Introducing the US edition, Bruce Robbins identifies it as "implicit self-critique" of Williams's earlier ideas, and a basis on which "to conceive the oppositionality of the critic in a permanently fragmented society".

=== Concepts and theory ===
==== Vocabulary ====
Williams was keen to establish the changing meanings of the vocabulary used in discussions of culture. He began with the word culture itself; his notes on 60 significant, often difficult words were to have appeared as an appendix to Culture and Society in 1958. This was not possible, and so an extended version with notes and short essays on 110 words appeared as Keywords in 1976. Those examined included "aesthetic", "bourgeois", "culture", "hegemony", "isms", "organic", "romantic", "status", "violence" and "work". A revised version in 1983 added 21 new words, including "anarchism", "ecology", "liberation" and "sex". Williams wrote that the Oxford English Dictionary (OED) "is primarily philological and etymological," whilst his work was on "meanings and contexts". In 1981, Williams published Culture, where the term, discussed at length, is defined as "a realized signifying system" and supported by chapters on "the means of cultural production, and the process of cultural reproduction". Williams explored the word "freedom" in a short essay reviewing The Concept of Freedom by Christopher Caudwell (St John Sprigg), and in contrast, George Orwell, both as comrades in the Spanish Civil War. Williams remarks that what Caudwell has to say about freedom is clearly said: that men are free through their social relations, and in escape from them, or in the illusion of escape. Williams continues: "in this sense it was right to organise this selection around this title: it is at any rate here that I feel closest to him, and farthest from [George] Orwell."

=== Debate ===
Williams wrote critically of Marshall McLuhan's writings on technology and society. This is the background to a chapter in Television: Technology and Cultural Form (1974) called "The Technology and the Society", where Williams defended his visions against technological determinism, focusing on the prevalence of social over technological in the development of human processes. Thus "Determination is a real social process, but never (as in some theological and some Marxist versions)... a wholly controlling, wholly predicting set of causes. On the contrary, the reality of determination is the setting of limits and the exertion of pressures, within which variable social practices are profoundly affected but never necessarily controlled."

His book Modern Tragedy may be read as a response to The Death of Tragedy by the conservative literary critic George Steiner. Later, Williams was interested in the work of Pierre Bourdieu, although he found it too pessimistic about the possibilities for social change.

=== Last years ===
Williams joined the Labour Party after he moved to Cambridge in 1961, but resigned in 1966 after the new majority Labour government had broken the seafarers' strike and introduced public expenditure cuts. He joined the Vietnam Solidarity Campaign, and wrote the May Day Manifesto (published 1967), along with Edward Thompson and Stuart Hall. Williams later became a Plaid Cymru member and a Welsh nationalist. He retired from Cambridge in 1983 and spent his last years in Saffron Walden. While there he wrote Loyalties, a novel about a fictional group of upper-class radicals attracted to 1930s Communism.

Williams was working on People of the Black Mountains, an experimental historical novel about people who lived or might have lived around the Black Mountains, his own part of Wales, told through flashbacks featuring an ordinary man in modern times, looking for his grandfather, who has not returned from a hill-walk. He imagines the region as it was and might have been. The story begins in the Paleolithic, and would have come up to modern times, focusing on ordinary people. He had completed it to the Middle Ages by the time he died in 1988. The whole work was prepared for publication by his wife, Joy Williams, then published in two volumes with a postscript briefly describing what the remainder would have been. Almost all the stories were complete in typescript, mostly revised many times by the author. Only "The Comet" was left incomplete and needed small additions for a continuous narrative.

In the 1980s, Williams made important links to debates on feminism, peace, ecology and social movements, and extended his position beyond what might be recognised as Marxism. He concluded that with many different societies in the world, there would be not one, but many socialisms. Influenced partly by critical readings of Sebastiano Timpanaro and Rudolf Bahro, he called for convergence between the labour movement and what was then called the ecology movement.

The Raymond Williams Society was founded in 1989 "to support and develop intellectual and political projects in areas broadly connected with Williams's work". Since 1998 it has published Key Words: A Journal of Cultural Materialism, which is "committed to developing the tradition of cultural materialism" he originated.

The Raymond Williams Centre for Recovery Research opened at Nottingham Trent University in 1995.

The Raymond Williams Foundation (RWF) supports activities in adult education; In 2024 the Raymond Williams Foundation offers grants and in 2022 celebrated Williams' centenary. The Foundation was originally formed in 1988 as the Raymond Williams Memorial Fund.

A collaborative research project building on Williams's investigation of cultural keywords called the "Keywords Project", initiated in 2006, is supported by Jesus College, University of Cambridge, and the University of Pittsburgh. Similar projects building on Williams's legacy include the 2005 publication, New Keywords: A Revised Vocabulary of Culture and Society, edited by the cultural-studies scholars Tony Bennett, Lawrence Grossberg, and Meaghan Morris, and the Keywords series from New York University Press including Keywords for American Cultural Studies.

In 2007 a collection of Williams's papers was deposited at Swansea University by his daughter Merryn, a poet and author.

== Works ==
=== Novels ===
- Border Country (Reprinted ed.). London: Hogarth. 1988 [First published 1960]. ISBN 9780701208073.
- Second Generation (Reprint ed.). London: Hogarth Press. 1988 [First published 1964]. ISBN 9780701208080.
- The Volunteers (Reprinted ed.). London: Hogarth. 1985 [First published 1978]. ISBN 9780701210168.
- The Fight for Manod (Reprinted ed.). London: Hogarth. 1988 [First published 1979]. ISBN 9780701208097.
- Loyalties. London: Chatto & Windus. 1985. ISBN 9780701128432.
- People of the Black Mountains 1: The beginning. London: Chatto & Windus. 1989. ISBN 9780701128456.
- People of the Black Mountains 2: The Eggs of the Eagle. London: Chatto & Windus. 1990. ISBN 9780701135645.

=== Literary and cultural studies ===
- Reading and criticism. Man and Society Series. London: Frederick Muller. 1950. ASIN B0000CHNS9. OCLC 443166104.
- Drama from Ibsen to Eliot (Revised ed.). London: Chatto and Windus. 1968 [First published 1952]. OCLC 439658303.
- Williams, Raymond; Orrom, Michael (1954). Preface to film. London: Film Drama Limited. OCLC 982198642.
- Culture and Society (New ed.). New York: Columbia University Press. 1963 [First published 1958]. OCLC 654385116. – new edition with new introduction
- The Long Revolution. Harmondsworth: Penguin. 1965 [First published 1961]. OCLC 876423987. – reissued with additional footnotes
- Communications (3rd ed.). Harmondsworth, Middlesex: Penguin Books. 1973 [First published 1962]. ISBN 9780140208313. – translated into Spanish
- The existing alternatives in communication. Socialism in the Sixties. London: Fabian Society. 1962. OCLC 81185356.
- Modern tragedy (Rev. ed.). London: Verso Editions. 1979 [First published 1966]. ISBN 9780860917113. – new edition, without play Koba and with new afterword
- Hall, S.; Williams, R.; Thompson, E. P., eds. (1967). New Left May Day manifesto. London: May Day Manifesto Committee. OCLC 264038990.
- May Day Manifesto: 1968 (2nd ed.). Harmondsworth: Penguin Books. 1968. OCLC 490859142.
- Drama in performance (Rev. ed.). Milton Keynes: Open University Press. 1991 [First published 1954]. ISBN 9780335096589.
- Drama from Ibsen to Brecht (3rd imprint ed.). London: Hogarth Press. 1993 [First published 1961]. ISBN 9780701210281.
- Williams, Raymond, ed. (1973) [First published 1969]. The Pelican Book of English prose. Vol. 2, From 1780 to the present day. Harmondsworth: Penguin Books. OCLC 750728593.
- The English novel from Dickens to Lawrence (Reprint ed.). London: Hogarth. 1984 [First published 1970]. ISBN 9780701205584.
- Orwell. Fontana Modern Masters (3rd ed.). London: Fontana. 1991 [First published 1971]. ISBN 9780006862277.
- Williams, R. (November–December 1973). "Base and superstructure in Marxist cultural theory". New Left Review. I (82).
- The Country and the City. Nottingham, England: Spokesman Books. 2011 [First published 1973]. ISBN 9780851247991. – translated into Spanish and Portuguese
- Williams, Joy; Williams, Raymond, eds. (1973). D.H. Lawrence on education. Harmondsworth, Middlesex: Penguin Education. ISBN 9780140812022.
- George Orwell: a collection of critical essays. Twentieth Century Views. Englewood Cliffs, N.J.: Prentice-Hall. 1974. ISBN 9780136477013.
- Williams, Raymond (2003) [First published 1971]. Williams, Ederyn (ed.). Television technology and cultural form. Technosphere Series (Routledge classics ed.). London: Routledge. ISBN 978-0415314565. – translated into Traditional Chinese, Italian, Korean and Swedish
- Keywords: A Vocabulary of Culture and Society. Fontana Communications Series. London: Routledge. 2011 [First published 1976]. ISBN 9780203124949.
- Axton, Marie; Williams, Raymond, eds. (2010) [First published 1977]. English drama: forms and development: essays in honour of Muriel Clara Bradbrook. Cambridge: Cambridge University Press. ISBN 9780521142557.
- Marxism and literature. Marxist Introductions Series. Toronto: Oxford University Press. 1977. ISBN 9780198760610. – translated into Portuguese, Spanish, Italian and Korean
- Politics and Letters: Interviews with New Left Review. London: Verso Books. 1981 [First published 1979]. ISBN 9780860917359.
- Problems in materialism and culture: selected essays. London: Verso Books. 1997 [First published 1980]. ISBN 9781859841136. – reissued as Culture and materialism: selected essays (New ed.). London: Verso. 2010 [First published 2005]. ISBN 9781844676637.
- Culture, Fontana New Sociology Series, Glasgow, Collins, 1981. US edition, The Sociology of Culture, New York, Schocken, 1982 – translated into Spanish
- Rossi-Landi, Ferruccio; et al. (1981). William, Raymond (ed.). Contact: human communication and its history. New York: Thames and Hudson. ISBN 9780500012390.
- Socialism and ecology. London: Socialist Environment and Resources Associated. 1983. OCLC 10043180.
- Cobbett. Past Masters series (1st ed.). Oxford: Oxford University Press. 1983. ISBN 9780192875754.
- Towards 2000. Harmondsworth: Penguin Books. 1985 [First published 1981]. ISBN 9780140225341.
- Writing in society. London: Verso Books. 1983. ISBN 9780860910725.
- Williams, Merryn; Williams, Raymond, eds. (1986). John Clare: selected poetry and prose (1st ed.). London: Methuen. ISBN 9780416411201.
- O'Connor, Alan, ed. (2011) [First published 1988]. Raymond Williams on television: selected writings. London: Routledge. ISBN 9780415509299.
- What I came to say. London: Cornerstone Digital. 2013 [First published 1989]. ISBN 9781473505032.
- Resources of Hope: Culture, Democracy, Socialism. London: Verso Books. 1989.
- The Politics of Modernism. Against the New Conformists. London: Verso Books. 1989. – translated into Spanish
- Higgins, John, ed. (2001). The Raymond Williams reader. Oxford: Blackwell. ISBN 9780631213116.
- Milner, Andrew, ed. (2010). Tenses of imagination: Raymond Williams on science fiction, utopia and dystopia. New York: Peter Lang. ISBN 9783039118267.

=== Short stories ===
- "Red Earth", Cambridge Front, No. 2, 1941
- "Sack Labourer", English Short Story 1, W. Wyatt, ed., London: Collins, 1941
- "Sugar", R. Williams, M. Orrom and M. J. Craig, eds, Outlook: a Selection of Cambridge Writings, Cambridge, 1941, pp. 7–14
- "This Time", New Writing and Daylight, No. 2, 1942–1943, J. Lehmann, ed., London: Collins, 1943, pp. 158–164
- "A Fine Room to be Ill In", English Story 8, W. Wyatt (ed.), London, 1948
- "The Writing on the Wall", Colours of a New Day: Writing for South Africa, Sarah LeFanu and Stephen Hayward, eds, London: Lawrence & Wishart, 1990

=== Drama ===
- Koba (1966), Modern Tragedy, London, Chatto and Windus
- A Letter from the Country, BBC Television, April 1966, Stand, 12 (1971), pp. 17–34
- Public Enquiry, BBC Television, 15 March 1967, Stand, 9 (1967), pp. 15–53

=== Introductions ===
- Seven-page introduction to All Things Betray Thee, a novel by Gwyn Thomas

== See also ==
- Anti-capitalism
