= Peggy Levitt =

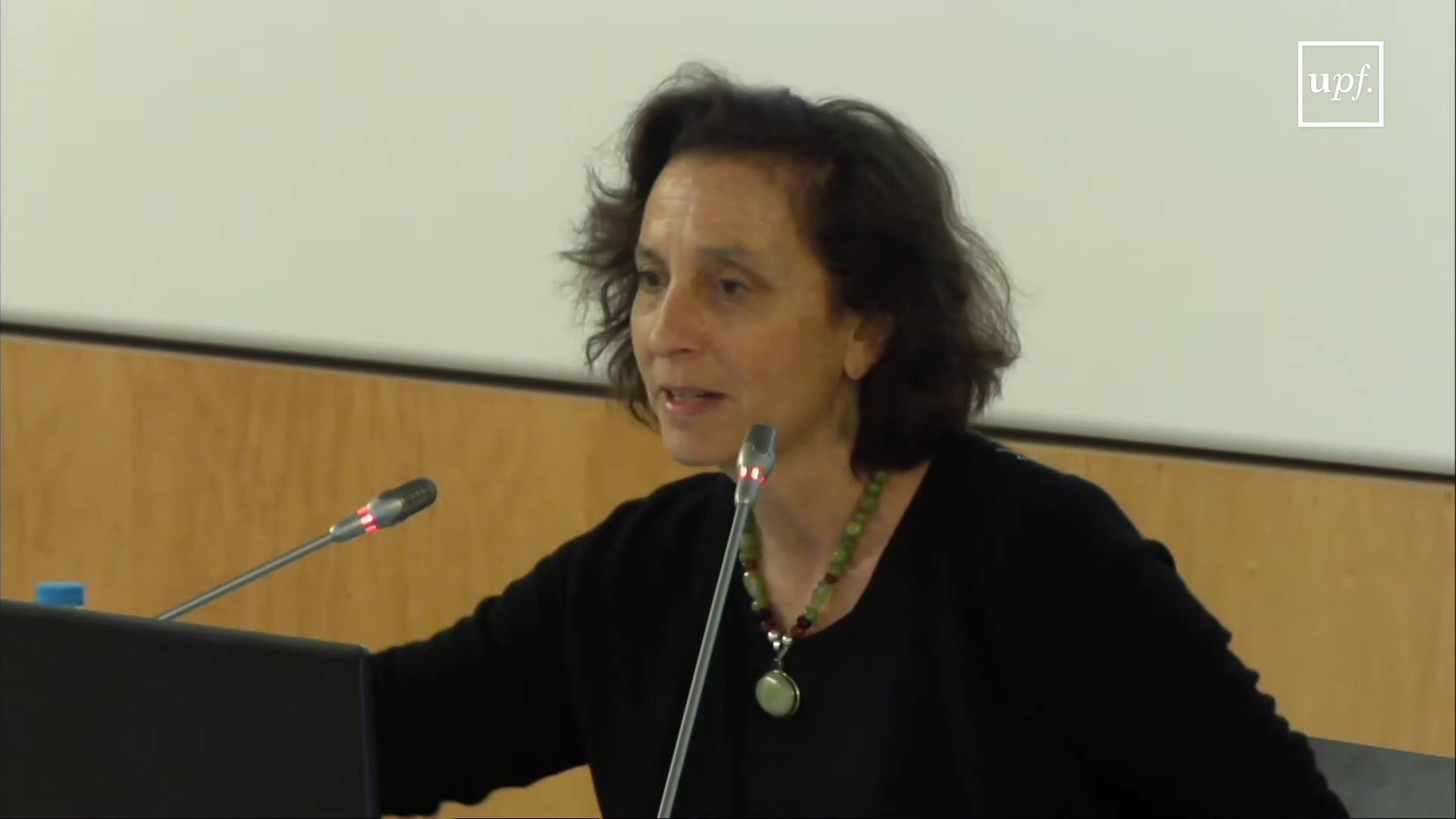
Levitt in 2020.

Peggy Levitt (born September 20, 1957) is an American sociologist and professor. She is the Mildred Lane Kemper Chair of Sociology at Wellesley College and a co-founder of the Global (De)Centre. Her latest book, Transnational Social Protection: Social Welfare Across National Borders (co-authored with Erica Dobbs, Ken Sun, and Ruxandra Paul) was published by Oxford University Press in 2023. Her current book project, Move Over, Mona Lisa. Move Over, Jane Eyre: Making the World's Universities, Museums, and Libraries More Welcoming to Everyone will be published by Stanford University Press. Levitt writes regularly about globalization, arts and culture, immigration, and religion.

== Biography ==
Peggy co-directed the Transnational Studies Initiative and the Politics and Social Change Workshop at the Weatherhead Center for International Affairs at Harvard University from 1998-2020. She received Honorary Doctoral Degrees from the University of Helsinki (2017) and from Maastricht University (2014). She has held numerous fellowships and guest professorships including, most recently, a writing fellowship at the Rockefeller Center in Bellagio, Italy (2024); The Institute for Advanced Studies at the University of Bologna (2024); The Institute for Human Sciences (IWM) in Vienna (2023); The Institute for the Advanced Study of the Humanities (IASH) at the University of Edinburgh (2023); The Institut Convergences Migration in Paris (2022); The European University Institute (2017-2019) and at The Baptist University of Hong Kong (2019).

Her earlier books include Artifacts and Allegiances: How Museums Put the Nation and the World on Display (University of California Press 2015), Religion on the Edge (Oxford University Press 2012), God Needs No Passport (New Press 2007), The Transnational Studies Reader (Routledge 2007), The Changing Face of Home (Russell Sage 2002), and The Transnational Villagers (UC Press 2001).

== Selected Recent Books and Publications ==
=== Books ===
- Transnational Social Protection: Transforming Social Welfare in a World on the Move (with Erika Dobbs, Ken Sun, and Ruxandra Paul). New York and London: Oxford University Press, 2023.
- Artifacts and Allegiances: How Museums Put the Nation and the World on Display. Berkeley and Los Angeles: University of California Press, 2015.
- God Needs No Passport: Immigrants and the Changing American Religious Landscape. New York: The New Press, 2007.
- The Transnational Villagers. Berkeley and Los Angeles: University of California Press, 2001. Awarded Honorable Mention from the International Migration Section of the American Sociological Association and Honorable Mention for the Best Book Award, New England Council on Latin American Studies. Translated and republished as De Baní a Boston: Construyendo Comunidad a través de Fronteras. Instituto Nacional de Migración de la República Dominicana (2021).

=== Recent Edited Collections ===
==== 2020 ====
- Scale Shifting: New Insights into Global Literary Circulation (With Wiebke Sievers) Editor of special volume of Journal of World Literature.
- Cultural Policies in Global South Cities (with Jérémie Molho, Anna Triandafyllidou, and Nicholas Dines.) Editor of special volume of International Journal of Cultural Policy.

=== Articles ===
==== 2023 ====
- "Decolonizing Decoloniality: Decentering Art History and Comparative Literature Classrooms Outside Europe and the United States" (with Ezequiel Saferstein, Rania Jaber, and Doyeon Shin), Comparative Education Review 67(2)
- "Cultures of Cultural Globalization: How National Repertoires and Political Ideologies Affect Literary and Artistic Circulation" (with Andreja Siliunas) Cultural Sociology

==== 2022 ====
- "Producing Korean Literature for Export." (with Bo-Seon Shim), Chinese Journal of Sociology, 9(10): 1-25
- "Cuán "cosmopolita" es la formación en Literatura Comparada? El Caso de Argentina (with Ezequiel Saferstein), Latin American Research Review, 57:278-297.
- "Getting From Buenos Aires to Mexico City Without Passing Through Madrid: Latin American Publishing Topographies" (with Ezequiel Saferstein). Journal of Latin American Cultural Studies, 2022.

==== 2021 ====
- "Becoming a 'Cultural Destination of Choice': lessons on vernacularization from Beirut and Buenos Aires," International Journal of Cultural Policy, Vol 26(6): 756-770

==== 2020 ====
- "Cultural Policies in Cities in the Global South: A multi-scalar approach." (with Jérémie Molho, Nick Dines, and Anna Triandafyllidou.) International Journal of Cultural Policy, Vol 26(6): 711-720
- "Scale Shifting: New Insights into Global Literary Circulation: Introduction" (with Wiebke Sievers.) Journal of World Literature Vol 5(4): 467-480
- "Who's on the Syllabus? World Literature According to the US Pedagogical Canon" (with Kelly Rutherford.) Journal of World Literature 5: 588-611.
- "Imaging the Globe: Remapping the World Through Public Diplomacy at the Asia Society." (with Sarah Smith and Rebecca Smelch.) International Journal of Politics, Culture, and Society
- "Explaining Variations in Scale-Shifting: The Role of Spatiality, Topography, and Infrastructure in Global Literary Fields. Poetics

==== 2019 ====
- "Beyond the West: Barriers to Globalizing Art History" Art History Pedagogy and Practice, Vol 4(1): 1-24.

=== Selected Book Chapters ===
==== 2020 ====
- "Should Museums in Boston, Beirut, and Bangkok All Look Alike?" Reflections on the Global Museum Assemblage, Museum of Modern and Contemporary Art, Seoul, South Korea.

==== 2019 ====
- "Words that Make Worlds." In Ruth Erickson and Eva Respini (Eds.), When Home Won't Let You Stay: Migration Through Contemporary Art, Boston, Mass: Institute of Contemporary Art/Yale University Press, pp. 212–219.

==== 2018 ====
- "Creating National and Global Citizens: What Role Can Museums Play?" In Pieter Bevelander and Christina Johansson (Eds.), Museums in Times of Migration and Mobilities, Lund, Sweden: Nordic Academic Press.
- "Creating Successful Diverse Cities: What Role Can Cultural Institutions Play." In Tiziana Caponio, Peter Scholten, and Ricard Zapta Barrero (Eds.), Cities of Migration, New York and London: Routledge Press.

=== Opinion pieces ===
- The Huffington Post, June 11, 2007, "Transnational Problems Need Transnational Solutions"
- The Huffington Post, June 6, 2007, "Dios Ha Muerto?"
- The Boston Globe, May 27, 2007, "Life, Liberty, and the Folks Back Home"
- The Boston Globe, May 27, 2007, "The Global in the Local"
- The Huffington Post, May 18, 2007, "Religion Isn't One-Size-Fits-All"
- Seattle Post Intelligencer, May 15, 2007, "'Us vs. them' mentality holds us back"
- The New York Times, May 6, 2007, "A Good Provider is One Who Leaves" (letter to the editor)
