= Information culture =

Information culture is closely linked with information technology, information systems, and the digital world. It is difficult to give one definition of information culture, and many approaches exist.

== Overview ==
The literature regarding information culture focuses on the relationship between individuals and information in their work. Curry and Moore are most frequently cited in the information culture literature, and there is consensus of that values accorded to information, and attitudes towards it are indicators of information culture (McMillan et al., 2012; Curry and Moore, 2003; Furness, 2010; Oliver, 2007; Davenport and Prusak, 1997; Widén-Wulff, 2000; Jarvenpaa and Staples, 2001). information culture is a culture that is conducive to effective information management where "the value and utility of information in achieving operational and strategic goals is recognized, where information forms the basis of organizational decision making, and information technology is readily exploited as an enabler for effective information systems". Information culture is a part of the whole organizational culture. It is only by understanding the organisation that progress can be made with information management activities.

Ginman defines information culture as the culture in which the transformation of intellectual resources is maintained alongside the transformation of material resources. Information culture is the environment where knowledge is produced with social intelligence, social interaction and work knowledge. Multinational organizations (MNOs) are characterized by their engagement in global markets. In order to remain competitive in today's global marketplace.

In many organizations, information culture is described as a form of information technology. As Davenport writes, many executives think they solve all information problems with buying IT-equipment. Information culture is about effective information management to use information, not machines, and information technology is just a part of information culture, which has an interactive role in it.

Information culture is the part of organizational culture where evaluation and attitudes towards information depend on the situation in which the organization works. In an organization everyone has different attitudes, but the information profile must be explained, so the importance of information should be realized by executives. The information culture is also about formal information systems (technology), common knowledge, individual information systems (attitudes), and information ethics. information culture does not include written or conscious behavior and what seemingly happening in the organization. Information culture is affected by the behaviors of internal factors of organization more than external factors, which comes in form of information culture, the attitudes and the traditions. Information culture deals with information, information channels, the attitudes, the use and ability to forward or gather information with the environmental circumstances effectively. Knowledge base of any organization can be viewed according to Nonaka's theories about the organizational knowledge production and Cronin & Davenport's theories about the social intelligence. According to these theories it is important to look at the organization information culture how the user uses the information.

Cultural differences need to be understood before information technology developed for an organization in one country can be effectively implemented in an organization in another country. It is well understood that any form of information security technology cannot be properly comprehended and appreciated among user employees without guidelines that focus on the human rather than technical perspective, such as information ethics and national security policy.

A highly developed information culture leads the organization to success and work as a strategic goal that positively associated with organizational practices and performance. Choo et al. looked at information culture as the socially shared patterns of behaviors, norms and values that define the significance and use of information in an organization. Also, scholars like Manuel Castells posits that the information culture transcends the confines of organizations and government participation through policies is relevant for achieving the norms and values. Norms are standards and values are beliefs and together they mold the information behavior as normal that are expected by the people in organization. In so far, information behavior is the reflection of cultural norms and values. Marchand, Kettinger and Rollins identifies six information behaviors and values to profile an organization's information culture:

- Information integrity is defined as the use of information in a trustful and principled manner.
- Information formality is the willingness to use and trust formal information over informal sources.
- Information control is the extent to which information is used to manage and monitor performance.
- Information transparency is the openness in reporting on errors and failures.
- Information sharing is the willingness to provide others with information.
- Proactiveness is actively using new information to innovate and respond quickly to changes.

== Information culture typologies ==
Based on a widely applied construct from Cameron and Quinn that has been used to differentiate organizational culture types and their relationships to organizational effectiveness, Choo develops a typology of information culture. He emphasizes elements from information behavior research. The information culture typologies are characterized by a set of five attributes:

1. the primary goal of information management
2. information values and norms
3. information behaviors in terms of information needs
4. information seeking
5. information use

In addition, Choo classifies information culture into four categories:

1. Relationship-based Culture
2. Risk-taking Culture
3. Result-oriented Culture
4. Rule-following Culture

Relationship-based Culture: information management supports communication, participation, and a sense of identity. Information values and norms emphasize sharing and the proactive use of information. These values promote collaboration and cooperation. The focus is on internal information.

Risk-taking Culture: innovation, creativity, and the exploration of new ideas are encouraged while information is managed. Information values and norms emphasize sharing and the proactive use of information. These values promote innovation, development of new products or capabilities, and the boldness to take the initiative. The focus is on external information. Information is used to identify and evaluate opportunities, and promote entrepreneurial risk-taking.

Result-oriented Culture: information management enables the organization to compete and succeed in its market or sector. Information values and norms call attention to control and integrity: accurate information is valued in order to assess performance and goal attainment. Information is used to understand clients and competitors, and to evaluate results.

Rule-following Culture: information management reinforces the control of internal operations, rules and policies. Information values and norms emphasize control and standardized processes. The focus is on internal information. The organization seeks information about workflows, as well as information about regulatory or accountability requirements. Information is used to control operations, improve efficiency, and provide accountability.

== Information culture in government organization ==
Information governance is beginning to gain traction within organizations, particularly where compliance is a concern, and Davenport and Prusak's models of governance are useful tools to inform the design of information governance. Most public sector organizations in Canada have informal information governance models (or policies) Davenport, Eccles and Prusak have developed four models of information governance, to inform a progression of control. They describe the levels of information governance using political terms: information federalism, information feudalism, information monarchy, and information anarchy. Their observations allow to evaluate the effectiveness of their governance models in terms of information quality, efficiency, commonality, and access.

Oliver's research on three case study organizations found several factors that characterized and differentiated the information cultures were associated with the organizational information management framework, as well as attitudes and values accorded to information. Compliance requirements for the management of information have a significant place in shaping information culture.

Research suggests that poor compliance to formal information governance policies reinforces the fact that sound knowledge and records management practices are often neglected.

Information culture affects support, enthusiasm and cooperation of staff and management of information, asserts Curry and Moore. If such an information culture is critical to the successful management of information assets, then it becomes vital to develop and nurture the commitment from both management and staff at all levels. Curry and Moore have developed an exploratory model of information culture, which included components needed within a strong information culture: effective communication flows, cross-organizational partnerships, co-operative working practices and open access to relevant information, management of information systems in accordance with business strategy, and clear guidelines and documentation for information and data management. Trust is a characteristic that has more recently come to the forefront in literature. The social dynamics between supervisors and workers relies upon trust, or the lack of trust, which will also have an effect on information sharing.

== Information culture and information use ==
Curry and Moore define information culture as "a culture in which the value and utility of information in achieving operational and strategic success is recognised, where information forms the basis of organizational decision making and information technology is readily exploited as an enabler for effective information systems". Information culture is manifested in the organization's values, norms, and practices that affect how information is perceived, created and used. The six information behaviors and values identified by Marchand to characterize the information culture of an organization are information integrity, formality, control, sharing, transparency, and proactiveness. A part of culture that deals specifically with information —the perceptions, values, and norms that people have about creating, sharing, and applying information— has a significant effect on information use outcomes. It is possible to systematically identify behaviors and values that describe an organization's information culture.

It is possible to systematically identify behaviours and values that characterize an organization's information culture, and that this characterization could be helpful in understanding the information use effectiveness of all sorts of organizations, including private businesses, government agencies, and publicly funded institutions such as libraries and museums. A study by Choo and others suggested that organizations might do well to remember that in the rush to implement strategies and systems, information values and information culture will always have a defining influence on how people share and use information.

== Information culture and organizational culture ==
In industrialised countries, most of the diseases and injuries are related to mental health problems and are the main reason of employees absenteeism. There are number of risk factors or stressors that may cause psychological strain and ill health, resulted in occupational stress interventions that occur in isolation, independent of organizational culture. Paying more attention to organizational culture paves the way for a contextualized analysis of stress and distress in the workplace. An integrated framework is used in which the association between organizational culture and mental health is mediated by the work organization conditions that qualify the task environment like information management, information sharing and decision making. Organizational cultures somehow intertwined with the information culture. Information culture is a part of organizational Culture as values, behaviour of employees in the organisation somehow effect the information culture.

The framework links organizational culture to mental health via work organization conditions and is inscribed within the functionalist perspective that views culture as an organizational construct that influences and shapes organizational characteristics. Organizational culture is conceptualized in terms of the four quadrants of the Quinn and Rohrbaugh typology, which are:

1. Group Culture
2. Developmental Culture
3. Hierarchical Culture
4. Rational Culture

By knowing these cultures, organisations can easily adopt the relevant culture according to their work related conditions. Although work organization conditions and organizational culture are closely intertwined, they should not be confounded. Just as societal cultural values would influence organizationally relevant outcomes (Taras, Kirkman, & Steel, 2010), organizational culture might influence work organization conditions. Schein views organizational culture as a multilayered construct that includes artifacts, values, social ideals, and basic assumptions. Artifacts such as behaviors, structures, processes, and technology form a first layer. At a more latent level, organizational culture is noticed in the values and social ideals shared by members of the organization (i.e., ideology of the organization). These values and ideals are revealed in symbolic mechanisms such as myths, rituals, stories, legends, and a codified language, as well as in corporate objectives, strategies, management philosophies, and in the justifications given for these.

Group Culture encourages employees to make suggestions regarding how to improve their own work and overall performance. As a result, the group culture creates an empowering environment in which individuals perceive they have autonomy and influence. Consequently, in the Group Culture, individuals recognize that their work has meaning and that they have the skills to carry it out. Considering also that information sharing is an important feature of employee participation, informational support from leaders is likely to be high in the group culture. Group Culture tends to develop task designs that promote the use of skills and decision authority, which are protective factors and also implement work organization conditions that promote social support whether from colleagues or from supervisors, which thereby have a beneficial influence on employee mental health.

Developmental Culture is helpful to develop decentralised work design that promotes the use of skills and decision authority with benefit to employee mental health. In Developmental Culture, employees are likely to enjoy significant rewards that could have beneficial effects on employee mental health.

Hierarchical Culture is helpful to promote social support and thereby play a beneficial role in employee mental health. In this type of culture, it could well be seniority that determines both compensation and career advancement, giving employees a certain level of job security that could prove beneficial for employee mental health.

Rational Culture with clear performance indicators and measurements is likely to minimize conflicting demands that could be beneficial for employee mental health. So these integrated model can help the organisations and the managers to choose the suitable culture. Integration of organizational culture into occupational stress models is a fruitful avenue to achieve a deeper understanding of occupational mental health problems in the workplace and this framework can also helpful to serve as a starting point for multilevel occupational stress research.

== See also ==
- Social relation
