= We Gotta Get Out of This Place (book) =

1992 book by Lawrence Grossberg

We Gotta Get Out of This Place: Popular Conservatism and Postmodern Culture
- cover
- Author: Lawrence Grossberg
- Publisher: Routledge.
- Publication date: 1992-05-21
- ISBN: 978-0-415-90330-1
- OCLC: 25025877
- Dewey Decimal: 973.9 20
- LC Class: E169.Z82 G757 1992

We Gotta Get Out of This Place: Popular Conservatism and Postmodern Culture by Lawrence Grossberg was published in 1992 and deals with several aspects of (then) contemporary American culture: Lawrence Grossberg states that it is a book about “the political, economic and cultural forces which are producing a new atmosphere, a new kind of dissatisfaction and a new conservatism in American life”. Further, he discusses how commercialization, a lack of passion, and depoliticization causes a new conservatism in rock. A critical review of the book calls it "a highly ambitious and intriguing work, if an ultimately flawed one."

== Introduction, “Rock under siege” ==
Lawrence Grossberg explains that the rising number of attacks on rock music only show the Right's ambiguous relationship to popular culture.

Attacks on rock music are usually produced by Christian fundamentalist movements and an “elitist fraction of a new conservative alliance”, who see rock as the main cause for “a certain fall from grace”.

=== The Increasing Commodification of Rock Music ===
Grossberg distinguishes between more organic forms of rock music, which sometimes characterize the 1960s, for example, and those of the 1980s, whose texts were highly choreographed by the culture industry (record labels, MTV, music magazines, etc.).

=== Conservative Appropriation of Rock Music ===
For Grossberg, the Reagan and Thatcher revival of conservatism can be understood in terms outlined by Antonio Gramsci. A popular hegemony sought to defang the critiques of the counterculture and reinscribe youth culture in the service of corporate capitalism.

On the surface, this form does not resemble an attack but it uses rock music and reconstructs its meanings and significance. Thus, conservative Christian groups can use rock in order to spread their “fundamentalist and conservative messages”.

Grossberg further states that these attacks on rock are actually quite paradoxical, as rock has become “part of a dominant mainstream culture” and thus, “rock is losing power to encapsulate and articulate resistance and opposition””. According to Grossberg, however, the new conservatives try to regulate the “possibilities of pleasure and identity as the basis opposition and to dismantle the cultural and political field constructed in the 1960s".

Professor Michael Gardiner writes, "According to Grossberg, the major consequence of this is that politics in present-day America has become curiously depoliticized. Strictly economic or ideological arguments in favour of the conservative agenda have been replaced by appeals to mood, passion, sentimentality, and so on." Gardiner's review continues: "Yet, at the same time, daily life is repoliticized: the new conservatism seeks to take over the spaces and places within everyday life formerly occupied by youth culture (the body, pleasure/fun, youth) and invest them with new values and meanings. The overarching goal is to submit the practices of daily life to an apparatus of power that is more congenial to the requirements of the emerging post-Fordist economic order. One result is that politics has become largely personalized, just another "lifestyle choice," rather than a site of collective struggle in which popular culture used to play a crucial role:"

Gardiner then quotes Grossberg, "The collapse of all political space, civil society and everyday life and the transformation of everyday life in disciplined mobilization not only depoliticizes large segments of the population, it also eviscerates the recognition of popular culture as a terrain and weapon of struggle."

== Bibliography ==
- Grossberg, Lawrence We Gotta Get out of This Place: Popular Conservatism and Postmodern Culture Routledge. 1992-05-21 ISBN 978-0-415-90330-1.
