= Loyalties (novel) =

1985 novel by Raymond Williams

- First edition
- Author: Raymond Williams
- Cover artist: Barbara Kaiser
- Language: English
- Genre: Historical fiction
- Set in: Wales; Spain; Normandy
- Publisher: Chatto & Windus
- Publication date: 19 September 1985
- Publication place: United Kingdom
- Media type: Print
- Pages: 378p.
- ISBN: 978-0-7011-2843-2
- OCLC: 14270783
- Dewey Decimal: 823/.914
- LC Class: PR6073.I432

Loyalties is a novel by Raymond Williams, first published in 1985.

== Plot ==
A political drama that begins in 1936 and extends to the 1980s. How a small group, some from very privileged backgrounds and some working-class militants, react first to the rise of Fascism, then the war, then the changing of alignments during the Cold War. There is suspicion that some of them were doing a lot more than they admitted to their friends. Suspicions of personal and political betrayal.
