= Politics and Letters: Interviews with New Left Review =

1979 book by Raymond Williams

Politics and Letters
- First edition
- Author: Alan O'Connor
- Language: English
- Subject: Biography of critic Raymond Williams
- Published: 1979
- Publisher: Rowman & Littlefield
- Publication place: United Kingdom
- ISBN: 9780742535503

Politics and Letters: Interviews with New Left Review is critic Raymond Williams's own account of his life and work. The book is based on a series of interviews given by Williams to the magazine New Left Review and was published in 1979.

The work consists of five Sections: "Biography," "Culture," "Drama," "Literature," and "Politics".
