= Lawrence Grossberg =

American academic (born 1947)

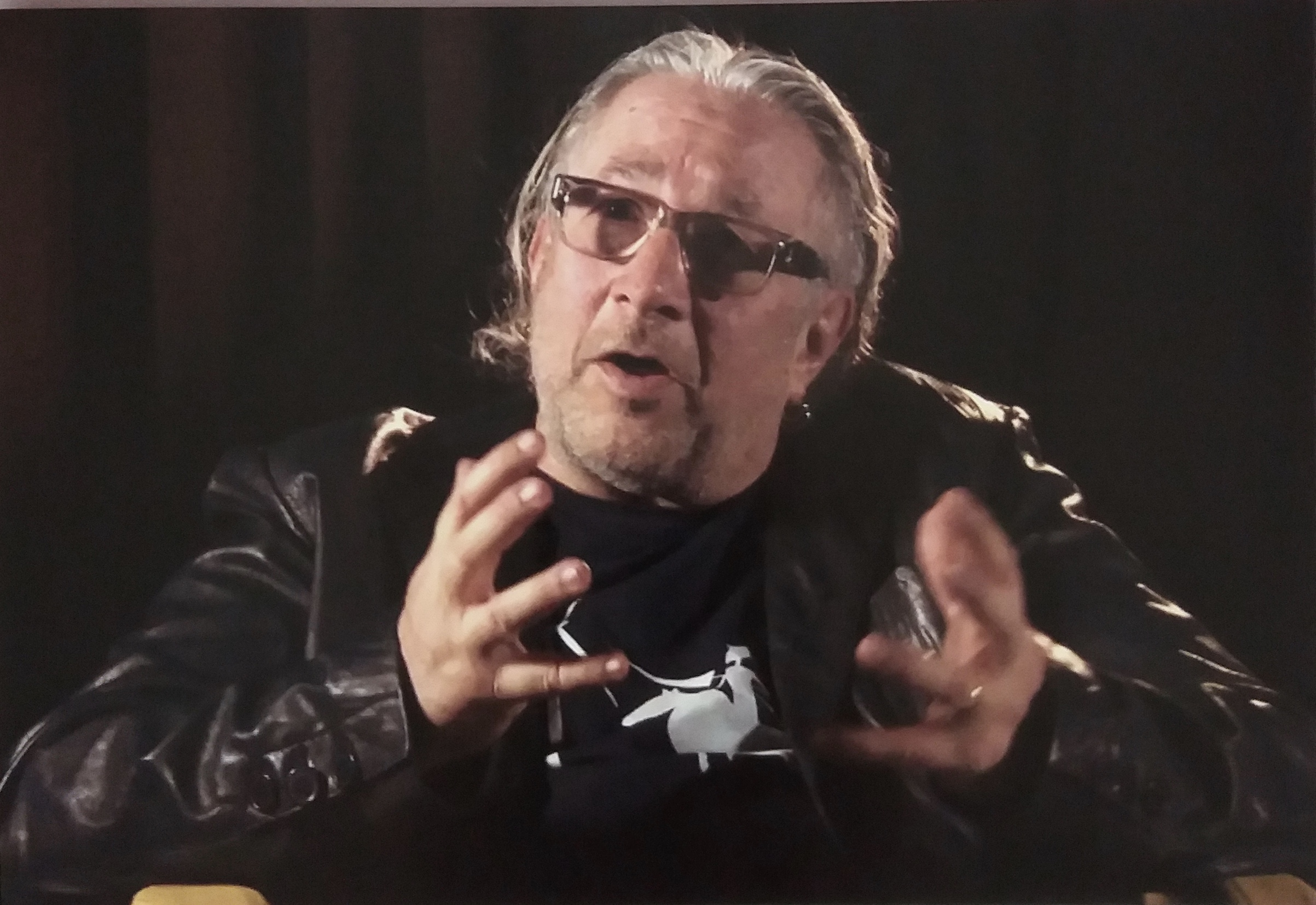
- Lawrence Grossberg
- Born: December 3, 1947 (age 78); New York City, US
- Spouse: Barbara Anne Claypole White

Academic background
- Education: University of Rochester; University of Illinois Urbana-Champaign
- Thesis: Dialectical Hermeneutics and the Human Sciences (1976)
- Academic advisors: Hayden White, Richard Clyde Taylor, Stuart Hall, James W. Carey

Academic work
- Discipline: Cultural Studies; Communication Studies
- Institutions: Purdue University; University of Illinois Urbana-Champaign; University of North Carolina at Chapel Hill

Lawrence Grossberg is an American scholar of cultural studies and theories of culture. He helped introduce and define cultural studies—an interdisciplinary intellectual study of the intersections of culture and power through practices of contextuality, complexity, and contingency—into the United States. His theoretical works attempt to bring together the constructionists of Stuart Hall, Martin Heidegger, Michel Foucault, and Gilles Deleuze and Felix Guattari.

He was among the first academic intellectuals to take seriously the challenges of understanding the relations of popular music and post-war youth cultures. His argument that popular music worked through uniquely “affective” forms of communication—and his attempts to theorize affect—helped open the concept to broader and more rigorous study and debate.

In cultural studies, his work focuses on the relations of popular and political cultures. He has produced a series of studies that attempt to offer what he calls "better stories" about the changing political culture and conjunctural struggles of the U.S. since the 1960s. These studies follow the contests among various conservative, reactionary, and progressive political movements—and the affective logics driving them—to construct livable stories around crises of modernity. He argues that the contemporary post-war American conjuncture, especially its (increasingly affective) political culture, has been shaped by two distinct organic crises. Grossberg argues that both these crises problematize liberalism and modernity in the face of their presumed failures. The first seeks what Grossberg calls "better ways of being modern"; the second seeks ways of being something other than modern. The first accepts the modern project; the second rejects it.

== Biography ==
Lawrence Grossberg was born on December 3, 1947. He grew up in Brooklyn, New York, in an upwardly mobile, second-generation immigrant Jewish family, suffering from a congenital orthopedic disability. He attended Stuyvesant High School. In 1968 he graduated summa cum laude in history and philosophy from the University of Rochester, where he studied with Hayden White, Richard Taylor, and Lewis Beck. Afterwards, he studied with Richard Hoggart and Stuart Hall at the Centre for Contemporary Cultural Studies at the University of Birmingham, England.

After two years of traveling through Europe with Les Treteaux Libres, a French-speaking theater company, Grossberg returned to the United States for doctoral studies at the Institute of Communications Research, with James W. Carey, at the University of Illinois Urbana-Champaign. He received his Ph.D. in Communication Research in 1976. His dissertation was an attempt to bring together Martin Heidegger's phenomenology and the work of key cultural studies figures.

Grossberg taught briefly at Purdue University in West Lafayette, Indiana (1975‒1976) before returning to the University of Illinois as Assistant Professor of Speech Communication. At the University of Illinois, he helped found the Unit for Criticism and Interpretive Theory. He moved to the University of North Carolina at Chapel Hill in 1994 as the Morris Davis Distinguished Professor of Communication Studies, where he also held appointments in American Studies, Anthropology, and Geography. There he helped establish the University Program in Cultural Studies. He retired as Emeritus Distinguished Professor of Communication in 2022.

In 1988, Grossberg married Barbara Anne Claypole White and in 1994, their son, Zachariah Nigel Claypole White was born (with Stuart Hall as one of his godparents). Barbara is novelist; Zachariah is a poet and short-story writer.

Grossberg has published 11 books and more than 250 essays and interviews, and has edited ten books in English. Internationally, he is recognized as one of the leading figures in cultural studies. He edited the international journal Cultural Studies for thirty years (1990‒2019) and has served on more than forty editorial boards. He was a founding member of the Association for Cultural Studies and an invited founding member of the Global University. He has lectured all over the world.

Throughout his career, Grossberg directed more than sixty doctoral students. He has received numerous honors and awards for scholarship, teaching, and mentorship from the National Communication Association, the International Communication Association, the Association for Cultural Studies, and the University of North Carolina at Chapel Hill.

== Key ideas ==
=== Affect ===
For Grossberg, affect is a crucial type or plane of cultural effects. It is what one might normally call "feelings," but encompasses a variety of discourses, each producing specific qualities and intensities. These include emotions, passions, attention, moods, outlooks, sentiments, desires, longings, concerns or what matters, belongings or identifications, states of energy (such as panic and calm), etc. He describes affect as "what gives 'color,' 'tone,' or 'texture' to the lived."

Grossberg treats affect as a kind of glue that binds relations, helping create unities from heterogeneous elements in a social field (while stories, he says, are another kind of glue that define those connections, the relations among the elements). Affect constitutes a sense of these unities as a livable landscape that social actors, institutions, and other agents navigate. For Grossberg affect is always organized into specific architectures or "affective formations." Affective formations define the social landscape's vitality—the "livedness" of social existence. In short, these affective formations constitute the ways people are attuned to the world. And they hold back—even tame—chaotic forces threatening to de-unify (disarticulate, or prise apart) that livable landscape.

In more recent work, Grossberg uses the phrase "quasi-autonomy of affect" to describe a specific historical development: the increasing distance between (or separation of) the relations between affective formations and other cultural formations. As the relations have become weaker, the taken-for-granted, intimate connection between affects and other cultural effects (especially the meanings and values to which they have been almost always attached) has been broken, disarticulated. The affective dimension has become ever more independent or autonomous. The result is that both (1) culture has become almost entirely affective and (2) the livable landscape is becoming an affective landscape.

Grossberg has stated that he developed his notion of affect in part from his early reading of Raymond Williams (particularly Williams' concept of "structures of feeling") and Richard Hoggart (who once described the cultural studies project as the work of explaining "what it feels like to be alive at a particular time and place").

== Bibliography ==
=== Books authored ===
- Grossberg, Lawrence (1989). It's a sin: essays on postmodernism, politics, and culture. Sydney: Power Publications. ISBN 9780909952150.
- Grossberg, Lawrence (1992). We gotta get out of this place: popular Conservatism and postmodern culture. New York: Routledge. ISBN 9780415903301.
- Grossberg, Lawrence (1997). Dancing in spite of myself: essays on popular culture. Durham, North Carolina: Duke University Press. ISBN 9780822319177.
- Grossberg, Lawrence (1997). Bringing it all back home: essays on cultural studies. Durham, North Carolina: Duke University Press. ISBN 9780822319160.
- Grossberg, Lawrence (2005). Caught in the crossfire: kids, politics, and America's future. Boulder, Colorado: Paradigm Publishers. ISBN 9781594511134.
- Grossberg, Lawrence; Wartella, Ellen A.; Whitney, D. Charles; Wise, J. Mcgregor (2005). Media making: mass media in a popular culture (2nd ed.). Thousand Oaks, California: SAGE. ISBN 9780761925439.
- Grossberg, Lawrence (2010). Cultural studies in the future tense. Durham, North Carolina: Duke University Press. ISBN 9780822348306.
- Grossberg, Lawrence (2015). We all want to change the world: The paradox of the U.S. left (a polemic). ISBN 9781910448496.
- Grossberg, Lawrence (2018). Under the cover of chaos: Trump and the battle for the American right. London: Pluto Press. ISBN 9780745337913.
- Grossberg, Lawrence (2024). On the way to theory. Durham: Duke University Press. ISBN 9781478030850.
- Grossberg, Lawrence (2025). What's going on? The struggle for contemporary American identity. Routledge. ISBN 9781041119999.

=== Books edited ===
- Grossberg, Lawrence; Nelson, Cary (1988). Marxism and the interpretation of culture. Urbana: University of Illinois Press. ISBN 978-0-252-01401-7.
- Grossberg, Lawrence; Dervin, Brenda; Wartella, Ellen A.; O'Keefe, Brenda J. (1989). Rethinking communication, vol. I: paradigm issues. Thousand Oaks, California: SAGE. ISBN 978-0-8039-3029-2.
- Grossberg, Lawrence; Dervin, Brenda; Wartella, Ellen A. (1989). Rethinking communication, vol. II: paradigm exemplars. Thousand Oaks, California: SAGE. ISBN 978-0-8039-3031-5.
- Grossberg, Lawrence; Nelson, Cary; Treichler, Paula (1992). Cultural studies. New York: Routledge. ISBN 978-0-415-90345-5.
- Grossberg, Lawrence; Firth, Simon; Goodwin, Andrew (1993). Sound and Vision: The music video reader. London: Routledge. ISBN 978-0-04-445605-6.
- Grossberg, Lawrence; Hay, James; Wartella, Ellen A. (1996). The audience and its landscapes. Boulder, Colorado: Westview Press. ISBN 978-0-8133-2285-8.
- Grossberg, Lawrence; McRobbie, Angela; Gilroy, Paul (2000). Without guarantees: In honour of Stuart Hall. London: Verso. ISBN 9781859842874.
- Grossberg, Lawrence; Bennett, Tony; Meaghan, Morris (2005). New keywords: a revised vocabulary of culture and society. Malden: Blackwell. ISBN 978-0-631-22569-0.
- Seidl, Monica; Horak, Roman; Grossberg, Lawrence, eds. (2009). About Raymond Williams. New York: Routledge. ISBN 9780415545808.
- Hall, Stuart (2016). Slack, Jennifer Daryl; Grossberg, Lawrence (eds.). Cultural studies 1983: A theoretical history. Durham: Duke University Press. ISBN 9780822362630.
