= Counter-flow =

Cultural spread

Counter-flow (also called contraflow) is the movement of culture running counter to the traditional dominant-to-dominated ("West to rest") cultural adaptation patterns. In a contraflow situation, cultural elements brought into a society by immigrants become accepted and popular among the society at large. Examples include the worldwide popularity of Latin American telenovelas, Japanese anime and Korean K-Pop.

== History ==
Unlike transculturation, counter-flows (or contra-flow) is not the mixing or meshing of two cultures. Rather, contra-flow is about the movement of cultures, like a two-way traffic lane, where individuals are said to live "between cultures". The term contra-flow originated from the preceding peripheries of global media industries, designated "sub-altern flows". More importantly, contra-flows emerged because of the global mass media reversing the dominant Western, First World direction, in other words it is no longer from "the West to the rest", It can also be said that counter-flows originated because of colonization and later on because of diaspora. The existence of this diaspora – which is on the point of becoming the largest “minority” in the U.S. and which will eventually constitute the majority group in America's largest state, California – has encouraged the rapid rise of Spanish-language channels such as Telemundo and Univision.

Colonization brought a new language and religious beliefs to the Americas. On the one hand, a new way of living was taken in by the indigenous people, but on the other, they retained part of their language that is still used today such as the words "maize" and "aguacate", among others. Additionally, just like the indigenous people, colonizers acquired something from the colonized; they brought back with them goods from the Americans such as potatoes and corn. Through colonization, we can see counter-flows being born and take action because of the consumption, fluidity, and flexibility of culture in both directions, from the colonizer to the colonized and vice versa.

== Example of contra-flow media ==
Contra or counter-flows, through media, have had a positive and negative impact on migrant communities. As mentioned before, counter-flows is the movement of culture, not only one way but a two-way movement. Furthermore, media is a major source of communication and information that reaches hundreds of homes across the country. The term counter-flows is especially applied and seen in the Latino communities located all throughout the United States.

A positive example of contra-flow media are telenovelas or soap operas. Telenovelas have become global because of the leading producers of telenovelas such as Televisa in Mexico, Venevision in Venezuela, and Globo TV in Brazil, reaching hundreds of homes all around the globe. Through these leading networks, migrant communities are able to obtain information and watch entertainment shows from their native land.

Yo Soy Betty La Fea, a telenovela originally from Colombia, has become a success not only in its native country but in more than seventy countries in three different continents. In the United States, for example, the telenovela aired on the Telemundo network for Latino communities in the United States. After its grand success, other United States networks became interested in creating or remaking the telenovela by naming it Ugly Betty, but for an English-speaking audience. However, the producers of Ugly Betty made sure to still maintain the plot and some of the main characteristics from the original Yo Betty La Fea telenovela to retain the Hispanic fans and audience. By maintaining some of the characteristics, producers hope that the English-speaking Latino communities are able to relate with the main character, Betty, because she is a Latino woman living in the United States with an immigrant father.

Yo Soy Betty La Fea is a great example of contra-flow media because of the increasing exportation of telenovelas to the United States and other countries not familiar or culturally similar to Latin America. Ugly Betty also shows the reverse media imperialism which is "the term focused on the one-way flow of information from the United States to the rest of the world with complete disregard for the importance of counter-flows generated by television exporters in other parts of the world".

=== Al-Jazeera ===
Another example of contra-flow media is the Qatari-based news outlet Al-Jazeera. The outlet is among the first channels to contest the monopoly of Western-dominated global TV news journalism. Founded in 1996 and introducing its English-language sister channel in 2006, the station provides an Arab point of view on international news and current events. The station was applauded for its pioneering role in heralding and popularizing such concepts as political debate, press freedom and Western journalistic standards in the Arab world. It has also been praised for its ‘relative’ independence from political influences, even though it still is a state-financed station.

The news outlet made an ambitious attempt at breaking into the American market in 2013, and aimed to compete with the established news outlets. Al-Jazeera America was taken off the air in 2016, with the reason cited as the current "economic landscape." The failure of Al-Jazeera America shows how challenging it is for non-American based networks to gain traction and establish legitimacy in the United States. The hostile media environment and tendency of Americans to selectively expose themselves to media that fits their viewpoint is another factor cited in a 2015 study conducted by Tal Samuel-Azran and Tsahi Hayat. The study examined the network's Twitter following, and showed that 42 percent of Al-Jazeera America's followers did not follow any other US news outlet, and that most of the remaining 58 percent followed liberal stations.

== La Mara Salvatrucha as counter-flows ==
La Mara Salvatrucha is a negative example of counter-flow. This Latin gang originated from Los Angeles California after Salvadoran migrants left their country in the early 1980s due to the civil war. La Mara Salvatrucha (or MS-13) has a reputation of being the world's most dangerous gang. The flow of La Mara Salvatrucha gang members between the United States and El Salvador has created a transnational empire of power and control supported by violence. Members from MS-13 keep in constant contact with members in El Salvador. Among the criminal activities that they operate in both the US an El Salvador are robbery, muggings, extortion, drug trafficking, the distribution of weapons, human trafficking and murder. They are protective with their business empire while keeping in touch through technology. According to Tina Strickland the gang members stay in contact by "using disposable cell phones and the Internet, both of which are readily available at low cost". Many of the members do not have technological skills, but there are programs that help them navigate.

=== La Mara in the media ===
Through technology, the media has exposed society to issues that are occurring around the world. The media does not hesitate to expose violence through the news, Internet and newspaper magazines. The printing industry and images are a navigation chain to reach out to the world, and La Mara has been on top of the negative exposure. La Mara's exposure to the world has created fear among society. The gang's history has appeared in different airings, from Fox News Channel, and Gangland on the History Channel. According to Strickland, "Deportations have helped create an 'unending chain' of gang members moving between the U.S. and Central America. ... it's a merry-go-round". Till this day the Salvadoran gang MS-13 is still considered a transnational group through their back and forth movement.

== Related to counter-flows (or contra-flow) ==
=== Subaltern flows ===
This idea is mentioned by Daya Kishan Thussu in his 2012 article "Mapping Global Media Flow and Contra-Flow". He described the subaltern flows as "originators of transnational media flows have a strong regional presence but are also aimed at audiences outside their primary constituency." To better describe "subaltern flows", he mentioned the CCTV-9 as an example. CCTV-9 is an English language network of China Central Television broadcasting since 2011 because the official language used there is English. The potential viewers of CCTV-9 are in two major groups, the foreigner in China and the overseas Chinese. As Thussu argued in 2012: "the expansion of CCTV-9, reflects the recognition by the Beijing authorities of the importance of the English language as the key to success for global commerce and communication and their strategy to bring Chinese public diplomacy to a global audience."

=== Dominant flows ===
Thussu explained this idea in his article "Mapping Global Media Flow and Contra-Flow" as "the US-led Western media, both online and offline, and in various forms –information, infotainment and entertainment – are global in their reach and influence." He also provides three examples of "dominant media flows" in his article which is media from the United States that "available across the global"; media from Britain which is a "major presence in global media, particularly in the field of news and current affairs"; and Japanese animation which is "the only non-Western genre". However, more recent research has also discussed K-pop and Korean Hallyu as becoming another dominant non-Western genre. These are all considered as major dominant media flows that have extended their influence in a global content.
