= International Journal of Cultural Policy =

- Language: English
- Edited by: Oliver Bennett

Publication details
- Former name(s): The European Journal of Cultural Policy
- History: 1994-present
- Publisher: Routledge
- Frequency: 5/year

Standard abbreviations
- ISO 4: Int. J. Cult. Policy

Indexing
- ISSN: 1028-6632 (print); 1477-2833 (web)
- OCLC no.: 40215302

Links
- Journal homepage

International Journal of Cultural Policy is a peer-reviewed academic journal covering interdisciplinary research on the meaning, function and impact of cultural policies. The journal is published by Routledge and the editor-in-chief is Oliver Bennett.

The International Conference on Cultural Policy Research, a biannual research conference, is organised in association with the International Journal of Cultural Policy. The journal currently has an impact factor of 1.3 and is classified as a Q1 journal as of 2023.

== Abstracting and indexing ==
The journal is abstracted and indexed in:

- Arts & Humanities Citation Index
- British Humanities Index
- CSA Worldwide Political Science Abstracts
- Current Contents/Arts & Humanities
- Current Contents/Social & Behavioral Sciences
- Scopus
- Social Sciences Citation Index
- Sociological Abstracts
