= List of acts of the Parliament of the United Kingdom from 1899 =

This is a complete list of acts of the Parliament of the United Kingdom for the year 1899.

Note that the first parliament of the United Kingdom was held in 1801; parliaments between 1707 and 1800 were either parliaments of Great Britain or of Ireland). For acts passed up until 1707, see the list of acts of the Parliament of England and the list of acts of the Parliament of Scotland. For acts passed from 1707 to 1800, see the list of acts of the Parliament of Great Britain. See also the list of acts of the Parliament of Ireland.

For acts of the devolved parliaments and assemblies in the United Kingdom, see the list of acts of the Scottish Parliament, the list of acts of the Northern Ireland Assembly, and the list of acts and measures of Senedd Cymru; see also the list of acts of the Parliament of Northern Ireland.

The number shown after each act's title is its chapter number. Acts passed before 1963 are cited using this number, preceded by the year(s) of the reign during which the relevant parliamentary session was held; thus the Union with Ireland Act 1800 is cited as "39 & 40 Geo. 3 c. 67", meaning the 67th act passed during the session that started in the 39th year of the reign of George III and which finished in the 40th year of that reign. Note that the modern convention is to use Arabic numerals in citations (thus "41 Geo. 3" rather than "41 Geo. III"). Acts of the last session of the Parliament of Great Britain and the first session of the Parliament of the United Kingdom are both cited as "41 Geo. 3". Acts passed from 1963 onwards are simply cited by calendar year and chapter number.

All modern acts have a short title, e.g. the Local Government Act 2003. Some earlier acts also have a short title given to them by later acts, such as by the Short Titles Act 1896.

== 62 & 63 Vict. ==
The fifth session of the 26th Parliament of the United Kingdom, which met from 7 February 1899 until 9 August 1899.

=== Public general acts ===
Short title	Citation	Royal assent
Long title
Partridge Shooting (Ireland) Act 1899 (repealed)	62 & 63 Vict. c. 1	27 March 1899
An Act to change the Date of the Season for Partridge Shooting in Ireland. (Repealed by Game Law Amendment Act (Northern Ireland) 1951 (c. 4 (N.I.)))
Consolidated Fund (No. 1) Act 1899 (repealed)	62 & 63 Vict. c. 2	27 March 1899
An Act to apply certain sums out of the Consolidated Fund to the service of the years ending on the thirty-first day of March one thousand eight hundred and ninety-eight, one thousand eight hundred and ninety-nine, and one thousand nine hundred. (Repealed by Statute Law Revision Act 1908 (8 Edw. 7. c. 49))
Army (Annual) Act 1899 (repealed)	62 & 63 Vict. c. 3	27 April 1899
An Act to provide, during twelve months, for the Discipline and Regulation of the Army. (Repealed by Statute Law Revision Act 1908 (8 Edw. 7. c. 49), Statute Law Revision Act 1950 (14 Geo. 6. c. 6) and Revision of the Army and Air Force Acts (Transitional Provisions) Act 1955 (3 & 4 Eliz. 2. c. 20))
Solicitors Act 1899 (repealed)	62 & 63 Vict. c. 4	6 June 1899
An Act to amend the Solicitors Acts. (Repealed for England and Wales by Solicitors Act 1932 (22 & 23 Geo. 5. c. 37) and for Northern Ireland by Solicitors Act (Northern Ireland) 1938 (2 Geo. 6. c. 14 (N.I.)))
Public Libraries (Scotland) Act 1899 (repealed)	62 & 63 Vict. c. 5	6 June 1899
An Act to amend the Public Libraries (Scotland) Acts. (Repealed by Local Government (Scotland) Act 1973 (c. 65))
Supreme Court of Judicature Act 1899 (repealed)	62 & 63 Vict. c. 6	6 June 1899
An Act to amend the Law with respect to the hearing of Appeals and Motions by the Court of Appeal. (Repealed by Supreme Court of Judicature (Consolidation) Act 1925 (15 & 16 Geo. 5. c. 49))
Metropolis Water Act 1899 (repealed)	62 & 63 Vict. c. 7	6 June 1899
An Act to enable and require the Metropolitan Water Companies to supply each other with Water in cases of emergency. (Repealed by Statute Law (Repeals) Act 1973 (c. 39))
Infectious Disease (Notification) Extension Act 1899 (repealed)	62 & 63 Vict. c. 8	20 June 1899
An Act to extend the Infectious Disease (Notification) Act, 1889, (Note: Infectious Disease (Notification) Act 1889 (52 & 53 Vict. c. 72)) to Districts in which it has not been adopted. (Repealed by Public Health Act 1936 (26 Geo. 5 & 1 Edw. 8. c. 49))
Finance Act 1899	62 & 63 Vict. c. 9	20 June 1899
An Act to grant certain Duties of Customs and Inland Revenue, to alter other duties, and to amend the Law relating to Customs and Inland Revenue, and to make other provision for the financial arrangements of the year.
Parish Councillors (Tenure of Office) Act 1899 (repealed)	62 & 63 Vict. c. 10	20 June 1899
An Act to enable Parish Councillors to hold Office for Three Years. (Repealed by Local Government Act 1933 (23 & 24 Geo. 5. c. 51))
Fine or Imprisonment (Scotland and Ireland) Act 1899 (repealed)	62 & 63 Vict. c. 11	13 July 1899
An Act to assimilate the Law of Scotland and of Ireland as to Imprisonment in default of Payment of Fines to that of England. (Repealed for Scotland by Summary Jurisdiction (Scotland) Act 1954 (2 & 3 Eliz. 2. c. 48) and for Northern Ireland by Statute Law Revision Act 1908 (8 Edw. 7. c. 49), Re-equipment of Industry (Amendment) Act (Northern Ireland) 1953 (c. 8 (N.I.)) and Statute Law Revision Act (Northern Ireland) 1954 (c. 35 (N.I.)))
Reformatory Schools Act 1899 (repealed)	62 & 63 Vict. c. 12	13 July 1899
An Act to amend the Law with regard to Reformatory Schools. (Repealed by Children Act 1908 (8 Edw. 7. c. 67))
Elementary Education (School Attendance) Act (1893) Amendment Act 1899 (repealed)	62 & 63 Vict. c. 13	13 July 1899
An Act to amend the Law respecting the Employment and Education of Young Children. (Repealed by Education Act 1918 (8 & 9 Geo. 5. c. 39))
London Government Act 1899 (repealed)	62 & 63 Vict. c. 14	13 July 1899
An Act to make better provision for Local Government in London. (Repealed by Local Law (Greater London Council and Inner London Boroughs) Order 1965 (SI 1965/540))
Metropolis Management Acts Amendment (Byelaws) Act 1899 (repealed)	62 & 63 Vict. c. 15	1 August 1899
An Act to amend the provisions of the Metropolis Management Acts with respect to Byelaws. (Repealed by Public Health (London) Act 1936 (26 Geo. 5 & 1 Edw. 8. c. 50) and Statute Law Revision Act 1950 (14 Geo. 6. c. 6))
Gordon Memorial College at Khartoum Act 1899	62 & 63 Vict. c. 16	1 August 1899
An Act to give powers to the Executive Committee of the Gordon Memorial College at Khartoum to invest Trust Funds in certain Securities.
Tithe Rentcharge (Rates) Act 1899 (repealed)	62 & 63 Vict. c. 17	1 August 1899
An Act to amend the Law with respect to the Payment of Rates on Tithe Rentcharge attached to a Benefice. (Repealed by Local Government Act 1929 (19 & 20 Geo. 5. c. 17))
Congested Districts Board (Ireland) Act 1899 (repealed)	62 & 63 Vict. c. 18	1 August 1899
An Act to amend certain provisions of the Land Law (Ireland) Act, 1896, (Note: Land Law (Ireland) Act 1896 (59 & 60 Vict. c. 47)) affecting the Congested Districts Board, and to make further provision for the expenses of that Board out of money provided by Parliament. (Repealed by Purchase of Land (Ireland) Act 1901 (1 Edw. 7. c. 3), Irish Land Act 1903 (3 Edw. 7. c. 37), Statute Law Revision Act 1908 (8 Edw. 7. c. 49) and Statute Law Revision Act 1950 (14 Geo. 6. c. 6))
Electric Lighting (Clauses) Act 1899 (repealed)	62 & 63 Vict. c. 19	9 August 1899
An Act for incorporating in one Act certain provisions usually contained in Provisional Orders made under the Acts relating to Electric Lighting. (Repealed by Electricity Act 1989 (c. 29))
Bodies Corporate (Joint Tenancy) Act 1899	62 & 63 Vict. c. 20	9 August 1899
An Act for enabling Bodies Corporate to hold Property in Joint Tenancy.
Seats for Shop Assistants Act 1899 (repealed)	62 & 63 Vict. c. 21	9 August 1899
An Act to provide for Seats being supplied for the use of Shop Assistants. (Repealed by Shops Act 1912 (2 & 3 Geo. 5. c. 3))
Summary Jurisdiction Act 1899 (repealed)	62 & 63 Vict. c. 22	9 August 1899
An Act to amend the Summary Jurisdiction Act, 1879. (Note: Summary Jurisdiction Act 1879 (42 & 43 Vict. c. 49)) (Repealed by Magistrates' Courts Act 1952 (15 & 16 Geo. 6 & 1 Eliz. 2. c. 55))
Anchors and Chain Cables Act 1899 (repealed)	62 & 63 Vict. c. 23	9 August 1899
An Act to simplify and amend the Law relating to the Testing and Sale of Anchors and Chain Cables. (Repealed by Anchors and Chain Cables Act 1967 (c. 64))
University of London Act 1899 (repealed)	62 & 63 Vict. c. 24	9 August 1899
An Act to amend the University of London Act, 1898, (Note: University of London Act 1898 (61 & 62 Vict. c. 62)) with respect to Holloway College. (Repealed by Statute Law (Repeals) Act 1977 (c. 18))
Land Tax Commissioners Names Act 1899 (repealed)	62 & 63 Vict. c. 25	9 August 1899
An Act to appoint additional Commissioners for executing the Acts for granting a Land Tax and other Rates and Taxes. (Repealed by Statute Law Revision Act 1964 (c. 79))
Metropolitan Police Act 1899	62 & 63 Vict. c. 26	9 August 1899
An Act to amend the Law with respect to the Salaries and Allowances of the Commissioner, Receiver, and Assistant Commissioners of the Metropolitan Police.
Marriages Validity Act 1899	62 & 63 Vict. c. 27	9 August 1899
An Act to remove doubts as to the Validity of certain Marriages. (Repealed for England and Wales by Marriage Act 1949 (12, 13 & 14 Geo. 6. c. 76))
Manchester Canonries Act 1899 (repealed)	62 & 63 Vict. c. 28	9 August 1899
An Act to amend section twenty of the Parish of Manchester Division Act, 1850. (Note: Parish of Manchester Division Act 1850 (13 & 14 Vict. c. 41)) (Repealed by Cathedrals Measure 1963 (No. 2))
Baths and Washhouses Act 1899 (repealed)	62 & 63 Vict. c. 29	9 August 1899
An Act to amend the Baths and Washhouses Acts. (Repealed by Public Health Act 1936 (26 Geo. 5 & 1 Edw. 8. c. 49))
Commons Act 1899	62 & 63 Vict. c. 30	9 August 1899
An Act to amend the Inclosure Acts 1845 to 1882 and the Law relating to Commons and Open Spaces.
Public Works Loans Act 1899 (repealed)	62 & 63 Vict. c. 31	9 August 1899
An Act to grant Money for the purpose of certain Local Loans and for other purposes relating to Loans out of the Local Loans Fund. (Repealed by National Loans Act 1968 (c. 13))
Elementary Education (Defective and Epileptic Children) Act 1899 (repealed)	62 & 63 Vict. c. 32	9 August 1899
An Act to make better provision for the Elementary Education of Defective and Epileptic Children in England and Wales. (Repealed by Education Act 1921 (11 & 12 Geo. 5. c. 51))
Board of Education Act 1899 (repealed)	62 & 63 Vict. c. 33	9 August 1899
An Act to provide for the Establishment of a Board of Education for England and Wales, and for matters connected therewith. (Repealed by Education Act 1944 (7 & 8 Geo. 6. c. 31))
Expiring Laws Continuance Act 1899 (repealed)	62 & 63 Vict. c. 34	9 August 1899
An Act to continue various Expiring Laws. (Repealed by Statute Law Revision Act 1908 (8 Edw. 7. c. 49))
Inebriates Act 1899 (repealed)	62 & 63 Vict. c. 35	9 August 1899
An Act to amend the Inebriates Act, 1898. (Note: Inebriates Act 1898 (61 & 62 Vict. c. 60)) (Repealed by Statute Law (Repeals) Act 1976 (c. 16))
Colonial Loans Act 1899 (repealed)	62 & 63 Vict. c. 36	9 August 1899
An Act to authorise certain Public Loans to certain Colonies or Places. (Repealed by National Loans Act 1968 (c. 13))
Poor Law Act 1899 (repealed)	62 & 63 Vict. c. 37	9 August 1899
An Act to amend Section One of the Poor Law Act, 1889, (Note: Poor Law Act 1889 (52 & 53 Vict. c. 56)) and Section Four of the Pauper Inmates Discharge and Regulation Act, 1871. (Note: Pauper Inmates Discharge and Regulation Act 1871 (34 & 35 Vict. c. 108)) (Repealed for England and Wales by Poor Law Act 1927 (17 & 18 Geo. 5. c. 14) and for Northern Ireland by Children and Young Persons Act (Northern Ireland) 1950 (c. 5 (N.I.)))
Telegraph Act 1899 (repealed)	62 & 63 Vict. c. 38	9 August 1899
An Act to make further Provision for the Improvement of Telephonic Communication, and otherwise with respect to Telegraphs. (Repealed by Communications Act 2003 (c. 21))
Isle of Man (Customs) Act 1899 (repealed)	62 & 63 Vict. c. 39	9 August 1899
An Act to amend the Law with respect to Customs Duties in the Isle of Man. (Repealed by Isle of Man (Customs) Act 1927 (17 & 18 Geo. 5. c. 20))
Reserve Forces Act 1899 (repealed)	62 & 63 Vict. c. 40	9 August 1899
An Act to amend the Law relating to the Reserve Forces. (Repealed by Army Reserve Act 1950 (14 Geo. 6. c. 32) and Air Force Reserve Act 1950 (14 Geo. 6. c. 33))
Military Works Act 1899 (repealed)	62 & 63 Vict. c. 41	9 August 1899
An Act to make further Provision for Defraying the Expenses of certain Military Works and other Military Services. (Repealed by Statute Law Revision Act 1950 (14 Geo. 6. c. 6))
Naval Works Act 1899 (repealed)	62 & 63 Vict. c. 42	9 August 1899
An Act to make further provision for the construction of Works in the United Kingdom and elsewhere for the purposes of the Royal Navy, and to amend the Law with respect to the construction and use of Tramways for Naval Purposes. (Repealed by Defence (Transfer of Functions) (No. 1) Order 1964 (SI 1964/488))
Royal Niger Company Act 1899 (repealed)	62 & 63 Vict. c. 43	9 August 1899
An Act to make provision for certain Payments to be made in connection with the Revocation of the Charter of the Royal Niger Company. (Repealed by Nigeria (Remission of Payments) Act 1937 (1 Edw. 8 & 1 Geo. 6. c. 63))
Small Dwellings Acquisition Act 1899 (repealed)	62 & 63 Vict. c. 44	9 August 1899
An Act to empower Local Authorities to advance Money for enabling Persons to acquire the Ownership of Small Houses in which they reside. (Repealed for England and Wales by Housing (Consequential Provisions) Act 1985 (c. 71) and for Scotland by Tenants' Rights, Etc. (Scotland) Act 1980 (c. 52))
Patriotic Fund Act 1899 (repealed)	62 & 63 Vict. c. 45	9 August 1899
An Act to amend the Patriotic Fund Act, 1881, (Note: Patriotic Fund Act 1881 (44 & 45 Vict. c. 46)) and the Patriotic Fund Act, 1886. (Note: Patriotic Fund Act 1886 (49 & 50 Vict. c. 30)) (Repealed by Patriotic Fund Reorganisation Act 1903 (3 Edw. 7. c. 20))
Improvement of Land Act 1899	62 & 63 Vict. c. 46	9 August 1899
An Act to amend the enactments relating to the improvement of land. (Repealed for Scotland by Abolition of Feudal Tenure etc. (Scotland) Act 2000 (asp 5))
Private Legislation Procedure (Scotland) Act 1899 (repealed)	62 & 63 Vict. c. 47	9 August 1899
An Act to provide for improving and extending the Procedure for obtaining Parliamentary Powers by way of Provisional Orders in matters relating to Scotland. (Repealed by Private Legislation Procedure (Scotland) Act 1936 (26 Geo. 5 & 1 Edw. 8. c. 52))
Lincolnshire Coroners Act 1899 (repealed)	62 & 63 Vict. c. 48	9 August 1899
An Act to constitute the Divisions of Lincolnshire separate Counties for all the purposes of the Coroners Acts. (Repealed by Local Government Act 1972 (c. 70))
Appropriation Act 1899 (repealed)	62 & 63 Vict. c. 49	9 August 1899
An Act to apply a sum out of the Consolidated Fund to the service of the year ending on the thirty-first day of March one thousand nine hundred, and to appropriate the Supplies granted in this Session of Parliament. (Repealed by Statute Law Revision Act 1908 (8 Edw. 7. c. 49))
Agriculture and Technical Instruction (Ireland) Act 1899	62 & 63 Vict. c. 50	9 August 1899
An Act for establishing a Department of Agriculture and other Industries and Technical Instruction in Ireland, and for other purposes connected therewith.
Sale of Food and Drugs Act 1899 (repealed)	62 & 63 Vict. c. 51	9 August 1899
An Act to amend the Law relating to the sale of Food and Drugs. (Repealed for England and Wales and Scotland by Food and Drugs (Adulteration) Act 1928 (18 & 19 Geo. 5. c. 31) and for Northern Ireland by Food and Drugs Act (Northern Ireland) 1958 (c. 27 (N.I.)))

=== Local acts ===
Short title	Citation	Royal assent
Long title
Rushden and Higham Ferrers District Gas Act 1899	62 & 63 Vict. c. i	6 June 1899
An Act for incorporating and conferring powers on the Rushden and Higham Ferrers District Gas Company.
Ilford Urban District Council (Rates) Act 1899 (repealed)	62 & 63 Vict. c. ii	6 June 1899
n Act to empower the Urban District Council of the Urban District of Ilford to make further provision in regard to the future collection of the local rates and for other purposes. (Repealed by Local Law (North East London Boroughs) Order 1965 (SI 1965/510))
Aberdeen Harbour Act 1899 (repealed)	62 & 63 Vict. c. iii	6 June 1899
An Act to confer further powers upon the Aberdeen Harbour Commissioners. (Repealed by Aberdeen Harbour Order Confirmation Act 1960 (9 & 10 Eliz. 2. c. i))
Herne Bay Water Act 1899	62 & 63 Vict. c. iv	6 June 1899
An Act for conferring further powers upon the Herne Bay Waterworks Company and for other purposes.
Walton-on-Thames and Weybridge Gas Company Act 1899 (repealed)	62 & 63 Vict. c. v	6 June 1899
An Act to authorise the Walton-on-Thames and Weybridge Gas Company to raise additional capital and for other purposes. (Repealed by Wandsworth and District Gas (No. 2) Order 1936 (SR&O 1936/783))
Crowborough District Gas Act 1899 (repealed)	62 & 63 Vict. c. vi	6 June 1899
An Act for supplying with Gas the District of Crowborough in the County of Sussex and adjacent places. (Repealed by Tunbridge Wells Gas Order 1929 (SR&O 1929/346))
St. David's Water and Gas Act 1899	62 & 63 Vict. c. vii	6 June 1899
An Act for supplying with Water and Gas the City of St. David's and adjacent places.
Clay Cross Water Act 1899 (repealed)	62 & 63 Vict. c. viii	6 June 1899
An Act for transferring to the Clay Cross Urban District Council the undertaking of the Clay Cross Waterworks Company and for empowering the Clay Cross Urban District Council to supply Water within their District and for other purposes. (Repealed by North Derbyshire Water Board Order 1962 (SI 1963/660))
Glasgow District Subway (Additional Capital) Act 1899	62 & 63 Vict. c. ix	6 June 1899
An Act to authorise the Glasgow District Subway Company to raise additional capital and for other purposes.
Loughborough and Sheepshead Railway Act 1899	62 & 63 Vict. c. x	6 June 1899
An Act for making a Railway in the County of Leicester from the London Extension of the Great Central Railway at Loughborough to the Urban District of Sheepshed and for other purposes.
Dublin Improvement (Bull Alley Area) Act 1899	62 & 63 Vict. c. xi	6 June 1899
An Act to authorise the improvement of the area bounded by Patrick Street Bride's Alley Bride Street and Bull Alley in the City of Dublin and the erection thereon of Workmen's Dwellings and other Buildings to vest the same and the control thereof in a body of Trustees to empower the Corporation of Dublin to carry out certain Street Widenings and for other purposes.
Bristol Floods Prevention Act 1899	62 & 63 Vict. c. xii	6 June 1899
An Act to enable the Mayor Aldermen and Burgesses of the City of Bristol to construct a Culvert and other Works for the relief of the floods in the Cutlers Mills Brook and for other purposes.
Perth Water Police and Gas Act 1899	62 & 63 Vict. c. xiii	6 June 1899
An Act to authorise the construction of additional waterworks for the City of Perth and places adjacent for conferring further borrowing powers for the purposes of the construction of the bridge and certain other works and the gasworks authorised by the Perth Harbour City Improvements and Gas Act 1897 (Note: Perth Harbour City Improvements and Gas Act 1897 (60 & 61 Vict. c. xlix)) and for other purposes.
Vale of Glamorgan Railway Act 1899	62 & 63 Vict. c. xiv	6 June 1899
An Act for conferring further powers on the Yale of Glamorgan Railway Company for the raising of capital and otherwise in relation to their undertaking and for other purposes.
Wallasey Tramways and Improvements Act 1899	62 & 63 Vict. c. xv	6 June 1899
An Act to authorise the Wallasey Urban District Council to construct Tramways Street Improvements and Promenades and for other purposes.
Northern Assurance Act 1899 (repealed)	62 & 63 Vict. c. xvi	6 June 1899
An Act to extend the objects of and to confer further powers on the Northern Assurance Company and for other purposes. (Repealed by Northern Assurance Act 1908 (8 Edw. 7. c. lxvi))
Tenterden Railway Act 1899	62 & 63 Vict. c. xvii	6 June 1899
An Act for conferring further powers on the Tenterden Railway Company with reference to the construction of new railways the abandonment of authorised railways and for other purposes.
Surrey Commercial Dock Act 1899 (repealed)	62 & 63 Vict. c. xviii	6 June 1899
An Act to extend the time limited for the compulsory purchase of lands authorised to be acquired by the Surrey Commercial Dock Company and for other purposes. (Repealed by Port of London (Consolidation) Act 1920 (10 & 11 Geo. 5. c. clxxiii))
Horsforth Urban District Council Waterworks Act 1899	62 & 63 Vict. c. xix	6 June 1899
An Act to enable the Urban District Council of the Horsforth Urban District in the West Riding of the County of York to acquire the Undertaking of the Horsforth Waterworks Company and to supply Water to the said District and adjacent places and for other purposes.
Burley-in-Wharfedale Urban District Water Act 1899	62 & 63 Vict. c. xx	6 June 1899
An Act to empower the Urban District Council of Burley-in-Wharfedale in the township of Burley in the parish of Otley in the West Riding of the County of York to construct and maintain additional waterworks and for other purposes.
Nuneaton and Chilvers Coton Urban District Council Waterworks Act 1899	62 & 63 Vict. c. xxi	6 June 1899
An Act to authorise the Nuneaton and Chilvers Coton Urban District Council to construct additional Waterworks and for other purposes.
Woodhouse and Conisbrough Railway (Abandonment) Act 1899 (repealed)	62 & 63 Vict. c. xxii	6 June 1899
An Act for the abandonment of the Woodhouse and Conisbrough Railway. (Repealed by Statute Law (Repeals) Act 2013 (c. 2))
Coalville Urban District Gas Act 1899	62 & 63 Vict. c. xxiii	6 June 1899
An Act to provide for the transfer of the undertaking of the Whitwick and Coalville Gas Company to the Coalville Urban District Council and to authorise that Council, to supply Gas and for other purposes.
Glastonbury Water Act 1899	62 & 63 Vict. c. xxiv	6 June 1899
An Act to authorise the Mayor Aldermen and Burgesses of the borough of Glastonbury to construct Waterworks for the supply of the borough and for other purposes.
Queen's Ferry Bridge Act 1899 (repealed)	62 & 63 Vict. c. xxv	6 June 1899
An Act to authorise the County Council of Flint to raise a further sum of money for the completion of the Queen's Ferry Bridge. (Repealed by Clwyd County Council Act 1985 (c. xliv))
Education Department Provisional Order Confirmation (Swansea) Act 1899	62 & 63 Vict. c. xxvi	6 June 1899
An Act to confirm a Provisional Order made by the Education Department under the Elementary Education Acts 1870 to 1893 to enable the School Board for the United School District of Swansea in the county of Glamorgan to put in force the Lands Clauses Acts.
	Swansea (Glamorgan) School Board Order 1899 Provisional Order for putting in force the Lands Clauses Acts.	
Metropolitan Police Provisional Order Confirmation Act 1899 (repealed)	62 & 63 Vict. c. xxvii	6 June 1899
An Act to confirm a Provisional Order made by one of Her Majesty's Principal Secretaries of State under the Metropolitan Police Act 1886 (Note: Metropolitan Police Act 1886 (49 & 50 Vict. c. 22)) relating to lands in the parishes of St. Marylebone Lee St. John Horsleydown St. Mary Stratford Bow and St. John at Hackney. (Repealed by Statute Law (Repeals) Act 2008 (c. 12))
	Order made by the Secretary of State under the Metropolitan Police Act 1886.	
Local Government Board's Provisional Orders Confirmation (No. 1) Act 1899	62 & 63 Vict. c. xxviii	6 June 1899
An Act to confirm certain Provisional Orders of the Local Government Board relating to Manchester Middlesbrough Nelson Southampton and Stafford.
	Manchester Order (No. 1) 1899 Provisional Order for altering a Confirming Act. (Note: Local Government Board's Provisional Orders Confirmation (No. 12) Act 1893 (56 & 57 Vict. c. cxxx))	
	Middlesbrough Order 1899 Provisional Order for partially repealing and altering a Local Act. (Note: Middlesbrough Improvement Act 1856 (19 & 20 Vict. c. lxxvii))	
	Nelson Order 1899 Provisional Order for altering a Confirming Act. (Note: Local Government Board's Provisional Orders Confirmation (No. 18) Act 1895 (59 Vict. Sess. 2. c. xii))	
	Southampton Order 1899 Provisional Order for altering a Confirming Act. (Note: Local Government Board's Provisional Orders Confirmation (No. 11) Act 1891 (54 & 55 Vict. c. cvii))	
	Stafford Order 1899 Provisional Order for altering the Stafford Corporation Act 1896. (Note: Stafford Corporation Act 1896 (59 & 60 Vict. c. lxiii))	
St. Andrews Burgh Order Confirmation Act 1899	62 & 63 Vict. c. xxix	6 June 1899
An Act to confirm a Provisional Order under the Burgh Police (Scotland) Act 1892 (Note: Burgh Police (Scotland) Act 1892 (55 & 56 Vict. c. 55)) reducing the number of magistrates and councillors in the Royal Burgh of St. Andrews.
	St. Andrews Burgh Order 1899 Provisional Order.	
Broughty Ferry Gas and Paving Order Confirmation Act 1899 (repealed)	62 & 63 Vict. c. xxx	20 June 1899
An Act to confirm a Provisional Order under the Burgh Police (Scotland) Act 1892 relating to Broughty Ferry Gas Supply and Paving. (Repealed by Dundee Boundaries Act 1913 (3 & 4 Geo. 5. c. lxxx))
	Broughty Ferry Gas and Paving Order 1899 Provisional Order.	
Education Department Provisional Orders Confirmation (Aberavon, &c.) Act 1899	62 & 63 Vict. c. xxxi	20 June 1899
An Act to confirm certain Provisional Orders made by the Education Department under the Elementary Education Acts 1870 to 1893 to enable the School Boards for Aberavon Croydon Walthamstow and Willesden to put in force the Lands Clauses Acts.
	Aberavon (Glamorgan) School Board Order 1899 Provisional Order for putting in force the Lands Clauses Acts.	
	Croydon (Surrey) School Board Order 1899 Provisional Order for putting in force the Lands Clauses Acts.	
	Walthamstow (Essex) School Board Order 1899 Provisional Order for putting in force the Lands Clauses Acts.	
	Willesden (Middlesex) School Board Order 1899 Provisional Order for putting in force the Lands Clauses Acts.	
Pilotage Order Confirmation Act 1899 (repealed)	62 & 63 Vict. c. xxxii	20 June 1899
An Act to confirm a Provisional Order made by the Board of Trade under the Merchant Shipping Act 1894 (Note: Merchant Shipping Act 1894 (57 & 58 Vict. c. 60)) relating to the Llanelly and Burry Pilotage District. (Repealed by Pilotage Orders Confirmation (No. 5) Act 1921 (11 & 12 Geo. 5. c. cxii))
Farnley Tyas Marriages Legalization Act 1899 (repealed)	62 & 63 Vict. c. xxxiii	20 June 1899
An Act for legalizing Marriages heretofore solemnized in the Church of Farnley Tyas in the West Riding of York. (Repealed by Statute Law (Repeals) Act 1977 (c. 18))
Electric Lighting Orders Confirmation (No. 1) Act 1899	62 & 63 Vict. c. xxxiv	20 June 1899
An Act to confirm certain Provisional Orders made by the Board of Trade under the Electric Lighting Acts 1882 (Note: Electric Lighting Act 1882 (45 & 46 Vict. c. 56)) and 1888 (Note: Electric Lighting Act 1888 (51 & 52 Vict. c. 12)) relating to Castleford East Barnet Yalley Grays Thurrock Mexborough Sutton Coldfield and Worksop.
	Castleford Electric Lighting Order 1899 Provisional Order granted by the Board of Trade under the Electric Lighting Acts 1882 and 1888 to the Urban District Council of Castleford.	
	East Barnet Valley Electric Lighting Order 1899 Provisional Order granted by the Board of Trade under the Electric Lighting Acts 1882 and 1888 to the East Barnet Valley Urban District Council.	
	Grays Thurrock Electric Lighting Order 1899 Provisional Order granted by the Board of Trade under the Electric Lighting Acts 1882 and 1888 to the Urban District Council of Grays Thurrock.	
	Mexborough Electric Lighting Order 1899 Provisional Order granted by the Board of Trade under the Electric Lighting Acts 1882 and 1888 to the Urban District Council of Mexborough.	
	Sutton Coldfield Electric Lighting Order 1899 Provisional Order granted by the Board of Trade under the Electric Lighting Acts 1882 and 1888 to the Mayor Aldermen and Burgesses of the Borough of Sutton Coldfield.	
	Worksop Electric Lighting Order 1899 Provisional Order granted by the Board of Trade under the Electric Lighting Acts 1882 and 1888 to the Urban District Council of Worksop.	
Electric Lighting Orders Confirmation (No. 2) Act 1899	62 & 63 Vict. c. xxxv	20 June 1899
An Act to confirm certain Provisional Orders made by the Board of Trade under the Electric Lighting Acts 1882 and 1888 relating to Aylesbury Hartlepool Mansfield Wath-upon-Dearne and Winsford.
	Aylesbury Electric Lighting Order 1899 Provisional Order granted by the Board of Trade under the Electric Lighting Acts 1882 and 1888 to the Urban District Council of Aylesbury in respect of the Urban District of Aylesbury in the County of Buckingham.	
	Hartlepool Corporation Electric Lighting Order 1899 Provisional Order under the Electric Lighting Acts 1882 and 1888 to the Mayor Aldermen and Burgesses of the Borough of Hartlepool in respect of the Borough of Hartlepool in the County of Durham.	
	Mansfield Corporation Electric Lighting Order 1899 Provisional Order granted by the Board of Trade under the Electric Lighting Acts 1882 and 1888 to the Mayor Aldermen and Burgesses of the Borough of Mansfield in the County of Nottingham in respect of the said Borough.	
	Wath-upon-Dearne Electric Lighting Order 1899 Provisional Order granted by the Board of Trade under the Electric Lighting Acts 1882 and 1888 to the Urban District Council of Wath-upon-Dearne in respect of the Urban District of Wath-upon-Dearne in the West Riding of the County of York.	
	Winsford Electric Lighting Order 1899 Provisional Order granted by the Board of Trade under the Electric Lighting Acts 1882 and 1888 to the Winsford Urban District Council in respect of the Urban District of Winsford in the County of Chester.	
Electric Lighting Orders Confirmation (No. 4) Act 1899	62 & 63 Vict. c. xxxvi	20 June 1899
An Act to confirm certain Provisional Orders made by the Board of Trade under the Electric Lighting Acts 1882 and 1888 relating to Audenshaw Bexley Glossop Rhyl Rugby and Runcorn.
	Audenshaw Electric Lighting Order 1899 Provisional Order granted by the Board of Trade under the Electric Lighting Acts 1882 and 1888 to the Urban District Council of Audenshaw in respect of the Urban District of Audenshaw in the County of Lancaster.	
	Bexley Electric Lighting Order 1899 Provisional Order granted by the Board of Trade under the Electric Lighting Acts 1882 and 1888 to the Urban District Council of Bexley in respect of the Urban District of Bexley in the County of Kent.	
	Glossop Corporation Electric Lighting Order 1899 Provisional Order granted by the Board of Trade under the Electric Lighting Acts 1882 and 1888 to the Mayor Aldermen and Burgesses of the Borough of Glossop in respect of the Borough of Glossop in the County of Derby.	
	Rhyl Electric Lighting Order 1899 Provisional Order granted by the Board of Trade under the Electric Lighting Acts 1882 and 1888 to the Urban District Council of Rhyl in respect of the Urban District of Rhyl in the County of Flint.	
	Rugby Electric Lighting Order 1899 Provisional Order granted by the Board of Trade under the Electric Lighting Acts 1882 and 1888 to the Urban District Council of Rugby in respect of the Urban District of Rugby in the County of Warwick.	
	Runcorn Electric Lighting Order 1899 Provisional Order granted by the Board of Trade under the Electric Lighting Acts 1882 and 1888 to the Urban District Council of Runcorn in respect of the Urban District of Runcorn in the County of Chester.	
Metropolitan Commons (Harrow Weald) Supplemental Act 1899	62 & 63 Vict. c. xxxvii	20 June 1899
An Act to confirm a Scheme relating to Harrow Weald Common in the Parish of Harrow Weald in the County of Middlesex.
	Harrow Weald Common Order 1899 Scheme with respect to Harrow Weald Common.	
Brigg Urban District Gas Act 1899	62 & 63 Vict. c. xxxviii	20 June 1899
An Act to empower the Urban District Council of Brigg to supply gas and to provide for the transfer of the undertaking of the Brigg Gas Company Limited to the Council and for other purposes.
Norfolk Estuary Act 1899 (repealed)	62 & 63 Vict. c. xxxix	20 June 1899
An Act to amend the Norfolk Estuary Act 1877. (Note: Norfolk Estuary Act 1877 (40 & 41 Vict. c. cciii)) (Repealed by Norfolk Estuary Act 1964 (c. xx))
Cambridge University and Town Gas Act 1899	62 & 63 Vict. c. xl	20 June 1899
An Act to extend the limits of supply of and to confer further powers on the Cambridge University and Town Gas Light Company and for other purposes.
St. Albans Gas Act 1899	62 & 63 Vict. c. xli	20 June 1899
An Act to extend the powers of and amend the Act relating to the St. Alban's Gas Company and for other purposes.
Hull, Barnsley and West Riding Junction Railway and Dock (Various Powers) Act 1899	62 & 63 Vict. c. xlii	20 June 1899
An Act to authorise the Hull Barnsley and West Riding Junction Railway and Dock Company to abandon certain of their authorised works and to confer further powers upon that Company and for other purposes.
Arbroath Corporation Gas Act 1899	62 & 63 Vict. c. xliii	20 June 1899
An Act to authorise the Magistrates and Town Council of Arbroath to borrow additional money in connexion with their Gas Undertaking to amend and repeal certain provisions of the Arbroath Corporation Gas Act 1871 (Note: Arbroath Corporation Gas Act 1871 (34 & 35 Vict. c. xciii)) and for other purposes.
Kew Bridge Act 1898 Amendment Act 1899	62 & 63 Vict. c. xliv	20 June 1899
An Act to empower the County Councils of the Administrative Counties of Middlesex and Surrey to raise further moneys for the purposes of the Kew Bridge Act 1898. (Note: Kew Bridge Act 1898 (61 & 62 Vict. c. clv))
West Highland Railway Act 1899	62 & 63 Vict. c. xlv	20 June 1899
An Act to extend the time limited by the West Highland Railway Acts 1894 (Note: West Highland Railway Act 1894 (57 & 58 Vict. c. clvi)) and 1896 (Note: West Highland Railway Act 1896 (59 & 60 Vict. c. ccxix)) for the compulsory purchase of lands and for the completion of the railways authorised by the said Acts and for other purposes.
Crowborough District Water Act 1899 (repealed)	62 & 63 Vict. c. xlvi	20 June 1899
An Act to enable the Crowborough District Water Company to extend their limits of Supply construct Additional Waterworks and for other purposes. (Repealed by Mid-Sussex Water Order 1985 (SI 1985/513))
Dumbarton Burgh Act 1899	62 & 63 Vict. c. xlvii	20 June 1899
An Act to extend the municipal and police boundaries of the Burgh of Dumbarton for sanctioning a guarantee rate upon the owners and occupiers of lands and heritages in the burgh in further security of the interest on a portion of the debt of the Dumbarton Harbour Board and for other purposes.
North Pembrokeshire and Fishguard Railway Act 1899	62 & 63 Vict. c. xlviii	20 June 1899
An Act to provide for the abandonment of certain authorised railways of the North Pembrokeshire and Fishguard Railway Company and for the vesting of the undertaking of that Company in the Great Western Railway Company and for other purposes.
Infant Orphan Asylum Act 1899 (repealed)	62 & 63 Vict. c. xlix	20 June 1899
An Act to restore to the Presidents Vice-Presidents Treasurer and Governors of the Infant Orphan Asylum a Strip of Land in Epping Forest which has been forfeited by them and become part of the waste of the Forest. (Repealed by Statute Law (Repeals) Act 2013 (c. 2))
London Hospital Act 1899 (repealed)	62 & 63 Vict. c. l	20 June 1899
An Act to enable the Governors of the London Hospital to acquire certain Lands and to erect buildings for their Outpatients' Department and for other purposes. (Repealed by Statute Law (Repeals) Act 2013 (c. 2))
Tees Valley Waterworks Act 1899 (repealed)	62 & 63 Vict. c. li	20 June 1899
An Act to authorise the Stockton and Middlesbrough Water Board to construct a new Reservoir and other Works to amend the Acts relating to the supply of Water by the Board to change the Name of the Board and for other purposes. (Repealed by Tees Valley Water (Consolidation) Act 1907 (7 Edw. 7. c. lxxx))
Ilford Gas Act 1899	62 & 63 Vict. c. lii	20 June 1899
An Act for incorporating and conferring powers on the Ilford Gas Company.
Birkenhead Corporation Act 1899	62 & 63 Vict. c. liii	20 June 1899
An Act to confer further powers on the Corporation of the County Borough of Birkenhead in relation to Tramways and for other purposes.
London, Brighton and South Coast Railway (Pensions) Act 1899	62 & 63 Vict. c. liv	13 July 1899
An Act to provide for the establishment and regulation of a Pension Fund for officers and servants of the London Brighton and South Coast Railway Company.
Friends' Provident Institution Act 1899 (repealed)	62 & 63 Vict. c. lv	13 July 1899
An Act for enabling the Friends' Provident Institution to sue and be sued in the name of a Public Officer for more effectually vesting in their Trustees for the time being the Funds and Property of the Institution for conferring further powers on the Institution as to the Investment of their Funds and for other purposes. (Repealed by Friends' Provident Life Office Act 1975 (c. xiv))
Skipton Urban District Gas Act 1899	62 & 63 Vict. c. lvi	13 July 1899
An Act to empower the Urban District Council of the Urban District of Skipton to supply gas and to purchase the undertaking of the Skipton Gas Company and for other purposes.
Mid-Kent Gaslight and Coke Act 1899	62 & 63 Vict. c. lvii	13 July 1899
An Act for incorporating and conferring powers upon the Mid-Kent Gaslight and Coke Company.
Wishaw Water Act 1899 (repealed)	62 & 63 Vict. c. lviii	13 July 1899
An Act to confer further borrowing powers on the Commissioners of the Burgh of Wishaw for the purposes of their Water Undertaking. (Repealed by Motherwell and Wishaw Burgh Order Confirmation Act 1952 (15 & 16 Geo. 6 & 1 Eliz. 2. c. iii))
Shotley Bridge and Consett District Gas Act 1899	62 & 63 Vict. c. lix	13 July 1899
An Act to confer further powers upon the Shotley Bridge and Consett District Gas Company.
Aberdeen Corporation Act 1899 (repealed)	62 & 63 Vict. c. lx	13 July 1899
An Act to provide for the constitution of the city and royal burgh of Aberdeen as a county of a city to authorise the Lord Provost Magistrates and Town Council of the said city and royal burgh to execute Sewage Works and for other purposes. (Repealed by Aberdeen Corporation (Administration Finance, &c.) Order Confirmation Act 1940 (3 & 4 Geo. 6. c. iii))
Cardiff Railway Act 1899	62 & 63 Vict. c. lxi	13 July 1899
An Act for empowering the Cardiff Railway Company to construct new railways and to abandon the construction of portions of railways already authorised for extending the time for the purchase of lands for and for the completion of certain railways and for other purposes.
Rhondda Urban District Council Act 1899 (repealed)	62 & 63 Vict. c. lxii	13 July 1899
An Act to authorise the Rhondda Urban District Council to construct a tramroad and additional, waterworks to extend the periods limited by the Ystradyfodwg Urban District Council (Gas and Water) Act 1896 (Note: Ystradyfodwg Urban District Council (Gas and Water) Act 1896 (59 & 60 Vict. c. lxxi)) for the purchase of lands and construction of works and for other purposes. (Repealed by Rhondda Corporation Act 1973 (c. xxiii))
Hastings and St. Leonards Gas Act 1899	62 & 63 Vict. c. lxiii	13 July 1899
An Act to extend the powers of the Hastings and Saint Leonards Gas Company to amend the Acts relating to that Company and for other purposes.
Belfast and Northern Counties Railway Act 1899	62 & 63 Vict. c. lxiv	13 July 1899
An Act to empower the Belfast and Northern Counties Railway Company to widen their Carrickfergus and Lame Branch Railway to construct a pier and embankment or sea road at Whitehead to confirm the purchase by the Company of the Portstewart Tramway to confer further powers upon the Company in connection with their undertaking and for other purposes.
Colonial and Foreign Banks Guarantee Fund Incorporation Act 1899	62 & 63 Vict. c. lxv	13 July 1899
An Act to incorporate the Trustees of the Colonial and Foreign Banks Guarantee Fund and to enlarge the powers vested in such Trustees and for other purposes.
Grosvenor Chapel Act 1899	62 & 63 Vict. c. lxvi	13 July 1899
An Act for the abolition of the Perpetual Curacy of the Consecrated Chapel called "Grosvenor Chapel" in the Parish of Saint George Hanover Square in the County and Diocese of London and for vesting the said Chapel in the Rector of the said Parish and for other purposes.
Church of Emmanuel West End Hampstead Act 1899	62 & 63 Vict. c. lxvii	13 July 1899
An Act to provide for the Sale and Disposal of the Site of the Church of Emmanuel West End Hampstead.
Brynmawr and Western Valleys Railway Act 1899	62 & 63 Vict. c. lxviii	13 July 1899
An Act for incorporating the Brynmawr and Western Valleys Railway Company and authorising them to construct a Railway in the County of Monmouth and for other purposes.
Barton-on-Sea Water Act 1899	62 & 63 Vict. c. lxix	13 July 1899
An Act to incorporate and confer powers for the supply of Water upon the Barton-on-Sea Water Company.
Lanarkshire (Middle Ward District) Water Act 1899 (repealed)	62 & 63 Vict. c. lxx	13 July 1899
An Act to enable the District Committee of the Middle Ward of the county of Lanark to construct additional waterworks and certain railways in connection with their undertaking to confer further powers on the County Council of the county of Lanark with respect to the domestic water rate authorised by the Lanarkshire (Middle Ward District) Water Act 1892 (Note: Lanarkshire (Middle Ward District) Water Act 1892 (55 & 56 Vict. c. clxix)) and to enable them to borrow additional money to amend the provisions of the said Act and for other purposes. (Repealed by Lanarkshire County Council Order Confirmation Act 1939 (2 & 3 Geo. 6. c. xcii))
Edinburgh Corporation Act 1899 (repealed)	62 & 63 Vict. c. lxxi	13 July 1899
An Act to authorise the Lord Provost Magistrates and Council of the City of Edinburgh to provide erect and maintain a Municipal Hall to provide increased facilities in connection with their Electric Lighting Undertaking to construct works and Tramways to acquire lands to amend Acts and for other purposes. (Repealed by Edinburgh Corporation Order Confirmation Act 1933 (24 & 25 Geo. 5. c. v))
Wetherby District Water Act 1899	62 & 63 Vict. c. lxxii	13 July 1899
An Act for supplying with water certain Parishes in the Rural Districts of Wetherby and Tadcaster in the West Riding of the County of York.
Airdrie and Coatbridge Waterworks Amendment Act 1899	62 & 63 Vict. c. lxxiii	13 July 1899
An Act to empower the Airdrie and Coatbridge Water Company to abandon certain works authorised; by the Airdrie and Coatbridge Waterworks Amendment Act 1892 (Note: Airdrie and Coatbridge Waterworks Amendment Act 1892 (55 & 56 Vict. c. cxvii)) and to construct additional waterworks to amend the provisions of that Act to raise additional capital and for other purposes.
Gainsborough Urban District Council Gas Act 1899	62 & 63 Vict. c. lxxiv	13 July 1899
An Act to provide for the transfer of the undertaking of the Gainsborough Gas Company to the Gainsborough Urban District Council and to confer further powers on the said Council with respect to the supply of gas and for other purposes.
Wick and Pulteney Harbours Act 1899	62 & 63 Vict. c. lxxv	13 July 1899
An Act to authorise the Wick and Pulteney Harbours Trustees to construct additional works to amend the Pulteney Harbour Act 1879 (Note: Pulteney Harbour Act 1879 (42 & 43 Vict. c. cxlix)) and the Wick and Pulteney Harbours Order 1883 and to confer further powers upon the Trustees and for other purposes.
Dundee Gas, Street Improvements and Tramways Act 1899 (repealed)	62 & 63 Vict. c. lxxvi	13 July 1899
An Act to authorise the Dundee Gas Commissioners to construct further works to authorise the widening and improvement of streets and the construction of new Tramways and for other purposes. (Repealed by Dundee Corporation (Consolidated Powers) Order Confirmation Act 1957 (6 & 7 Eliz. 2. c. iv))
Cork Corporation (Finance) Act 1899	62 & 63 Vict. c. lxxvii	13 July 1899
An Act to enable the Mayor Aldermen and Burgesses of the city of Cork to raise additional money to regulate the finances of the Corporation and for other purposes.
South Eastern Railway Act 1899	62 & 63 Vict. c. lxxviii	13 July 1899
An Act for conferring further powers on the South Eastern Railway Company and for other purposes.
Fishguard Water and Gas Act 1899	62 & 63 Vict. c. lxxix	13 July 1899
An Act for supplying with Water and Gas the parishes of Fishguard Manorowen and Llanwnda in the county of Pembroke.
Bury Corporation Act 1899 (repealed)	62 & 63 Vict. c. lxxx	13 July 1899
An Act to authorise the Corporation of Bury to work the Tramways in the Borough of Bury when acquired by them and to make further and better provision in relation to the local government of the said Borough and for other purposes. (Repealed by Bury Corporation Act 1909 (9 Edw. 7. c. clix))
Bury Corporation Water Act 1899	62 & 63 Vict. c. lxxxi	13 July 1899
An Act to authorise the Corporation of Bury to construct additional waterworks and for other purposes.
Barry Railway Act 1899	62 & 63 Vict. c. lxxxii	13 July 1899
An Act to confer further powers upon the Barry Railway Company.
Kensington and Notting Hill Electric Lighting Companies Act 1899	62 & 63 Vict. c. lxxxiii	13 July 1899
An Act for conferring powers on the Kensington and Knightsbridge Electric Lighting Company Limited and the Notting Hill Electric Lighting Company Limited jointly and severally to acquire lands and to erect and work generating stations and for other purposes.
Lancashire and Yorkshire Railway (New Railways) Act 1899	62 & 63 Vict. c. lxxxiv	13 July 1899
An Act for conferring further powers on the Lancashire and Yorkshire Railway Company with respect to the construction of Railways in the County of Lancaster and for other purposes.
Lancashire and Yorkshire Railway (Various Powers) Act 1899	62 & 63 Vict. c. lxxxv	13 July 1899
An Act for conferring further powers on the Lancashire and Yorkshire Railway Company with relation to their own undertaking and upon that Company and the London and North Western Railway Company with relation to the Preston and Wyre Railway and for other purposes.
Cobham Gas Act 1899	62 & 63 Vict. c. lxxxvi	13 July 1899
An Act for supplying with Gas the Parish of Cobham in the County of Surrey and adjacent places.
Stretford Gas Act 1899	62 & 63 Vict. c. lxxxvii	13 July 1899
An Act for granting further powers to the Stretford Gas Company.
Central Electric Supply Company Act 1899	62 & 63 Vict. c. lxxxviii	13 July 1899
An Act to confer upon the Central Electric Supply Company Limited powers to construct works and supply Electrical Energy and for other purposes.
Shirebrook and District Gas Act 1899	62 & 63 Vict. c. lxxxix	13 July 1899
An Act for incorporating and conferring powers on the Shirebrook and District Gas Company.
South Staffordshire Stipendiary Justice Act 1899 (repealed)	62 & 63 Vict. c. xc	13 July 1899
An Act to make provision for the more effectual execution of the office of Justice of the Peace in South Staffordshire. (Repealed by Justices of the Peace Act 1968 (c. 69))
West Middlesex Waterworks Act 1899	62 & 63 Vict. c. xci	13 July 1899
An Act to confer further powers upon the Company of Proprietors of the West Middlesex Waterworks with respect to the construction of works the taking of water from the River Thames and the raising of capital and for other purposes.
Church Stretton Water Act 1899	62 & 63 Vict. c. xcii	13 July 1899
An Act for supplying with Water the Parish of Church Stretton in the County of Salop.
St. Neot's Water Act 1899 (repealed)	62 & 63 Vict. c. xciii	13 July 1899
An Act to enable the St. Neot's Water Company to raise additional capital and for other purposes. (Repealed by St. Neot's Urban District Council Act 1907 (7 Edw. 7. c. xxxix))
St. James' and Pall Mall Electric Light Company Act 1899	62 & 63 Vict. c. xciv	13 July 1899
An Act to empower the Saint James' and Pall Mall Electric Light Company Limited to acquire lands and erect Generating Stations and for other purposes.
Belfast Water Act 1899	62 & 63 Vict. c. xcv	13 July 1899
An Act to confer further Powers on the Belfast City and District Water Commissioners.
Great Central Railway Act 1899	62 & 63 Vict. c. xcvi	13 July 1899
An Act to enable the Great Central Railway Company to make New Works to acquire additional lands to stop up certain roads or footpaths to extend the time for the compulsory purchase of certain lands for the completion of certain Railways and for the sale of superfluous lands by the Cheshire Lines Committee and the Sheffield and Midland Railway Companies Committee to raise additional capital and for other purposes.
Scunthorpe Urban District Gas and Water Act 1899	62 & 63 Vict. c. xcvii	13 July 1899
An Act to authorise the Scunthorpe Urban District Council in the County of Lincoln to construct and maintain Gasworks and Waterworks and for other purposes.
London, Chatham and Dover Railway Act 1899	62 & 63 Vict. c. xcviii	13 July 1899
An Act to enable the London Chatham and Dover Railway Company to raise further capital and for other purposes.
Ionian Bank (Limited) Act 1899	62 & 63 Vict. c. xcix	13 July 1899
An Act to make further provision with respect to the transmission of shares of the Ionian Bank Limited held by shareholders being subjects of the Kingdom of Greece.
Inverness Harbour Act 1899	62 & 63 Vict. c. c	13 July 1899
An Act to authorise the Trustees of the Harbour of Inverness to construct new Quays and other works and to confer further powers upon the Trustees and upon the Town Council of the Royal Burgh of Inverness and for other purposes.
Nottingham Corporation Act 1899	62 & 63 Vict. c. ci	13 July 1899
An Act to empower the Corporation of Nottingham to construct additional tramways to make new waterworks and a street improvement and for other purposes.
Taff Vale Railway Act 1899	62 & 63 Vict. c. cii	13 July 1899
An Act to enlarge the powers of the Taff Vale Railway Company with reference to the construction of works and the acquisition of lands and for other purposes.
Transvaal Mortgage Loan and Finance Company Act 1899	62 & 63 Vict. c. ciii	13 July 1899
An Act for enabling the Transvaal Mortgage Loan and Finance Company Limited to arrange with the holders of their Founders' Shares for subdividing Shares and creating certain preferences and for other purposes.
Great Yarmouth New Britannia Pier Act 1899	62 & 63 Vict. c. civ	13 July 1899
An Act to incorporate a Company for the purpose of acquiring the existing Great Yarmouth Britannia Pier and of constructing a new and improved Pier in lieu thereof and for other purposes.
Lisburn Urban District Council Act 1899	62 & 63 Vict. c. cv	13 July 1899
An Act to extend the borrowing powers of the Urban District Council of the Urban District of Lisburn to enable them to consolidate their debts to create and issue new stock to confer further powers upon them for the better management of the District and for other purposes.
Aire and Calder Navigation Act 1899	62 & 63 Vict. c. cvi	13 July 1899
An Act to make further provisions with reference to and to confer further powers on the Undertakers of the Navigation of the Rivers of Aire and Calder in the West Riding of the County of York to amend the Acts relating to their undertaking and for other purposes.
Midland Railway Act 1899	62 & 63 Vict. c. cvii	13 July 1899
An Act to confer additional powers upon the Midland Railway Company and upon that Company and the Lancashire and Yorkshire Railway Company and upon the Midland and North Eastern Railway Companies Committee and upon the Norfolk and Suffolk Joint Railways Committee and upon the Midland and Great Northern Railways Joint Committee for the construction of works and the acquisition of lands to authorise agreements between the Midland Lancashire and Yorkshire and Great Northern Railway Companies to confirm an agreement between the Midland and Midland and South Western Junction Railway Companies to provide for the vesting of the undertaking of the Barnoldswick Railway Company in the Midland Railway Company and for other purposes.
Local Government Board's Provisional Orders Confirmation (No. 2) Act 1899	62 & 63 Vict. c. cviii	13 July 1899
An Act to confirm certain Provisional Orders of the Local Government Board relating to Brentford Bromley (Kent) Chelmsford Heston and Isle Worth Ongar (Rural) Reigate (Rural) and Watford (Rural).
	Brentford Order 1899 Provisional Order to enable the Urban District Council of Brentford to put in force the Compulsory Clauses of the Lands Clauses Acts.	
	Bromley (Kent) Order 1899 Provisional Order to enable the Urban District Council of Bromley to put in force the Compulsory Clauses of the Lands Clauses Acts.	
	Chelmsford Order 1899 Provisional Order to enable the Urban District Council for the Borough of Chelmsford to put in force the Compulsory Clauses of the Lands Clauses Acts.	
	Heston and Isleworth Order 1899 Provisional Order to enable the Urban District Council of Heston and Isleworth to put in force the Compulsory Clauses of the Lands Clauses Acts.	
	Ongar Rural Order 1899 Provisional Order to enable the Rural District Council of Ongar to put in force the Compulsory Clauses of the Lands Clauses Acts.	
	Reigate Rural Order 1899 Provisional Order to enable the Rural District Council of Reigate to put in force the Compulsory Clauses of the Lands Clauses Acts.	
	Watford Rural Order 1899 Provisional Order to enable the Rural District Council of Watford to put in force the Compulsory Clauses of the Lands Clauses Acts.	
Local Government Board's Provisional Orders Confirmation (No. 3) Act 1899	62 & 63 Vict. c. cix	13 July 1899
An Act to confirm certain Provisional Orders of the Local Government Board relating to Durham (Rural) Eastbourne Honiton (Rural) Grimsby Ilfracombe Lichfield (Rural) Ludlow and Rotherham (Rural).
	Durham Rural Order 1899 Provisional Order to enable the Rural District Council of Durham to put in force the Compulsory Clauses of the Lands Clauses Acts.	
	Eastbourne Order 1899 Provisional Order to enable the Urban District Council for the Borough of Eastbourne to put in force the Compulsory Clauses of the Lands Clauses Acts.	
	Honiton Rural Order 1899 Provisional Order to enable the Rural District Council of Honiton to put in force the Compulsory Clauses of the Lands Clauses Acts.	
	Grimsby Order 1899 Provisional Order to enable the Urban Sanitary Authority for the Borough of Grimsby to put in force the Compulsory Clauses of the Lands Clauses Acts.	
	Ilfracombe Order 1899 Provisional Order to enable the Urban District Council of Ilfracombe to put in force the Compulsory Clauses of the Lands Clauses Acts.	
	Lichfield Rural Order 1899 Provisional Order to enable the Rural District Council of Lichfield to put in force the Compulsory Clauses of the Lands Clauses Acts.	
	Ludlow Order 1899 Provisional Order to enable the Urban District Council for the Borough of Ludlow to put in force the Compulsory Clauses of the Lands Clauses Acts.	
	Rotherham Rural Order 1899 Provisional Order to enable the Rural District Council of Rotherham to put in force the Compulsory Clauses of the Lands Clauses Acts.	
Local Government Board's Provisional Orders Confirmation (No. 5) Act 1899	62 & 63 Vict. c. cx	13 July 1899
An Act to confirm certain Provisional Orders of the Local Government Board relating to Ashton-in-Makerfield Ashton-under-Lyne Bolton Llandudno Rotherham Southport (two) and York.
	Ashton in Makerfield Order 1899 Provisional Order for partially repealing and altering a Local Act (Note: Ashton-in-Makerfield Local Board Act 1875 (38 & 39 Vict. c. xxxviii)) and certain Confirming Acts.	
	Ashton-under-Lyne Order 1899 Provisional Order for altering certain Local Acts and Confirming Acts.	
	Bolton Order 1899 Provisional Order for altering a Local Act (Note: Bolton Improvement Act 1882 (45 & 46 Vict. c. ccxliv)) and a Confirming Act. (Note: Local Government Board's Provisional Orders Confirmation (No. 5) Act 1890 (53 & 54 Vict. c. lxxxiv))	
	Llandudno Order 1899 Provisional Order for altering a Local Act (Note: Llandudno Improvement Act 1854 (17 & 18 Vict. c. cii)) and a Confirming Act. (Note: Local Government Board's Provisional Orders Confirmation (Acton, &c.) Act 1881 (44 & 45 Vict. c. clxii))	
	Rotherham Order 1899 Provisional Order for altering the Rotherham Corporation Act 1896. (Note: Rotherham Corporation Act 1896 (59 & 60 Vict. c. xxvi))	
	Southport Order (No. 1) 1899 Provisional Order for altering a Confirming Act. (Note: Local Government Board's Provisional Orders Confirmation (No. 6) Act 1895 (58 & 59 Vict. c. lxxxvii))	
	Southport Order (No. 2) 1899 Provisional Order for altering the Southport Improvement Act 1885. (Note: Southport Improvement Act 1885 (48 & 49 Vict. c. cxxii))	
	York Order 1899 Provisional Order for altering the York Extension and Improvement Act 1884. (Note: York Extension and Improvement Act 1884 (47 & 48 Vict. c. ccxxxii))	
Local Government Board's Provisional Orders Confirmation (No. 7) Act 1899	62 & 63 Vict. c. cxi	13 July 1899
An Act to confirm certain Provisional Orders of the Local Government Board relating to the boroughs of Barnstaple and Halifax and to the counties of East Sussex and Middlesex.
	Barnstaple (Extension) Order 1899 Provisional Order made in pursuance of Sections 54 and 59 of the Local Government Act 1888. (Note: Local Government Act 1888 (51 & 52 Vict. c. 41))	
	Borough of Halifax Order 1899 Provisional Order made in pursuance of Sections 54 and 59 of the Local Government Act 1888.	
	County of East Sussex Order 1899 Provisional Order made in pursuance of sub-section (2) of Section 69 of the Local Government Act 1888.	
	County of Middlesex Order 1899 Provisional Order made in pursuance of sub-section (2) of Section 69 of the Local Government Act 1888.	
Local Government Board's Provisional Orders Confirmation (No. 8) Act 1899	62 & 63 Vict. c. cxii	13 July 1899
An Act to confirm certain Provisional Orders of the Local Government Board relating to Bath (three) Devonport (two) Margate and Oxford and to the Romford land Wallingford and Crowmarsh United Districts.
	Bath Order (No. 1) 1899 Provisional Order to enable the Urban Sanitary Authority for the City of Bath to put in force the Compulsory Clauses of the Lands Clauses Acts.	
	Bath Order (No. 2) 1899 Provisional Order to enable the Urban Sanitary Authority for the City of Bath to put in force the Compulsory Clauses of the Lands Clauses Acts.	
	Bath Order (No. 3) 1899 Provisional Order for altering certain Local Acts (Note: Bath Water Supply Act 1846 (9 & 10 Vict. c. ccxx)) (Note: Bath Act 1870 (33 & 34 Vict. c. liii)) (Note: Bath Act 1879 (42 & 43 Vict. c. lxii)) and a Confirming Act. (Note: Local Government Board's Provisional Orders Confirmation (No. 6) Act 1887 (50 & 51 Vict. c. cxi)) (Note: Local Government Board's Provisional Orders Confirmation (No. 12) Act 1892 (55 & 56 Vict. c. ccxxiii))	
	Devonport Order (No. 1) 1899 Provisional Order to enable the Urban Sanitary Authority for the Borough of Devonport to put in force the Compulsory Clauses of the Lands Clauses Acts.	
	Devonport Order (No. 2) 1899 Provisional Order to enable the Urban Sanitary Authority for the Borough of Devonport to put in force the Compulsory Clauses of the Lands Clauses Acts.	
	Margate Order 1899 Provisional Order for altering a Local Act. (Note: Margate Extension and Improvement Act 1877 (40 & 41 Vict. c. ccvii))	
	Oxford Order 1899 Provisional Order for altering a Confirming Act. (Note: Local Government Board's Provisional Orders Confirmation Act 1874 (No. 5) (37 & 38 Vict. c. clxxxii))	
	Romford Joint Hospital Order 1899 Provisional Order for forming a United District under Section 279 of the Public Health Act 1875. (Note: Public Health Act 1875 (38 & 39 Vict. c. 55))	
	Wallingford and Crowmarsh Hospital Order 1899 Provisional Order for forming a United District under Section 279 of the Public Health Act 1875.	
Local Government Board's Provisional Orders Confirmation (No. 11) Act 1899	62 & 63 Vict. c. cxiii	13 July 1899
An Act to confirm certain Provisional Orders of the Local Government Board relating to Croydon (Rural) Jarrow Ramsgate (two) Ripon and West Bromwich (two).
	Croydon Rural (Purley) Order 1899 Provisional Order for dissolving the Special Drainage District of Purley.	
	Jarrow Order 1899 Provisional Order for the alteration of certain Local Acts.	
	Ramsgate Order (No. 1) 1899 Provisional Order to enable the Urban District Council for the Borough of Ramsgate to put in force the Compulsory Clauses of the Lands Clauses Acts.	
	Ramsgate Order (No. 2) 1899 Provisional Order for altering a Local Act (Note: Ramsgate Local Board Act 1877 (40 & 41 Vict. c. cxix)) and certain Confirming Acts.	
	Ripon Order 1899 Provisional Order for altering the Ripon Corporation Act 1886. (Note: Ripon Corporation Act 1886 (49 & 50 Vict. c. lxvii))	
	West Bromwich Order (No. 1) 1899 Provisional Order for partially repealing and altering the West Bromwich Corporation (Consolidation of Loans) Act 1889. (Note: West Bromwich Corporation (Consolidation of Loans) Act 1889 (52 & 53 Vict. c. xcvi))	
	West Bromwich Order (No. 2) 1899 Provisional Order for altering the West Bromwich Improvement Act 1854. (Note: West Bromwich Improvement Act 1854 (17 & 18 Vict. c. clxiii))	
Local Government Board's Provisional Orders Confirmation (Gas) Act 1899	62 & 63 Vict. c. cxiv	13 July 1899
An Act to confirm certain Provisional Orders of the Local Government Board relating to Ashburton Wallingford and Wokingham.
	Ashburton Gas Order 1899 Provisional Order under the Gas and Water Works Facilities Act 1870. (Note: Gas and Water Works Facilities Act 1870 (33 & 34 Vict. c. 70))	
	Wallingford Gas Order 1899 Provisional Order under the Gas and Water Works Facilities Act 1870.	
	Wokingham Gas Order 1899 Provisional Order under the Gas and Water Works Facilities Act 1870 and the Gas and Water Works Facilities Act 1870 Amendment Act 1873. (Note: Gas and Water Works Facilities Act 1870 Amendment Act 1873 (36 & 37 Vict. c. 89))	
Local Government Board's Provisional Order Confirmation (Housing of Working Classes) Act 1899	62 & 63 Vict. c. cxv	13 July 1899
An Act to confirm a Provisional Order of the Local Government Board relating to Brighton.
	Brighton (Housing of Working Classes) Order 1899 Provisional Order for confirming an Improvement Scheme under Part I. of the Housing of the Working Classes Act 1890. (Note: Housing of the Working Classes Act 1890 (53 & 54 Vict. c. 70))	
Local Government Board's Provisional Orders Confirmation (Poor Law) Act 1899	62 & 63 Vict. c. cxvi	13 July 1899
An Act to confirm certain Provisional Orders of the Local Government Board relating to the Parishes of Devonport and Saint Mary Newington and to the Greenwich and Wolverhampton Unions.
	Devonport Order 1899 Provisional Order for partially repealing a Local Act (Note: Plymouth and Stoke Damarel Poor Relief and Improvement Act 1814 (54 Geo. 3. c. clxxii)) and a Confirming Act. (Note: Local Government Board's Provisional Order Confirmation (No. 10) Act 1898 (61 & 62 Vict. c. ccxi))	
	Saint Mary Newington Order 1899 Provisional Order for partially repealing and altering a Local Act. (Note: St. Mary, Newington, Poor Relief and Workhouse Act 1814 (54 Geo. 3. c. cxiii))	
	Greenwich Union Order 1899 Provisional Order made in pursuance of sub-section (3) of Scction 2 of the Poor Law Act 1889. (Note: Poor Law Act 1889 (52 & 53 Vict. c. 56))	
	Wolverhampton Union Order 1899 Provisional Order made in pursuance of sub-section (3) of Section 2 of the Poor Law Act 1889.	
Borrowstounness Improvement Order Confirmation Act 1899	62 & 63 Vict. c. cxvii	13 July 1899
An Act to confirm a Provisional Order by the Secretary for Scotland relating to the Burgh of Borrowstounness.
	Borrowstounness Order 1899 Provisional Order for confirming an Improvement Scheme under Part I. of the Housing of the Working Classes Act 1890 relating to the Burgh of Borrowstounness.	
Electric Lighting Order Confirmation (No. 3) Act 1899	62 & 63 Vict. c. cxviii	13 July 1899
An Act to confirm a Provisional Order made by the Board of Trade under the Electric Lighting Acts 1882 and 1888 relating to Bermondsey.
	Bermondsey Electric Lighting Order 1899 Provisional Order granted by the Board of Trade under the Electric Lighting Acts 1882 and 1888 to the Vestry of the Parish of Bermondsey in the County of London in respect of the Parish of Bermondsey.	
Electric Lighting Orders Confirmation (No. 5) Act 1899 (repealed)	62 & 63 Vict. c. cxix	13 July 1899
An Act to confirm certain Provisional Orders made by the Board of Trade under the Electric Lighting Acts 1882 and 1888 and the Electric Lighting (Scotland) Act 1890 (Note: Electric Lighting (Scotland) Act 1890 (53 & 54 Vict. c. 13)) relating to Alloa Dumfries Inverness and Kilmarnock. (Repealed by North of Scotland Electricity Order Confirmation Act 1958 (7 & 8 Eliz. 2. c. ii))
	Alloa Electric Lighting Order 1899 Provisional Order granted by the Board of Trade under the Electric Lighting Acts 1882 and 1888 and the Electric Lighting (Scotland) Act 1890 to the Commissioners of the Burgh of Alloa in the County of Clackmannan in respect of the Burgh of Alloa.	
	Dumfries Electric Supply Order 1899 Provisional Order granted by the Board of Trade under the Electric Lighting Acts 1882 and 1888 and the Electric Lighting (Scotland) Act 1890 to the Provost Magistrates and Town Council of the Royal Burgh of Dumfries in the County of Dumfries in respect of the Royal Burgh of Dumfries.	
	Inverness Electric Lighting Order 1899 Provisional Order granted by the Board of Trade under the Electric Lighting Acts 1882 and 1888 and the Electric Lighting (Scotland) Act 1890 to the Provost Magistrates and Toon Council of the Royal Burgh of Inverness in the County of Inverness in respect of the Royal Burgh of Inverness.	
	Kilmarnock Electric Lighting Order 1899 Provisional Order granted by the Board of Trade under the Electric Lighting Acts 1882 and 1888 and the Electric Lighting (Scotland) Act 1890 to the Provost Magistrates and Town Council of the Burgh of Kilmarnock in respect of the Burgh of Kilmarnock in the County of Ayr.	
Electric Lighting Orders Confirmation (No. 6) Act 1899	62 & 63 Vict. c. cxx	13 July 1899
An Act to confirm certain Provisional Orders made by the Board of Trade under the Electric Lighting Acts 1882 and 1888 relating to Ashford (Kent) Bognor Burslem (Extension) Cheltenham (Extension) Durham Haslingden and Ilkeston.
	Ashford (Kent) Electric Lighting Order 1899 Provisional Order granted by the Board of Trade under the Electric Lighting Acts 1882 and 1888 to the Urban District Council of Ashford in the County of Kent in respect of the Urban District of Ashford.	
	Bognor Electric Lighting Order 1899 Provisional Order granted by the Board of Trade under the Electric Lighting Acts 1882 and 1888 to the Urban District Council of Bognor in the County of Sussex in respect of the Urban District of Bognor.	
	Burslem Electric Lighting (Extension) Order 1899 Provisional Order granted by the Board of Trade under the Electric Lighting Acts 1882 and 1888 to the Mayor Aldermen and Burgesses of the Borough of Burslem in respect of the Parish of Wolstanton in the County of Stafford.	
	Cheltenham (Extension) Electric Lighting Order 1899 Provisional Order granted by the Board of Trade under the Electric Lighting Acts 1882 and 1888 to the Mayor Aldermen and Burgesses of the Borough of Cheltenham in the County of Gloucester extending the area of supply to the whole of the Borough of Cheltenham and to amend the Cheltenham Electric Lighting Order 1890.	
	Durham Corporation Electric Lighting Order 1899 Provisional Order granted by the Board of Trade under the Electric Lighting Acts 1882 and 1888 to the Mayor Aldermen and Citizens of the City of Durham in respect of the City of Durham in the County of Durham.	
	Haslingden Electric Lighting Order 1899 Provisional Order granted by the Board of Trade under the Electric Lighting Acts 1882 and 1888 to the Mayor Aldermen and Burgesses of the Borough of Haslingden in the County of Lancaster in respect of the Borough of Haslingden.	
	Ilkeston Electric Supply Order 1899 Provisional Order granted by the Board of Trade under the Electric Lighting Acts 1882 and 1888 to the Mayor Aldermen and Burgesses of the Borough of Ilkeston in the County of Derby in respect of the said Borough.	
Electric Lighting Orders Confirmation (No. 7) Act 1899	62 & 63 Vict. c. cxxi	13 July 1899
An Act to confirm certain Provisional Orders made by the Board of Trade under the Electric Lighting Acts 1882 and 1888 relating to Gorton Heaton Norris Keighley Knutsford Ryde and Walker.
	Gorton Electric Supply Order 1899 Provisional Order granted by the Board of Trade under the Electric Lighting Acts 1882 and 1888 to the Gorton Urban District Council in respect of the Urban District of Gorton in the County Palatine of Lancaster.	
	Heaton Norris Electric Lighting Order 1899 Provisional Order granted by the Board of Trade under the Electric Lighting Acts 1882 and 1888 to the Urban District Council of Heaton Norris in the County of Lancaster in respect of the Urban District of Heaton Norris.	
	Stockport (Extension) Order 1899 Provisional Order granted by the Board of Trade under the Electric Lighting Acts 1882 and 1888 to the Urban District Council of Heaton Norris in the County of Lancaster in respect of the Urban District of Heaton Norris.	
	Keighley Electric Supply Order 1899 Provisional Order granted by the Board of Trade under the Electric Lighting Acts 1882 and 1888 to the Mayor Aldermen and Burgesses of the borough of Keighley in the West Riding of the County of York in respect of the said borough.	
	Knutsford Electric Supply Order 1899 Provisional Order granted by the Board of Trade under the Electric Lighting Acts 1882 and 1888 to the Urban District Council of Knutsford in respect of the Urban District of Knutsford in the County of Chester.	
	Ryde Electric Lighting Order 1899 Provisional Order granted by the Board of Trade under the Electric Lighting Acts 1882 and 1888 to the Mayor Aldermen and Burgesses of the Borough of Ryde acting by their Council as the Urban Sanitary Authority in respect of the District of the Borough of Ryde in the Administrative County of the Isle of Wight.	
	Walker Electric Lighting Order 1899 Provisional Order granted by the Board of Trade under the Electric Lighting Acts 1882 and 1888 to the Urban District Council of Walker in respect of the Urban District of Walker in the County of Northumberland.	
Electric Lighting Orders Confirmation (No. 8) Act 1899	62 & 63 Vict. c. cxxii	13 July 1899
An Act to confirm certain Provisional Orders made by the Board of Trade under the Electric Lighting Acts 1882 and 1888 relating to Cheriton Cromer Erith Farnborough Horsham and Teignmouth.
	Cheriton Urban District Electric Lighting Order 1899 Provisional Order granted by the Board of Trade under the Electric Lighting Acts 1882 and 1888 to the Cheriton Urban District Council in respect of the Urban District of Cheriton in the County of Kent.	
	Cromer Electric Supply Order 1899 Provisional Order granted by the Board of Trade under the Electric Lighting Acts 1882 and 1888 to the Urban District Council of Cromer in respect of the Urban District of Cromer in the County of Norfolk.	
	Erith Electric Lighting Order 1899 Provisional Order granted by the Board of Trade under the Electric Lighting Acts 1882 and 1888 to the Urban District Council of Erith in respect of the Urban District of Erith in the County of Kent.	
	Farnborough Electric Lighting Order 1899 Provisional Order granted by the Board of Trade under the Electric Lighting Acts 1882 and 1888 to the Urban District Council of Farnborough in respect of the Urban District of Farnborough in the County of Southampton.	
	Horsham Electric Lighting Order 1899 Provisional Order granted by the Board of Trade under the Electric Lighting Acts 1882 and 1888 to the Horsham Urban District Council in respect of the Urban District of Horsham in the County of Sussex.	
	Teignmouth Electric Lighting Order 1899 Provisional Order granted by the Board of Trade under the Electric Lighting Acts 1882 and 1888 to the Teignmouth Urban District Council in the County of Devon.	
Electric Lighting Order Confirmation (No. 9) Act 1899	62 & 63 Vict. c. cxxiii	13 July 1899
An Act to confirm a Provisional Order made by the Board of Trade under the Electric Lighting Acts 1882 and 1888 relating to Clontarf.
	Clontarf Electric Lighting Order 1899	
Electric Lighting Orders Confirmation (No. 16) Act 1899	62 & 63 Vict. c. cxxiv	13 July 1899
An Act to confirm certain Provisional Orders made by the Board of Trade under the Electric Lighting Acts 1882 and 1888 relating to Broadstairs Christchurch and District Guildford (Extension) Newport (Isle of Wight) Sandown and Shanklin and Westgate and Birchington.
	Broadstairs Electric Lighting Order 1899	
	Christchurch and District Electric Lighting Order 1899	
	Guildford (Extension) Electric Lighting Order 1899	
	Newport (Isle of Wight) Electric Lighting Order 1899	
	Sandown and Shanklin Electric Lighting Order 1899	
	Westgate and Birchington Electric Lighting Order 1899	
Electric Lighting Orders Confirmation (No. 18) Act 1899	62 & 63 Vict. c. cxxv	13 July 1899
An Act to confirm a Provisional Order made by the Board of Trade under the Electric Lighting Acts 1882 and 1888 relating to Leamington Spa.
	Royal Leamington Spa Electric Lighting Order 1899 Provisional Order granted by the Board of Trade under the Electric Lighting Acts 1882 and 1888 to the Mayor Aldermen and Burgesses of the Borough of Royal Leamington Spa in respect of the said Borough.	
Electric Lighting Orders Confirmation (No. 19) Act 1899	62 & 63 Vict. c. cxxvi	13 July 1899
An Act to confirm certain Provisional Orders made by the Board of Trade under the Electric Lighting Acts 1882 and 1888 relating to Bournemouth (Public Purposes) Eastbourne Hendon and to the extension of the area of supply of the Midland Electric Corporation for Power Distribution (Limited).
	Bournemouth (Public Purposes) Electric Lighting Order 1899 Provisional Order granted by the Board of Trade under the Electric Lighting Acts 1882 and 1888 to the Corporation of Bournemouth in respect of the Borough of Bournemouth.	
	Eastbourne Electric Supply Order 1899 Provisional Order granted by the Board of Trade under the Electric Lighting Acts 1882 and 1888 to the Mayor Aldermen and Burgesses of the borough of Eastbourne in the County of Sussex in respect of the said Borough.	
	Hendon Electric Lighting Order 1899 Provisional Order granted by the Board of Trade under the Electric Lighting Acts 1882 and 1888 to the Electrical and General Engineering Company in respect of the Urban District of Hendon in the County of Middlesex.	
	Midland Electric Power Distribution and Lighting (Extension) Order 1899 Provisional Order under the Electric Lighting Acts 1882 and 1888 to the Midland Electric Corporation for Power Distribution (Limited) in respect of an Extension of their existing Area of Supply in the County of Stafford.	
Education Department Provisional Order Confirmation (Liverpool) Act 1899 (repealed)	62 & 63 Vict. c. cxxvii	13 July 1899
An Act to confirm a Provisional Order made by the Education Department under the Elementary Education Acts 1870 to 1893 to enable the School Board for Liverpool to put in force the Lands Clauses Acts. (Repealed by Liverpool Corporation Act 1921 (11 & 12 Geo. 5. c. lxxiv))
	Provisional Order for putting in force the Lands Clauses Acts.	
Pier and Harbour Orders Confirmation (No. 1) Act 1899	62 & 63 Vict. c. cxxviii	13 July 1899
An Act to confirm certain Provisional Orders made by the Board of Trade under the General Pier and Harbour Act 1861 (Note: General Pier and Harbour Act 1861 (24 & 25 Vict. c. 45)) relating to Blackpool Lynmouth and Otter Ferry.
	Blackpool Pier Order 1899 Provisional Order for authorising an Extension of the Blackpool Pier and other Works at Blackpool in the County of Lancaster and other purposes connected therewith.	
	Lynmouth Pier Order 1899 Provisional Order for the construction maintenance and regulation of a Promenade Pier with approaches at Lynmouth in the County of Devon.	
	Otter Ferry Pier Order 1899 Provisional Order for the Construction Maintenance and Regulation of a Pier and Works at Otter Ferry in the Parish of Kilfinan and County of Argyll.	
Local Government Board (Ireland) Provisional Order Confirmation (No. 1) Act 1899	62 & 63 Vict. c. cxxix	13 July 1899
An Act to confirm a Provisional Order of the Local Government Board for Ireland relating to Wicklow Harbour.
	Wicklow Harbour (Election) Provisional Order 1899 Provisional Order.	
Local Government Board (Ireland) Provisional Orders Confirmation (No. 2) Act 1899	62 & 63 Vict. c. cxxx	13 July 1899
An Act to confirm certain Provisional Orders of the Local Government Board for Ireland relating to Dublin Belfast Larne and Longford (Rural).
	Dublin (Fire Brigade Stations) Provisional Order 1899 Fire Brigade Stations. Provisional Order.	
	Belfast Order 1899 Provisional Order.	
	Larne (Burial Ground) Provisional Order 1899 Larne Burial Ground. Provisional Order.	
	Ardagh Burial Ground Provisional Order 1899 Ardagh Burial Ground. Provisional Order.	
Local Government Board (Ireland) Provisional Orders Confirmation (No. 3) Act 1899	62 & 63 Vict. c. cxxxi	13 July 1899
An Act to confirm certain Provisional Orders of the Local Government Board for Ireland relating to Drogheda Londonderry (Rural) and Tobercurry (Rural).
	Drogheda Waterworks Provisional Order 1899 Drogheda Waterworks. Provisional Order.	
	Claudy (Londonderry) Burial Ground Provisional Order 1899 Claudy Burial Ground. Provisional Order.	
	Rue Burial Ground Provisional Order 1899 Tobercurry Rural District–Rue Burial Ground. Provisional Order.	
Local Government Board (Ireland) Provisional Orders Confirmation (Housing of Working Classes) (No. 2) Act 1899	62 & 63 Vict. c. cxxxii	13 July 1899
An Act to confirm certain Provisional Orders of the Local Government Board for Ireland relating to Waterford and Thurles.
	Waterford Provisional Order 1899 Provisional Order giving compulsory powers of purchasing lands and premises for the purpose of Part III. of the Housing of the Working Classes Act 1890 and for Sewerage Works.	
	Thurles Provisional Order 1899 Provisional Order giving compulsory powers of purchasing lands and premises for the purposes of Part III. of the Housing of the Working Classes Act 1890.	
Military Lands Provisional Order Confirmation Act 1899 (repealed)	62 & 63 Vict. c. cxxxiii	13 July 1899
An Act to confirm a Provisional Order of the Secretary of State under the Military Lands Act 1892. (Note: Military Lands Act 1892 (55 & 56 Vict. c. 43)) (Repealed by Statute Law (Repeals) Act 2008 (c. 12))
	Great Yarmouth Military Lands Order 1899 A Provisional Order made in pursuance of Section Two of the Military Lands Act 1892 authorising the purchase by the Council of the Borough of Great Yarmouth of land for Military purposes.	
Local Government Board (Ireland) Provisional Order Confirmation (No. 4) Act 1899	62 & 63 Vict. c. cxxxiv	1 August 1899
An Act to confirm a Provisional Order of the Local Government Board for Ireland relating to the Dean's Grange Joint Burial Board District.
	Dean's Grange Joint Burial Board Provisional Order 1899 Dean's Grange Joint Burial Board. Provisional Order.	
Electric Lighting Orders Confirmation (No. 10) Act 1899	62 & 63 Vict. c. cxxxv	1 August 1899
An Act to confirm certain Provisional Orders made by the Board of Trade under the Electric Lighting Acts 1882 and 1888 relating to Camborne Dukinfield Fenton Finchley Shipley and Swinton.
	Camborne Electric Lighting Order 1899 Provisional Order granted by the Board of Trade under the Electric Lighting Acts 1882 and 1888 to the Camborne Electricity Supply Company Limited in respect of the Urban District of Camborne in the County of Cornwall.	
	Dukinfield Electric Lighting Order 1899 Provisional Order granted by the Board of Trade under the Electric Lighting Acts 1882 and 1888 to the Urban District Council of Dukinfield in respect of the Urban District of Dukinfield in the County of Chester.	
	Fenton Electric Lighting Order 1899 Provisional Order granted by the Board of Trade under the Electric Lighting Acts 1882 and 1888 to the Urban District Council of Fenton in respect of the Urban District of Fenton in the County of Stafford.	
	Finchley Electric Lighting Order 1899 Provisional Order granted by the Board of Trade under the Electric Lighting Acts 1882 and 1888 to the Finchley Urban District Council in respect of the Urban District of Finchley in the County of Middlesex.	
	Shipley Electric Lighting Order 1899 Provisional Order granted by the Board of Trade under the Electric Lighting Acts 1882 and 1888 to the Urban District Council of Shipley in respect of the Urban District of Shipley in the West Riding of the County of York.	
	Swinton Electric Lighting Order 1899 Provisional Order granted by the Board of Trade under the Electric Lighting Acts 1882 and 1888 to the Urban District Council of Swinton in respect of the Urban District of Swinton in the West Riding of the County of York.	
Electric Lighting Orders Confirmation (No. 11) Act 1899	62 & 63 Vict. c. cxxxvi	1 August 1899
An Act to confirm certain Provisional Orders made by the Board of Trade under the Electric Lighting Acts 1882 and 1888 relating to East Retford Failsworth Pemberton Stourbridge Swinton and Pendlebury and Wednesbury.
	East Retford Electric Supply Order 1899 Provisional Order granted by the Board of Trade under the Electric Lighting Acts 1882 and 1888 to the Mayor Aldermen and Burgesses of the Borough of East Retford in the County of Nottingham in respect of the said Borough.	
	Failsworth Electric Supply Order 1899 Provisional Order granted by the Board of Trade under the Electric Lighting Acts 1882 and 1888 to the Failsworth Urban District Council in respect of the Urban District of Failsworth in the County Palatine of Lancaster.	
	Pemberton Electric Supply Order 1899 Provisional Order granted by the Board of Trade under the Electric Lighting Acts 1882 and 1888 to the Urban District Council of Pemberton in respect of the Urban District of Pemberton in the County Palatine of Lancaster.	
	Stourbridge Electric Lighting Order 1899 Provisional Order granted by the Board of Trade under the Electric Lighting Acts 1882 and 1888 to the Urban District Council of Stourbridge in the County of Worcester in respect of the said Urban District.	
	Swinton and Pendlebury Electric Lighting Order 1899 Provisional Order granted by the Board of Trade under the Electric Lighting Acts 1882 and 1888 to the Urban District Council of Swinton and Pendlebury in respect of the Urban District of Swinton and Pendlebury in the County Lancaster.	
	Wednesbury Electric Supply Order 1899 Provisional Order granted by the Board of Trade under the Electric Lighting Acts 1882 and 1888 to the Mayor Aldermen and Burgesses of the Borough of Wednesbury in the county of Stafford in respect of the said borough.	
Electric Lighting Orders Confirmation (No. 12) Act 1899	62 & 63 Vict. c. cxxxvii	1 August 1899
An Act to confirm certain Provisional Orders made by the Board of Trade under the Electric Lighting Acts 1882 and 1888 relating to Hey wood Longton Ludlow Mirfield Newcastle-under-Lyme and Rawtenstall.
	Heywood Electric Supply Order 1899 Provisional Order granted by the Board of Trade under the Electric Lighting Acts 1882 and 1888 to the Mayor Aldermen and Burgesses of the Borough of Heywood in the County Palatine of Lancaster in respect of the said Borough.	
	Longton Electric Supply Order 1899 Provisional Order granted by the Board of Trade under the Electric Lighting Acts 1882 and 1888 to the Mayor Aldermen and Burgesses of the Borough of Longton in the County of Stafford in respect of the said Borough.	
	Ludlow Electric Supply Order 1899 Provisional Order granted by the Board of Trade under the Electric Lighting Acts 1882 and 1888 to the Mayor Aldermen and Burgesses of the Borough of Ludlow in the County of Salop in respect of the said Borough.	
	Mirfield Electric Lighting Order 1899 Provisional Order granted by the Board of Trade under the Electric Lighting Acts 1882 and 1888 to the Urban District Council of Mirfield in the West Riding of the County of York in respect of the Urban District of Mirfield.	
	Newcastle-under-Lyme Electric Supply Order 1899 Provisional Order granted by the Board of Trade under the Electric Lighting Acts 1882 and 1888 to the Mayor Aldermen and Burgesses of the Borough of Newcastle-under-Lyme in the County of Stafford in respect of the said Borough.	
	Rawtenstall Electric Lighting Order 1899 Provisional Order granted by the Board of Trade under the Electric Lighting Acts 1882 and 1888 to the Mayor Aldermen and Burgesses of the Borough of Rawtenstall in the County of Lancaster in respect of the Borough of Rawtenstall.	
Electric Lighting Orders Confirmation (No. 13) Act 1899 (repealed)	62 & 63 Vict. c. cxxxviii	1 August 1899
An Act to confirm certain Provisional Orders made by the Board of Trade under the Electric Lighting Acts 1882 and 1888 and the Electric Lighting (Scotland) Act 1890 relating to Arbroath Hawick Kirkcaldy and Musselburgh. (Repealed by North of Scotland Electricity Order Confirmation Act 1958 (7 & 8 Eliz. 2. c. ii))
	Arbroath Electric Lighting Order 1899 Provisional Order granted by the Board of Trade under the Electric Lighting Acts 1882 and 1888 and the Electric Lighting (Scotland) Act 1890 to the Magistrates and Town Council of the Burgh of Aberbrothwick or Arbroath in the County of Forfar in respect of that Burgh.	
	Hawick Electric Lighting Order 1899 Provisional Order granted by the Board of Trade under the Electric Lighting Acts 1882 and 1888 and the Electric Lighting (Scotland) Act 1890 to the Urban Electric Supply Company Limited in respect of the Burgh of Hawick in the County of Roxburgh.	
	Kirkcaldy Electric Lighting Order 1899 Provisional Order granted by the Board of Trade under the Electric Lighting Acts 1882 and 1888 and the Electric Lighting (Scotland) Act 1890 to the Provost Magistrates and Town Council of the Royal Burgh of Kirkcaldy in the County of Fife in respect of that Burgh.	
	Musselburgh Electric Lighting Order 1899 Provisional Order granted by the Board of Trade under the Electric Lighting Acts 1882 and 1888 and the Electric Lighting (Scotland Act) 1890 to the Drake and Gorham Electric Power and Traction (Pioneer) Syndicate Limited in respect of the Burgh of Musselburgh in the County of Edinburgh.	
Electric Lighting Orders Confirmation (No. 14) Act 1899	62 & 63 Vict. c. cxxxix	1 August 1899
An Act to confirm certain Provisional Orders made, by the Board of Trade under the Electric Lighting Acts 1882 and 1888 relating to Cray ford Halesowen Handsworth Lye and Wollescote and Lymington.
	Crayford Electricity Supply Order 1899 Provisional Order granted by the Board of Trade under the Electric Lighting Acts 1882 and 1888 to the West Kent Electricity Supply Company Limited in respect of the parish of Crayford in the county of Kent.	
	Halesowen Electric Lighting Order 1899 Provisional Order granted by the Board of Trade under the Electric Lighting Acts 1882 and 1888 to the Rural District Council of Halesowen in respect of the Rural District of Halesowen in the County of Worcester.	
	Handsworth Electric Supply Order 1899 Provisional Order granted by the Board of Trade under the Electric Lighting Acts 1882 and 1888 to the Urban District Council of Handsworth in the County of Stafford in respect of the Urban District of Handsworth.	
	Lye and Wollescote Electric Lighting Order 1899 Provisional Order granted by the Board of Trade under the Electric Lighting Acts 1882 and 1888 to the Urban District Council of Handsworth in the County of Stafford in respect of the Urban District of Handsworth.	
	Lymington Electric Lighting Order 1899 Provisional Order granted by the Board of Trade under the Electric Lighting Acts 1882 and 1888 to the Lymington Electric Light and Power Company Limited in respect of the Borough of Lymington in the County of Hampshire.	
Electric Lighting Orders Confirmation (No. 15) Act 1899	62 & 63 Vict. c. cxl	1 August 1899
An Act to confirm certain Provisional Orders made by the Board of Trade under the Electric Lighting Acts 1882 and 1888 relating to Bethnal Green Blackheath and Greenwich District (Extension) Lewisham District and Plumstead.
	Bethnal Green Electric Lighting Order 1899 Provisional Order granted by the Board of Trade under the Electric Lighting Acts 1882 and 1888 to the Vestry of the Parish of St. Matthew Bethnal Green in the County of London in respect of the Parish of Bethnal Green.	
	Blackheath and Greenwich District (Extension) Electric Lighting Order 1899 Provisional Order granted by the Board of Trade under the Electric Lighting Acts 1882 and 1888 to the Blackheath and Greenwich District Electric Light Company Limited in respect of such part of the Lee District in the Administrative County of London as is not comprised in the area of supply named in the Blackheath and Greenwich District Electric Lighting Order 1897 and for the purpose of amending the said Order.	
	Lewisham District Electric Lighting Order 1899 Provisional Order granted by the Board of Trade under the Electric Lighting Acts 1882 and 1888 to the Board of Works for the Lewisham District in respect of a portion of the Lewisham District.	
	Plumstead Vestry Electric Lighting Order 1899 Provisional Order granted by the Board of Trade under the Electric Lighting Acts 1882 and 1888 to the Vestry of the Parish Plumstead in the County of London in respect of the Parish of Plumstead.	
Electric Lighting Orders Confirmation (No. 17) Act 1899	62 & 63 Vict. c. cxli	1 August 1899
An Act to confirm certain Provisional Orders made by the Board of Trade under the Electric Lighting Acts 1882 and 1888 relating to Carshalton Gateshead Merthyr Tydfil and Newton Abbot.
	Carshalton Electric Lighting Order 1899	
	Gateshead Electric Lighting Order 1899	
	Merthyr Tydfil Electric Lighting Order 1899	
	Newton Abbot Electric Lighting Order 1899	
Gas Orders Confirmation (No. 1) Act 1899	62 & 63 Vict. c. cxlii	1 August 1899
An Act to confirm certain Provisional Orders made by the Board of Trade under the Gas and Water Works Facilities Act 1870 relating to Alton (Hants) Gas Bedworth Gas Elstree and Boreham Wood Gas Limavady Gas and Wellingborough Gas.
	Alton (Hants.) Gas Order 1899	
	Bedworth Gas Order 1899	
	Elstree and Borehamwood Gas Order 1899	
	Limavady Gas Order 1899	
	Wellingborough Gas Order 1899	
Gas and Water Orders Confirmation Act 1899	62 & 63 Vict. c. cxliii	1 August 1899
An Act to confirm certain Provisional Orders made by the Board of Trade under the Gas and Water Works Facilities Act 1870 relating to Herne Bay Gas Hoylake and West Kirby Gas and Water Tunbridge Gas and York Town and Blackwater Gas.
	Herne Bay Gas Order 1899	
	Hoylake and West Kirby Gas and Water Order 1899	
	Tonbridge Gas Order 1899	
	York Town and Blackwater Gas Order 1899	
Water Orders Confirmation Act 1899	62 & 63 Vict. c. cxliv	1 August 1899
An Act to confirm certain Provisional Orders made by the Board of Trade under the Gas and Water Works Facilities Act 1870 relating to Burnham and District Water Harpenden Water Maidstone Water Stourbridge Water and Tilehurst Pangbourne and District Water.
	Burnham (Bucks.) and District Water Order 1899	
	Harpenden Water Order 1899	
	Maidstone Water Order 1899	
	Stourbridge Water Order 1899	
	Tilehurst Pangbourne and District Water Order 1899	
Local Government Board's Provisional Orders Confirmation (No. 4) Act 1899	62 & 63 Vict. c. cxlv	1 August 1899
An Act to confirm certain Provisional Orders of the Local Government Board relating to Bristol Cheltenham Ealing Gelligaer and Rhigos (Rural) Leicester (three) Newmarket Scarborough Tonbridge (Rural) Wallasey and West Ham.
	Bristol Order 1899	
	Cheltenham Order 1899	
	Ealing Order 1899	
	Gelligaer and Rhigos Rural Order 1899	
	Leicester Order (No. 1) 1899	
	Leicester Order (No. 2) 1899	
	Leicester Order (No. 3) 1899	
	Newmarket Order 1899	
	Scarborough Order 1899	
	Tonbridge Rural (Pembury) Order 1899	
	Wallasey Order 1899	
Local Government Board's Provisional Orders Confirmation (No. 6) Act 1899	62 & 63 Vict. c. cxlvi	1 August 1899
An Act to confirm certain Provisional Orders of the Local Government Board relating to Aberavon Barry Brixworth (Rural) Hambledon (Rural) Manchester Pontypridd Rickmansworth and Swadlincote.
	Aberavon Order 1899	
	Barry Order 1899	
	Brixworth Rural Order 1899	
	Hambledon Rural Order 1899	
	Manchester Order (No. 2) 1899	
	Pontypridd Order 1899	
	Rickmansworth Order 1899	
	Swadlincote Order 1899	
Local Government Board's Provisional Orders Confirmation (No. 9) Act 1899	62 & 63 Vict. c. cxlvii	1 August 1899
An Act to confirm certain Provisional Orders of the Local Government Board relating to the Luddenden Foot the Ludworth and Mellor the Oakwell and the Portslade and Southwick United Districts.
	Luddenden Foot Joint Sewerage Order 1899	
	Ludworth and Mellor Joint Sewerage Order 1899	
	Oakwell Joint Hospital Order 1899	
	Portslade and Southwick Outfall Sewerage Order 1899	
Local Government Board's Provisional Orders Confirmation (No. 10) Act 1899	62 & 63 Vict. c. cxlviii	1 August 1899
An Act to confirm certain Provisional Orders of the Local Government Board relating to Itchen Kingston-upon-Hull Ryde and Shifnal (Rural).
	Itchen Order 1899	
	Kingston-upon-Hull Order 1899	
	Ryde Order 1899	
	Shifnal Order 1899	
Local Government Board's Provisional Orders Confirmation (No. 12) Act 1899	62 & 63 Vict. c. cxlix	1 August 1899
An Act to confirm certain Provisional Orders of the Local Government B6ard relating to Bournemouth Bradford (Yorks) and Coventry (two).
	Coventry Order 1899	
	Borough of Bournemouth Order 1899	
	Bradford (Yorkshire) Extension Order 1899	
	Coventry Extension Order 1899	
Local Government Board's Provisional Order Confirmation (No. 15) Act 1899 (repealed)	62 & 63 Vict. c. cl	1 August 1899
An Act to confirm a Provisional Order of the Local Government Board relating to Rhyl. (Repealed by Clwyd County Council Act 1985 (c. xliv))
Tramways Orders Confirmation (No. 1) Act 1899	62 & 63 Vict. c. cli	1 August 1899
An Act to confirm certain Provisional Orders made by the Board of Trade under the Tramways Act 1870 (Note: Tramways Act 1870 (33 & 34 Vict. c. 78)) relating to Aberdeen Corporation Tramways Devonport Corporation Tramways Halifax Corporation Tramways Matlock Urban District Tramways Perth and District Tramways and Reading Corporation Tramways.
	Aberdeen Corporation Tramways Order 1899	
	Devonport Corporation Tramway Order 1899	
	Halifax Corporation Tramways Order 1899	
	Matlock Urban District Tramway Order 1899	
	Perth and District Tramways Order 1899	
	Reading Corporation Tramways Order 1899	
Pier and Harbour Orders Confirmation (No. 2) Act 1899	62 & 63 Vict. c. clii	1 August 1899
An Act to confirm certain. Provisional Orders made by the Board of Trade under the General Pier and Harbour Act 1861 relating to Fleetwood Innellan Montrose and Southwold.
	Fleetwood Pier Order 1899	
	Innellan Pier Order 1899	
	Montrose Harbour Order 1899	
	Southwold Pier Order 1899	
Paisley Corporation Gas Order Confirmation Act 1899	62 & 63 Vict. c. cliii	1 August 1899
An Act to confirm a Provisional Order under the Burgh Police (Scotland) Act 1892 relating to Paisley Corporation Gas Supply.
	Paisley Gas Order 1899	
Leith Harbour and Docks Act 1899 (repealed)	62 & 63 Vict. c. cliv	1 August 1899
An Act to amend the Leith Harbour and Docks Acts 1875 (Note: Leith Harbour and Docks Act 1875 (38 & 39 Vict. c. clx)) and 1892 (Note: Leith Harbour and Docks Act 1892 (55 & 56 Vict. c. clxxvii)) to authorise the letting of ground the construction of additional works the redemption of the annuity to the Corporation of Leith and for other purposes. (Repealed by Leith Harbour and Docks Consolidation Order Confirmation Act 1935 (25 & 26 Geo. 5. c. liv))
Liverpool Overhead Railway Act 1899 (repealed)	62 & 63 Vict. c. clv	1 August 1899
An Act to empower the Liverpool Overhead Railway Company to take on lease certain authorised tramways in the districts of Waterloo-with-Seaforth and Great Crosby to authorise the construction of additional tramways and for other purposes. (Repealed by Liverpool Overhead Railway Act 1956 (4 & 5 Eliz. 2. c. lxxxii))
All Saints' Church (Cardiff) Act 1899	62 & 63 Vict. c. clvi	1 August 1899
An Act to authorise the sale of the Church of All Saints Tyndall Street in the County Borough of Cardiff with the site thereof and the application of the proceeds of sale to the provision of a new church and for other purposes.
Great Grimsby Street Tramways Act 1899 (repealed)	62 & 63 Vict. c. clvii	1 August 1899
An Act to authorise the Great Grimsby Street Tramways Company to extend their tramways and for other purposes. (Repealed by Humberside Act 1982 (c. iii))
West Gloucestershire Water Act 1899	62 & 63 Vict. c. clviii	1 August 1899
An Act for extending the limits of supply of the West Gloucestershire Water Company and for authorising the Company to raise further capital and for other purposes.
Lowestoft Water and Gas Act 1899	62 & 63 Vict. c. clix	1 August 1899
An Act to confer further powers on the Lowestoft Water and Gas Company in connexion with their water undertaking and for other purposes.
Totland Waterworks Act 1899 (repealed)	62 & 63 Vict. c. clx	1 August 1899
An Act for incorporating and conferring powers on the Totland Waterworks Company and for other purposes, (Repealed by Isle of Wight Rural District Council Order 1949 (SI 1949/1537))
Brighton Marine Palace and Pier Act 1899	62 & 63 Vict. c. clxi	1 August 1899
An Act to extend the period limited for the construction and completion of the Brighton Marine Palace and Pier and for other purposes.
Glasgow Corporation (Gas and Water) Act 1899 (repealed)	62 & 63 Vict. c. clxii	1 August 1899
An Act to confer further powers on the Corporation of Glasgow in relation to their gas water and electricity undertakings and for other purposes. (Repealed by Glasgow Corporation Consolidation (Water, Transport and Markets) Order Confirmation Act 1964 (c. xliii))
Millwall Dock Act 1899 (repealed)	62 & 63 Vict. c. clxiii	1 August 1899
An Act to rectify the accounts of the Millwall Dock Company and legalise expenditure of capital and to amend the Acts of the Company relating to the raising of capital. (Repealed by Port of London (Consolidation) Act 1920 (10 & 11 Geo. 5. c. clxxiii))
Ayr Burgh Act 1899	62 & 63 Vict. c. clxiv	1 August 1899
An Act to authorise the Provost Magistrates and Town Council of the Burgh of Ayr to construct and work tramways and for making further and better provision in regard to the water supply the common good the cemetery the markets and slaughter houses of the Burgh and for other purposes.
Furness Railway Act 1899	62 & 63 Vict. c. clxv	1 August 1899
An Act for conferring further powers on the Furness Railway Company for the construction of works the raising of capital and otherwise in relation to their undertaking and for other purposes.
Glasgow Corporation (Tramways Libraries, &c.) Act 1899	62 & 63 Vict. c. clxvi	1 August 1899
An Act to authorise the Corporation of the City of Glasgow to construct new tramways to establish libraries to extend the boundaries of the City to raise further moneys and for other purposes.
Kirkcaldy Corporation and Tramways Act 1899 (repealed)	62 & 63 Vict. c. clxvii	1 August 1899
An Act for empowering the Provost Magistrates and Town Council of the Royal Burgh of Kirkcaldy to construct Tramways and street improvements and for making certain other provisions in relation to the said Burgh and for other purposes. (Repealed by Kirkcaldy Corporation Order Confirmation Act 1939 (2 & 3 Geo. 6. c. vi))
South Eastern and London, Chatham and Dover Railways Act 1899	62 & 63 Vict. c. clxviii	1 August 1899
An Act to provide for the working union of the South Eastern and London Chatham and Dover Railway Companies and for other purposes.
Birmingham Corporation Act 1899 (repealed)	62 & 63 Vict. c. clxix	1 August 1899
An Act to authorise the transfer of the undertaking of the Birmingham Electric Supply Company Limited to the Corporation of Birmingham to make further provision as to the Birmingham School of Art and as to the Rubery Hill Lunatic Asylum Loans and for other purposes. (Repealed by West Midlands County Council Act 1980 (c. xi))
Milton Creek Conservancy Act 1899	62 & 63 Vict. c. clxx	1 August 1899
An Act for constituting incorporating and conferring powers upon the Conservators of Milton Creek and for other purposes.
Woking Water and Gas Act 1899	62 & 63 Vict. c. clxxi	1 August 1899
An Act for conferring further powers on the Woking Water and Gas Company for the construction of works and for authorising the Company to raise further moneys and for extending their limits for supply of water and for other purposes.
Mersey Docks (Pilotage, &c.) Act 1899	62 & 63 Vict. c. clxxii	1 August 1899
An Act to make further provision with reference to the employment of pilots in the Port of Liverpool and for other purposes.
Greenock and Port Glasgow Tramways Act 1899	62 & 63 Vict. c. clxxiii	1 August 1899
An Act to authorise the use of electrical power on tramways at Greenock Port Glasgow and Gourock and for other purposes.
Brooke's Park (Londonderry) Act 1899	62 & 63 Vict. c. clxxiv	1 August 1899
An Act for conferring powers upon the Trustees of the Will of the late James Hood Brooke to acquire Gwyns Grounds Londonderry and lay out the same as a public park and for other purposes.
Owens College Act 1899 (repealed)	62 & 63 Vict. c. clxxv	1 August 1899
An Act to amend the constitution of the Owens College Manchester for conferring further powers on the President and Governors and for other purposes. (Repealed by University of Manchester Act 2004 (c. iv))
Lincoln and East Coast Railway and Dock Act 1899 (repealed)	62 & 63 Vict. c. clxxvi	1 August 1899
An Act to authorise the Lincoln and East Coast Railway and Dock Company to alter the line and levels of portions of their authorised railways and to construct certain new and substituted railways in connexion with their undertaking and for other purposes. (Repealed by Lincoln and East Coast Railway and Dock (Abandonment) Act 1902 (2 Edw. 7. c. iii))
Lowestoft Promenade Pier Act 1899	62 & 63 Vict. c. clxxvii	1 August 1899
An Act for authorising the construction of a pier at Lowestoft and for other purposes.
Midland and South Western Junction Railway Act 1899	62 & 63 Vict. c. clxxviii	1 August 1899
An Act to confer further powers on the Midland and South Western Junction Railway Company to authorise them to acquire the undertaking of the Marlborough and Grafton Railway Company and for other purposes.
Bristol Gas Act 1899	62 & 63 Vict. c. clxxix	1 August 1899
An Act to enable the Bristol Gas Company to erect works for the storage of gas to raise additional capital and for other purposes.
South Hants Water Act 1899	62 & 63 Vict. c. clxxx	1 August 1899
An Act to authorise the South Hants Waterworks Company to make additional waterworks to extend the limits of supply of the Company to raise additional capital to confer further powers upon the Company and for other purposes.
Goole Urban District Council Act 1899	62 & 63 Vict. c. clxxxi	1 August 1899
An Act to authorise the Urban District Council of Goole in the West Riding of the County of York to construct additional waterworks to borrow money for the purposes thereof and of their gas and water undertakings and for other purposes.
Great Yarmouth Corporation Act 1899	62 & 63 Vict. c. clxxxii	1 August 1899
An Act to empower the Corporation of Great Yarmouth to construct tramways and street improvements to make further provision in regard to the electric lighting undertaking of the Corporation and for other purposes.
Buenos Aires and Pacific Railway Company Act 1899	62 & 63 Vict. c. clxxxiii	1 August 1899
An Act for authorising the Buenos Ayres and Pacific Railway Company Limited to prepare and carry into effect a scheme or schemes of arrangement with their shareholders or with any class or classes of shareholders and to increase and consolidate its capital and for other purposes.
Blackpool Improvement Act 1899	62 & 63 Vict. c. clxxxiv	1 August 1899
An Act to enable the Mayor Aldermen and Burgesses of the Borough of Blackpool to construct further parade works and additional tramways and to make further provisions for the improvement and good government of the said Borough and for other purposes.
Central London Railway Act 1899	62 & 63 Vict. c. clxxxv	1 August 1899
An Act to extend the time for the completion of the Central London Railway and for other purposes.
Fishguard and Rosslare Railways and Harbours Act 1899	62 & 63 Vict. c. clxxxvi	1 August 1899
An Act to empower the Fishguard and Rosslare Railways and Harbours Company to construct additional harbour works at Fishguard and a new railway in lieu of their authorised Cork and Fermoy Railway and to authorise the Great Western and Great Southern and Western Railway Companies to subscribe to and guarantee the capital of the said Company and for other purposes.
Great Western Railway Act 1899	62 & 63 Vict. c. clxxxvii	1 August 1899
An Act for conferring further powers upon the Great Western Railway Company in respect of their own undertaking and upon that Company and the London and North Western Railway Company in respect of undertakings in which they are jointly interested for vesting the undertaking of the Golden Valley Railway Company in the Great Western Railway Company and for other purposes.
Manchester Corporation (General Powers) Act 1899	62 & 63 Vict. c. clxxxviii	1 August 1899
An Act to confer further powers upon the Lord Mayor Aldermen and Citizens of the City of Manchester for the construction of works and the acquisition of lands and with respect to the regulation of street criers sale of ice creams and with reference to milk and other matters affecting the health and good government of the City and to enlarge their powers in connexion with the supply of electricity and for other purposes.
Lea Bridge District Gas Act 1899	62 & 63 Vict. c. clxxxix	1 August 1899
An Act to extend the powers of the Lea Bridge District Gas Company and amend the Acts affecting that Company and for other purposes.
Sunderland Corporation Act 1899	62 & 63 Vict. c. cxc	1 August 1899
An Act to enable the Mayor Aldermen and Burgesses of the Borough of Sunderland to construct additional tramways in and adjacent to the Borough and for other purposes.
Menstone Waterworks Act 1899	62 & 63 Vict. c. cxci	1 August 1899
An Act for incorporating and conferring powers on the Menstone Waterworks Company.
Baker Street and Waterloo Railway Act 1899	62 & 63 Vict. c. cxcii	1 August 1899
An Act to enable the Baker Street and Waterloo Railway Company to make new railways and works to confer further powers upon the Company and for other purposes.
Derby Corporation Tramways, &c. Act 1899 (repealed)	62 & 63 Vict. c. cxciii	1 August 1899
An Act to empower the Corporation of Derby to acquire and work the undertaking of the Derby Tramways Company Limited to confer further powers on the Corporation with reference to the government of the Borough and for other purposes. (Repealed by Derbyshire Act 1981 (c. xxxiv))
London United Tramways Act 1899	62 & 63 Vict. c. cxciv	1 August 1899
An Act for empowering the London United Tramways Limited to widen a certain road at Brentford to use mechanical power on their tramways in London and for other purposes.
Redditch Gas Act 1899	62 & 63 Vict. c. cxcv	1 August 1899
An Act for incorporating and conferring powers on the Redditch Gas Company.
Stockport Corporation Act 1899	62 & 63 Vict. c. cxcvi	1 August 1899
An Act to confer further powers upon the Corporation of the County Borough of Stockport with respect to tramways and to their electric lighting and other undertakings to make further provision for the improvement and good government of the Borough to amend and extend the provisions of the Local Acts relating to the Borough and for other purposes.
Loughborough Corporation Act 1899	62 & 63 Vict. c. cxcvii	1 August 1899
An Act to empower the Mayor Aldermen and Burgesses of the Borough of Loughborough to purchase the undertaking of the Loughborough Gas Company and to supply gas and electricity to extend the water limits of the said Corporation and for other purposes.
Mersey Docks (Finance) Act 1899 (repealed)	62 & 63 Vict. c. cxcviii	1 August 1899
An Act to authorise the Mersey Docks and Harbour Board to create redeemable stock and to enable the Board to raise money temporarily by bills of exchange or promissory notes and for other purposes. (Repealed by Mersey Docks and Harbour Act 1971 (c. lvii))
Port Talbot Railway and Docks Act 1899	62 & 63 Vict. c. cxcix	1 August 1899
An Act to enable the Port Talbot Railway and Docks Company to maintain certain deviations of their railways and works authorised by the Port Talbot Railway and Docks Act 1894 (Note: Port Talbot Railway and Docks Act 1894 (57 & 58 Vict. c. cxli)) the Port Talbot Railway and Docks (Ogmore Valleys Extension) Act 1896 (Note: Port Talbot Railway and Docks (Ogmore Valleys Extension) Act 1896 (59 & 60 Vict. c. cxlv)) and the Port Talbot Railway and Docks (South Wales Mineral Railway Junction) Act 1896 (Note: Port Talbot Railway and Docks (South Wales Mineral Railway Junction) Act 1896 (59 & 60 Vict. c. ccxii)) and for other purposes.
Whitehaven Corporation Act 1899	62 & 63 Vict. c. cc	1 August 1899
An Act to confer further powers on the Corporation of Whitehaven with respect to their water and electric lighting undertakings to extend the Borough of Whitehaven to consolidate the rates of the Borough and simplify the collection thereof and for other purposes.
Humber Conservancy Act 1899	62 & 63 Vict. c. cci	1 August 1899
An Act to extend and amend the Humber Conservancy Acts 1852 to 1876 and to confer further powers on the Humber Conservancy Commissioners and for other purposes.
Great Northern Railway Act 1899	62 & 63 Vict. c. ccii	1 August 1899
An Act to confer further powers upon the Great Northern Railway Company.
Great Northern and Strand Railway Act 1899	62 & 63 Vict. c. cciii	1 August 1899
An Act for incorporating the Great Northern and Strand Railway Company and for empowering them to construct an Underground Railway from the parish of Saint Clement Danes in the Administrative County of London and for other purposes.
Great Western and Great Central Railways Act 1899	62 & 63 Vict. c. cciv	1 August 1899
An Act for incorporating and conferring powers upon a Joint Committee of the Great Western and Great Central Railway Companies and for vesting in them certain existing and authorised railways of the Great Western Railway Company and authorising them to construct a new railway and other works and for other purposes.
London, Brighton and South Coast Railway (Various Powers) Act 1899	62 & 63 Vict. c. ccv	1 August 1899
An Act to empower the London Brighton and South Coast Railway Company to widen their existing railways and to purchase additional lands and for other purposes.
South Eastern and London, Chatham and Dover Railways (New Lines, &c.) Act 1899	62 & 63 Vict. c. ccvi	1 August 1899
An Act for conferring further powers on the South Eastern and London Chatham and Dover Railway Companies with reference to the construction of new railways and for other purposes.
Stockport Corporation Water Act 1899	62 & 63 Vict. c. ccvii	1 August 1899
An Act to authorise the Mayor Aldermen and Burgesses of the County Borough of Stockport to purchase the undertaking of the Stockport District Waterworks Company and for other purposes.
Walker and Wallsend Union Gas Company (Electric Lighting) Act 1899	62 & 63 Vict. c. ccviii	1 August 1899
An Act to empower the Walker and Wallsend Union Gas Company to supply electricity within certain parts of their limits of gas supply.
Godalming Corporation Water Act 1899	62 & 63 Vict. c. ccix	1 August 1899
An Act to authorise the Mayor Aldermen and Burgesses of the Borough of Godalming to purchase the undertaking of the Frith Hill Godalming and Farncombe Water Company Limited and to supply water throughout the Borough and adjoining places.
London and North Western Railway (New Railways) Act 1899	62 & 63 Vict. c. ccx	1 August 1899
An Act for empowering the London and North Western Railway Company to construct new railways in the Counties of Warwick Chester Lancaster and Anglesey and for other purposes.
Sheffield Corporation (Markets) Act 1899 (repealed)	62 & 63 Vict. c. ccxi	1 August 1899
An Act for empowering the Corporation of the City of Sheffield to purchase from the Duke of Norfolk his markets and fairs within the City and for other purposes. (Repealed by Sheffield Corporation (Consolidation) Act 1918 (8 & 9 Geo. 5. c. lxi))
Weston-super-Mare Grand Pier Act 1899	62 & 63 Vict. c. ccxii	1 August 1899
An Act to extend the time for the completion of the authorised pier and works of the Weston-super-Mare Grand Pier Company and for other purposes.
London and North Western Railway (Additional Powers) Act 1899	62 & 63 Vict. c. ccxiii	9 August 1899
An Act for conferring further powers upon the London and North Western Railway Company in relation to their own undertaking and upon that Company and the Great Western Railway Company in relation to their joint undertaking and for other purposes.
Renfrew Burgh and Harbour Extension Act 1899	62 & 63 Vict. c. ccxiv	9 August 1899
An Act to extend the municipal and police boundaries of the Burgh of Renfrew to authorise the construction of a tidal dock or basin and other works at the Harbour and for other purposes.
Caledonian Railway (General Powers) Act 1899	62 & 63 Vict. c. ccxv	9 August 1899
An Act to confer further powers on the Caledonian Railway Company in relation to their undertaking to authorise them to deviate certain railways of the North British Railway Company and the Forth and Clyde Junction Railway Company at Stirling to empower the Callander and Oban and Lochearnhead St. Fillans and Comrie Railway Companies to widen and deviate portions of their railways to enable the Caledonian Railway Company to subscribe to the undertaking of the last-named Company and for other purposes.
Aberdeen Joint Passenger Station Act 1899	62 & 63 Vict. c. ccxvi	9 August 1899
An Act to authorise the Caledonian Railway Company and the Great North of Scotland Railway Company to alter and enlarge their Aberdeen Joint Passenger Station and to construct certain railways and works in connexion therewith and for other purposes.
Leigh-on-Sea Urban District Council Act 1899 (repealed)	62 & 63 Vict. c. ccxvii	9 August 1899
An Act to authorise the Urban District Council of Leigh-on-Sea in the County of Essex to construct and maintain gas works and for other purposes. (Repealed by Essex Act 1987 (c. xx))
Moss Side Tramways Act 1899	62 & 63 Vict. c. ccxviii	9 August 1899
An Act to empower the Urban District Council for the District of Moss Side to work any tramway for the time being belonging to or leased by them and for other purposes.
Stretford Tramways Act 1899	62 & 63 Vict. c. ccxix	9 August 1899
An Act to empower the Urban District Council for the District of Stretford to work any tramway for the time being belonging to or leased by them and for other purposes.
Withington Tramways Act 1899	62 & 63 Vict. c. ccxx	9 August 1899
An Act to empower the Urban District Council for the District of Withington to work any tramway for the time being belonging to or leased by them and for other purposes.
Weston Clevedon and Portishead Light Railways Act 1899	62 & 63 Vict. c. ccxxi	9 August 1899
An Act to empower the Weston-super-Mare Clevedon and Portishead Tramways Company to construct light railways in the County of Somerset and for other purposes.
Yeadon and Guiseley Gas Act 1899 (repealed)	62 & 63 Vict. c. ccxxii	9 August 1899
An Act to alter and amend the Yeadon and Guiseley Gas Act 1868 (Note: Yeadon and Guiseley Gas Act 1868 (31 & 32 Vict. c. xlviii)) by substituting for the maximum price of gas supplied by the Yeadon and Guiseley Gas Light and Coke Company a standard price with a sliding scale of profits dependent on the price charged above or below such standard / price. (Repealed by West Yorkshire Act 1980 (c. xiv))
South Staffordshire Tramways Act 1899	62 & 63 Vict. c. ccxxiii	9 August 1899
An Act for conferring further powers upon the South Staffordshire Tramways Company with respect to the leasing of tramways and for other purposes.
Darwen Corporation Act 1899	62 & 63 Vict. c. ccxxiv	9 August 1899
An Act to confer powers upon the Corporation of the Borough of Darwen with respect to the working and construction of tramways in the borough to confer further powers on the said Corporation with respect to their waterworks undertaking and in regard to streets buildings sewers and drains and for the health local government and improvement of the Borough to make further provisions for the collection and recovery of rates for the borrowing of money and for other purposes.
Warrington Corporation Act 1899 (repealed)	62 & 63 Vict. c. ccxxv	9 August 1899
An Act to make further provision in regard to the water supply of the Borough of Warrington and to improve the local government of that town. (Repealed by Cheshire County Council Act 1980 (c. xiii))
Worcestershire County Council (Transfer of Parish of Yardley) Act 1899 (repealed)	62 & 63 Vict. c. ccxxvi	9 August 1899
An Act to authorise the re-transfer to the Justices of the Peace for the County of Worcester and to the Worcestershire County Council of the Parish of Yardley in the County of Worcester for police and all other purposes from the Justices of the Peace for the County of Warwick and the Warwickshire County Council and for other purposes. (Repealed by Statute Law (Repeals) Act 1995 (c. 44))
Glasgow and South Western Railway Act 1899	62 & 63 Vict. c. ccxxvii	9 August 1899
An Act for conferring further powers on the Glasgow and South Western Railway Company for the construction of works and the acquisition of lands for vesting in them the undertakings of the Largs Harbour Company and the Kilmarnock and Troon Railway Company for making provision with reference to the election of Rothesay Harbour Trustees for empowering the Company to raise additional capital and for other purposes.
Great Eastern Railway (General Powers) Act 1899	62 & 63 Vict. c. ccxxviii	9 August 1899
An Act to confer further powers upon the Great Eastern Railway Company to authorise them to execute further works to acquire additional lands and to raise further money and for other purposes.
Great Yarmouth Waterworks Act 1899	62 & 63 Vict. c. ccxxix	9 August 1899
An Act to extend the limits of supply of the Great Yarmouth Waterworks Company and to authorise that Company to construct new works to raise further money and for other purposes.
North Eastern Railway Act 1899	62 & 63 Vict. c. ccxxx	9 August 1899
An Act to confer additional powers upon the North Eastern Railway Company for the construction of new railways and other works and the acquisition of additional lands and for transferring to the Company the powers of the North Holderness Light Railway Company and for other purposes.
North Staffordshire Railway Act 1899	62 & 63 Vict. c. ccxxxi	9 August 1899
An Act to confer further powers on the North Staffordshire Railway Company.
Wolverhampton Tramways Act 1899	62 & 63 Vict. c. ccxxxii	9 August 1899
An Act to empower the Wolverhampton Tramways Company Limited to alter the gauge of certain of their tramways and to work the same by mechanical power and for other purposes.
Hastings Harbour Act 1899	62 & 63 Vict. c. ccxxxiii	9 August 1899
An Act to authorise the Corporation of Hastings to enter into agreements with the Hastings Harbour Commissioners to guarantee the payment by the Corporation of interest upon capital for the completion of Hastings Harbour to provide for the transfer of the Harbour undertaking to the Corporation and for other purposes.
Oystermouth Railway or Tramroad Act 1899 (repealed)	62 & 63 Vict. c. ccxxxiv	9 August 1899
An Act to authorise the abandonment of a portion of the Oystermouth Railway or Tramroad for the lease, of the undertaking and of the Mumbles Railway and Pier to the Swansea Improvements and Tramways Company and for other purposes. (Repealed by South Wales Transport Act 1959 (7 & 8 Eliz. 2. c. l))
Bootle Corporation Act 1899 (repealed)	62 & 63 Vict. c. ccxxxv	9 August 1899
An Act to increase the number of the members of the Council of Bootle to increase the number of the wards of the Borough and to make further provision for the health local government and improvement of the borough and for other purposes. (Repealed by County of Merseyside Act 1980 (c. x))
Dublin Corporation (Markets) Act 1899	62 & 63 Vict. c. ccxxxvi	9 August 1899
An Act to amend the enactments relating to markets in the City of Dublin and to the borrowing powers of the Corporation of Dublin and for other purposes.
London County Council (General Powers) Act 1899	62 & 63 Vict. c. ccxxxvii	9 August 1899
An Act to enable the London County Council to construct railway sidings at Horton Asylum (Surrey) and to purchase lands for various purposes to extend the time limited for the purchase of certain lands and the completion of certain works and for other purposes.
London County Council (Money) Act 1899 (repealed)	62 & 63 Vict. c. ccxxxviii	9 August 1899
An Act to regulate the expenditure of money by the London County Council on capital account during the current financial period and the raising of money to meet such expenditure. (Repealed by London County Council (Finance Consolidation) Act 1912 (2 & 3 Geo. 5. c. cv))
Clyde Navigation Act 1899	62 & 63 Vict. c. ccxxxix	9 August 1899
An Act to authorise the Trustees of the Clyde Navigation to construct a new tidal dock river wall high level cross ferry recesses and other works to borrow additional money to confirm agreements with railway companies respecting Prince's Dock Branch Railway and for other purposes.
Cromer Protection Act 1899	62 & 63 Vict. c. ccxl	9 August 1899
An Act to make further provision for protecting Cromer from encroachment of the sea to authorise the construction of a pier and for other purposes.
Oldham Corporation Act 1899	62 & 63 Vict. c. ccxli	9 August 1899
An Act to empower the Corporation of Oldham to construct additional tramways to make a new street to confer further powers upon the Corporation and other authorities with regard to tramways in and near the Borough and for other purposes.
Hull Joint Dock Act 1899	62 & 63 Vict. c. ccxlii	9 August 1899
An Act for enabling the North Eastern Railway Company and the Hull Barnsley and West Riding Junction Railway and Dock Company to make a dock and railways at Hull and for other purposes.
Fylde Water Board Act 1899	62 & 63 Vict. c. ccxliii	9 August 1899
An Act to confirm an agreement between the Fylde Waterworks Company and the Fylde Water Board for the sale and purchase of the Company's undertaking to consolidate and amend the Acts relating to the Company and for other purposes.
Salford Corporation Act 1899	62 & 63 Vict. c. ccxliv	9 August 1899
An Act to enable the Mayor Aldermen and Burgesses of the Borough of Salford to reconstruct their existing and to construct additional tramways to make street improvements and to raise additional moneys by mortgage and by the creation and issue of stock and to make further provisions for the good government of the Borough.
Wakefield Corporation Act 1899 (repealed)	62 & 63 Vict. c. ccxlv	9 August 1899
An Act to make further provision in regard to the water undertaking of the Corporation of Wakefield and to the health local government and improvement of the City and for other purposes. (Repealed by West Yorkshire Act 1980 (c. xiv))
Belfast Corporation Act 1899	62 & 63 Vict. c. ccxlvi	9 August 1899
An Act to empower the Lord Mayor Aldermen and Citizens of the City of Belfast to lay down tramways to make works and to purchase lands for cemetery purposes to amend several of the Local Acts in force in Belfast and to confer various powers on the Corporation.
City and Brixton Railway Act 1899	62 & 63 Vict. c. ccxlvii	9 August 1899
An Act to confer further powers on the City and Brixton Railway Company for the construction of an extension railway and works in the County of London and for other purposes.
Gateshead and District Tramways Act 1899	62 & 63 Vict. c. ccxlviii	9 August 1899
An Act to enable the Gateshead and District Tramways Company to lay down and maintain additional tramways and works and for other purposes.
London, Walthamstow and Epping Forest Railway Act 1899 (repealed)	62 & 63 Vict. c. ccxlix	9 August 1899
An Act to authorise the London Walthamstow and Epping Forest Railway Company to construct a new railway to connect with the Great Eastern Railway to abandon a portion of their authorised railway and for other purposes. (Repealed by Statute Law (Repeals) Act 2013 (c. 2))
West Metropolitan Railway Act 1899 (repealed)	62 & 63 Vict. c. ccl	9 August 1899
An Act for incorporating the West Metropolitan Railway Company and for empowering them to construct railways from the Hammersmith and City Railway in the County of London to Acton in the County of Middlesex and for other purposes. (Repealed by Statute Law (Repeals) Act 2013 (c. 2))
Bexhill and Rotherfield Railway Act 1899 (repealed)	62 & 63 Vict. c. ccli	9 August 1899
An Act for incorporating the Bexhill and Rotherfield Railway Company and for other purposes. (Repealed by Bexhill and Rotherfield Railway (Abandonment) Act 1902 (2 Edw. 7. c. cclx))
Birmingham, North Warwickshire and Stratford-upon-Avon Railway Act 1899	62 & 63 Vict. c. cclii	9 August 1899
An Act to empower the Birmingham North Warwickshire and Stratford-upon-Avon Railway Company to make new railways in the Counties of Worcester and Warwick and for other purposes.
South Western Railway Act 1899	62 & 63 Vict. c. ccliii	9 August 1899
An Act to confer further powers upon the London and South Western Railway Company to authorise them to execute further works to acquire additional lands and to raise further money and for other purposes.
Manchester Corporation Tramways Act 1899	62 & 63 Vict. c. ccliv	9 August 1899
An Act to confer further powers upon the Corporation of Manchester and neighbouring authorities in respect of tramways within and beyond the City and for other purposes.
Paisley and Barrhead District Railway Act 1899	62 & 63 Vict. c. cclv	9 August 1899
An Act to empower the Paisley and Barrhead District Railway Company to construct new railways and for other purposes.
Portsmouth Corporation Act 1899	62 & 63 Vict. c. cclvi	9 August 1899
An Act to consolidate the Parishes within the County Borough of Portsmouth and to confer further powers on the Corporation of Portsmouth and for other purposes.
Rochdale Canal Act 1899	62 & 63 Vict. c. cclvii	9 August 1899
An Act to make new provisions with regard to the constitution and to change the name of the Company of Proprietors of the Rochdale Canal to fix and regulate the capital and borrowing powers of the Company to amend the Acts relating to and confer further powers on the Company and for other purposes.
Southport District Tramroad Act 1899	62 & 63 Vict. c. cclviii	9 August 1899
An Act to authorise the construction of a tramroad in and near to Southport and for other purposes.
Wolverhampton Corporation Act 1899 (repealed)	62 & 63 Vict. c. cclix	9 August 1899
An Act to empower the Corporation of Wolverhampton to construct tramways and street improvements and to make further provision in regard to tramways in and in the neighbourhood of Wolverhampton and in regard to the electric lighting and water undertakings of the Corporation and the finance of the Borough and for other purposes. (Repealed by Wolverhampton Corporation Act 1969 (c. lx))
Workington Corporation Act 1899	62 & 63 Vict. c. cclx	9 August 1899
An Act for extending the limits of the Borough of Workington and for making further and better provision in regard to the water supply thereof.
North West London Railway Act 1899	62 & 63 Vict. c. cclxi	9 August 1899
An Act for incorporating the North West London Railway Company and for empowering them to construct underground railways from Marble Arch to Cricklewood and for other purposes.
Brompton and Piccadilly Circus Railway (Extensions) Act 1899	62 & 63 Vict. c. cclxii	9 August 1899
An Act to confer further powers on the Brompton and Piccadilly Circus Railway Company for the construction of extension railways and works in the county of London and for other purposes.
Leeds Corporation Act 1899 (repealed)	62 & 63 Vict. c. cclxiii	9 August 1899
An Act to empower the Corporation of Leeds to extend their Kirkgate Market to erect a hall to construct street works and a tramway and for other purposes. (Repealed by West Yorkshire Act 1980 (c. xiv))
Charing Cross, Euston and Hampstead Railway Act 1899	62 & 63 Vict. c. cclxiv	9 August 1899
An Act to confer further powers on the Charing Cross Euston and Hampstead Railway Company for authorising agreements with the Midland South Eastern and London and North Western Railway Companies and for other purposes.
Newcastle-upon-Tyne Tramways and Improvement Act 1899	62 & 63 Vict. c. cclxv	9 August 1899
An Act to enable the Mayor Aldermen and Citizens of the City and County of Newcastle-upon-Tyne to construct additional tramways street improvements and other works and to make further provision for the good government of the City and for other purposes.
London County Council (Improvements) Act 1899	62 & 63 Vict. c. cclxvi	9 August 1899
An Act to empower the London County Council to make a new street (Note: Kingsway, London.) from Holborn to the Strand and a widening of Southampton Row to widen High Street Kensington and to make other street improvements and works in the administrative County of London and for other purposes.
Harrow and Uxbridge Railway Act 1899	62 & 63 Vict. c. cclxvii	9 August 1899
An Act to empower the Harrow and Uxbridge Railway Company to make certain extensions to connect their authorised railway with the Metropolitan Railway and for other purposes.
Uxbridge and Rickmansworth Railway Act 1899	62 & 63 Vict. c. cclxviii	9 August 1899
An Act to authorise the Uxbridge and Rickmansworth Railway Company to abandon portions of their undertaking and to construct a new or substituted railway in lieu thereof and for other purposes.
Derwent Valley Water Act 1899	62 & 63 Vict. c. cclxix	9 August 1899
An Act to authorise the construction of works for impounding and distributing the waters of the Rivers Derwent and Ashop and their tributaries and to constitute a joint board representative of the Corporations of Derby Leicester Nottingham and Sheffield and of the County Council of Derbyshire for the purposes of such construction and to confer further powers in relation to the supply of water on the said Corporations and County Council and for other purposes.
Bradford Tramways and Improvement Act 1899 (repealed)	62 & 63 Vict. c. cclxx	9 August 1899
An Act to authorise the Mayor Aldermen and Citizens of the City of Bradford in the County of York to construct additional tramways in and near the City to purchase Baildon Moor and other lands to make further provision for the improvement of the City and for other purposes. (Repealed by West Yorkshire Act 1980 (c. xiv))
Gas Orders Confirmation (No. 2) Act 1899	62 & 63 Vict. c. cclxxi	9 August 1899
An Act to confirm certain Provisional Orders made by the Board of Trade under the Gas and Water Works Facilities Act 1870 relating to Farnham Gas Freshwater Gas Morecambe Gas and Newtown and Llanllwchaiam Gas.
	Farnham Gas Order 1899 Order empowering the Farnham Gas Company Limited to construct maintain and continue Gasworks and to manufacture and supply Gas in the Parishes of Farnham and Farnham Rural in the County of Surrey and for other purposes.	
	Freshwater Gas Order 1899 Order empowering the Freshwater Gas Company Limited to construct and maintain Gasworks and to make and supply Gas within the Townships and Parishes of Freshwater and Totland all in the Isle of Wight and County of Southampton.	
	Morecambe Gas Order 1899 Order empowering the Morecambe Gas and Light Company to raise additional Capital and for other purposes.	
	Newtown and Llanllwchaiarn Gas Order 1899 Order empowering the Newtown and Llanllwchaiarn Gas and Coke Company Limited to maintain and continue Gasworks and to manufacture and supply Gas in the Urban District Newtown and Llanllwchaiarn in the County of Montgomery and for other purposes.	
Local Government Board's Provisional Orders Confirmation (No. 14) Act 1899	62 & 63 Vict. c. cclxxii	9 August 1899
An Act to confirm certain Provisional Orders of the Local Government Board relating to Isle of Thanet (Rural) Ramsgate and Reading.
	Isle of Thanet Rural Order 1899 Provisional Order to enable the Rural District Council of the Isle of Thanet to put in force the Compulsory Clauses of the Lands Clauses Acts.	
	Ramsgate Order (No. 3) 1899 Provisional Order for altering a Local Act (Note: Ramsgate Improvement Act 1878 (41 & 42 Vict. c. cxciii)) and a Confirming Act. (Note: Local Government Board's Provisional Orders Confirmation (Kingston-upon-Hull, &c.) Act 1880 (43 & 44 Vict. c. lxxxiv))	
	Reading Water Order 1899 Provisional Order for altering certain Local Acts and Confirming Acts.	
Tramways Orders Confirmation (No. 2) Act 1899	62 & 63 Vict. c. cclxxiii	9 August 1899
An Act to confirm certain Provisional Orders made by the Board of Trade under the Tramways Act 1870 relating to Audenshaw Urban District Tramways Clayton Tramways Eccles Corporation Tramways Ilkeston Corporation Tramways Queensbury Tramway and Southport Corporation Tramways.
	Audenshaw Urban District Tramway Order 1899 Order authorising the Urban District Council of Audenshaw to construct a Tramway in their District and for other purposes.	
	Clayton Tramway Order 1899 Order authorising the Urban District Council of Clayton to construct a Tramway in their District and for other purposes.	
	Eccles Corporation Tramways Order 1899 Order authorising the Mayor Aldermen and Burgesses of the Borough of Eccles to work Tramways in their Borough and for other purposes.	
	Ilkeston Corporation Tramways Order 1899 Order authorising the Mayor Aldermen and Burgesses of the Borough of Ilkeston to construct Tramways in their Borough.	
	Queensbury Tramway Order 1899 Order authorising the Urban District Council of Queensbury to construct a Tramway in their district and for other purposes.	
	Southport Corporation Tramways Order 1899 Order authorising the Mayor Aldermen and Burgesses of the Borough of Southport to construct Tramways and for other purposes.	
Tramways Orders Confirmation (No. 3) Act 1899	62 & 63 Vict. c. cclxxiv	9 August 1899
An Act to confirm certain Provisional Orders made by the Board of Trade under the Tramways Act 1870 relating to Barking Town Urban District Tramways Blackpool Corporation Tramways Dudley and Wolverhampton Tramways Gravesend Rosherville and Northfleet Tramways Ilford Urban District Tramways and Wrexham District Tramways.
	Barking Town Urban District Tramways Order 1899	
	Blackpool Corporation Tramways Order 1899 Order authorising the Mayor Aldermen and Burgesses of the Borough of Blackpool to construct additional Tramways in the said Borough.	
	Dudley and Wolverhampton Tramways Order 1899 Order providing for the Sale to and Purchase by the Mayor Aldermen and Burgesses of the Borough of Wolverhampton of the portion within the Borough of the Tramways of the Dudley and Wolverhampton Tramways Company Limited and authorising that Company to alter the Gauge of their remaining Tramways and to work the same by Mechanical Power.	
	Gravesend Rosherville and Northfleet Tramways Order 1899 Order authorising the Gravesend Rosherville and Northfleet Tramways Company Limited to construct additional Tramways in the Parishes or Townships of Gravesend Milton Northfleet and Swanscombe in the County of Kent and to work the same and also their existing Tramways by Electrical Power to sell their Undertaking to the Drake and Gorham Electric Power and Traction Company Limited and for other purposes.	
	Ilford Urban District Tramways Order 1899 Order authorising the Urban District Council of Ilford to construct Tramways in their District and for other purposes.	
	Wrexham District Tramways Order 1899 Order authorising the Wrexham Tramways Limited to construct additional and substituted Tramways in the Parishes or Townships of Broughton Wrexham Regis Bersham Erddig Esclusham Below and Rhosllanerchrugog in the County of Denbigh and to work the same by Electrical Power to sell their Undertaking to the Drake and Gorham Electric Power and Traction Company Limited and for other purposes.	
Electric Lighting Order Confirmation (No. 20) Act 1899	62 & 63 Vict. c. cclxxv	9 August 1899
An Act to confirm a Provisional Order made by the Board of Trade under the Electric Lighting Acts 1882 and 1888 relating to the City of London.
	City of London Electric Lighting Order 1899 Provisional Order granted by the Board of Trade under the Electric Lighting Acts 1882 and 1888 to the Charing Cross and Strand Electricity Supply Corporation Limited in respect of the City of London.	
Education Department Provisional Order Confirmation (London) Act 1899	62 & 63 Vict. c. cclxxvi	9 August 1899
An Act to confirm a Provisional Order made by the Education Department under the Elementary Education Acts 1870 to 1893 to enable the School Board for London to put in force the Lands Clauses Acts.
	London School Board Order 1899 Provisional Order for putting in force the Lands Clauses Acts.	
Tancred's Charities Scheme Confirmation Act 1899 (repealed)	62 & 63 Vict. c. cclxxvii	9 August 1899
An Act to confirm a Scheme of the Charity Commissioners for the management of the several Charities founded by the Settlement and Will of Christopher Tancred of Whixley in the County of York Esquire deceased. (Repealed by Statute Law (Repeals) Act 1981 (c. 19))
	Scheme for the Management of Tancred's Charities.	

=== Private acts ===
Short title	Citation	Royal assent
Long title
Yorke Estate Act 1899	62 & 63 Vict. c. 1 Pr.	13 July 1899
An Act to give effect to a compromise of opposing claims affecting certain estates of the late Sir James Cockbum 7th Baronet deceased situate in the Counties of Pembroke Cardigan and Carmarthen and in the City and County of London.
Cathcart's Divorce Act 1899 (Note: This act was not printed by the Queen's Printer.)	62 & 63 Vict. c. 2 Pr.	27 April 1899
An Act to dissolve the Marriage of Thomas Charles Duffin Cathcart of Ruperta House Newtownards Road in that part of the City of Belfast which is situate in County Down Medical Practitioner with Emily Jane Cathcart his now wife and to enable him to marry again and for other purposes.
Jones' Divorce Act 1899	62 & 63 Vict. c. 3 Pr.	13 July 1899
An Act to dissolve the Marriage of Charlotte Jane Jones the wife of Robert Colvill Jones with the said Robert Colvill Jones and to enable her to marry again and for other purposes.

=== Sources ===
- The Public General Statutes, Volume 36: 62 & 63 Victoria – 1899. 1899 – via Internet Archive.

== 62 & 63 Vict. Sess. 2 ==
The sixth session of the 26th Parliament of the United Kingdom, which met from 17 October 1899 until 27 October 1899.

No local or private acts were passed during this session.

=== Public general acts ===
Short title	Citation	Royal assent
Long title
Appropriation Act 1899, Session 2 (repealed)	63 Vict. Sess. 2. c. 1	27 October 1899
An Act to apply a sum out of the Consolidated Fund to the service of the year ending on the thirty-first day of March one thousand nine hundred, and to appropriate the Supplies granted in this Session of Parliament. (Repealed by Statute Law Revision Act 1908 (8 Edw. 7. c. 49))
Treasury Bills Act 1899 (repealed)	63 Vict. Sess. 2. c. 2	27 October 1899
An Act to raise Money by Treasury Bills for the service of the year ending on the thirty-first day of March nineteen hundred. (Repealed by Statute Law Revision Act 1908 (8 Edw. 7. c. 49))
Second Session (Explanation) Act 1899 (repealed)	63 Vict. Sess. 2. c. 3	27 October 1899
An Act to explain References in the Acts of the last Session of Parliament to the next ensuing Session. (Repealed by Statute Law Revision Act 1963 (c. 30))

=== Sources ===
- The Public General Statutes, Volume 37: 63 Victoria – 1899. 1899 – via Internet Archive.

== See also ==
- List of acts of the Parliament of the United Kingdom
