= John Gwyn (philanthropist) =

John Gwyn (Muff, Co. Donegal 1755 – 1829 Derry) was a linen merchant and philanthropist. On his death he left a substantial bequest to establish a charity for the benefit of boys from poor families in and around Derry, which was duly set up in 1840 under the name of Gwyn's Institution.

== Biography ==
John Gwyn was born in the village of Drumskellan, near Muff in County Donegal, a few miles from Derry. The date of his birth is unknown; his tombstone records that he died on 1 August 1829 "in his seventy-fourth year", implying that he was born in 1755 or 1756. His father William Gwyn was a tenant farmer. His mother's Christian name was Margaret; no record of her maiden surname is extant. William Gwyn died on 26 September 1766 "in the thirty-sixth year of his age"; at the time of John's birth William's age would therefore have been about twenty-five, and when William died John was a mere eleven years old. He was apparently the only surviving child; five siblings of his were buried in infancy next to the graves of their parents in Muff churchyard.

After William's death Margaret married a man called Andrew McElwaine who had a shop in Bishop Street, Lot 26, in the centre of Derry. John was unkindly used by his stepfather; he was made to work hard at menial tasks and his education was neglected.

A few years later McElwaine died, leaving Margaret a widow once more. Using fifty pounds of capital she opened a grocery shop at the premises which McElwaine had owned, with John as her business partner. They worked hard and the business prospered. In due course John moved into the linen trade and made his fortune as a linen merchant.

Gwyn was noted for his thrift and his philanthropy. Frugality was a habit with him, and he persisted with it even after becoming extremely wealthy. According to a clergyman who knew him he counted every penny, always drove a hard bargain and went out of his way to avoid even the smallest unnecessary expense.,

Gwyn (with the spelling 'John Gwynne') was recorded as the owner or occupier of the premises in Bishop Street (Lot 26) in surveys of the city dated 1824 and 1826.

Gwyn never married. He died on 1 August 1829 and was buried next to his parents in Muff churchyard. He bequeathed the bulk of his considerable fortune to establish a charitable trust for the benefit of poor boys.

== Gwyn's Institution ==
Gwyn had experienced the pain of losing his father while still a child, and of being shabbily treated by a stepfather, and this had evidently instilled in him a strong desire to help others who found themselves in a similar situation. It is on record that he "never rejected the immediate claims of the poor" but at the same time was determined to accumulate enough money to finance a major project for the relief of orphans and other deprived children.

His intentions were formally set out in the will which he drew up in 1818. The bulk of his fortune would be used to "feed, clothe and educate" as many as possible of the "male children of the poor or lowest class of society resident in and belonging to the city of Londonderry," preference being given to orphans.

Gwyn had been born into a Church of Ireland family but in adulthood had become a member of the Presbyterian Church. In his will he stipulated that boys of all religious denominations should be assisted, and that while in care they should be allowed to attend appropriate services of worship. This was to apply not only to Protestant children but also to Roman Catholic ones.

In accordance with a codicil to his will the capital sum he had bequeathed for the poor boys was held in trust until it had grown to £50,000. Then ten acres of land were purchased, a park was laid out and a handsome school building in classical style was erected in it, the whole project costing a little under £10,000. The site was on the east slope of Creggan Hill and commanded a grand view of the old city and the countryside beyond. In 1832 the trustees had set up a residential school called "Gwyn's Charitable Institution" in temporary rented premises; in 1840 the school moved to the new building where it was renamed "Gwyn's Institution".

Soon after the opening of Gwyn's Institution Joseph Young, a Derry merchant, bequeathed a large sum for the purpose of clothing, maintaining and educating female children belonging to the City and Liberties of Londonderry. The Educational Endowments Commissioners then arranged to amalgamate this charity with Gwyn's one, the two Trusts being now managed by a body corporate known as the Governors of the Gwyn and Young Endowments, Londonderry.

== Later History of the School Site ==
Gwyn's Institution closed after about fifty years. The estate was then purchased by the Brooke Trust. The park which until then had been known as Gwyn's Grounds became Brooke Park, while the school building started to be used for sundry purposes. At different times it housed the city museum, the municipal library and the offices of the education department. In 1973, during the Troubles, the building was fire bombed and reduced to a shell; its remains were demolished in the early 1990s.

Recognizing the symbolic significance of Gwyn's non-sectarian charity Derry City Council in 2016 restored Gwyn's Grounds and erected a new Gwyn Pavilion for the use of the entire community of the city.

== Tomb of John Gwyn ==
The marble memorial stone erected by the trustees of Gwyn's Institution in 1853 bears the following inscription:

This stone marks the grave of John Gwyn who died in Londonderry on the 1st August, 1829 in the 74th year of his age. He was a native of Muff, but the greater part of his life was spent in mercantile pursuits in the City of Londonderry. Ever kind and benevolent, the gifts of his charity were numerous, but dispensed without ostentation. The moral training of the young was an object that he esteemed to be all important; and his last will proved the sincerity of his desire to promote their welfare, the greater part of his property, all of which had been amassed by his own industry was bequeathed for the establishment and permanent support of a school where orphans boys of all denominations are boarded, educated and apprenticed. The school was opened in 1832. It affords an asylum to the destitute and neglected, and is training its pupils to become respectable tradesmen and useful members of society. GWYN’S INSTITUTION is the best monument of its benevolent founder; as long as it stands to diffuse the light of education his name will be honoured and his memory blessed. The blessing of him that was ready to perish came upon him and he caused the widow’s heart to sing for joy – JOB XXIX : 13
