= Brooke Park =

Public Park in Northern Ireland

Coordinates: 55°00′05″N 7°19′50″W

Brooke Park is a 3.88 acre (1.57 ha) Victorian park in the centre of Derry, Northern Ireland. The park contains many amenities, including a café, children's playground and football pitch, as well as a statue of Sir Robert Ferguson. After a period of decline and disrepair, the park was part of a £5.6 million restoration project and reopened in 2017.

== History ==
Brooke's Park (Londonderry) Act 1899
- Act of Parliament
- Parliament of the United Kingdom
- Long title: An Act for conferring powers upon the Trustees of the Will of the late James Hood Brooke to acquire Gwyns Grounds Londonderry and lay out the same as a public park and for other purposes.
- Citation: 62 & 63 Vict. c. clxxiv

Dates
- Royal assent: 1 August 1899

The history of the park dates back to the opening of the Gwyn's Institute, an orphanage, in 1840. The institute was made possible by John Gwyn, a local linen merchant, who bequeathed £40,000 (over £4.5 million in 2021) in his will to the establishment of an orphanage. The grounds of the orphanage included formal grass terraces, a pond, rose garden, shrubberies and boundary planting, a kitchen garden and orchards.

By the end of the 19th century most of the children cared for at the orphanage were in boarding schools and so the institute closed. At that point the grounds were acquired to fulfil another philanthropist's will. James Hood Brooke died in 1865, and in his will bequeathed £9,100 (over £1 million in 2021) to the establishment of a park that would be maintained in perpetuity for the citizens of Derry. When his sister died in 1897 the trustees of his will moved to establish Brooke Park. With some funding from the Irish Society, Brooke Park was opened in 1901.

The park became a well-loved portion of the city centre and acquired the nickname ‘the people’s park’ as a result. The park was the site of several royal visits. In 1903 King Edward VII visited the park along with his wife, Queen Alexandria, and took part in a tree planting ceremony. In 1945 King George VI also paid a visit to the park and planted trees using the same shovel that his grandfather had used in 1903. In 1953 the newly crowned Queen Elizabeth II also visited the park.

Following the onset of the Troubles in the late 1960s the park entered a period of decline. The army moved in and the park was largely closed to the public and the Gwyn building was the frequent target of the IRA. Eventually the building was gutted as a result of firebombing in 1973 and eventually demolished in 1986.

After 2000 the council began working on regenerating the park. This resulted in several phases of regeneration with funding coming from a number of benefactors, including the Heritage Lottery Fund.
