= Lucy Gwynn =

First woman to be appointed as a registrar to Trinity College Dublin (1865-1947)

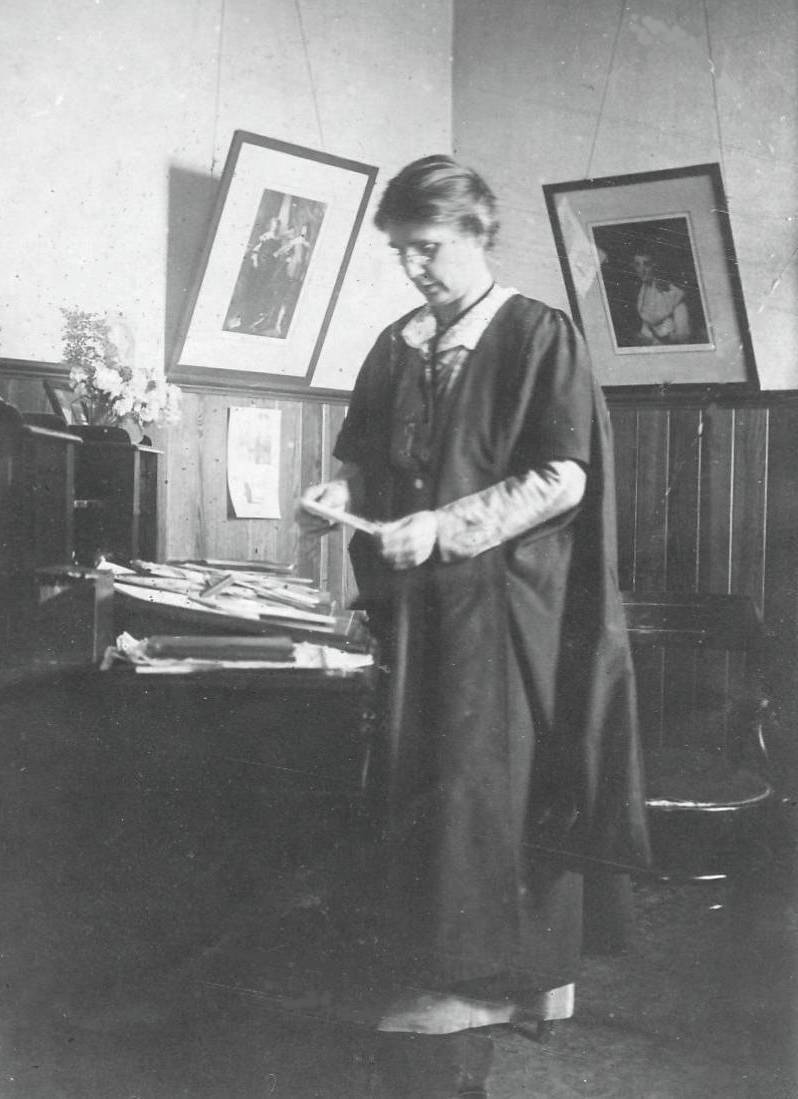
- Lucy Gwynn at Trinity College Dublin, c.1912
- Born: 22 September 1865; County Donegal, Ireland
- Died: 1947; County Clare, Ireland

Lucy Penelope Gwynn (1865-1947) was the first woman registrar of Trinity College Dublin.

== Biography ==
Lucy Gwynn was born in County Donegal in Ireland. Her father John Gwynn was a Syriacist and Regius Professor of Divinity at Trinity College Dublin. Her mother was Lucy O'Brien, daughter of MP William Smith O'Brien. Her eight brothers included the author and politician Stephen Gwynn, the academic Edward Gwynn, the career soldier Major General Sir Charles Gwynn, the cricketers Lucius Gwynn and Arthur Gwynn, the academic cleric and social reformer Robin Gwynn, the Indian civil servant and journalist Jack Gwynn and the Irish civil servant Brian Gwynn. She had one sister, Mary Gwynn, the wife of Henry Bowen and stepmother of the writer Elizabeth Bowen. She was a greatniece of Harriet Monsell (1812-1883).

Lucy Gwynn was appointed first lady registrar of Trinity College Dublin in February 1905. Trinity College had finally admitted women to the university just the year before, in 1904. Despite coming from a family of academics Lucy Gwynn had been unable to get a university education herself. She was 39 years old when appointed to her position in the university.

Students described Lucy Gwynn as a pioneer. Her role as women's registrar was described by one of her charges as "to control our movements to some extent and to protect the college and the students from criticism".

In 1907 Lucy Gwynn was summoned before the Fry Commission on Dublin University to defend the position of women at Trinity. She was supported by the parents of the students. The result was that the commission endorsed the principle of women's admission to the university.

In 1922, the Dublin University Women Graduates’ Association was founded, under Lucy Gwynn's presidency.

Lucy Gwynn never married. As an eldest daughter she was required to assist in the management of her parents' household and attend to them in their old age. From her mother's brother Robert Donough O'Brien (1844-1917), an architect, she inherited the house he had designed and built at Parteen-a-Lax in County Clare, close to Limerick City. It was there that she retired at the end of her working life. Her hobby was tending its beautiful garden which lay next to the river Shannon.

== Notable events ==
- 1905 First large group of women students entered Trinity College Dublin in the Michaelmas Term.
- 1905 Lady Registrar appointed. Rules and Regulations for Women introduced. Women had to leave the college before 6pm, had to wear 'cap and gown' and could not visit private rooms unless accompanied by a chaperon.
- 1905 Elizabethan Society for Women founded; it organized a common room, debates, sports and lunch-room.

== Lucy Gwynn Memorial Prize ==
Founded, by subscription, in 1948 in memory of Lucy Gwynn it is awarded annually in the Michaelmas term to a Junior Sophister woman student for distinction in her course. The award is made by two women on the university staff nominated by the Board, and one of the female tutors. The value of the prize is €1,207.

== Photographs ==
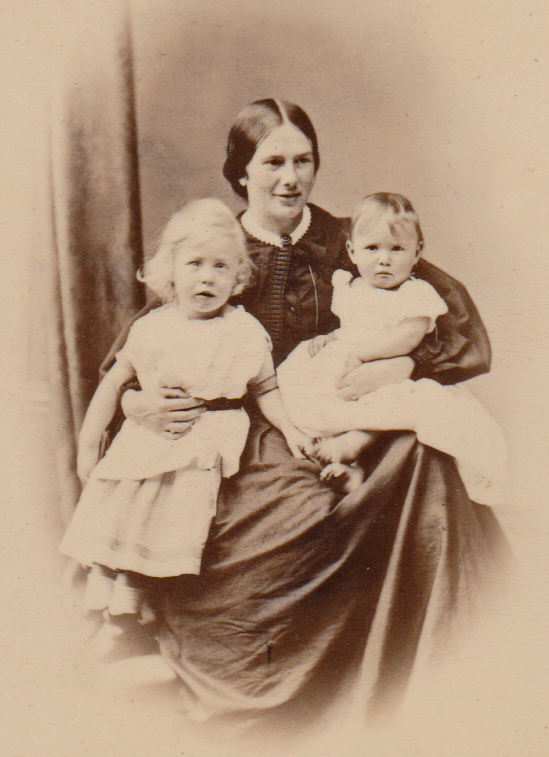
Lucy Gwynn as a child, with her mother Lucy Josephine and her elder brother Stephen Lucius, 1866

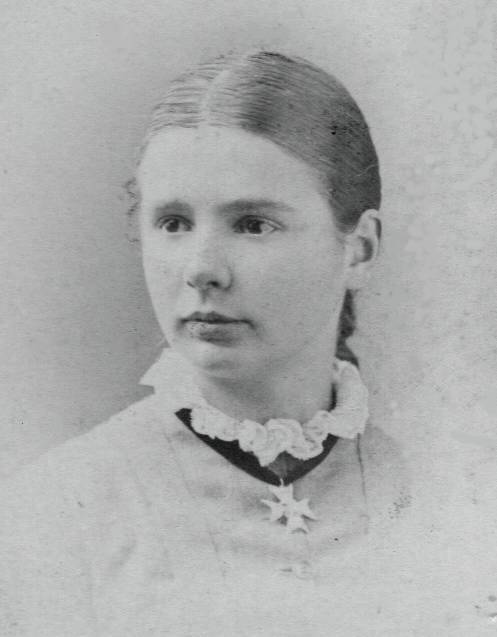
Lucy Gwynn as a young woman, c.1875

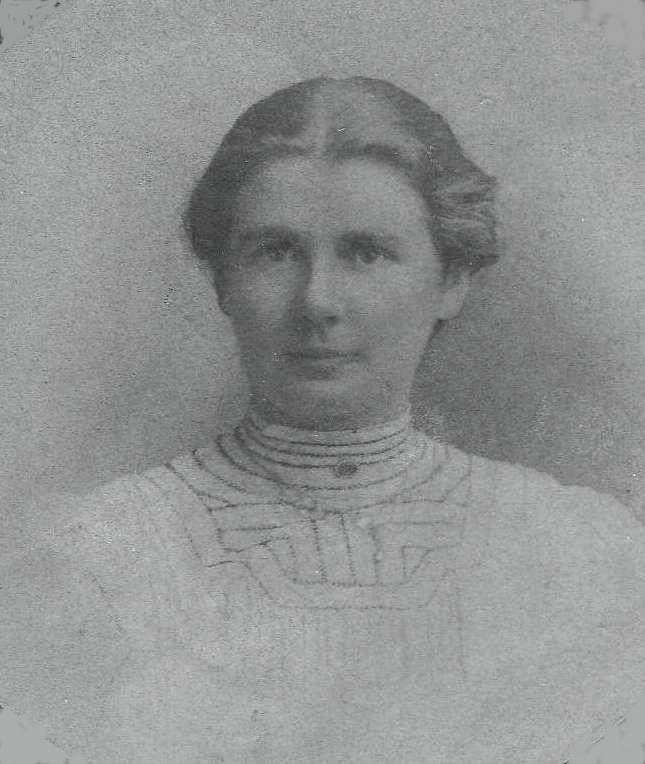
Lucy Gwynn in her twenties, c.1880

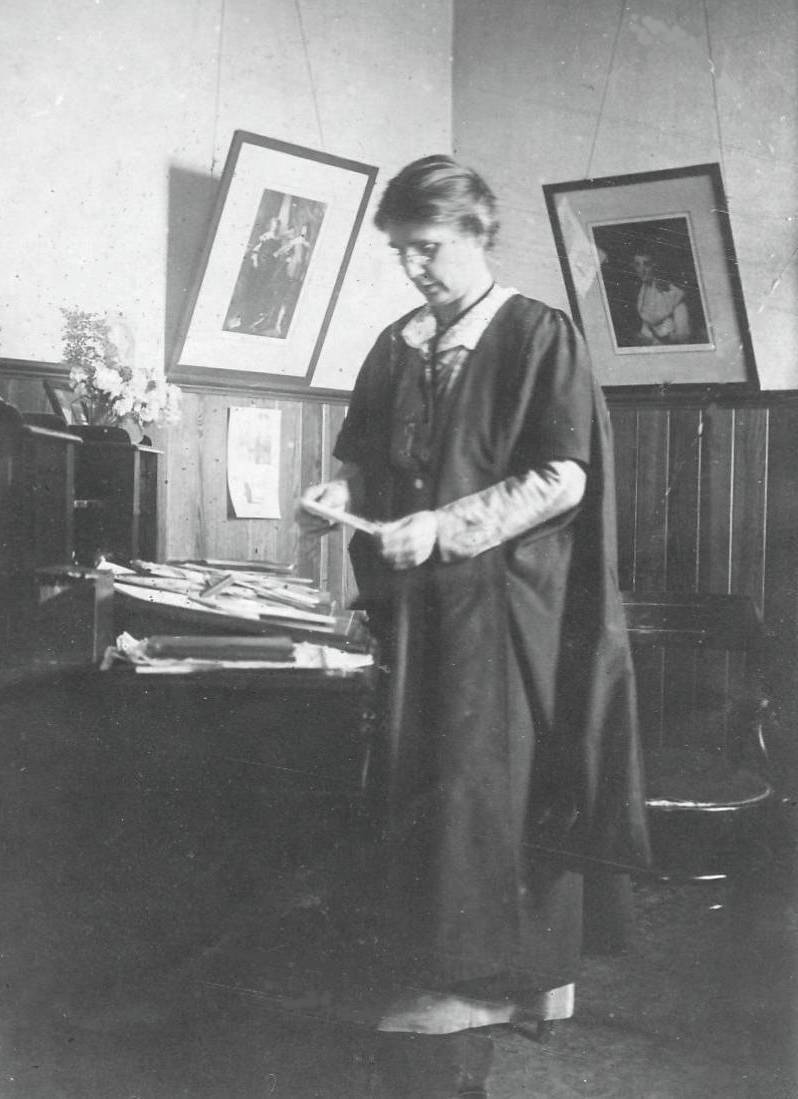
Lucy Gwynn as Lady Registrar, c.1912

Miss Lucy Gwynn, Miss Margery Cunningham and students, 1910

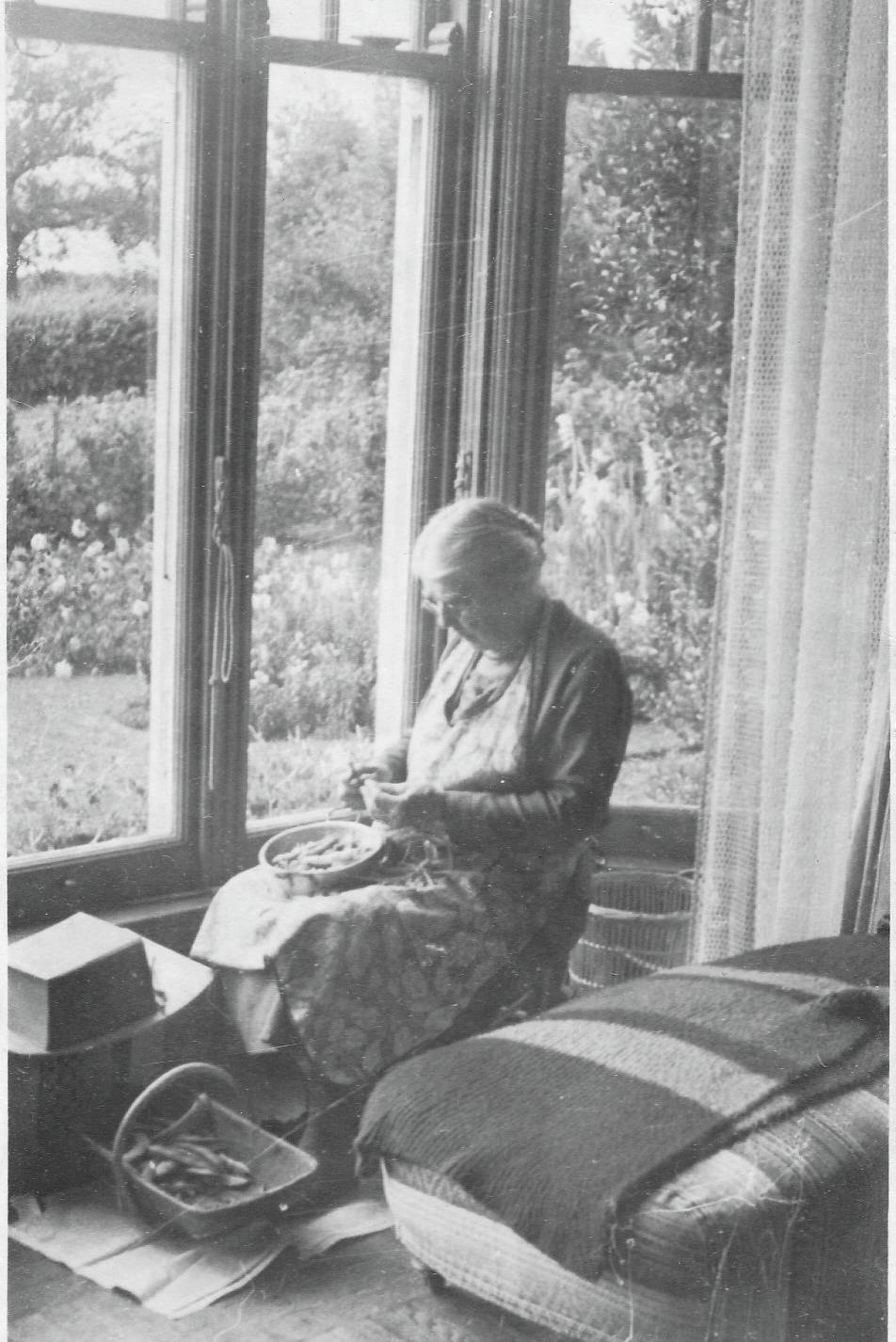
Lucy Gwynn at Parteen-a-Lax, c.1939

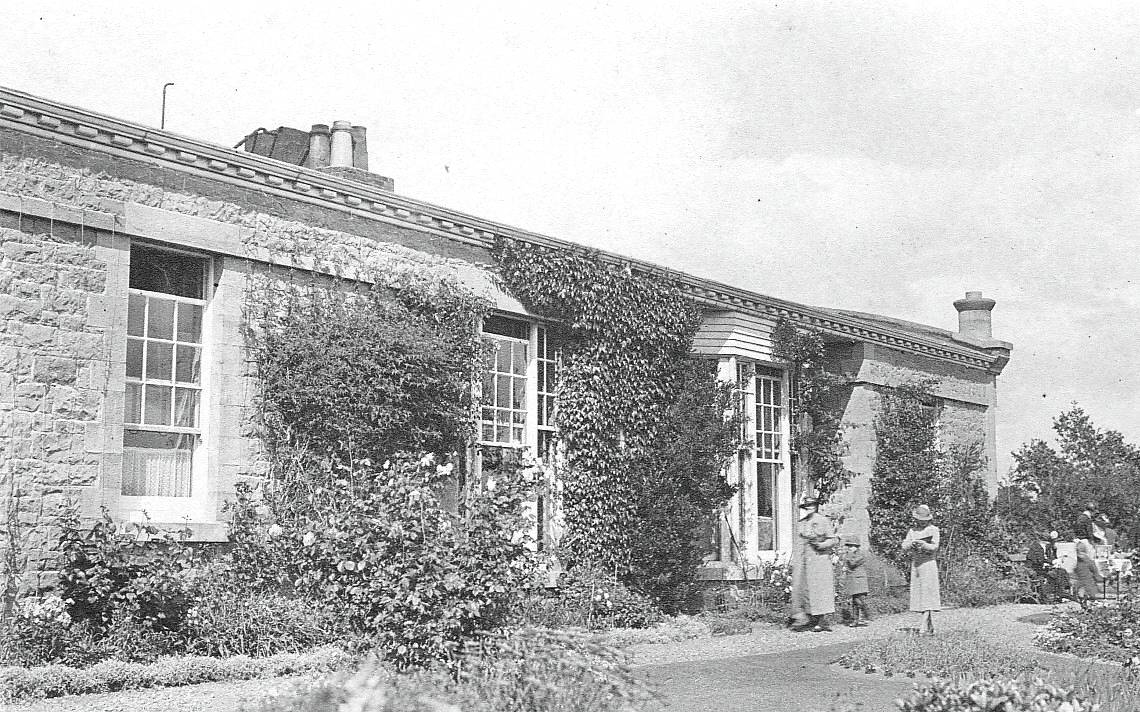
Lucy Gwynn's home Parteen-a-Lax, near Limerick

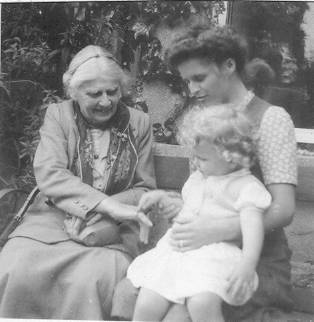
Lucy Gwynn as an old woman, with niece-in-law Dorothy and great-niece Lucy Gwynn, 1947
