= John David Gwynn =

Irish cricketer and civil engineer (1907–1998)

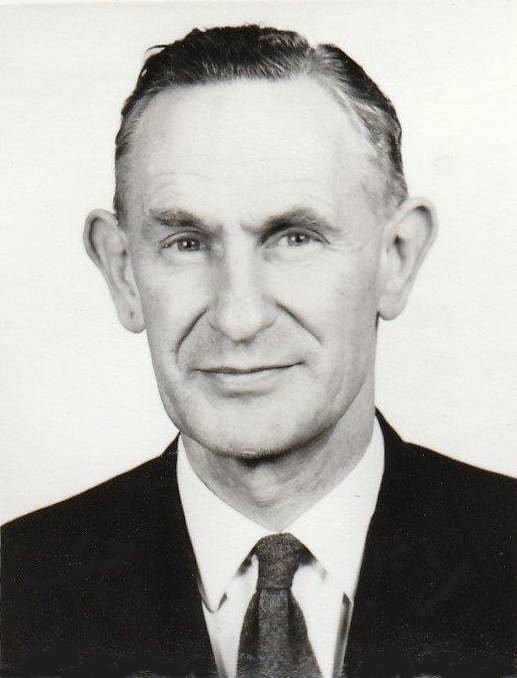

Personal information
- Full name: John David Gwynn
- Born: 13 July 1907; Clontarf, Ireland
- Died: 21 November 1998 (aged 91); Wandsworth, London, England
- Batting: Right-handed
- Relatives: John Gwynn (uncle); Lucius Gwynn (uncle); Arthur Gwynn (uncle); Robert Gwynn (uncle)

Domestic team information
- Years: Team
- 1926: Dublin University

Career statistics
Competition	First-class
Matches	1
Runs scored	11
Batting average	11.00
100s/50s	–/–
Top score	11*
Catches/stumpings	–/–
- Source: Cricinfo, 2 January 2022

John David Gwynn (13 July 1907 – 21 November 1998) was a civil engineer with a special interest in renewable energy generation. In his youth he was one of Ireland's most distinguished cricketers.

John David Gwynn (known to family and friends as "David" or "JD") was born in Dublin on 13 July 1907. He was the eldest child of Edward Gwynn, an academic and sometime Provost of Trinity College Dublin, and Olive Mary Gwynn née Ponsonby. In accordance with family tradition he was educated at St Columba's College, Dublin and then at Trinity College Dublin, where he studied civil engineering. While still an undergraduate he was employed by the Siemens company to assist in their work on the Shannon hydroelectric scheme.

Gwynn went on to become a chartered civil engineer, a Fellow of the Institution of Civil Engineers and a Member of the Institute of Mechanical Engineers. After graduating BAI in 1930 he worked on Newport Bridge in Middlesbrough as an employee of the company Mott, Hay and Anderson. In 1936 he joined Balfour Beatty and was engaged on the extension of the Piccadilly Line for London Transport.

In the early 1940s J. D. Gwynn was again involved in developing hydro-electric power infrastructure, this time in Scotland. As the second World War continued he was put in charge of building the Churchill Barriers in Scapa Flow, Orkney, a task which occupied him from 1942 to 1944.

After the war he supervised further hydro-electric schemes both in the UK and overseas. Among other assignments he was chief engineer for the Kainji Dam Project in Nigeria. He became a director of Balfour Beatty in 1963, and a director of Engineering Power and Development Consultants in 1967. In 1966 an honorary MAI degree was conferred upon him by Trinity College, Dublin.

After his retirement from Balfour Beatty David Gwynn turned to the field of renewable energy, where with characteristic vigour and enthusiasm he proceeded to undertake research and develop innovative experimental designs. With his team he mounted trial schemes for various small scale stream-driven turbines as well as much larger tidal power devices, and he continued this voluntary work right up to the end of his life.

J D Gwynn married twice. His first wife, Grace Lee, was a historian; she died in 1964. They had two children: Lee Penelope, a teacher and local government politician, and Robin David, an academic historian and philatelist. J D Gwynn later married Esther Hulbert, a musicologist and singer, who also predeceased him. He died at the age of 91 on 21 November 1998.

== Cricketing career ==
A right-handed batsman, he played one first-class match for Dublin University against Northamptonshire in July 1926, a match that also featured the Irish playwright Samuel Beckett.

Gwynn came from a cricketing family. Three of his uncles (Arthur, Lucius and Robin) all represented Ireland, whilst a fourth uncle, Jack, played first-class cricket in India.
