= Manresa House, Dublin =

Jesuit retreat house, Clontarf, Dublin, Ireland

Coordinates: 53.366805°N 6.178265°W

Manresa House
- Baymount Castle
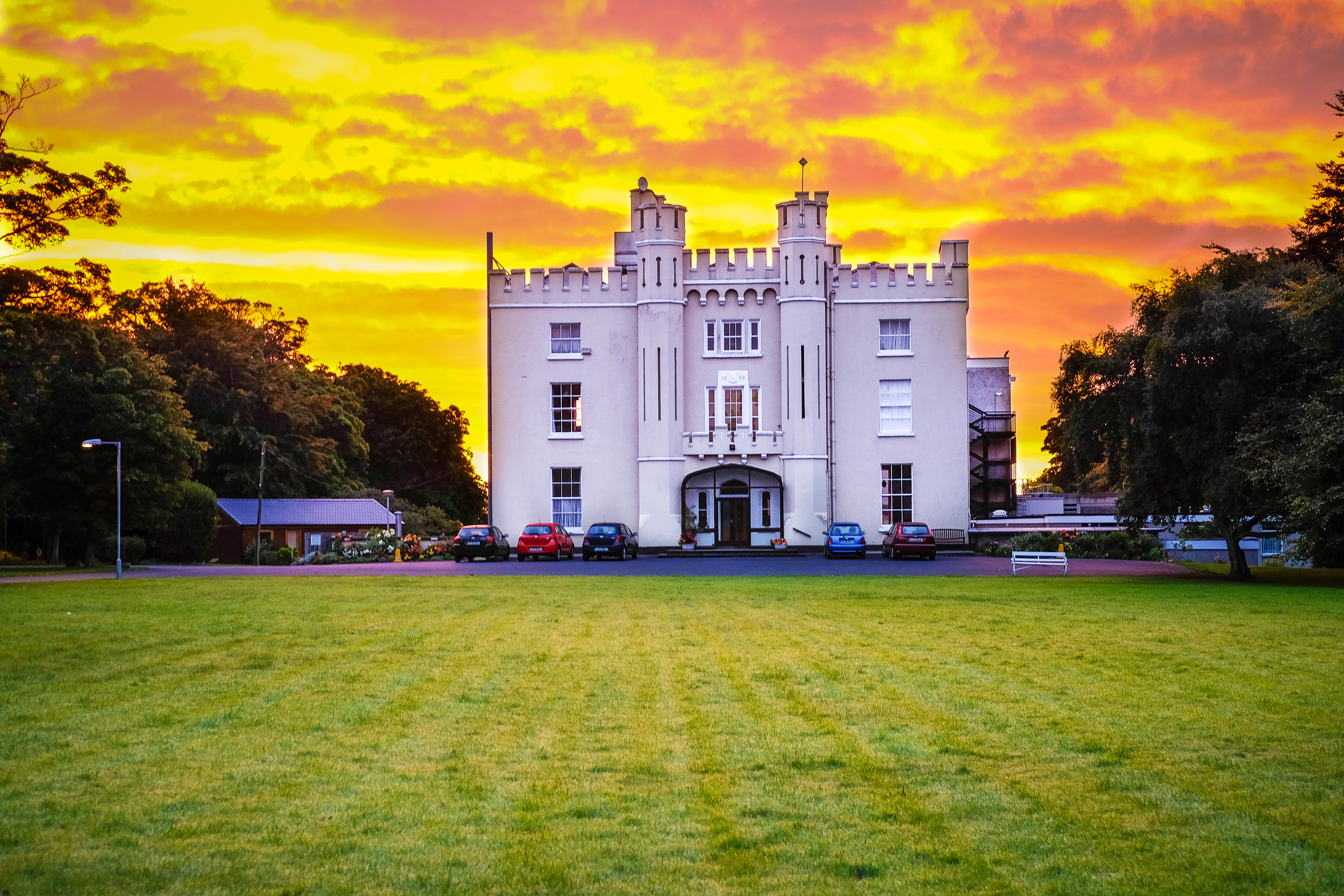
- The house at sunset

- Location in Ireland
- Location: Dollymount, Clontarf
- Country: Ireland
- Denomination: Roman Catholic
- Website: Manresa.ie

History
- Former name(s): Granby Hall; Baymount Castle
- Status: Active
- Founded: 1949

Architecture
- Functional status: Retreat centre
- Heritage designation: Protected Structure

Administration
- Province: Dublin
- Archdiocese: Dublin
- Deanery: Fingal South East

Manresa House is a retreat centre run by the Society of Jesus in the Dollymount area of Clontarf in Dublin, near Saint Anne's Park. In the 19th century it was home to Robert Warren and Arthur Guinness, and it is a protected structure.

== History ==
=== Origins ===
Manresa House is a large house originally constructed in the mid 18th century. It was originally known as Granby Hall, and then Baymount Castle and included 17 acres of land surrounding the house.

From 1775 to 1783, it was a residence of the Bishop of Down and Connor, James Traill.

The house was used briefly as a school named Baymount House School from 1834 to 1838.

In 1838, it was leased from J.E.V. Vernon by Robert Warren who largely remodelled the house in a Gothic revival castellated style, possibly by the architect George Papworth. New outbuildings and gate lodges were also constructed at this time.

In 1845 it became the property of the Sisters of Loreto who opened a school there from 1847. In 1851, it was renovated by the sisters, because the building was damaged by a serious fire that year and they ultimately moved to Balbriggan in the years following.

In the later 19th century the house was owned by George Tickell, a property developer.

In 1898, it was sold to Arthur Guinness, Baron Ardilaun.

=== Baymount School ===
In around 1904 William Scott opened a school on the premises called Baymount Preparatory School, of which he was headmaster until 1936.

The school was then later acquired by John Tudor Gwynn, who ran it until 1948 when the school closed. John T Gwynn was a descendant of John Gwynn and a member of the Gwynn family that included noted literary figures such as Stephen Gwynn and Edward Gwynn.

=== Establishment of Spirituality Centre ===
In 1948, the Archbishop of Dublin, John Charles McQuaid asked the Jesuits to establish a spirituality centre in the Dollymount area, so they bought Baymount Castle. They renamed it Manresa House after Manresa in Catalonia, Spain, where St Ignatius of Loyola, the founder of the Jesuits had many spiritual experiences that contributed to formulation of his Spiritual Exercises.

== The Retreat Centre ==
The first retreat was held there in 1949. In 1966, a new building designed by Andrew Devane was added to accommodate more retreatants and was opened in 1967. Building and renovation work was undertaken in 2022 to provide a new dining and reception area, to renovate accommodation and to refurbish the castle structure.

== Irish Jesuit Novitiate 1969–1991 ==
The Irish Jesuit Novitiate was moved from Emo Court in County Laois in 1969 to a building in the grounds of Manresa House. In 1977, part of the property near the novitiate, was sold and the Park Lawn estate built. The novitiate moved to Santry in 1991 before the establishment of the joint British-Irish Novitiate in Birmingham, later to also become the novitiate for other Jesuit Provinces.

== Jesuit European Tertianship ==
The European English-speaking Jesuit European Tertianship was located in Manresa from 2006 until 2021. Tertianship is the third period of formation of a Jesuit, before taking final vows with the order. In 2006, renovation and new building was undertaken to provide for the Tertianship, using the site of the old novitiate for the Tertianship of the Jesuits in Europe. To allow for the reorganisation of the retreat ministry, this building rehoused the Jesuit Community when it moved out of the castle in 2023.

== Interior ==
The centre offers a variety of directed retreats, seminars, and various day and evening events, as well as the 30-day retreat, from the Spiritual Exercises.

In the oval meditation room are a set of windows designed by Evie Hone. They were installed in the 1990s. The windows were originally in the former Jesuit school St Stanislaus College, Tullabeg, County Offaly.

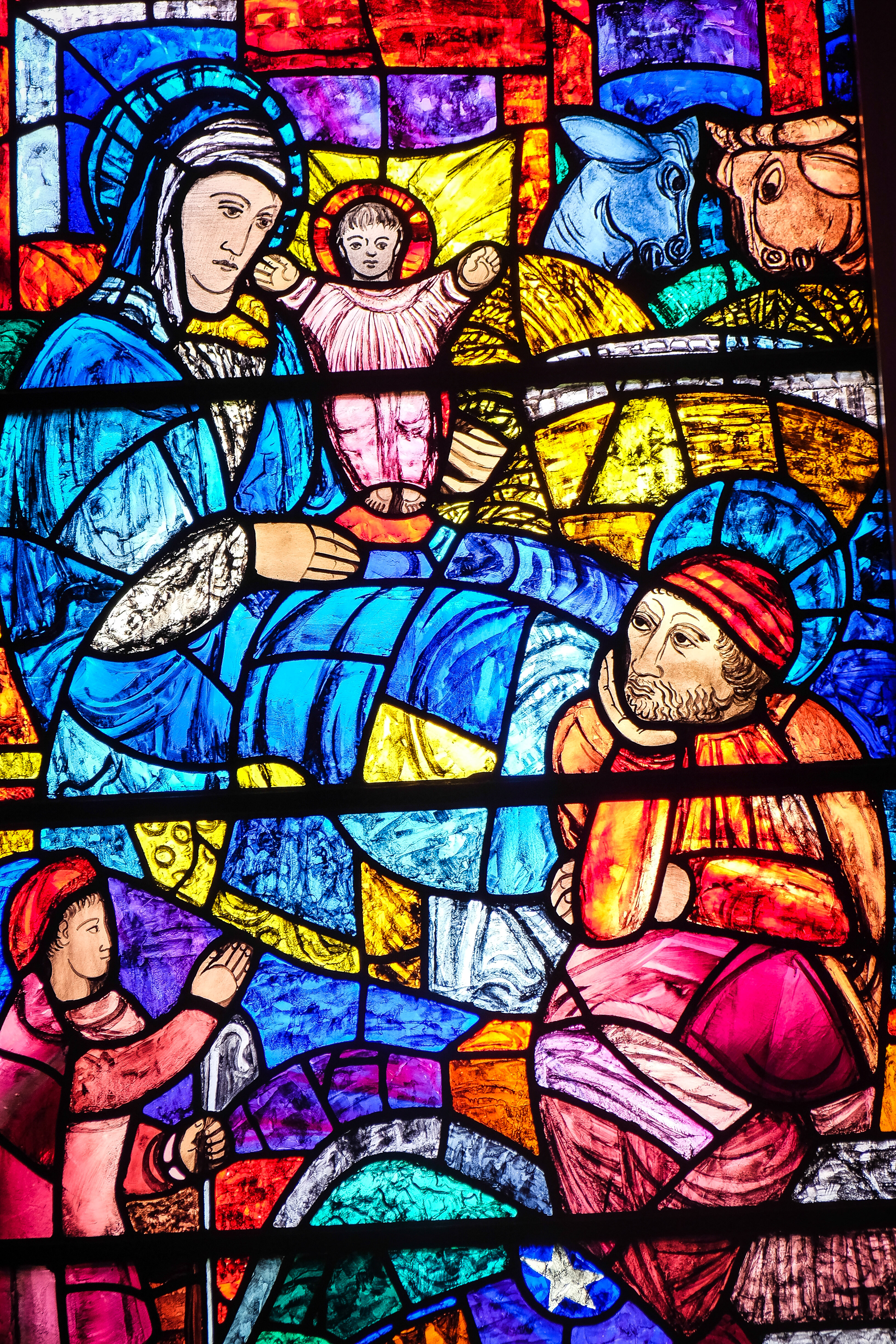
Window depicting the Nativity

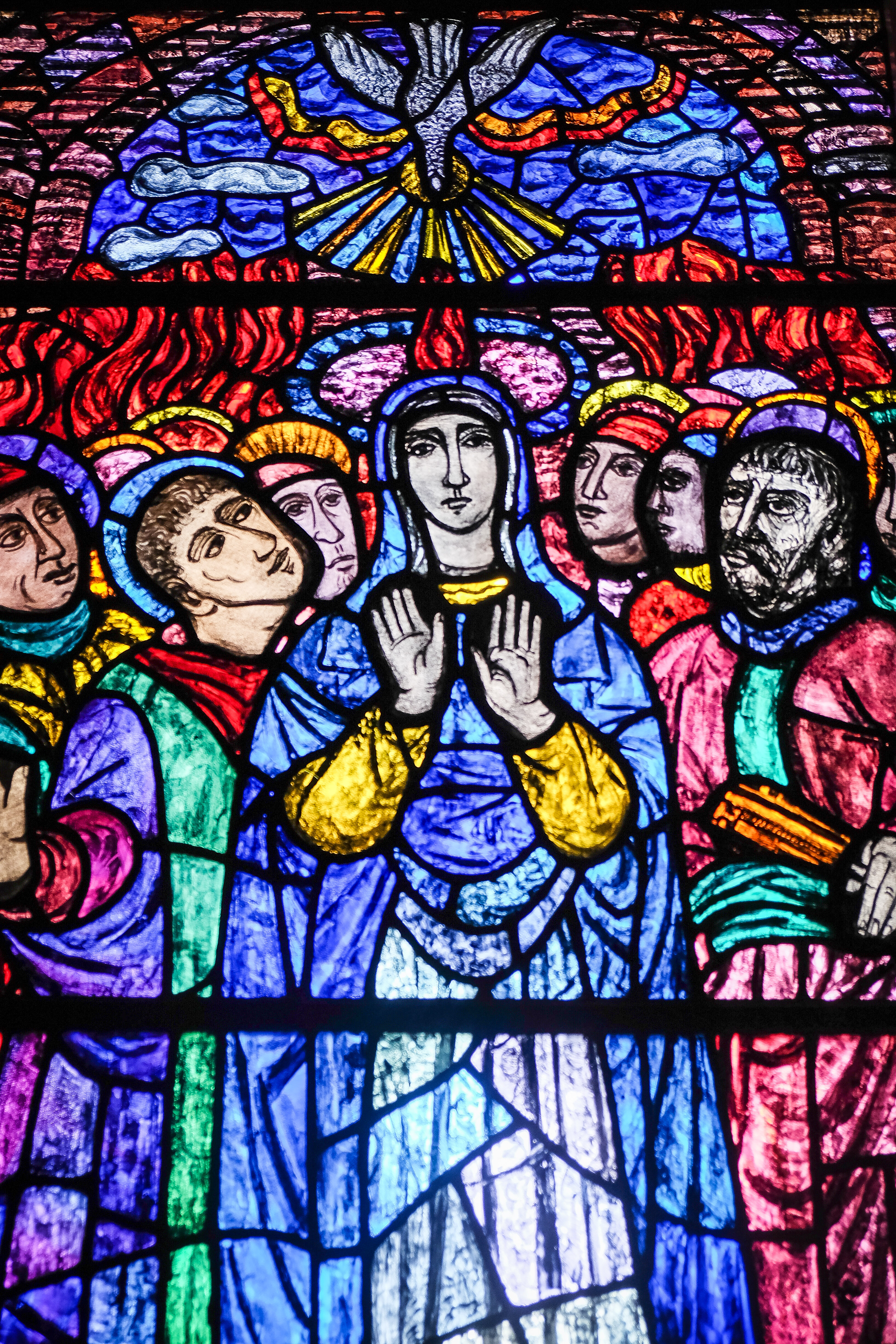
Window depicting Pentecost

== Courses ==
Manresa House runs a two-year Diploma in Spirituality (Spiritual Direction) accredited by St Patrick's College, Maynooth (Pontifical University), which has been offered in centres in Galway and Larne. Training in supervision for spiritual directors is also offered, and those who successfully complete the course are awarded an Advanced Diploma in Spirituality (Supervision) from Maynooth. Manresa House Spiritual Direction training programmes are conducted in association with the Together in the Mystery supervisor training programme.

== People associated with Manresa House ==
Sean McCarron was the first superior in 1949, the social reformer Michael Sweetman served as Superior of Manresa from 1959 to 1960. Joseph Dargan, Laurence Murphy, Paddy Carberry were among those who served as masters of novices in Manresa. The rôle of Superior has been occupied variously by Dónal Mulcahy, Kieran Hanley (1989–1993), Paul Andrews, Joe Dargan and Mike Drennan. The current Superior of the Jesuit Community is Willie Reynolds SJ.

== See also ==
- Ignatian Spirituality
- List of Jesuit sites in Ireland
