= Arthur Gwynn =

Irish cricketer and rugby union footballer

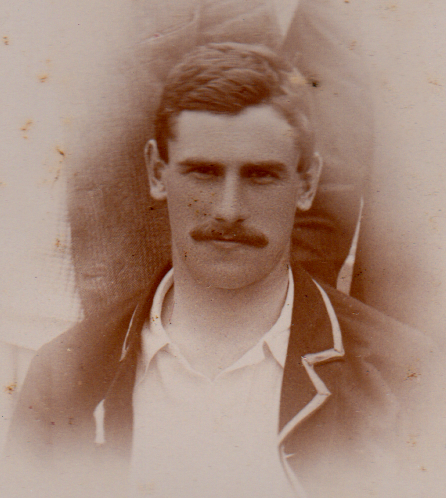

Cricket information
- Batting: Right-handed

International information
- National side: Ireland

Career statistics
Competition	First-class
Matches	4
Runs scored	267
Batting average	33.37
100s/50s	1/1
Top score	130
Catches/stumpings	5/1
- Source: CricketArchive, 15 November 2022

Arthur Percival Gwynn (11 June 1874 – 14 February 1898) was an Irish cricketer and rugby union player.

== Life ==
Arthur Percival Gwynn was born in Ramelton, County Donegal, Ireland, the fifth son of the Very Rev John Gwynn D.D. and Josephine O'Brien. He was educated at St Columba's College, Rathfarnham and Trinity College Dublin. He excelled academically as well as on the sporting field. The most outgoing of the Gwynn brothers at Trinity College, he cut a handsome and dashing figure. He graduated from Trinity College in 1896, taking a double first in his finals. After completing the induction course for the Indian Civil Service in the autumn of 1897 he travelled to Burma for his first tour of duty. Tragically his promising career came to an abrupt end a few months later: in February 1898 he died in Rangoon of septicaemia resulting from a tooth infection.

== Cricket career ==
A right-handed batsman and wicket-keeper, Arthur Gwynn played for the Ireland cricket team five times between 1893 and 1896 and also played four first-class matches for Dublin University in 1895.

He made his debut for Ireland in a match against WH Laverton's XI, scoring one run in the only Irish innings. The following year, he played twice for Ireland, against I Zingari and South Africa. He scored 62 in the second innings against South Africa, his top score for Ireland.

May 1895 saw him make his first-class debut, playing for Dublin University against the MCC on 20 May. This was followed three days later by a match for Ireland against the same opponents. He played three further first-class matches that year, two against Cambridge University and one against Leicestershire. He scored 130 in the final match against Cambridge University, his highest first-class score.

In all matches for Ireland, he scored 220 runs at an average of 36.67. He took six catches and one stumping.

== Rugby Union ==
Arthur Gwynn also played once for the Ireland national rugby union team, in the 1895 Four Nations tournament against Wales.

== Personal life ==
Arthur Gwynn came from a cricketing family. His elder brother Lucius played several times for Ireland, and a younger brother Robin also played for Dublin University and Ireland. A fourth brother Jack after several seasons with the university team went on to play first-class cricket in India. Each of these four brothers had his turn as captain of the Dublin University XI. A cousin Donough O'Brien played for Ireland and the MCC, and a nephew John David Gwynn also played for Dublin University.

== See also ==
- List of Irish cricket and rugby union players
