= Robert Gwynn =

Robert Malcolm Gwynn
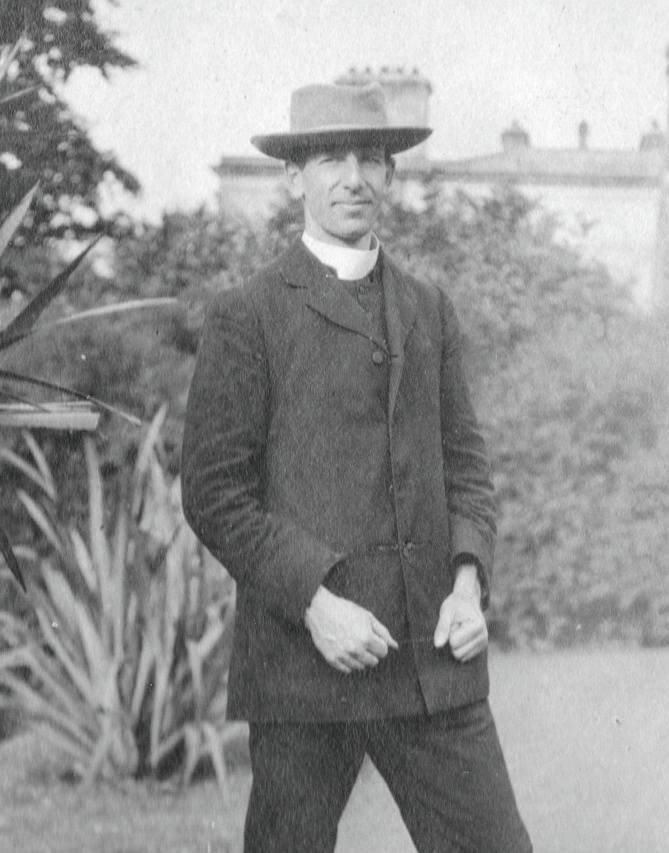
- Gwynn as a young don
- Born: 26 April 1877; Ramelton, Co Donegal
- Died: 25 June 1962 (aged 85); Dublin

Robert Gwynn
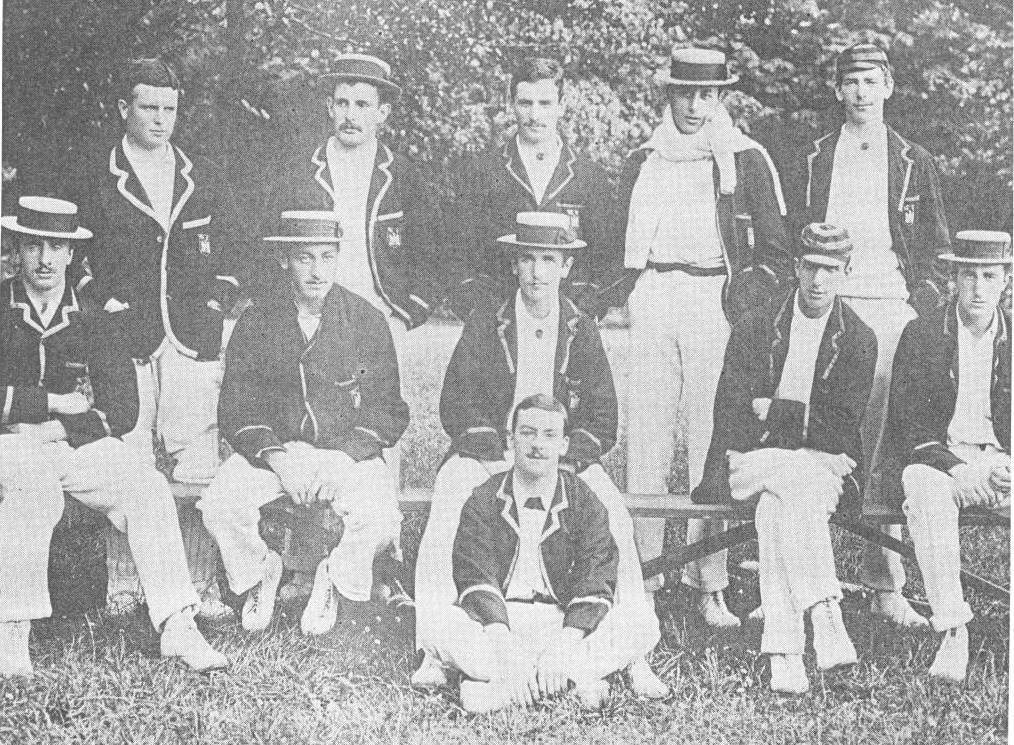
- Dublin University team of 1895 - R M Gwynn is in the back row, far right

Cricket information
- Batting: Right-handed
- Bowling: Right-arm slow

International information
- National side: Ireland

Career statistics
Competition	First-class
Matches	4
Runs scored	52
Batting average	10.40
100s/50s	0/0
Top score	23*
Balls bowled	274
Wickets	8
Bowling average	34.25
5 wickets in innings	0
10 wickets in match	0
Best bowling	3/21
Catches/stumpings	0/–
- Source: CricketArchive, 15 November 2022

Robert Malcolm Gwynn (26 April 1877 – 25 June 1962) was a Church of Ireland clergyman and academic whose entire working life was spent at Trinity College Dublin. In his youth, he was also an outstanding cricketer.

== Life ==
Robert Malcolm Gwynn (generally known to family and friends as "Robin" or "R.M.") was born in Ramelton, County Donegal, on 26 April 1877 while his father, the Reverend John Gwynn, was Dean of Raphoe. He was one of eight brothers and two sisters. Their mother was Lucy Josephine Gwynn, daughter of the Irish patriot William Smith O'Brien.

Robin Gwynn was educated at St Columba's College, Rathfarnham and Trinity College Dublin. In 1896 he headed the list of Foundation Scholars in Classics at Trinity College Dublin. In 1898 he graduated Bachelor of Arts, gaining a "first of firsts" with gold medals in Classics and Modern Literature.

In 1900, along with his brother Edward Gwynn and others, Robin Gwynn founded the Social Services (Tenements) Company to provide housing for poor families in Dublin city. He subsequently spent many periods working with the poor in Dublin's slums. He was instrumental in founding the Trinity Mission, which served slum dwellers in Belfast, and was for many years actively involved in the Dublin University Fukien Mission (later the Dublin University Far Eastern Mission), eventually becoming its chairman and president.

Robin Gwynn was ordained deacon in 1906, achieving full priesthood two years later. He was the only one of Rev John Gwynn's sons to be ordained, and he never served in a parish. That same year, 1906, he proceeded to MA and was elected a Fellow of Trinity College Dublin.

In 1907 he was appointed Lecturer in Divinity and Tutor, graduating Bachelor of Divinity in 1910. He remained Lecturer in Divinity until 1919 and continued as Tutor until 1937. He was appointed Chaplain of TCD in 1911, retaining that post until 1919.

In January 1909 Robin Gwynn was appointed Acting Warden of his old school, Saint Columba's College, which was facing a major financial crisis. He kept the institution afloat until a new Warden was appointed.

Horrified by the brutality of the Dublin Metropolitan Police towards strikers during the lockout in 1913, Robin Gwynn became a prominent advocate of the workers' cause and joined the Industrial Peace Committee. On 12 November 1913, when the committee was barred from holding its meeting at the Mansion House, R.M. invited the members to his college rooms at No 40, New Square. It was this meeting that led to the foundation of the Irish Citizen Army. In their history of Trinity College McDowell and Webb observe: "Gwynn's support for the 'army' concept was based simply on the idea that military-style discipline would keep unemployed men fit and give them self-respect. ’’Sancta simplicitas!’’"

In 1914 Robin Gwynn married Dr Eileen Gertrude Glenn, a rector's daughter from Pomeroy, County Tyrone. They were to have six children.

In 1916 Robin Gwynn was appointed Professor of Biblical Greek, a post he held for forty years (1916-1956). During those four decades, he held a number of other, often overlapping, academic appointments at the university, including Professor of Hebrew (1920-1937), Registrar (1941), Vice-Provost (1941-1943), Senior Lecturer (1944-1950), and Senior Tutor (1950-1956). In 1937 he was co-opted to Senior Fellowship. He was made an honorary fellow in 1958.

When the Dublin University Fabian Society was formed R.M. Gwynn became one of its vice-presidents.

Like several of his brothers, Robin Gwynn was a fine cricket player, in his youth captaining both his school XI and the Dublin University XI. He retained a lifelong interest in the sport, and J V Luce portrays him as President of the Dublin University Cricket Club, with his "tall rangy figure ... a familiar sight at matches in College Park."

Robin Gwynn was tall and athletic, but in later life suffered from deafness. To aid his hearing he used to carry a large ear trumpet with him and this, together with his height and glowing white hair, made him an impressive and instantly recognizable figure round Trinity College. In character, he was patient, kind and wise, but at the same time resolute and tough. His nephew-in-law, the late Archbishop George Simms, remarked that his "gentle humility inspired trust and drew confidences, his stubborn integrity brought surprises for those who mistook charity for easy-going indifference," and spoke of his "athanasian courage."

Robin Gwynn died in Dublin in June 1962, aged 85, and was buried in Whitechurch churchyard.

== Cricketing career ==
A right-handed batsman and right-arm slow bowler, Robin Gwynn played once for the Ireland cricket team in 1901. He also played four first-class matches for Dublin University in 1895.

Gwynn made his first-class debut for Dublin University against the MCC on 20 May 1895. Three days later he played for the MCC against Ireland. He played three further first-class matches for Dublin University in that year, two against Cambridge University and one against Leicestershire. Six years later, he played his only match for Ireland, a two-day match against South Africa in June 1901.

Gwynn once enjoyed the distinction of bowling W. G. Grace for a first ball duck.

Several of Robin Gwynn's close kin were also noted cricketers. His brother John played first-class cricket in India, whilst two further brothers (Lucius and Arthur) also represented Ireland, as did his cousin Donough O'Brien. His nephew John David Gwynn also played for Dublin University.

== Photographs ==
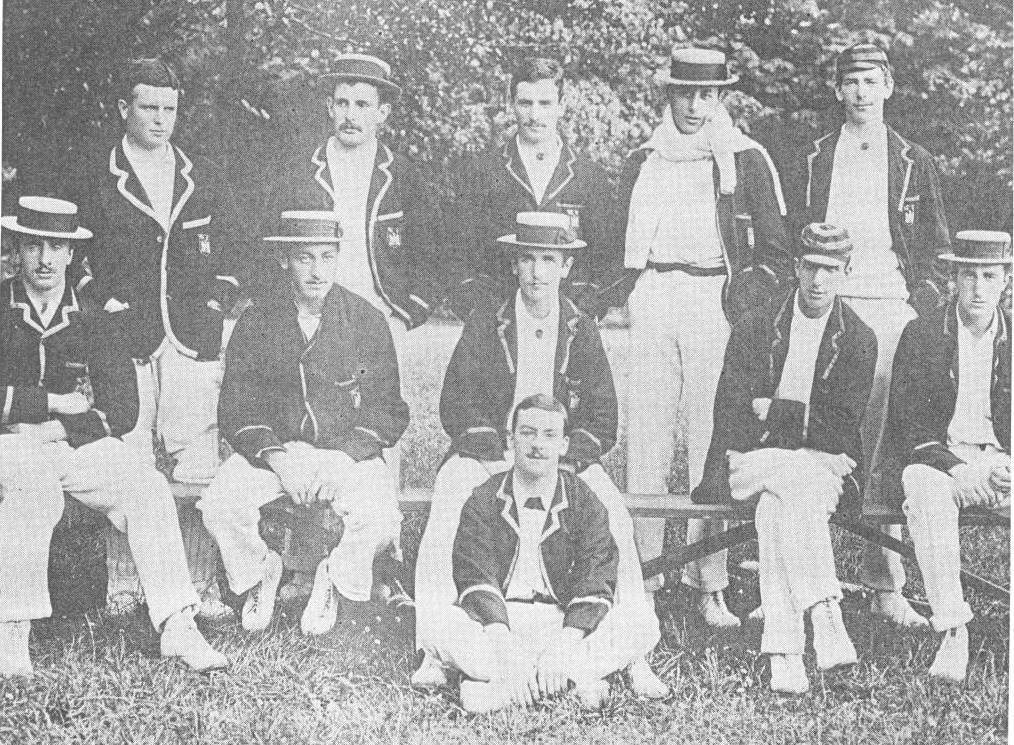
The 1895 team showing Lucius Gwynn (captain, seated centre), Arthur Gwynn (back row centre), Robin Gwynn (back row right)

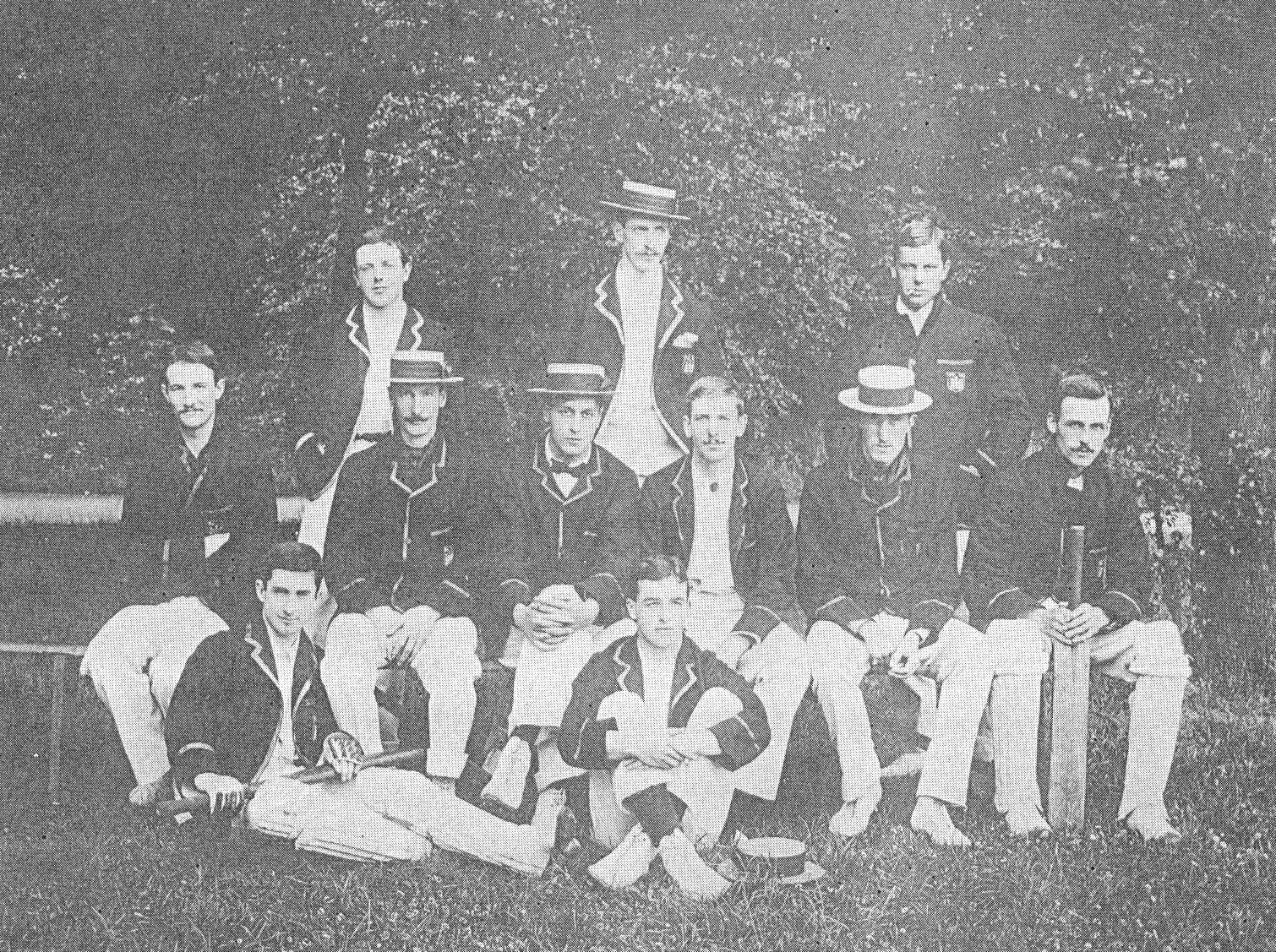
The 1898 team with Robin Gwynn (centre) as captain

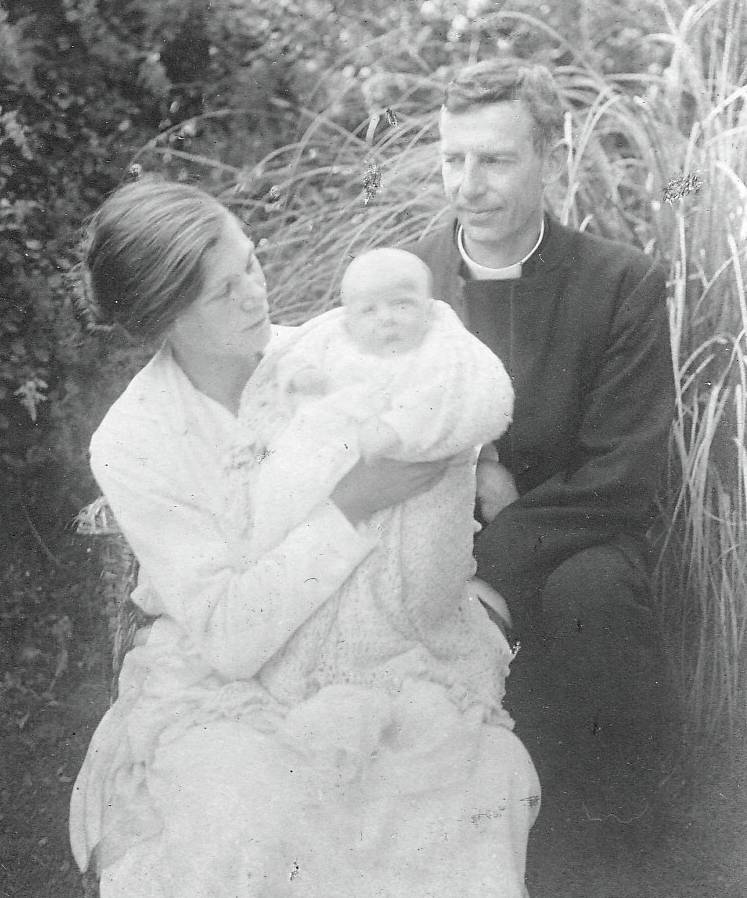
Robin Gwynn with his wife and first child, 1918

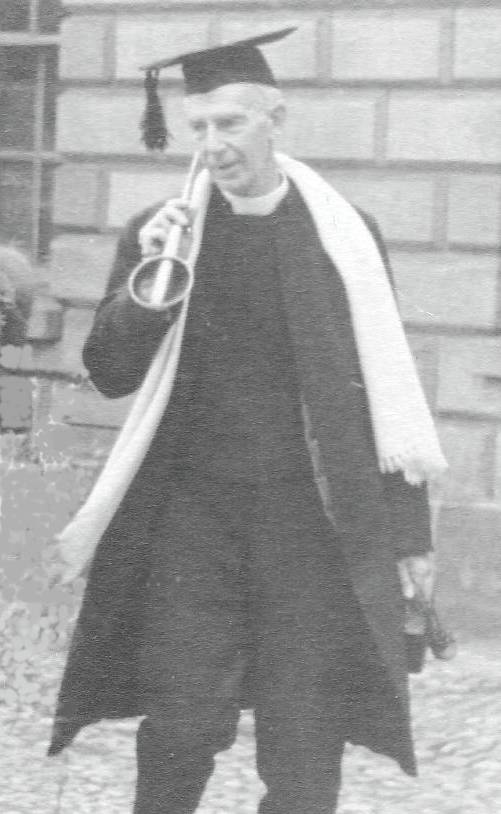
Robin Gwynn at Trinity College Dublin, 1942
