= John Tudor Gwynn =

Irish cricketer, civil servant and reporter in British India

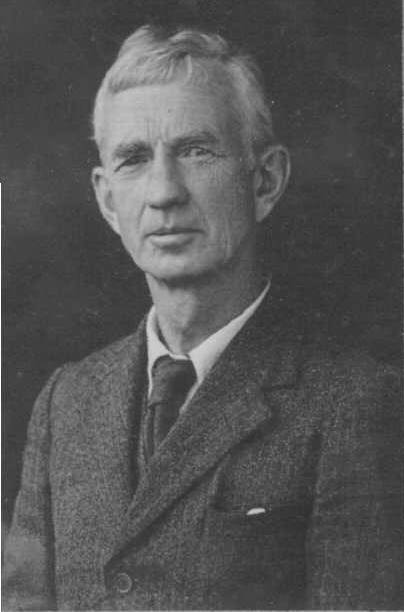
- Gwynn as headmaster of Baymount, c. 1940

Personal information
- Full name: John Tudor Gwynn
- Born: 13 November 1881; Ramelton, Ireland
- Died: 17 May 1956 (aged 74); Bangor, Northern Ireland
- Batting: Right-handed
- Relatives: Lucius Gwynn (brother); Arthur Gwynn (brother); Robert Gwynn (brother); John Gwynn (nephew); Donough O'Brien (cousin)

Domestic team information
- Years: Team
- 1919/20–1920/21: Europeans

Career statistics
Competition	First-class
Matches	2
Runs scored	26
Batting average	6.50
100s/50s	–/–
Top score	14
Balls bowled	90
Wickets	0
Bowling average	–
5 wickets in innings	–
10 wickets in match	–
Best bowling	–
Catches/stumpings	2/–
- Source: ESPNcricinfo, 2 January 2022

John Tudor ("Jack") Gwynn, CIE, ICS (13 November 1881 – 17 May 1956) was an Irish-born British civil servant in India and cricketer.

== Early life and cricket career ==
The seventh son of the Very Rev John Gwynn D.D. and Lucy Josephine O’Brien, he was born at Ramelton, County Donegal, while his father was Dean of Raphoe. Following in the footsteps of his elder brothers he was educated at St Columba's College, Rathfarnham and Trinity College, Dublin. Like the three brothers immediately preceding him, Lucius, Arthur and Robin, he was an outstanding cricketer, and like them he in his turn captained first the St Columba's XI and then the Dublin University XI. He did not however go on to represent the Ireland cricket team internationally.

While working in the Indian Civil Service Jack Gwynn represented the "Europeans" in two first-class matches against the "Indians" in 1919 and 1920.

== Indian Civil Service career ==
After graduating Jack Gwynn joined the Indian Civil Service. He started his first tour of duty in India in 1905. During a period of home leave Jack became engaged to Joan Sedding, a relative through marriage of his elder brother Lucius. Joan's father was the ecclesiastical architect John Sedding. Both of Joan's parents had died while Joan was in her infancy and she had been brought up by a maternal aunt and uncle, the Rawlinsons; her cousin Katharine, the one who had married Lucius Gwynn, was like an elder sister to her and probably had a hand in arranging the match. Jack and Joan's wedding took place in Colombo in 1912.

At the outbreak of the first World War Jack and Joan Gwynn were on home leave. Jack was retained in London and placed on special duty at the Admiralty. It was during this period in England that the couple's three children were born: Peter (1916–1999), Rose (1918–2012) and Katharine (1920–2008).

Jack Gwynn had to retire from the ICS in 1921 because of deafness. However he had no sooner retired than the Manchester Guardian newspaper head-hunted him and sent him back to India as their correspondent. He wrote a series of articles for the paper which, in 1924, were published in book form under the title Indian Politics.

== Journalistic career ==
Gwynn was still working for the Guardian when he and his family moved to Dublin in 1926. Apart from a break when he covered the Round Table Conference in 1934 – he already knew Mahatma Gandhi and had a great admiration for him – he served as the Irish correspondent of the Guardian until 1936. He continued to review occasional books for the paper until a year or two before his death.

In 1936 Jack Gwynn became the Headmaster of a boys’ preparatory school on the north side of Dublin, Baymount School, which he had bought from its founder William Scott. He and his wife ran the school successfully for a decade in spite of financial difficulties.

Baymount School was closed down in 1948. A couple of years later Gwynn put the house and grounds up for sale. They were purchased by the Society of Jesus and subsequently converted into a Jesuit retreat named Manresa House. Jack and Joan Gwynn stayed for a while in Clontarf, near Baymount, before moving to live with their daughter and son-in-law, Katharine and Laurence Liddle, in Bangor, County Down in 1953.

John Tudor Gwynn died in 1956 and Joan Gwynn in 1965.

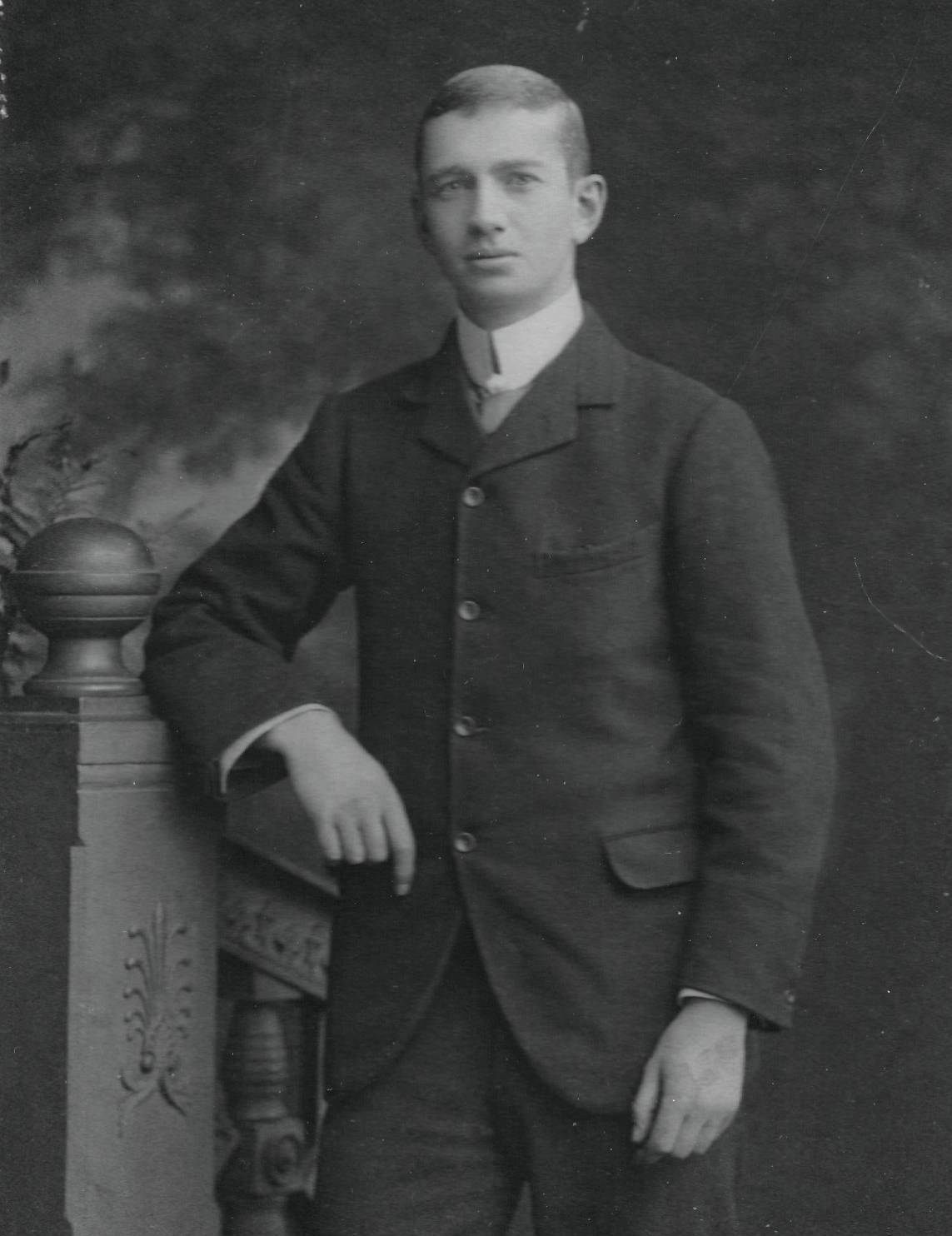
Jack Gwynn as a young man, c.1901

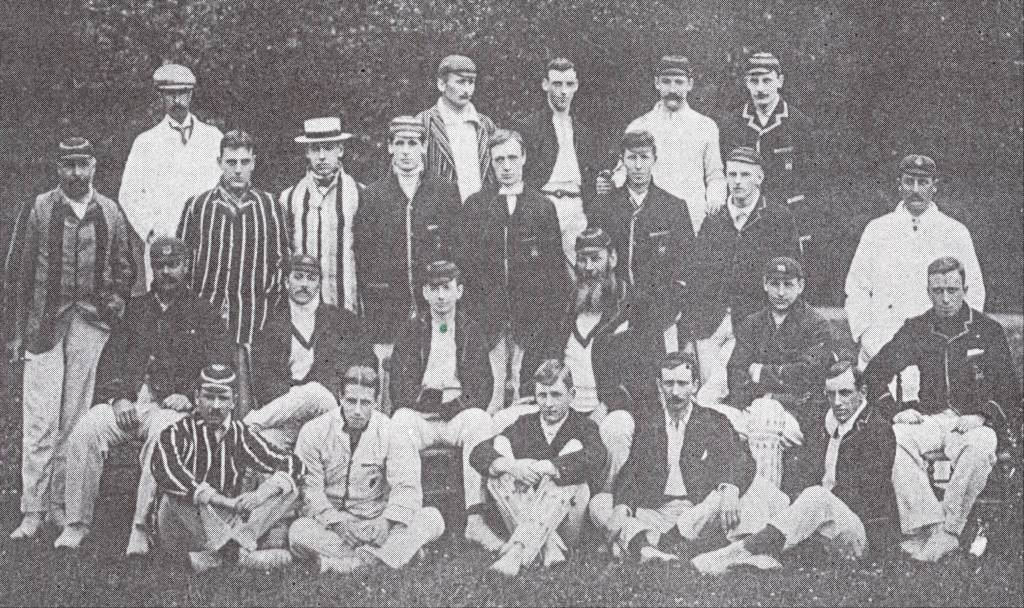
The 1903 Dublin University Cricket team (plus opponents). Jack Gwynn, captain, seated centre beside W G Grace.
