= Donough O'Brien =

Donough O'Brien may refer to:

- Donough O'Brien (cricketer) (1879–1953), Welsh-born Irish cricketer
- Sir Donough O'Brien, 1st Baronet (1642–1717), Irish politician and baronet
- Donough O'Brien, 16th Baron Inchiquin (1897–1968)
- Donough O'Brien, 2nd Earl of Thomond (died 1553)
- Donogh O'Brien, 4th Earl of Thomond (died 1624)
- Donough O'Brien (died 1582)

== See also ==
- Donnchad mac Briain (died 1064), 11th-century king of Munster
