= John Martley =

John Martley (1844–1882) was an Irish 19th century poet. He contributed pieces to several Dublin magazines before his early death in 1882. His works were posthumously collected in Fragments in Prose and Verse (1883).

== Life ==
John Martley, the third son of Henry Martley, Q.C., afterwards a Judge of the Landed Estates Court, Ireland, was born in Dublin on 15 May 1844. He was educated at Cheltenham College at St. Columba's College, Rathfarnham; and at Trinity College, Dublin, where he took his degree of B.A. in 1866. In 1875 he was called to the Irish Bar, but, obtaining an appointment in the Landed Estates Court, he did not practise. He wrote both for Kottabos and for Frothy, a Dublin periodical (1879). He married Frances Howorth, sister of H. Howorth, M.P., and died of consumption on 25 August 1882.

== Works ==
Martley's work is: Fragments in Prose and Verse (published posthumously, 1883). G. F. Savage-Armstrong makes the following assessment of Martley as a writer: "Like Mulvany, [he] excelled as a parodist; but his parodies lack the completeness and the original surprises of Mulvany's. His serious poems have the same tendency to lose force and power as they advance. He manifests a higher culture, a greater tenderness, and a purer taste than Mulvany; and his skill in versification is sometimes, though not always, masterly."
