= Alan Ruddock (journalist) =

Irish journalist

Alan Ruddock (1960–2010) was an Irish journalist and newspaper editor. He edited Irish edition of The Sunday Times from its inception in 1993 until 1996.

== Biography ==
Educated at Brook House, Monkstown, Co. Dublin and St Columba's College, Dublin, proceeding to Trinity College Dublin where he graduated in 1983 with a degree in History. He worked for a time in South Africa before returning to Ireland. Emigrating to England, he worked for Today, before returning to Ireland becoming business editor of the Sunday Tribune in 1992 he became deputy editor of The Sunday Times and then editor of its Irish edition in 1993.

His tenure as editor saw the development of the paper, and also his involvement in high-profile legal cases involving Albert Reynolds and another involving IRA Leader Thomas 'Slab' Murphy.

From 1998 to 2000 he edited The Scotsman newspaper, at the time of the creation of the devolved Scottish Parliament.

He contributed to the Sunday Independent, The Observer and wrote a column for City A.M. In 2007 he published Life in full flight a biography of Ryanair CEO Michael O'Leary.

A keen cricketer all his life he fell ill while playing a cricket match in Wicklow and died on 30 May 2010.
