= Crawford Aramaic New Testament manuscript =

12th-century Syriac (Aramaic) manuscript containing 27 books of the New Testament

The Crawford Aramaic New Testament manuscript is a 12th-century Aramaic manuscript containing 27 books of the New Testament. This manuscript is notable because its final book, the Book of Revelation, is the sole surviving manuscript of any Aramaic (Syriac) version of the otherwise missing Book of Revelation from the Peshitta Syriac New Testament. Five books were translated into Syriac later for the Harklean New Testament.

It is held in the John Rylands Library in Manchester, and is sometimes called the "Crawford MS" because it is so inscribed on the backstrip after having previously been in the library of the oriental manuscript collector Alexander Lindsay, 25th Earl of Crawford the Earl of Crawford and Balcarres. The library was sold by the 26th Earl of Crawford to Enriqueta Rylands in 1901, and there are other manuscripts from the Earl's collection at John Rylands also called Crawford manuscripts, including the "Crawford Codex" a Latin translation of the Almagest from Arabic by Gerhard of Cremona.

The Irish Syriacist John Gwynn having compiled an edition of the Catholic Epistles, also missing from the Peshitta from 20 manuscripts, (1893) used this single manuscript to supply the missing Book of Revelation (1897). Gwynn's editions comprised the third and final section of the 1905 United Bible Societies Peshitta, still the standard scholarly edition today. Gwynn considered that this Aramaic Revelation was not from the original Peshitta version but one which Gwynn identified as being from what he called the Philoxenian Version, an Aramaic revision of the Syriac Bible made under the auspices of Philoxenus, bishop of Mabbug circa 507. Basing his opinion on the testimony of Moses of Aghel, Gwynn considered that Philoxenus' chorepiscopus Polycarpus made a new translation from the Greek New Testament of the missing books.

== The text of the Syriac New Testament ==
The Syriac manuscript contains some notable differences from the Greek, indicating variant Greek originals or conflation.

== A page from codex ==
Legend: Red Color: BSU. Blue Text: Only in Crawford Codex.

Folio 120 a Codex CRAWFORD page with the beginning of John's Revelation Book. The Rubric connects the codex with the last book and shows the historical context in which was written.
Transcription to Codex CRAWFORD, with classic points of vowel-isolation, Page 120, Apocalypse of Johan, the introduction rubric. Author: John.

Transliteration of Codex CRAWFORD, with points of vowel-sing, Page 120, Revelation of John, the introduction rubric. Author: John.
