= John Gwynn (Syriacist) =

Irish Syriacist

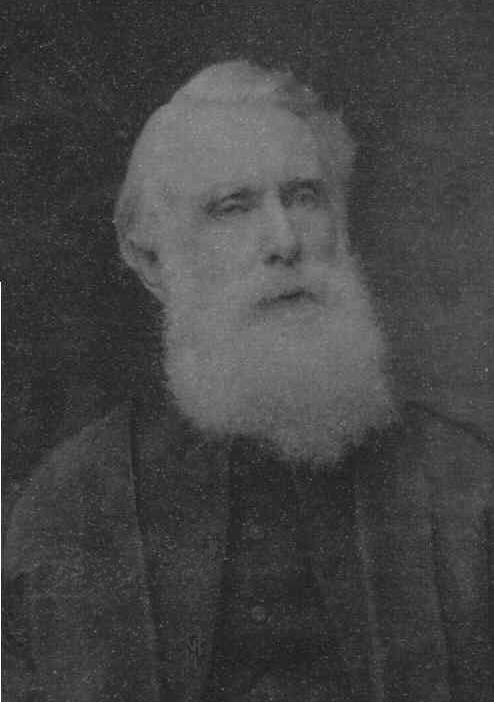
- John Gwynn DD, Professor of Divinity
- Born: 28 August 1827; Larne, Co Antrim
- Died: 3 April 1917; Dublin

John Gwynn (28 August 1827 – 3 April 1917) was an Irish Syriacist. He was Regius Professor of Divinity at Trinity College Dublin from 1888 to 1907.

== Biography ==
John Gwynn (1827–1917) was born in Larne, the eldest son of the Reverend Stephen Gwynne (1792–1873). The Gwynne family had been settled in Ulster since the 17th century. The spelling of the family surname had varied throughout the earlier years; it was John Gwynn, the subject of this article, who settled on "Gwynn" with no "e".

John's grandfather John Gwynne (1761–1852) had studied at Trinity College Dublin. after taking a degree in Divinity he was ordained and became Rector of Kilroot near Carrickfergus, County Antrim. His elder son Stephen (1792–1873), John Gwynn's father, followed a similar career route, graduating from Trinity College Dublin and becoming Rector of Larne, County Antrim, and then Rector of Portstewart, County Londonderry.

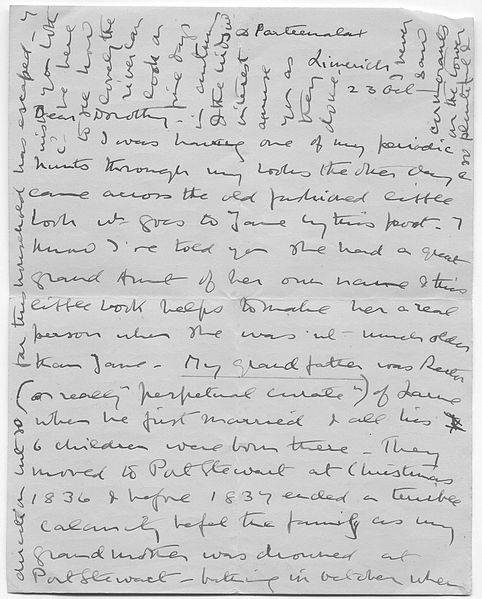
Letter written by John Gwynn's daughter Lucy describing Mary Stevenson's death by drowning

When John Gwynn was only ten years old his mother Mary Stevenson was drowned, together with her maid, while bathing off the rocks on the Londonderry coast. The two daughters and four young sons were later taken in hand by a stepmother.

John was educated at Enniskillen Royal School in Ulster, and then followed family tradition by going to Trinity College Dublin. His father's diary (still preserved at Trinity) records John's success in the entrance examinations, in the winter of 1845:

November 12 ... After considerable delay, we received the announcement, viz. John at the head of all the candidates from all the schools, his numbers being 25 ahead of the second best man.

— Trinity 1955

Four years later, as an undergraduate, John Gwynn stood outside Trinity College and watched William Smith O'Brien and other political prisoners being marched through the streets of Dublin on their way to Kingstown (Dún Laoghaire), where a convict ship was waiting to transport them to Van Diemen's Land (Tasmania).

At TCD, John studied mathematics, and was awarded a BA in that subject in 1850. He soon became a Fellow of Trinity, spending the years 1853 to 1856 in minor academic posts at the university. He was then appointed Warden (Headmaster) of St Columba's College at Rathfarnham in County Dublin, a secondary school for sons of the gentry, on the lines of an English public school, which had been founded fourteen years earlier. Around the time John took up this post in 1856, William Smith O'Brien was allowed to return to Ireland and rejoin his family. Two of O'Brien's sons had already been attending St Columba's and a third was due to start there. And so John Gwynn finally met the man he had watched marching in chains a few years earlier. Six years later John married O'Brien's eldest daughter, Lucy Josephine.

The two sons of Anthony Trollope, the novelist, were admitted to St Columba's in 1858, but were withdrawn the following year after John Gwynn had sent one of them home in disgrace, accused of a serious misdemeanour.

John continued studying while working. He took his MA in 1854 and became a Bachelor of Divinity in 1861. After taking holy orders he spent the next twenty years (1863 to 1883) working as a clergyman in County Donegal and County Londonderry. He was much involved in the process of "disestablishment" of the Church of Ireland, which took place in 1869. Simultaneously he was preparing to take his Doctorate in Divinity from Trinity, which he achieved in 1880.

Then in 1883 he returned to Trinity College as a Divinity Lecturer; five years later he was appointed Regius Professor of Divinity. A meticulous scholar and linguist, John had mastered Latin, Greek and Hebrew while an undergraduate student, and later taught himself Syriac. He studied Syriac while commuting by train between Ulster and Dublin, partly in order to give himself some mental occupation during the journey. Over the years he published numerous learned articles. His greatest work, which took him twenty years to complete, was a landmark annotated edition of a ninth century Irish manuscript written in Latin and known as the Book of Armagh.

John Gwynn also produced editions of the five books missing from the traditional canon of the New Testament which are found in the Aramaic New Testament of the Peshitta: 2 John, 3 John, 2 Peter, Jude (all in 1893), and Revelation (in 1897). He worked from twenty different manuscripts for the epistles, but had to rely on only one, the Crawford Aramaic New Testament manuscript, for Revelation. These were later added to the Gospels and Epistles of Philip E. Pusey and George Gwilliam to produce the 1905 United Bible Societies standard edition of the Syriac Peshitta.

== Family ==
John and Lucy Gwynn had eight sons and two daughters. Their elder daughter, Lucy Penelope Gwynn (1865–1947), made a notable contribution to the cause of women's education when she was appointed the first Lady Registrar at Trinity College. In this role, she helped private women students from England to benefit from the college's pioneering "equal rights" policy and proceed to a degree, as well as looking after the interests of female Trinity students. She never married.

The younger daughter, Mary Katharine Gwynn (1879–1955), married widower Henry Cole Bowen of Bowen's Court, County Cork, thus becoming the stepmother of writer Elizabeth Bowen. In later life Mary suffered from severe deafness.

Stephen Lucius Gwynn (1864–1950), the eldest and most famous of the sons, was an MP, a prominent Irish patriot and a prolific writer. He married his first cousin, Mary Louise (1865–1941), known as May Gwynn, who was the eldest daughter of the Reverend James Gwynn (1829–1869), pastor of the fashionable Octagon Chapel in Bath. May, with her children, entered the Roman Catholic church while in her thirties, and her second son Aubrey Osborn Gwynn SJ later became a Jesuit priest.

Other sons were Edward John Gwynn (1868–1941), an academic like his father, sometime Provost of Trinity College Dublin; Major General Sir Charles William Gwynn KCB (1870–1963), sometime Commandant of the Staff College, Camberley; Lucius Henry Gwynn (1873–1902), another Trinity academic as well as a brilliant cricketer and footballer, who died of TB at an early age; Arthur Percival Gwynn (1875–1898), again a talented cricketer, who joined the Indian Civil Service, was sent out to Burma and died there, of septicaemia, at the age of twenty-one; Robert (Robin) Malcolm Gwynn (1877–1962), a cleric-academic like his father, who was a long-serving, very active Fellow of Trinity College and a bold champion of liberal causes; John Tudor Gwynn (1881–1956), at various times Indian Civil Servant, journalist and writer, and head of Baymount Preparatory School near Dublin; and Brian James Gwynn (1883–1972), soldier then Irish civil servant.

== John Gwynn (professor) and John Gwyn (philanthropist) ==
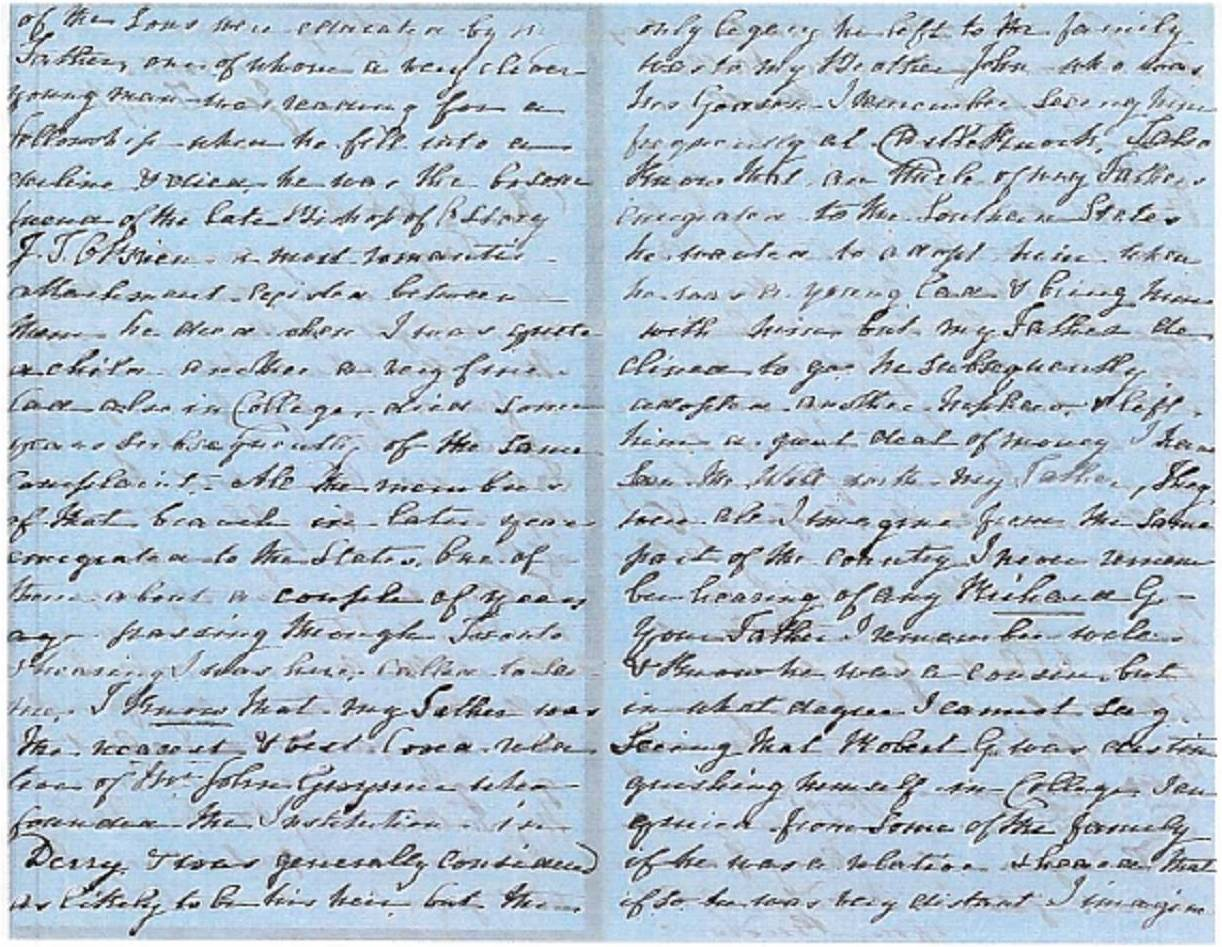
Ellen Green's letter to her cousin John Gwynn

In the 1880s John Gwynn corresponded with relatives in an effort to clarify the relationship of the well known Derry benefactor John Gwyn to his own branch of the family. John Gwyn had died in 1829, leaving a substantial bequest with which the Gwyn Charitable Institution had been set up in Derry. The exact line of kinship connecting John Gwyn to John Gwynn was never established, but Mrs Ellen M. Green, John Gwynn's third cousin and the sister of John Gwynne, a Judge of the Canadian Supreme Court, testified that John Gwyn the benefactor had regarded her late father (Rev William Gwynne DD) as his closest relative.

E.M. Green's letter to John Gwynn reads: "I know that my Father was the nearest & best loved relative of Mr John Gwynne who founded the Institution..." She further mentions that her brother John was the Derry benefactor's godson and inherited a gold watch from him.

== Photographs ==
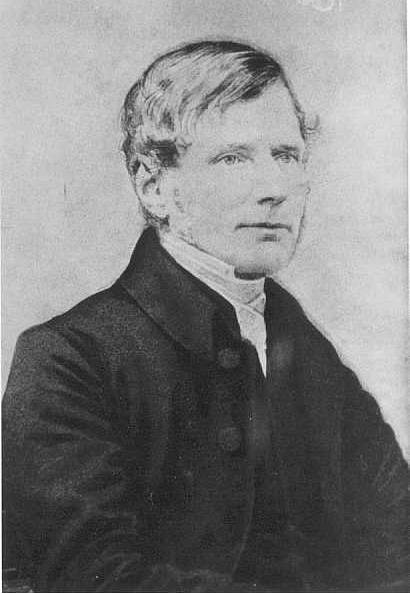
Rev Stephen Gwynne, John Gwynn's father, c.1840

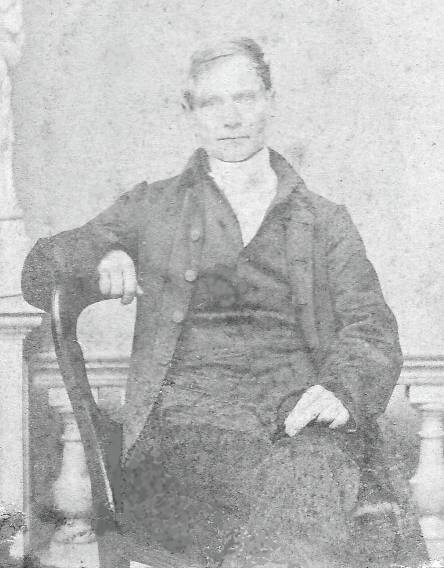
Rev Stephen Gwynne, c.1850

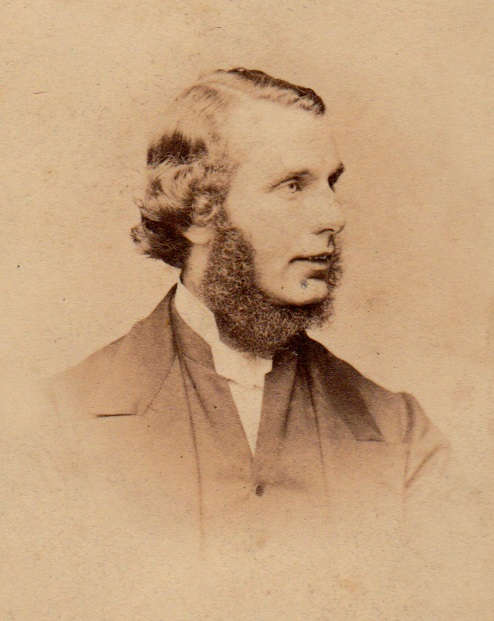
John Gwynn as a young clergyman, c.1860

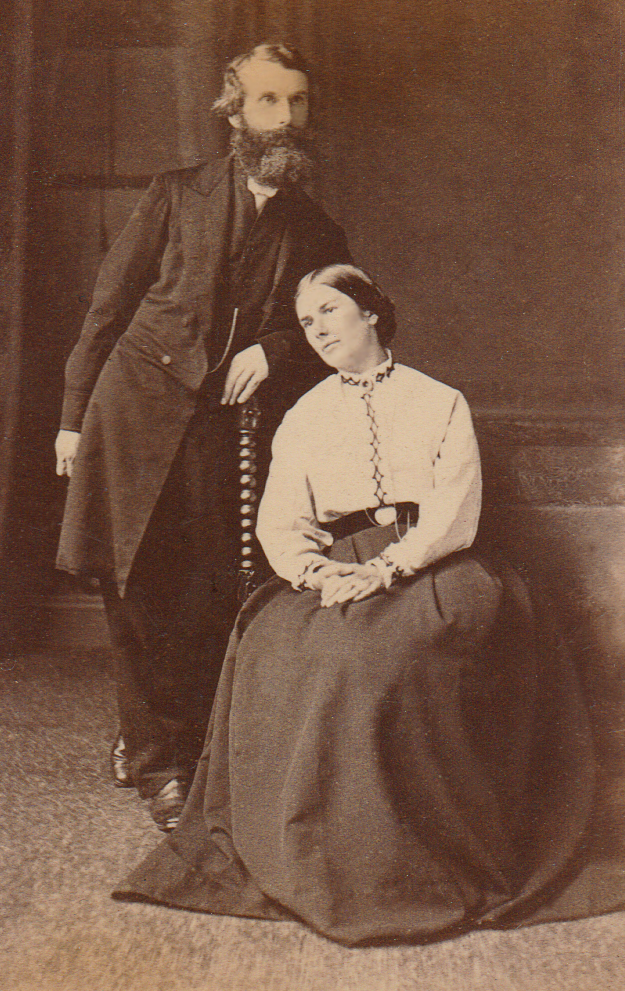
John Gwynn and his wife Lucy Josephine Gwynn, c.1863

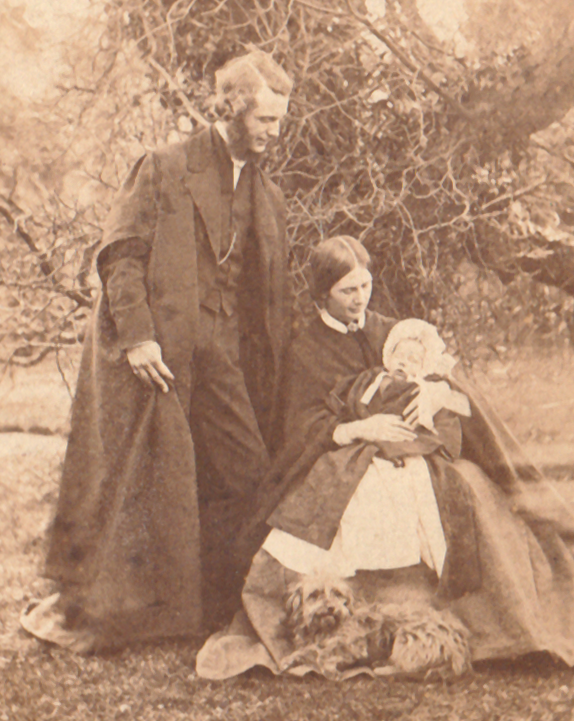
John and Lucy Gwynn with their first child, Stephen Lucius Gwynn, 1864

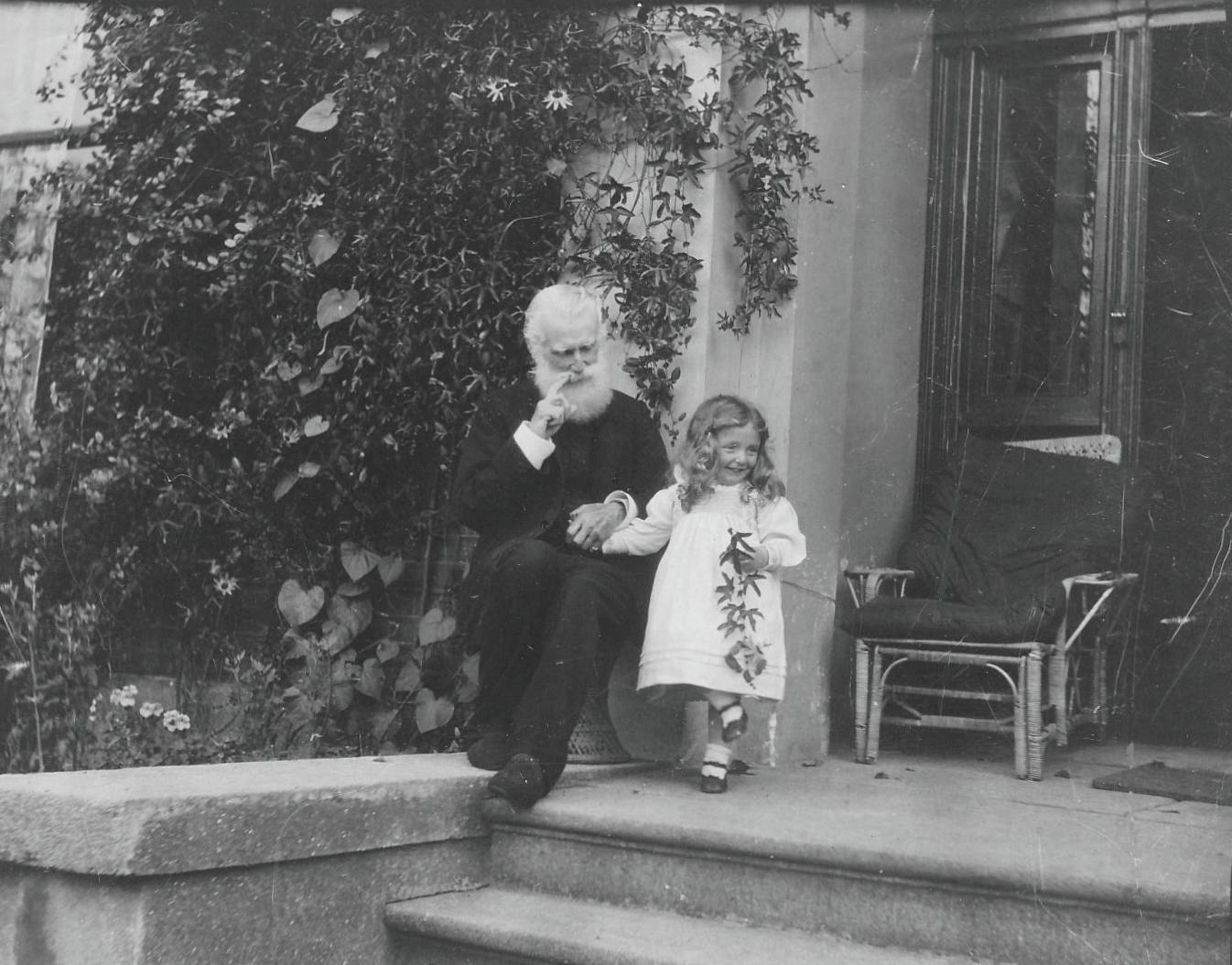
John Gwynn with his granddaughter Rhoda, c.1906

== Works ==
- The Book of Armagh: Liber Ardmachanus, Dublin, 1913
- Two Memoirs on the Syriac Versions of the New Testament, Dublin, 1893
- The Apocalypse of St. John: In a Syriac Version Hitherto Unknown, Dublin, 1897
