= Lucius Gwynn =

Irish sportsman

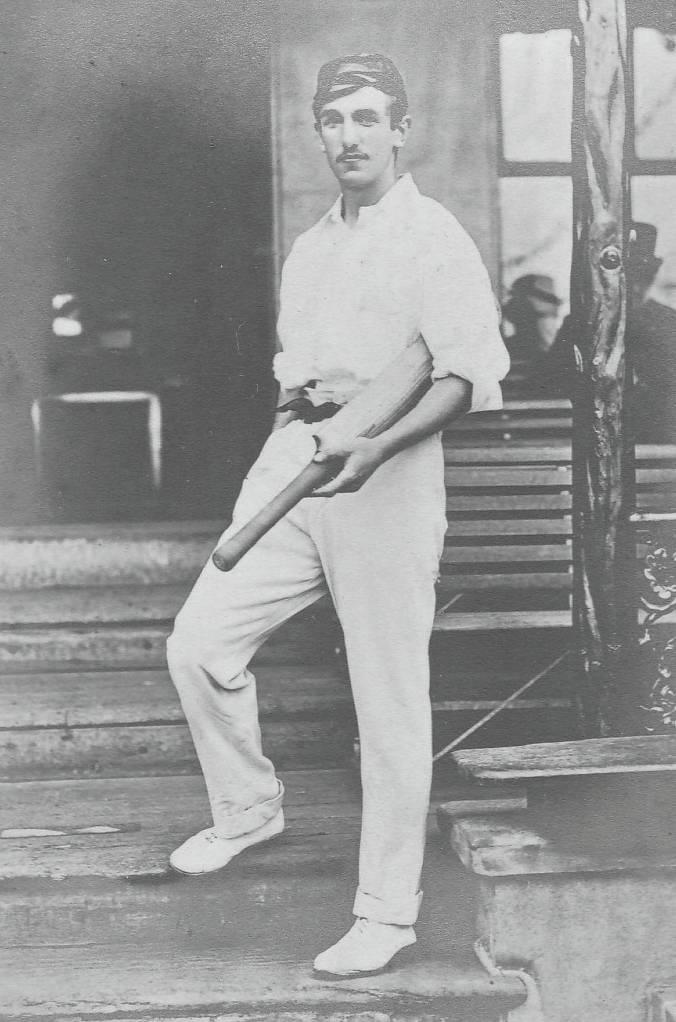

Personal information
- Born: 25 May 1873; Ramelton County Donegal, Ireland
- Died: 23 December 1902 (aged 29); Davos Platz, Switzerland
- Batting: Right-handed
- Bowling: Right-arm medium

International information
- National side: Ireland

Career statistics
Competition	First-class
Matches	8
Runs scored	577
Batting average	44.38
100s/50s	2/3
Top score	153*
Balls bowled	1,101
Wickets	18
Bowling average	22.77
5 wickets in innings	0
10 wickets in match	0
Best bowling	4/81
Catches/stumpings	10/–
- Source: CricketArchive, 6 December 2022

Lucius Henry Gwynn (25 May 1873 – 23 December 1902) was an Irish academic and sportsman who was noted for his prowess in both rugby union football and cricket.

== Life ==
Lucius Gwynn was one member of a family well known in the Dublin of his time for its academic and sporting achievements. He was the fourth son of the Very Rev John Gwynn, Regius Professor of Divinity at Trinity College Dublin, and Lucy Josephine, daughter of the Irish patriot William Smith O'Brien. He and his three immediate younger brothers Arthur, Robin and Jack all in turn captained their school and university cricket teams and played the game at first class level. Lucius was also a talented rugby player.

Lucius Gwynn's academic career outshone even his sporting achievements. He entered Trinity College Dublin as a foundation Scholar and achieved a double first in his degree finals. In 1899 he was elected a Fellow of Trinity College and commenced what promised to be a distinguished academic career.

In 1901 he married Katharine Rawlins of Bristol. He was already suffering from persistent symptoms of debility and fatigue. A few months later a Harley Street physician diagnosed tuberculosis. Lucius was admitted to a sanatorium at Davos Platz in Switzerland, but the illness had progressed too far for any treatment to succeed. He died in December 1902 aged 29. The couple's only child, a daughter named Rhoda, was born in September 1902, just three months before his death.

== Cricketing career ==
At school Lucius was mainly a bowler, his brother Arthur being the superior bat, though this inequality was ironed out at university. Lucius was captain of the Dublin University Cricket Club XI for two seasons, 1894 and 1895, then played under Arthur's captaincy. The three brothers Lucius, Arthur and Robin Gwynn made up a formidable threesome in those years.

Primarily noted for his bowling prowess during early outings with the Dublin University XI, Gwynn took 44 wickets at an average of 8.14 in Trinity's annus mirabilis of 1893, a season which witnessed victories over Leicestershire, Oxford University, Warwickshire (dismissed for a paltry total of 15 runs) and a draw against Essex.

Gwynn, a right-handed batsman, who recorded the highest first class average (56.87) amongst those batsmen who completed ten innings or more during the English season of 1895, enjoyed another remarkably productive season in 1896, plundering over a thousand runs in Trinity flannels, a superlative effort complemented by a haul of 93 wickets at 9.37. Gwynn's irrepressible form reputedly earned him an invitation to represent England against Australia in the second Ashes Test at Old Trafford in July 1896. However, concurrent university examinations rendered Gwynn unable to participate. Instead, English cricket was introduced to the wizardry of K.S. Ranjitsinhji, who took Gwynn's place.

He made his debut for Ireland against I Zingari in July 1892 and went on to play for Ireland 13 times, his last game coming in May 1902 against the MCC. Two of his matches for Ireland had first-class status.

He also played first-class cricket in two Gentlemen v Players matches, representing the gentlemen, and four matches for Dublin University in 1895, for whom he made his top score of 153 not out against Leicestershire. In all, he amassed 3,195 runs and 311 wickets for Dublin University, in addition to 499 runs and 14 wickets for Ireland.

== Rugby Union ==
Remarkably, Gwynn also represented Ireland seven times at rugby union, debuting against Scotland at Belfast in February 1893. He featured in all three legs of Ireland's 1894 Triple Crown-winning campaign.

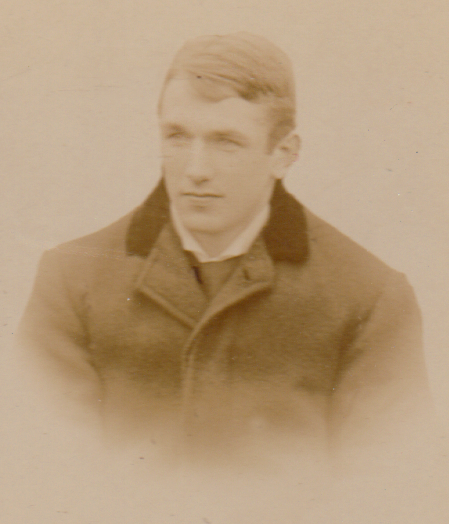
Lucius Gwynn as a student

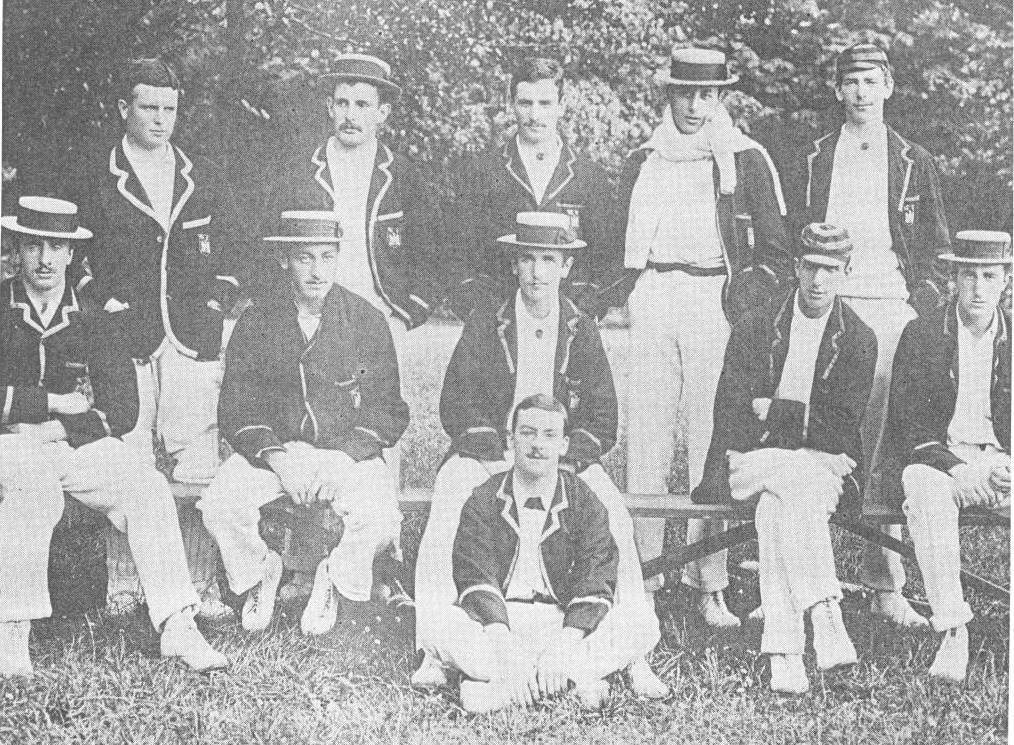
1895 Dublin University team, captain Lucius Gwynn

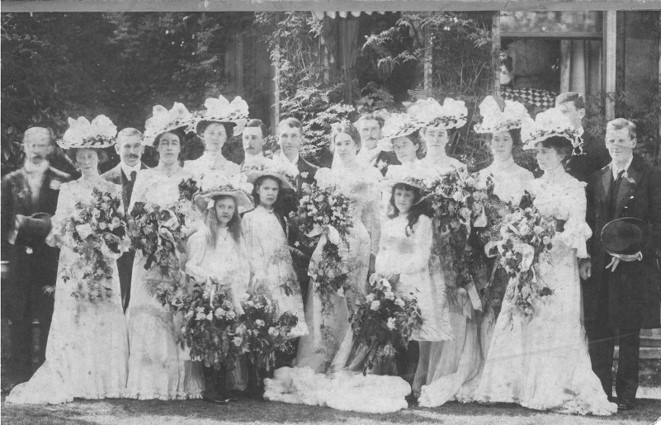
Wedding of Lucius Gwynn and Katharine Rawlins, 1902

== See also ==
- List of Irish cricket and rugby union players
