= Edward Gwynn =

Irish academic

Edward John Gwynn

36th Provost of Trinity College Dublin
- In office 1 August 1927 – 30 July 1937
- Preceded by: John Bernard
- Succeeded by: William Thrift

Personal details
- Born: Edward John Gwynn; 1 April 1868 Ramelton, County Donegal, Ireland
- Died: 10 February 1941 (aged 72) Dublin, Ireland
- Spouse: Olive Mary Ponsonby (m. 1906)
- Children: 5
- Education: St Columba's College
- Alma mater: Trinity College Dublin

Edward John Gwynn (1 April 1868 – 10 February 1941) was an Irish academic who served as the 36th Provost of Trinity College Dublin from 1927 to 1937. He was also President of the Royal Irish Academy from 1934 to 1937. Professor Gwynn was a scholar of Old Irish and Celtic literature.

== Biography ==
Edward John Gwynn (1868–1941), the second son of the Very Reverend Dr John Gwynn, D.D., and Lucy Josephine O'Brien, was born in 1868 at Aughnagaddy in Ramelton in the north of County Donegal in Ulster. His father was the Rector of Tullyaughnish (or Ramelton). As a teenager, he attended St Columba's College, Rathfarnham, where his father had earlier been headmaster.

In 1885, after completing his secondary education, Gwynn attended Trinity College Dublin. His father was then Lecturer in Divinity at the college. In 1888, he won a scholarship in classics. Edward graduated with distinction, winning the large gold medal for classics as well as a gold medal for ethics and logic. In 1893, he was elected a Fellow of Trinity College.

From Latin and Greek, Gwynn then turned his attention to Early Irish. His father had worked for years on the Book of Armagh, an Irish text written in Latin; Edward made ancient texts in Irish his special field. At that time Irish studies did not form part of the range of subjects which were taught at Trinity College. However, Edward was able to commence his research under the aegis of the Royal Irish Academy, of which he was elected a member in 1896. Two years later, he became its Professor of Celtic Languages. As an efficient administrator as well as a serious scholar he was to remain a key figure in the affairs of the Academy for the rest of his working life. He served as President of the Academy for the period 1934 to 1937.

In the following years, Gwynn published numerous articles, translations and commentaries in connection with his research on ancient Irish. His best-known work was his edition of the Dindshenchas, a collection of legends in prose and verse explaining the origins of Irish place names. He also translated and annotated texts concerning monastic life in Tallaght, and masterminded the production of a detailed catalogue of the Irish manuscripts in the Academy's collection.

In 1903, Gwynn helped to found the School of Irish Learning in Dublin. He joined its board of governors and played an active part in its programme of lectures and seminars, which were open to the public. From 1905 to 1915 he also served as one of the Commissioners for National Education. In 1907, the post of Lecturer in Celtic Languages was created at Trinity, and Gwynn became its first incumbent.

At around this time a proposal to create a new college in Dublin specifically for Roman Catholic students, to which Trinity College would be tied in some kind of federal structure, was causing fierce controversy. Knowing that the plan was based on incorrect assumptions and would prove unworkable, Gwynn spoke out against it with quiet but irrefutable logic. The plan was subsequently dropped.

Gwynn gathered various honours in recognition of his services to Irish scholarship. The National University of Ireland awarded him the degree of D.Litt.Celt. in 1926, and later he received honorary doctorate degrees from the Universities of Oxford, Glasgow, Wales, and Durham.

In 1927, "E.J." was appointed Provost of Trinity College Dublin, a job for which he - a scholar with administrative skills - was ideally suited. He carried out his duties with characteristic energy and ability until halted by ill health. He had suffered some years from tuberculosis and between 1913 and 1917, he had spent two periods at a sanatorium in Switzerland, which had afforded a partial recovery. A resurgence of the disease forced him to resign from the Provostship in 1937; he was an invalid for the remaining four years of his life. He was made an honorary fellow in 1937.

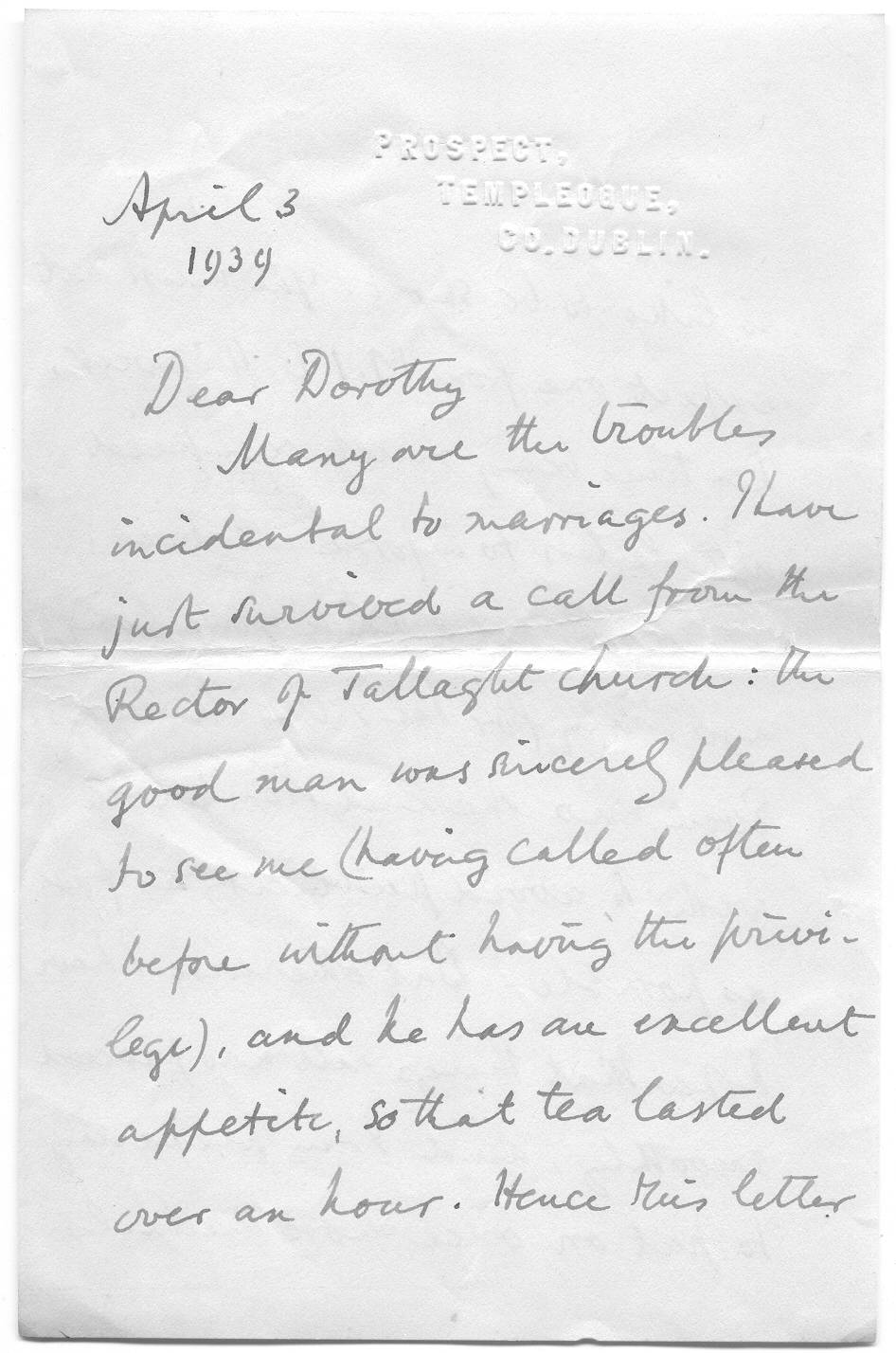
Letter written by Edward Gwynn to his daughter in law, 1939

After Edward Gwynn's death, a colleague recalled not only his keen intellect but also "that well-known smile, so full of mellow wisdom, infinite kindness and quietly amused tolerance of the foibles and extravagances of smaller minds".

== Family ==
Edward Gwynn married Olive Mary Ponsonby (1881–1970), daughter of Colonel Justinian Gordon Ponsonby, in 1906. The couple had five children:

- John David Gwynn (1907–1998), known as David or "J.D.", became a civil engineer and spent many years working on innovative hydroelectric and other alternative energy generation projects.
- Arthur Montagu Gwynn (1908–2008), "A.M.", an entomologist turned doctor of medicine, had a varied working life which included pest control in Africa; war service in the British army (where he earned a Military Cross for bravery); Antarctic exploration; and editorship of the Medical Journal of Australia.
- Lucy Margaret ("Pic") Gwynn (1911–1987) was active in voluntary work for the welfare of students and many other causes. She married the Irish geologist and expert in quaternary studies, Professor Frank Mitchell.
- Edward Harold Gwynn (1912–2007) became a Whitehall civil servant, rising to the position of Deputy Under-Secretary of State in the Ministry of Defence.
- Olive Ruth Gwynn (1915–1981) qualified as a veterinary surgeon before she married the Irish sculptor Oisín Kelly.

== Photographs ==
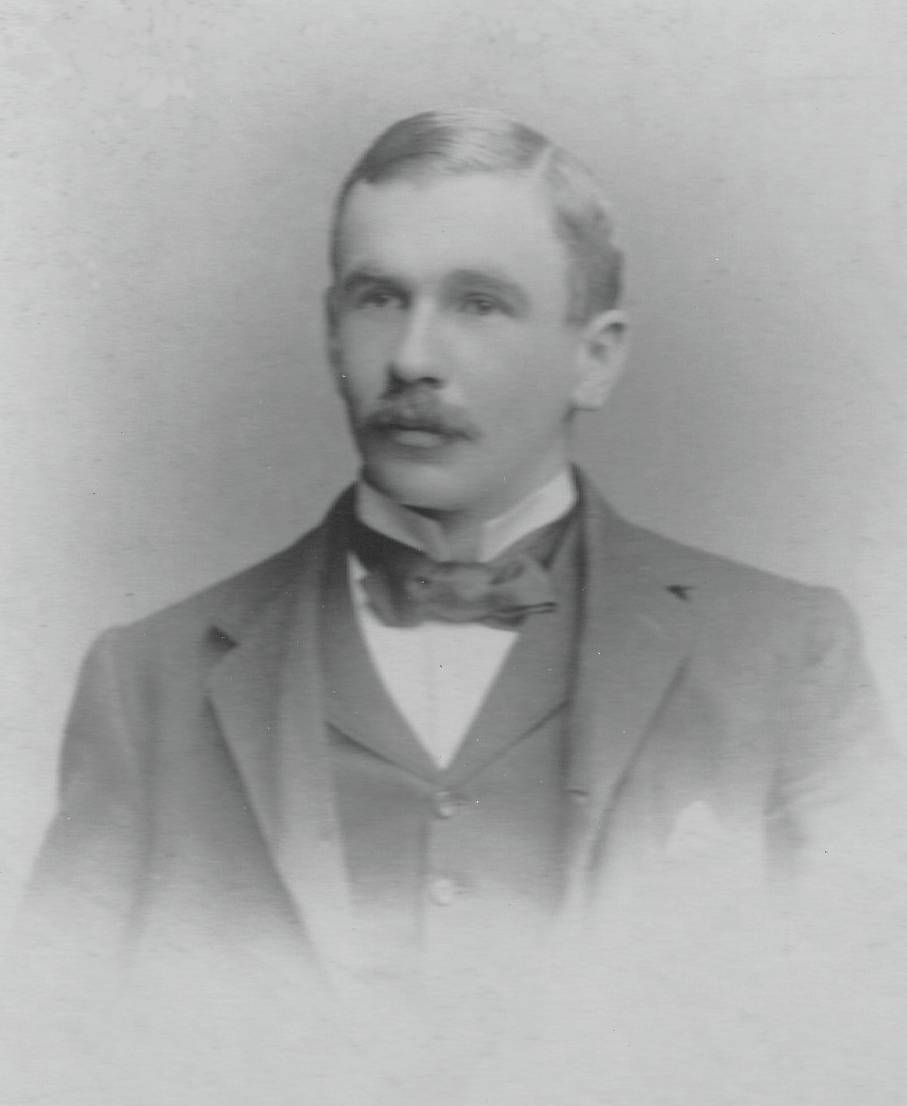
Edward Gwynn as a young man, c.1888

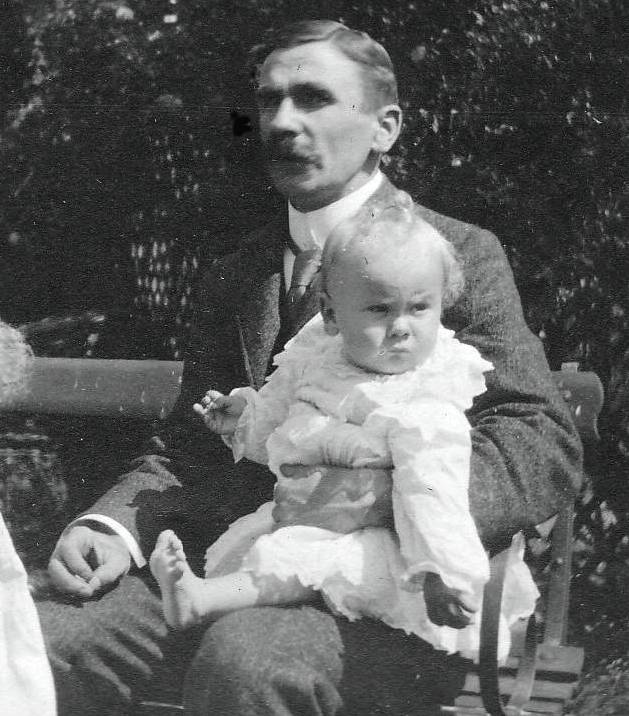
Edward Gwynn with his son Harold, 1913

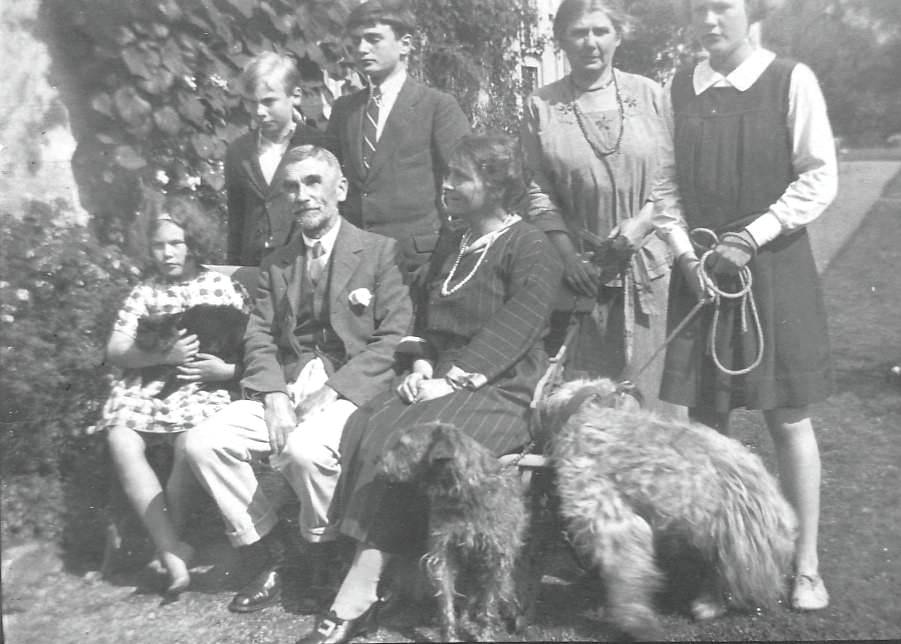
Edward Gwynn with family members, c.1923

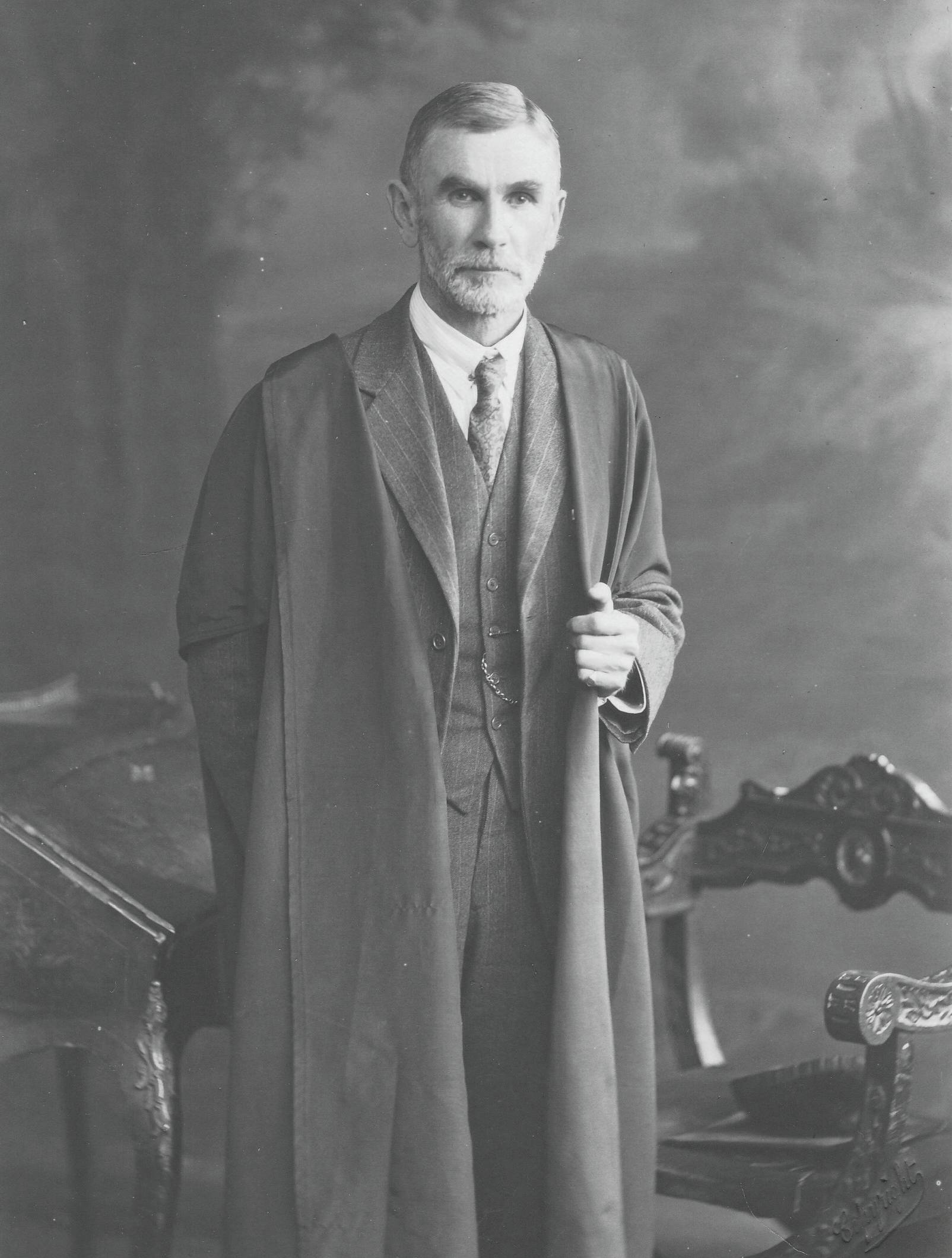
Edward Gwynn after appointment as Provost, 1927

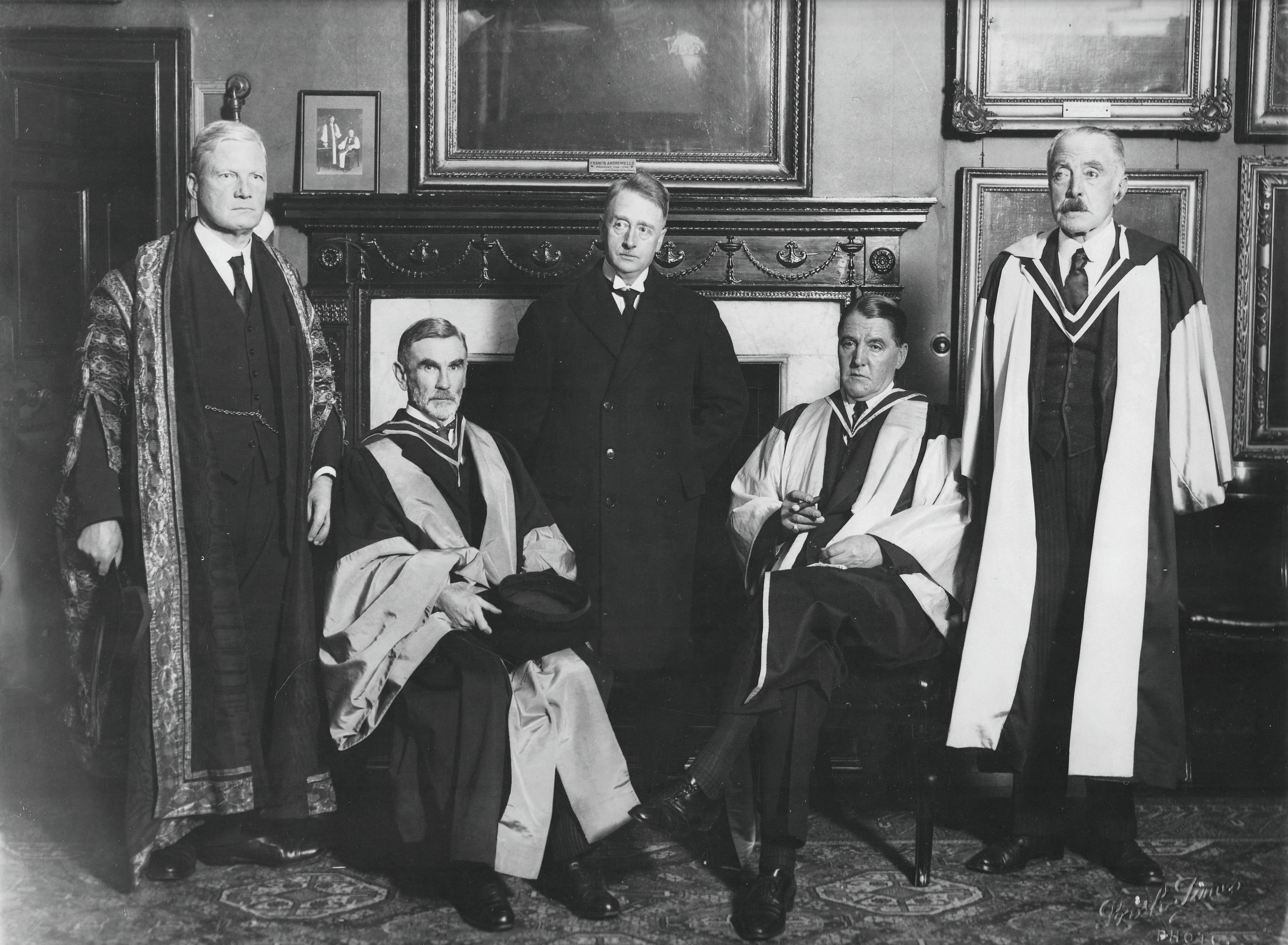
Provost Edward Gwynn with William Cosgrave and others, 1927

== Publications ==
- The Metrical Dindshenchas, 5 vols, Hodges Figgis, Dublin, 1903–1935
- The burning of Finn's house (with J. H. Lloyd), Ériu 1 (pp 13–37), 1904
- The priest and the bees, Ériu 2 (pp 82–83), 1905
- The three drinking-horns of Cormac ua Cuinn (edited and translated), Ériu 2 (pp 186–188), 1905
- On a source of O'Clery's Glossary, Hermathena 14:33 (pp 464–480), 1907
- Notes, Ériu 3 (pp 190–193), 1907
- On a source of O'Clery's Glossary, Hermathena 15:35 (pp 389–396), 1909
- An unrecorded gloss, Ériu 4 (p 182), 1908–10
- De arreis, Ériu 5 (pp 45–48), 1911
- The monastery of Tallaght (With Walter J. Purton), Proceedings of the Royal Irish Academy XXIX (C), *1911–1912
- An Irish penitential, Ériu 7 (pp 121–195), 1914
- Catalogue of the Irish Manuscripts in the Library of Trinity College, Dublin (with T.K. Abbott), Hodges & Figgis, Dublin, 1921
- Miscellanea: Eogan, Ériu 9 (pp 27–30), 1921–23
- Tomás Costelloe and O'Rourke’s wife (with Turlough O'Reilly), Ériu 9 (pp 1–11), 1921–23
- A note on O'Davoren’s glossary, Ériu 9 (pp 157–158), 1921–23
- The Rule of Tallaght, Hermathena 44, second supplement, 1927
- Athirne’s mother, Zeitschrift für celtische Philologie 17 (pp 153–156), 1928
- The Dindshenchas in the Book of Uí Maine, Ériu 10 (pp 68–91), 1926–28
- Senbriathra Fithail, Revue Celtique 46 (pp 268–271), 1929
- Varia III, Ériu 11 (pp 150–153), 1932
- The Book of Armagh: The Patrician Documents (ed.), Irish Manuscripts Commission, 1937
- Notes on the Irish penitential, Ériu 12 (pp 245–249), 1938
- An Old-Irish tract on the privileges and responsibilities of poets, Ériu 13 (pp 1–60 & 220–236), 1942

Academic offices
Preceded by John Henry Bernard	Provost of Trinity College Dublin; 1919–1927	Succeeded by William Thrift
