= St Columba's College, Dublin =

Private secondary school in Whitechurch, Dublin, Ireland

Coordinates: 53.266376°N 6.270427°W

St Columba's College
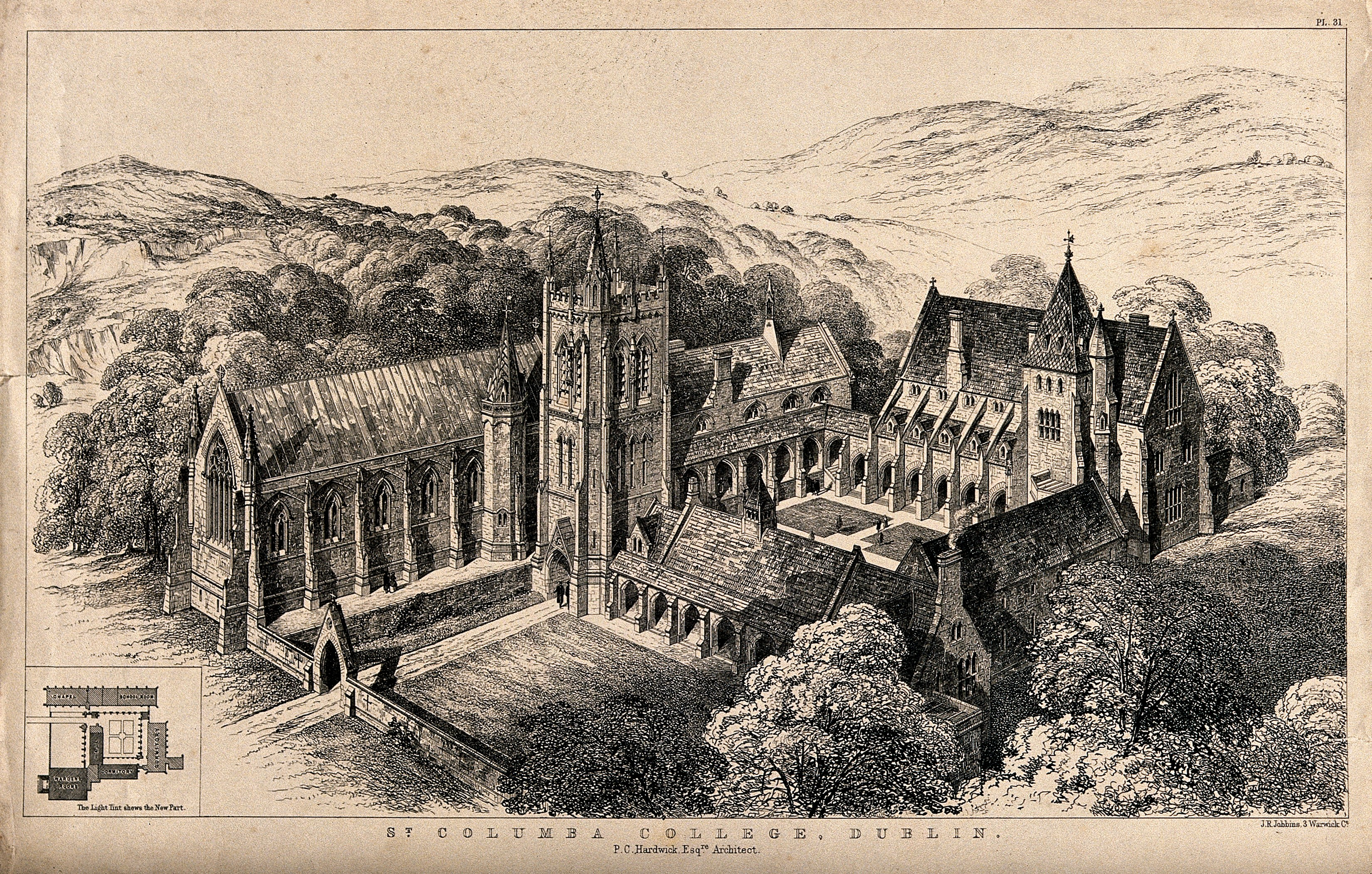
- Whitechurch, Dublin 16; Ireland

Information
- Type: Co-educational private school day and boarding school
- Motto: "Prudentes sicut serpentes, sed simplices sicut columbae" ("As wise as serpents, but as simple as doves")
- Established: 1843; 183 years ago
- School district: Dublin 16
- Principal: Mark Treymane Boobbyer
- Staff: 43
- Enrollment: 304
- Colours: Red, Green, and Navy
- Sports: Rugby, Hockey, Cricket, Athletics, Tennis, Basketball
- Affiliation: Church of Ireland
- Alumni: Old Columbans
- Website: www.stcolumbas.ie

St Columba's College is a co-educational private day and boarding school founded in 1843 located in Whitechurch, County Dublin, Ireland. Among the founders of the college were Viscount Adare (who later became The 3rd Earl of Dunraven and Mount-Earl in 1850), William Monsell (who was later created The 1st Baron Emly in 1874), Dr William Sewell and James Henthorn Todd.

The school is affiliated with the Church of Ireland and caters to 300+ pupils, aged 11 to 19. Alumni are organized in the Old Columban Society. Its campus consists of 140 acres (0.6 km^{2}) on the edge of Dublin and the M50 motorway.

The school has grown up around a series of quadrangles, and major developments since the 1993 150th anniversary have provided it with many modern facilities. In 2004 it opened the Grange Building, housing over 100 boarders, as well as classrooms and house staff accommodation. In 2006, the 19th century Argyle buildings in the heart of the College were refurbished.

The old Cadogan Building opened in January 2008 as a new music school. Academic standards are high; in 2006, the average points score by all Leaving Certificate candidates was 440 out of 625, and in 2007 this went up slightly to 442. In 2008 it was 424, in 2009 446, and in 2010 the highest yet at 459. Over the past five years the average has been: 442 points. Average class size is 12 pupils per teacher. The Sunday Independent newspaper has identified it as the most expensive school in Ireland.

== History ==
The school was originally established at Stackallan House in County Meath in 1843 but moved to its current location at Whitechurch, County Dublin in 1849.

== Terms ==
The school year is divided into three terms of which the first, the Michaelmas Term (September to December) is the longest. The Hilary Term is from January to March. The third is the Trinity Term, from April to June, and this is when external public examinations are taken. The Michaelmas Term has a substantial holiday at half-term, when the college closes down.

There are also shorter half-term breaks in the other terms, including following the St Columba's Day celebrations in late May or early June. Each term there is a three- or four-day Exodus during which the college closes; most pupils from outside of Ireland stay with their guardians, or Irish school friends.

== Old Columban Society ==
Founded in 1909, the Old Columban Society is the alumni organization of the college. The first president of the society was Acting-Warden R M Gwynn supported by OCs W.F.S. Bantry White and Cecil L. Smith. It keeps members in touch with each other and the college and has also published books about the history of the college. The school magazine TheColumban was first published in 1879. During the First World War it denounced the Easter Rising. Many OCs were officers in the British Army, so that when one of them died the bell in college was rung in commemoration. In 1917, a Treasurer was appointed to oversee editorials and printing.

Each year in May the Old Columban Bulletin is published, containing about 25 pages of news of Old Columbans and the college. Regular dinners and drinks parties are organised, in Dublin, London and Belfast. An Old Columban Scholarship is awarded to children of Old Columbans, who are all entitled to a discount on College fees.

Currently they have over 3,000 members, of whom over 50% live in the Republic of Ireland, 5% in Northern Ireland, 16% in Great Britain, 5% in continental Europe and 7% in the rest of the world. Old Columbans Germany has established a website, and is organizing events for Old Columbans from Germany as well as Old Columbans living in Germany.

== Notable alumni ==
- Robert Babington, Ulster Unionist politician and judge
- Arthur W. Barton, a school benefactor
- Christopher Barton, rower (won The Boat Race and an Olympic silver medal in 1948)
- Marcus de la Poer Beresford, 7th Baron Decies, an Anglo-Irish hereditary peer
- John S. Beckett, musician, composer and conductor
- Michael Biggs, sculptor
- Robert Blackburn, educationalist
- Sir Dermot Boyle, Marshal of the Royal Air Force
- Thomas Chamney, former Olympic track and field athlete
- Adam Clayton, musician (U2)
- Brian Faulkner, Prime Minister of Northern Ireland
- Jasmine Guinness, designer and fashion model
- Edward Gwynn, scholar
- Stephen Gwynn, writer and author
- E. Chambré Hardman, pictorialist photographer
- Christopher Robin Haskins, Baron Haskins, businessman, life peer, and former member of the British Labour Party
- Joseph Hone, writer, professor
- Rex Ingram, filmmaker
- Richard Claverhouse Jebb, classicist
- Roy Johnston, Irish physicist
- William John Leech, painter
- John Martley, poet
- Charles Marriott, International cricketer
- Ian McKinley, International rugby player
- Sir Kenneth O'Connor, President of the East African Court of Appeal
- Harry Read, rugby union international and first-class cricketer
- Alan Ruddock, journalist, editor of The Sunday Times Ireland, and The Scotsman
- Patrick Scott, artist
- Victoria Smurfit, actress
- Holly Somerville, botanical illustrator and artist
- William Trevor, KBE, writer
- Peter Wyse Jackson, botanist
- Ivan Yates, politician, former TD
- Michael Yeats, barrister and Fianna Fáil politician

== Wardens ==
- Robert Corbet Singleton (1843–47)
- M.C. Morton (1848–50)
- George Williams (1850–56)
- John Gwynn (1856–64)
- John Longden (1864–67)
- Robert Rice (1867–91)
- Percy Whelan (1891-1904)
- William Parker (1904–08)
- R.M. Gwynn (1909-09), Acting-Warden
- William Blackburn (1909–19)
- R.M. Gwynn, (1919-1919) Acting-Warden
- C.B. Armstrong (1919–33)
- C.W. Sowby (1933–49)
- F.M. Argyle (1949–74)
- D. Gibbs (1974 - 1988)
- T. E. Macey (1988 - 2001)
- Lindsay Haslett (2001-2016)
- M. Boobbyer (2016–present)
