= Donough O'Brien (cricketer) =

Welsh-born Irish cricketer (1879–1953)

Cricket information
- Batting: Right-handed

International information
- National side: Ireland

Career statistics
Competition	First-class
Matches	3
Runs scored	77
Batting average	15.40
100s/50s	0/1
Top score	57
Catches/stumpings	1/–
- Source: CricketArchive, 16 November 2022

Donough O'Brien (29 August 1879 – 23 September 1953) was a Welsh-born Irish cricketer.

== Background ==
O'Brien was born in Holyhead, Anglesey, Wales. He was a cousin of the Gwynn brothers, a famous Irish cricket family. Three of them also represented Ireland at cricket. His nephew, Luke White played for Middlesex.

== Playing career ==
A right-handed batsman, O'Brien made his first-class debut playing for Ireland against Cambridge University in May 1902. This is his only match for Ireland. He later played twice for the MCC against Oxford University, in 1906 and 1907.

He died in Alexandria, Egypt)
