= Gwyn (name) =

- Pronunciation: /ˈɡwin/
- Gender: Male (in Wales and UK) Unisex (mostly US)
- Language: English, Welsh

Origin
- Language: Old Welsh
- Origin: from Welsh Gwyn, is a male name and pronounced Gwin ("white, bright, fair, pure, blessed, holy")
- Meaning: "white, holy"
- Region of origin: Wales

Other names
- Variant forms: Gwynne; Gwynn; Guinn
- Related names: Gwyneth, Gwen, Gwendolen (all traditionally female)

Gwynn, Guinn and Gwyn are given names meaning 'white' or 'blessed' in Welsh and Cornish.

Gwyn and its variants ( including the Anglicised Gwynne) are traditionally Welsh male given names, indicated by the spelling using "y" rather than "e". Gwen or Gwendolen are examples of female equivalents; however, Gwyneth can cause confusion as this is a female name with apparently male spelling. The difference is due to this name having a different etymological origin.

Notable people with the name include:

== Given name ==
- Gwyn Ashton (born 1961), Welsh musician
- Gwyn A. Beattie, American plant pathologist
- Gwyn Coogan (born 1965), American educator, mathematician, and former Olympic runner
- Gwyn Cready (born 1962), American author
- Gwyn Davies (rugby) (1908–1992), Welsh rugby player
- Gwyn Davies (cricketer) (1919–1995), Welsh cricketer
- Gwyn Evans (footballer) (1935–2000), Welsh footballer
- Gwyn Evans (rugby union, born 1957) (born 1957), Welsh rugby player
- Gwynn Evans (1915–2001), Welsh cricketer
- Gwyn Francis (1896–1987), Welsh rugby player
- Gwyn Green (1938–2018), American politician
- Gwyn Griffin (1922–1967), English novelist
- Gwynn ap Gwilym (1950–2016), Welsh poet
- Gwyn Headley (born 1946), British businessman
- Gwyn Hughes (disambiguation), multiple people
- Gwyn Jones (disambiguation), multiple people
- Gwynn Parry Jones (1891–1963), Welsh opera singer
- Gwyn Kirk, British sociologist and anti-nuclear weapon campaigner
- Gwyn Lewis, International diplomat
- Gwyn Martin (1921–2001), Welsh photographer and pharmacist
- Gwyn Manning (1915–2003), Welsh footballer
- Gwyn Morgan, Canadian businessman
- Gwyn Morgan (civil servant) (1934–2010), British Labour Party official and EU civil servant
- Gwyn Morgan (writer) (born 1954), Welsh author
- Gwyn Morgans (born 1932), Welsh professional footballer
- Gwynn Murrill (born 1942), American sculptor
- Gwyn Nicholls (1874–1939), Welsh rugby union player
- Gwyn Hanssen Pigott (1935–2013), Australian ceramic artist
- Gwyn R. Price, Welsh politician
- Gwyn Prosser (born 1943), British politician
- Gwyn Richards (1905–1985), Welsh rugby player
- Gwyn Richards (cricketer) (born 1951), Welsh cricketer
- Gwyn Roberts, American musician
- Gwyn Rowlands (1928–2010), English rugby player
- Gwyn Hyman Rubio (born 1949), American author
- Gwyn Singleton (1933–2021), Scottish pioneer
- Gwyn Shea (born 1937), American politician
- Gwyn Staley (1927–1958), American race car driver
- Gwyn Thomas (disambiguation), multiple people
- Gwyn R. Tompkins (1861–1938), American horse trainer
- Gwyn Williams (disambiguation), multiple people
- Gwynn Williams (disambiguation), multiple people

== Surname ==
- Aaron Gwyn (born 1972), American novelist
- Anisha Nicole Gwynn (born 1985), American singer better known as Anisha Nicole or Nee-Nee Gwynn (daughter of Tony Sr.)
- Arthur Gwynn (1874–1898), Irish cricketer and rugby player
- Aubrey Gwynn (1892–1983), Irish historian
- Charles Gwynn (1870–1962), Irish-born British Army officer
- Chris Gwynn (born 1964), American baseball player
- David Gwynn (1861–1910), Welsh rugby player
- Denis Rolleston Gwynn (1893–1973), Irish journalist
- Edward Gwynn (1868–1941), Irish literary scholar
- Eirwen Gwynn (1916–2007), Welsh nationalist, teacher, scientist, writer
- Francis Gwyn (1648–1734), Welsh politician
- Gareth Gwynn, Welsh entertainer
- Herbert Britton Gwyn (1873–1934), American newspaper editor
- Howel Gwyn (1806–1888), British politician
- James Gwyn (1828–1906), American Civil War soldier
- John David Gwynn (1907–1998), Irish cricketer
- John Tudor Gwynn (1881–1956), Irish cricketer
- Jovaughn Gwyn (born 1999), American football player
- Lucius Gwynn (1873–1902), Irish rugby player
- Lucy Gwynn (1866–1947), first Lady Registrar in Dublin
- Marcus Gwyn (born 1977), American baseball player
- Mark Gwyn, American law enforcement officer
- Michael Gwynn (1916–1976), British actor
- Nell Gwyn (1650–1687), long-time mistress of King Charles II
- Owen Gwyn (died 1633), Welsh priest
- R. S. Gwynn (born 1948), American poet
- Richard Gwyn (disambiguation), multiple people
- Robert Gwynn (1877–1962), Irish cricketer
- Sandra Gwyn (1935–2000), Canadian journalist
- Stephen Gwynn (1864–1950), Irish journalist
- Tony Gwynn (1960–2014), American baseball player and Hall of Fame member
- Tony Gwynn Jr. (born 1982), American baseball player and son of Tony (Sr.)
- Walter Gwynn (1802–1882), American engineer
- William Gwynn (attorney) (1775–1854), American lawyer, newspaper editor, and civic leader
- William Gwynn (rugby) (1856–1897), Welsh rugby player
- Woody Gwyn (born 1944), American artist

== See also ==
- James O'Gwynn (1928–2011), American musician
- Carol Bishop-Gwyn, Canadian writer
