= Gwyn Morgan (disambiguation) =

Gwyn Morgan is a Canadian businessman. The name may also refer to:

- Gwyn Morgan (writer) (born 1954), Welsh writer
- Gwyn Morgan (civil servant) (1934 – 2010), British Labour Party official and EU diplomat

== See also ==
- Gwyn Morgans (1932 – 2023), Welsh former professional footballer
