= Gwyn Lewis (disambiguation) =

Gwyn Lewis may refer to:

- Gwyn Lewis, Diplomat
- Gwyn Lewis (footballer) (1931-1995), Welsh footballer, see List of Rochdale A.F.C. players (25–99 appearances)
