= Paul Platz (American football) =

American football player and coach (1920–1991)

Biographical details
- Born: July 24, 1920; California, U.S.
- Died: June 15, 1991 (aged 70); San Diego, U.S.

Playing career
- 1940: Cal Poly

Coaching career (HC unless noted)
- 1959: San Diego
- 1961–1967: Poway HS (CA)

Head coaching record
- Overall: 1–5 (college); 34–23–3 (high school)

Paul Frederick Platz (July 24, 1920 – June 15, 1991) was an American football player and coach. He served as the head football coach at the University of San Diego in 1959, compiling a record of 1–5. Platz played college football at California Polytechnic State University in San Luis Obispo, California in 1940. He later coach at Poway High School in San Diego County, California from 1961 to 1967.

== Head coaching record ==
=== College ===
Year	Team	Overall	Conference	Standing	Bowl/playoffs
San Diego Toreros (Independent) (1959)
1959	San Diego	1–5			
San Diego:		1–5			
Total:		1–5			
