= Penygraig =

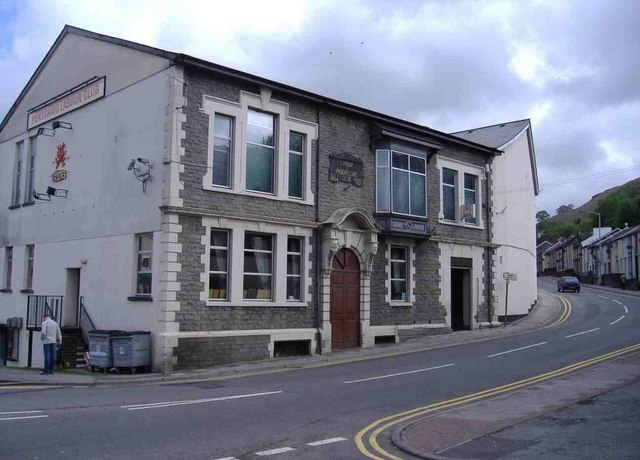
- Penygraig Labour Club

- Location within Rhondda Cynon Taf
- Population: 5,554 (2011)
- OS grid reference: SS995915
- Principal area: Rhondda Cynon Taf
- Preserved county: Mid Glamorgan
- Country: Wales
- Sovereign state: United Kingdom
- Post town: TONYPANDY
- Postcode district: CF40
- Dialling code: 01443
- Police: South Wales
- Fire: South Wales
- Ambulance: Welsh
- UK Parliament: Rhondda and Ogmore
- Senedd Cymru – Welsh Parliament: Rhondda
- List of places UK Wales Rhondda Cynon Taf 51.6133°N 3.4528°W Community map: Map of the community

Penygraig is a village and community in the Rhondda Valley in the county borough of Rhondda Cynon Taf, Wales. As a community Penygraig contains the neighbouring districts of Dinas, Edmondstown, Penrhiwfer and Williamstown. Penygraig is within the historic county boundaries of Glamorgan. The name Penygraig is Welsh for 'head of the rock'.

== Early history ==
The original settlement which is now Penygraig was called Ffrwd Amos, though as with the rest of the Rhondda before industrialisation the only settlements were farmsteads. In 1832, Soar, one of the first baptist chapels in the Rhondda was built at Penygraig by preacher David Williams. The only relic of industry before coal mining was the ruins of a small old blast furnace located behind the old Swan Hotel (later named The Jolly Collier), now demolished. It was called Ffrwn Amws (Amos Furnace House), later corrupted to Ffrwd Amos. The adjacent road today is called Amos Hill. In 1858, a drift mine was established below Penygraig Farm. The name of Penygraig settlement derives from the farm which is located on a small plateaux half way up the hillside (hence "Head of the Rock").

== Industrial Penygraig ==
Coal mining began in Penygraig in 1857 when Thomas Ellis sank a drift mine. In 1858 Moses Rowlands and Richard Jenkins discovered a seam at Penygraig and would later form the Penygraig Coal Company. The Company sank the first deep pit in the village, The Penygraig Colliery; after which the village would be named. After the Penygraig Colliery showed a successful profit the Naval Colliery Company opened a second deep pit, The Pandy, which reached the steam coal seam in 1879. The Pandy was then sold to the New Naval Colliery Company after three disasters, which then opened three more deep mines The Ely, the Nantgwyn and the Anthony Pits. The New Naval company would then become part of the Cambrian Combine, owned by Viscount Rhondda. The Ely Colliery would be the centre of the Cambrian Combine dispute, which in turn would lead to the Tonypandy Riot.

=== The Naval Colliery pit disasters ===
The first of three disasters to occur at the Naval Colliery happened on 4 December 1875 when a flood broke through into the mine, resulting in two miners drowning and the lives of many others placed at risk. Then on 10 December 1880 a gas explosion took the lives of 101 miners out of the 106 who were working in the mine at the time. This was followed on 27 January 1884 when another explosion led to the death of fourteen men. These disasters are likely factors in the Naval Colliery Company selling the mine in 1887.

== Governance ==
The Penygraig community is coterminous with the electoral ward of Pen-y-craig which elects two county councillors to Rhondda Cynon Taf County Borough Council. Since 1995 representation has mainly been either by the Labour Party or Plaid Cymru. Between 2004 and 2017 both councillors were from the Labour Party, though at the May 2017 election Plaid Cymru won both seats.

== Sport and leisure ==
Penygraig is home to rugby union team Penygraig RFC, which during the late 19th and early 20th century was one of the most notable rugby clubs in the Rhondda, producing Wales international players Dai Evans and Jack Rhapps, and was the early club of British Isles rugby representative Percy Bush.

== Notable people ==
See Category:People from Penygraig

Penygraig, like many of the villages of the Rhondda, also produced notable boxers, including Tom Thomas, who in 1908 became the first British national middle-weight champion, and in 1909 was the first winner of the Lonsdale Belt at the same weight.

- Thomas Cynfelyn Benjamin (1850–1925), Welsh language poet and congregational minister, spent his final years in Penygraig.
- Gwyn Martin, photographer and author, grew up in Penygraig.
- Leanne Wood, the former leader of Plaid Cymru, was born and still lives in Penygraig.
- Ricky Wright (ring announcer), Master of Ceremonies for professional boxing and Mixed Martial arts.
