= Russell Branyan =

American baseball player (born 1975)

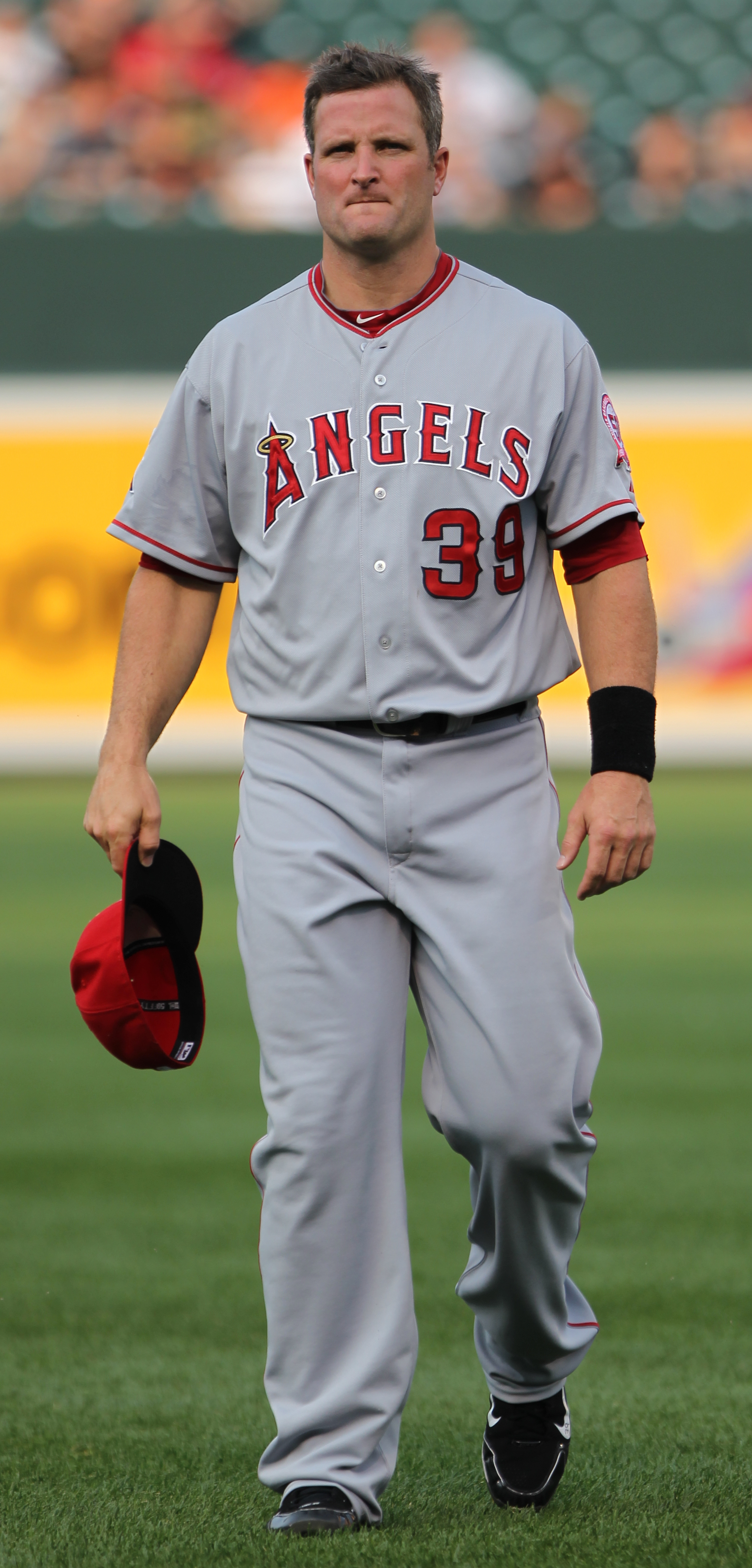
- Branyan with the Los Angeles Angels of Anaheim
- Third baseman / First baseman / Outfielder
- Born: December 19, 1975 (age 50); Warner Robins, Georgia, U.S.
- Batted: Left Threw: Right

MLB debut
- September 26, 1998, for the Cleveland Indians

Last MLB appearance
- September 26, 2011, for the Los Angeles Angels of Anaheim

MLB statistics
- Batting average: .232
- Home runs: 194
- Runs batted in: 467
- Stats at Baseball Reference

Teams
- Cleveland Indians (1998–2002); Cincinnati Reds (2002–2003); Milwaukee Brewers (2004–2005); Tampa Bay Devil Rays (2006); San Diego Padres (2006–2007); Philadelphia Phillies (2007); St. Louis Cardinals (2007); Milwaukee Brewers (2008); Seattle Mariners (2009); Cleveland Indians (2010); Seattle Mariners (2010); Arizona Diamondbacks (2011); Los Angeles Angels of Anaheim (2011)

Russell Oles Branyan (born December 19, 1975) is an American former professional baseball player in Major League Baseball (MLB) for the Cleveland Indians (two occasions), Cincinnati Reds, Milwaukee Brewers (two occasions), Tampa Bay Devil Rays, San Diego Padres, Philadelphia Phillies, St. Louis Cardinals, Seattle Mariners (two occasions), Arizona Diamondbacks, and Los Angeles Angels of Anaheim. While primarily a first baseman, Branyan was capable of playing third base and the outfield, as well. He batted left-handed and threw right-handed.

Branyan began his professional career in the Cleveland Indians minor league system. He made his big league debut with the Indians, on September 26, 1998, and was ranked the Indians' top prospect in 1999 by Baseball America. Though he demonstrated the ability to hit home runs with Cleveland, his batting average was low. Indians' manager Charlie Manuel suggested in 2002 that Branyan could benefit from more playing time, but he was traded to the Reds for prospect Ben Broussard during the season. Excited to have a "clean slate," as he put it, Branyan hit 16 home runs with the Reds in 2002 but struggled with injuries in the 2003 campaign. Allowed to become a free agent, he spent 2004 in the minor leagues for the Atlanta Braves and Cleveland before Milwaukee picked him up on July 26. In 51 games for the Brewers, Branyan hit 11 home runs. He competed with Wes Helms for the starting spot at third base in 2005 but again battled injuries much of the season. Branyan signed with the Devil Rays in 2006 and spent most of the year on their roster, but he expressed concern at the fact that he was not an everyday player with Tampa Bay. Traded to the Padres in August, he hit what was at the time the longest home run in Petco Park history, measured at 453 feet. He batted .197 for the Padres in 2007 and was released July 28. Branyan spent brief stints with the Phillies and Cardinals that season before becoming a free agent at the end of the year.

In 2008, Branyan split the season between Milwaukee and the minor leagues, hitting 12 home runs at both destinations while serving in a platoon role with Bill Hall in Milwaukee. With the Mariners in 2009, Branyan started doing eye exercises with an ophthalmologist. He attributed them to his most successful year in the major leagues thus far, when he hit a career-high 31 home runs while serving as an everyday player much of the season. Branyan signed with the Indians again in 2010. After starting the year on the disabled list, he hit 10 home runs for them before getting traded back to Seattle. With 15 home runs for the Mariners, Branyan finished the year with 25. He signed with the Diamondbacks in 2011, but only batted .197 with them and the Angels, with whom he finished the year. Branyan played in the minor leagues in 2012, did not play at all in 2013, and finished his career with time in the Mexican League and the Indians' system in 2014.

== Early life ==
Branyan was born December 19, 1975, in Warner Robins, Georgia. He graduated from Stratford Academy in 1994. Branyan was selected as an All-Georgia State baseball player in both 1993 and 1994. He was drafted out of Stratford Academy in the 1994 Major League Baseball draft by the Cleveland Indians in the seventh round (185th pick overall).

== Baseball career ==
=== Cleveland Indians ===
Branyan began his professional career with the rookie-level Burlington Indians of the Appalachian League in 1994. He batted .211 with 10 doubles, five home runs and 13 RBIs in 55 games. The next two seasons, 1995 and 1996, Branyan played with the Class-A Columbus RedStixx of the South Atlantic League. He was named the South Atlantic League Most Valuable Player in 1996 after he set a league record for most home runs in a single season, with 40. The previous record was held by Mike Simms who hit 39 home runs in 1987. He was second in home runs and ninth in RBIs (with 106) in all of minor league baseball in 1996. He was named the Indians' 1996 Minor League Player of the Year (receiving the Lou Boudreau Award).

In 1997, with both the Class-A Advanced Kinston Indians and the Double-A Akron Aeros, he led all minor league baseball in home runs with 39. In 1998 a strained tendon in his right wrist kept him on the disabled list for most of the season. In 1999 for the Triple-A Buffalo Bisons of the International League, he batted .208 and hit 30 home runs.

Branyan was first called up to the Cleveland Indians in 1998. In his major league debut on September 26, 1998, Branyan went 0-for-4. The next season, 1999, Branyan played 11 games with Cleveland, batting .211 with one home run and six RBIs. Branyan got his first hit (also his first home run) on July 23, 1999, off David Cone, a pitcher for the New York Yankees. In 2000, Branyan continued his struggles, hitting .238 with 16 homers. After the 1999 season, Baseball America named Branyan as the Indians top prospect. His home-run prowess caused USA Today to compare him with Mark McGwire. On June 1, 2000, he hit two home runs in one game, the first two home run game of his career. In 2001, an injury to Travis Fryman moved Branyan to third for a good part of the season. He again had a poor average, batting .232, with 20 home runs. In 2002, manager Charlie Manuel wanted Branyan to succeed Fryman full-time, though he was primarily used as a utility player throughout the season. Manuel stated that Branyan should be an everyday player saying, "He's definitely not a guy you want sitting on the bench, because of the timing in his swing." In spring training, Branyan was promised that he would be an everyday player. He hit .205 with just 8 homers before he was traded to Cincinnati for prospect Ben Broussard.

=== Cincinnati Reds ===
Branyan called the trade to Cincinnati "a clean slate" stating he had been branded as a home run or strikeout player in Cleveland. He improved his numbers after the trade, but they still remained poor as he played left field opposed to his normal position at third base that was occupied by Aaron Boone. On August 4, 2002, Branyan hit three home runs, two off Bobby J. Jones and one off Mike Holtz as the Reds beat the San Diego Padres. He also hit two home runs on September 27, both off Montreal Expos pitcher Javier Vázquez. He finished the 2002 season to hit a combined .228 with 24 home runs and 151 strikeouts between the Indians and Reds. Branyan was also praised for his improved fielding during his transition to the outfield. At season's end, Branyan played winter ball in the Dominican Republic where on November 18, he injured his shoulder. An examination with the team's physician discovered serious damage, and Branyan underwent arthroscopic surgery on this shoulder on December 3.

Branyan suffered through an injury-plagued season in 2003, appearing in 74 games, including 42 starts, for the Reds. He began the season on the disabled list, recovering from arthroscopic surgery. Branyan was reinstated from the disabled list on May 29. Branyan's shoulder was said to be at less than 100 percent but the Reds reinstated him despite his preference to undergo more rehab. On June 25, Branyan was fined an undisclosed amount after an in-game incident against the Chicago Cubs. During the seventh inning of that game, pitcher Paul Wilson hit outfielder Moisés Alou with a pitch, and during the bottom of the inning Cubs pitcher Kyle Farnsworth threw inside on Wilson during his at-bat which lead to a fight between Farnsworth and Wilson. Branyan, who was in the dugout, had to be restrained by teammates after a verbal altercation with Cubs first baseman Eric Karros during the fight between the two pitchers. His home run on June 7, against Toronto Blue Jays pitcher Jeff Tam, was his first of the season. It was also the 100th home run hit at the Great American Ball Park. His pinch-hit grand slam off Brooks Kieschnick on July 21 against Milwaukee was his first career pinch-hit home run and third career grand slam. He returned to the disabled list on August 13 with a right ankle sprain he obtained while sliding into the wall chasing a foul ball on hit by San Francisco Giants second baseman Ray Durham on August 1. After returning from the disabled list on August 28, he started 27 of the Reds' final 29 games of the season. Branyan finished the season with a .216 average, 12 doubles, nine home runs and 26 RBIs. His contract was not renewed at the end of the season.

=== Atlanta Braves and Cleveland Indians ===
On January 21, 2004 Branyan signed a minor league contract with an invitation to spring training with the Atlanta Braves. On March 25, Branyan was cut from spring training and assigned to the minor league camp. He began the 2004 season with the Richmond Braves, the Triple-A affiliate of the Braves. He was traded to the Cleveland Indians for a player to be named later on April 25 and was assigned to the Buffalo Bisons.

=== Milwaukee Brewers ===
==== 2004: Purchase from Cleveland ====
Branyan was traded to the Milwaukee Brewers on July 26, 2004, from Buffalo for future cash considerations. To make room for Branyan, the Brewers designated outfielder Chris Magruder for assignment. He made his Brewers debut in a ninth-inning pinch-hit appearance that evening. About the trade, Branyan said:

Step one is getting back to the big leagues. Step two is getting back in the lineup...It was fun down in Buffalo, but the opportunity to be back in the big leagues – I made a lot of improvements to my game.

— Russell Branyan, July 29, 2004.

On July 27, Branyan hit the longest home run in Miller Park history off Chicago Cubs pitcher Greg Maddux. The ball went an estimated 480-feet. On August 18, Branyan hit two home runs against the Chicago Cubs and drove in all five runs for the Brewers in a loss. Branyan went 3-for-4 in his second multi-home run game of season (ninth of his career) on September 12, against the Cincinnati Reds. Branyan hit .279 with 26 homers and 79 RBIs in 93 games at the Triple-A level in 2004, and posted a .234 batting average with 11 homers, and 27 RBIs in 51 games with the Brewers. He hit six home runs in his first 14 games with Milwaukee. He played 44 games at third base (40 starts), and two games at first base (one start). On December 21, the Brewers resigned Branyan, avoiding salary arbitration.

==== 2005: Return and success ====
Branyan returned to the Brewers in 2005 and went to spring training competing with Wes Helms for the starting spot at third base. He missed a month of the season, from June 2 to July 4, with a fractured middle finger on his left hand. Branyan went 5-for-17 in six rehab games with the Triple-A Nashville Sounds. After Branyan was activated from the disabled list, the Brewers optioned Prince Fielder to the minor leagues to make room for Branyan on the major league roster. Though he was off the disabled list, Branyan was still bothered by injuries throughout the rest of the season. By the end of the 2005 season, Branyan had played 59 games at third base, five at first base and three in left field. On the offensive side, Branyan batted .257 with 11 doubles, 12 home runs and 31 RBIs.

Branyan expressed interest in returning to the Brewers in 2006. He was re-signed by the Brewers on December 20, 2005 but after they acquired third baseman Corey Koskie from the Toronto Blue Jays, Branyan was designated for assignment. Branyan cleared waivers on January 18, and was released by the Brewers.

=== Tampa Bay Devil Rays ===
Branyan with the Devil Rays in 2006

Branyan signed a minor league contract with the Tampa Bay Devil Rays on January 31, 2006. He attended spring training that year and competed for a spot on the roster as a utility player. Branyan missed more than a week of spring training due to back spasms. He failed to make the 25-man roster out of spring training, and was sent to the Devil Rays' Triple-A affiliate, the Durham Bulls. He did not play in a game for the Bulls, however, as he was called up to Tampa Bay due to an injury to Luis Ordaz on Opening Day. On May 21, Branyan hit a walk-off home run against Florida Marlins' pitcher Logan Kensing. It was Branyan's first career walk-off home run. With the Devil Rays, he spent the majority of his playing time in right field. Branyan also expressed concerns with the fact he was not an everyday starter. In 64 games for the Devil Rays, Branyan batted .201 with 12 home runs, 10 doubles, and 27 RBIs.

=== San Diego Padres ===
==== 2006: Return to the National League ====
On August 24, 2006, Branyan was traded to the San Diego Padres for minor league pitchers Evan Meek and Dale Thayer. On the trade Branyan said:

I didn't sign over here to get traded, but to have a chance to go to the National League, I really enjoyed playing in the National League. To join a team that's in contention this late in the season, it will be real exciting.

— Russell Branyan, August 24, 2006.

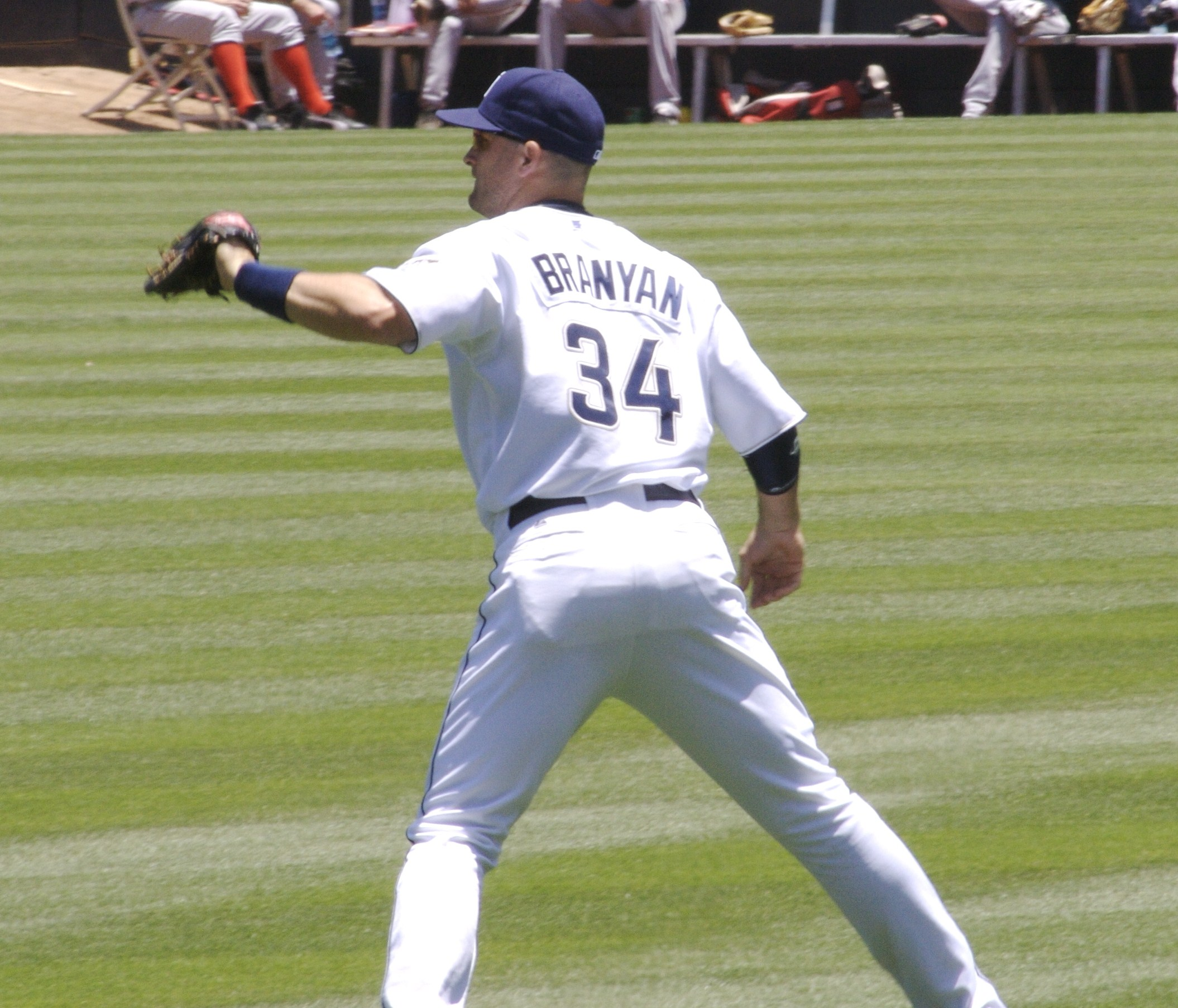
Branyan with the San Diego Padres

Branyan hit two home runs on August 29 against the Arizona Diamondbacks. The first home run in the seventh inning against Brandon Webb went an estimated 422 feet, and the second came in the ninth inning against Jorge Julio went an estimated 456 feet. Branyan hit his fifth home run as a member of the Padres on September 24, against the Pittsburgh Pirates. When recorded, it was the longest in Petco Park history, going an estimated 453 feet. He hit .292 for the Padres with 6 home runs, 9 RBIs, 14 runs scored and 15 walks. He compiled a .416 on-base percentage while slugging .556. He started at third base in 26 of San Diego's final 33 games and committed only 3 errors in 45 total chances. His 18 home runs overall in 2006 were the most he hit in a single season since 2002. At the end of the season it was speculated that Branyan would have a sure spot on the roster out of spring training. On October 30, Branyan's $1,000,000 option was picked up by the Padres.

==== 2007: Struggles and release ====
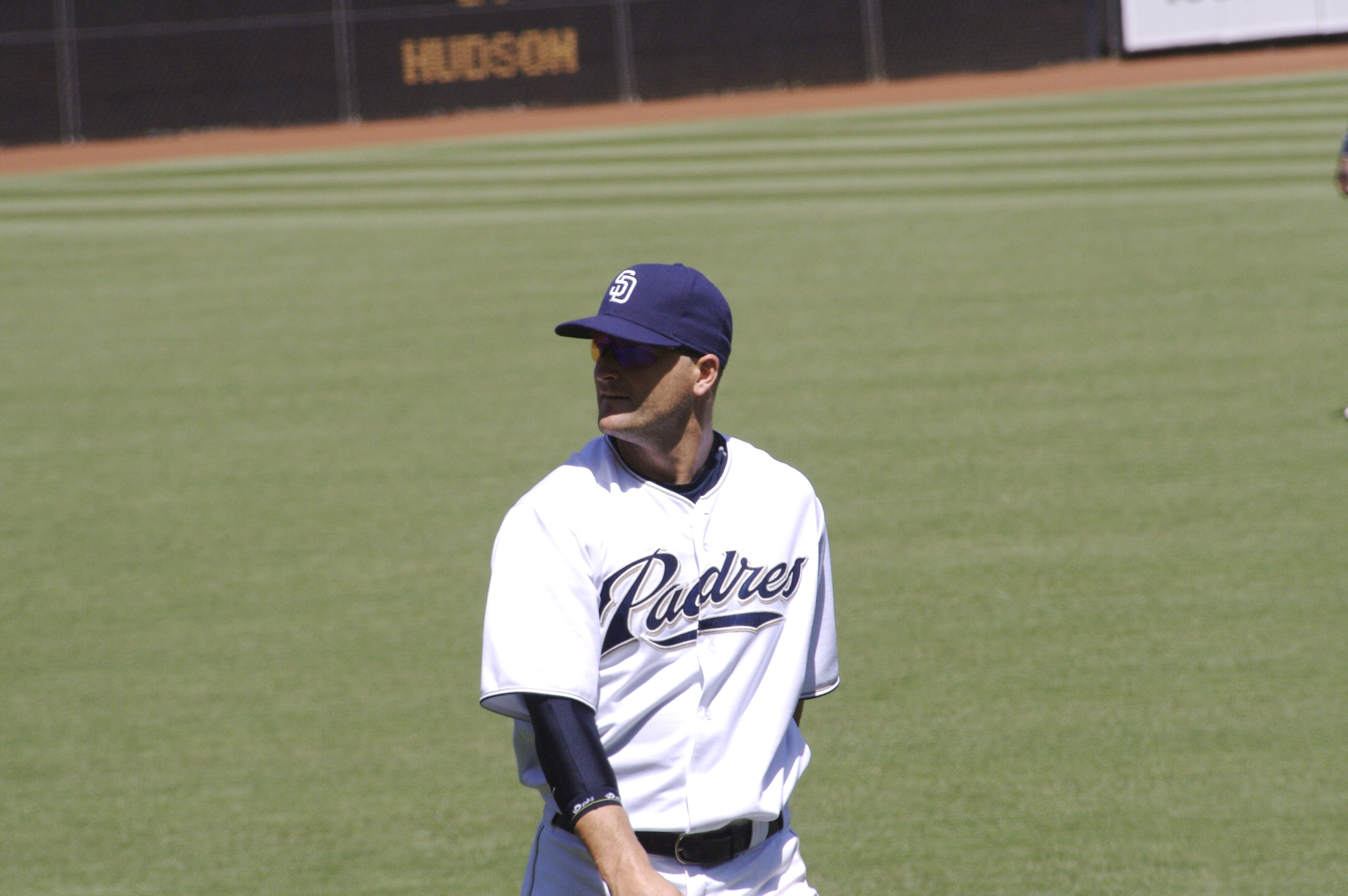
Branyan with the San Diego Padres in 2007

Going into spring training in 2007, newly acquired Kevin Kouzmanoff was slated for the job at third base. This left Branyan as a bench player going into the season. Branyan addressed the issues stating that he just wanted to play, no matter the circumstances. However, Branyan was seen as a good option if Kouzmanoff failed to produce at third base and at the plate. Branyan got off to a slow start out of spring training.

Branyan was placed on the bereavement list following the death of this father-in-law on April 27. This made room for catcher Josh Bard on the roster. He was activated on May 3 and the Padres sent Pete Laforest outright to the Triple-A Portland Beavers to make room for Branyan on the roster. On May 12, in a win over the St. Louis Cardinals, Branyan hit two home runs. The first was against Kip Wells, and the second against Brian Falkenborg. Branyan hit a go-ahead home run at Wrigley Field against the Chicago Cubs in a 1–0 win on June 16. In 2007, Branyan batted .197 with five doubles, one triple, seven home runs and 19 RBIs in 61 games for the Padres before his release on July 28. The release made room for Scott Hairston on the Padres' roster.

=== Cleveland Indians and Philadelphia Phillies ===
On August 6, 2007, Branyan signed a minor league contract with the Cleveland Indians. He played one game with their Triple-A affiliate, the Buffalo Bisons. On August 9, Branyan was placed on waivers and traded to the Philadelphia Phillies for cash considerations. On August 14, in his first at-bat with the Phillies, Branyan hit a two-run home run against the Washington Nationals, putting the Phillies ahead in the game 3–2.

=== St. Louis Cardinals ===
On August 28, Branyan was designated for assignment by the Phillies. On August 31, he was traded to the St. Louis Cardinals for a player to be named later. During his tenure in St. Louis, Branyan filled in for Scott Rolen, the Cardinals' regular starting third baseman. In 21 games (32 at bats), he batted .188 with one home run and two RBIs. In a combined 89 games between San Diego, Philadelphia, and St. Louis, his totals were a .196 batting average, 10 home runs, and 26 RBI. At the end of the season, Branyan filed for free agency.

=== Milwaukee Brewers, second tenure ===
On February 20, 2008, Branyan signed a minor league contract with the Brewers. Branyan began the season with the Brewers' Triple-A affiliate, the Nashville Sounds. On May 25, his contract was purchased by the Brewers, and he was added to the active roster. To make room on the roster, the Brewers sent Tony Gwynn Jr. to Triple-A Nashville. About the call-up, Branyan said,

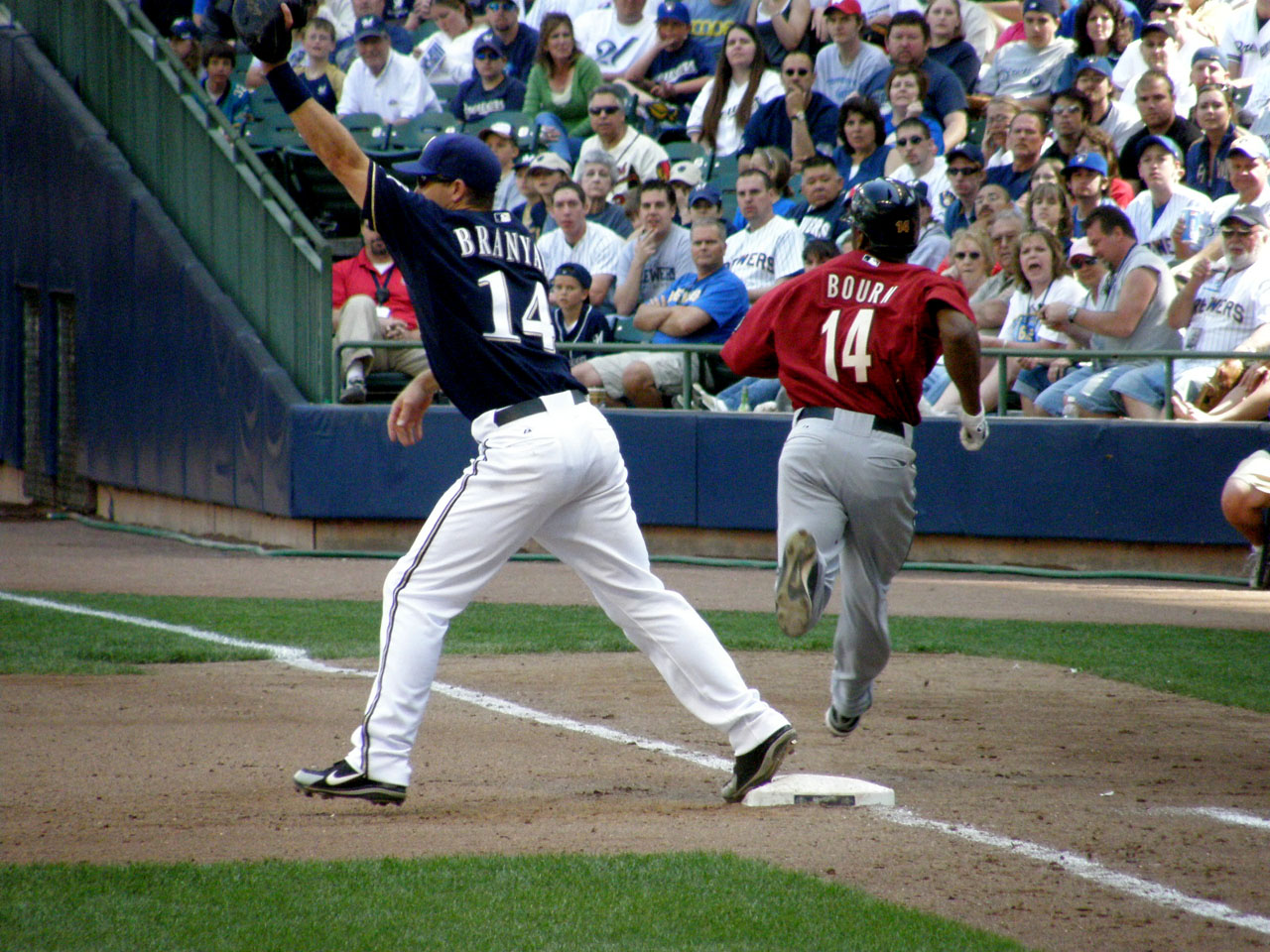
Branyan covers first base on June 1, 2008, against the Astros

I know how this game is, I know I could have come up and landed flat on my face, then been back in the situation I've always been in, sitting on the bench and wondering when I'm going to play again. I'm fortunate to have been able to come up swinging the bat well in Triple-A and continue it here.

— Russell Branyan, June 28, 2008

Branyan began the season playing a platoon role with teammate Bill Hall. Hall did not like the shared role, feeling that he should be playing full-time. Branyan expressed no problem with the platoon role, but stated that he understood why Hall disliked the situation. Branyan started the season earning praise from manager Ned Yost and soon saw increased playing time. Later in the season, however, Branyan's playing time was decreased.

He was placed on the 15-day disabled list on August 12 with a right oblique strain. Branyan rehabilitated at the Brewers' spring training facility, and was reinstated on September 23. On May 31, shortly after his return to the majors, he hit a 465-foot home run into the "Dew Deck" in the right-field bleachers of the stadium, helping the Brewers to a 4–1 win. Branyan finished the season with 12 home runs, and 20 RBIs in 132 at-bats. He appeared in 50 games with the Brewers, including 35 starts; 33 at third base, and 2 at first base. He became the first player in franchise history to hit 10 home runs while playing 20 or fewer games in a season. He batted .455 with two homers as a pinch hitter.

=== Seattle Mariners ===
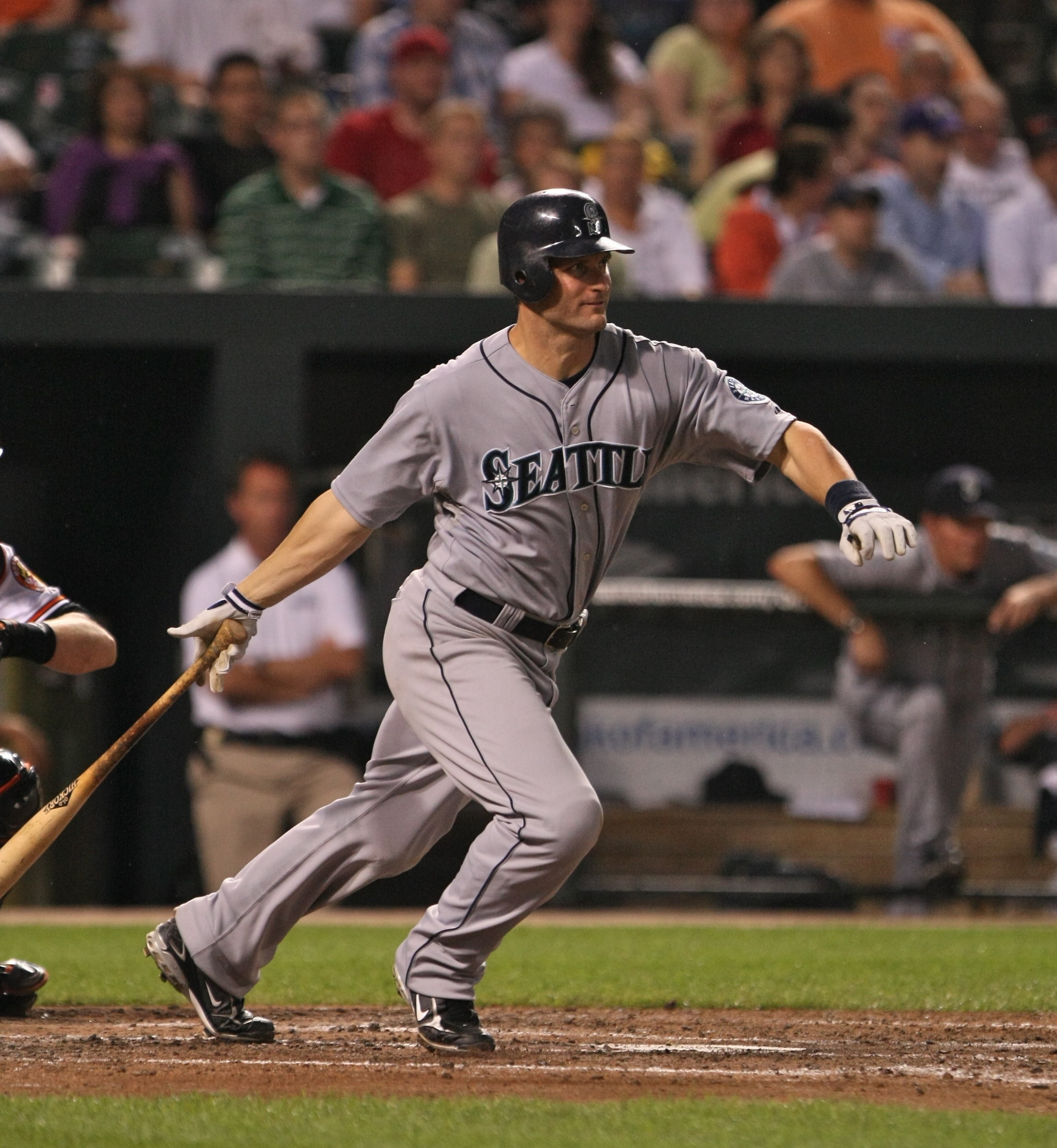
Branyan at-bat for the Mariners in 2009

Branyan signed a one-year contract with the Seattle Mariners on December 3, 2008. The Mariners gave him the starting first base job before spring training. At the end of the 2009 season, Branyan was the team leader in home runs. Branyan stated one of the keys to his success with the Mariners was a vision training program with Chicago ophthalmologist Dr. Barry Seiller. The exercises strengthen eye muscles and improve focus at the plate. The program was similar to the one designated hitter (DH) Edgar Martínez used when he played for the Mariners. Branyan hit his 25th home run of the year on August 7, setting a new career high. His previous career-high of 24 had been achieved during the 2002 season. He also set career records in RBIs, doubles, hits, runs and total bases in the 2009 season.

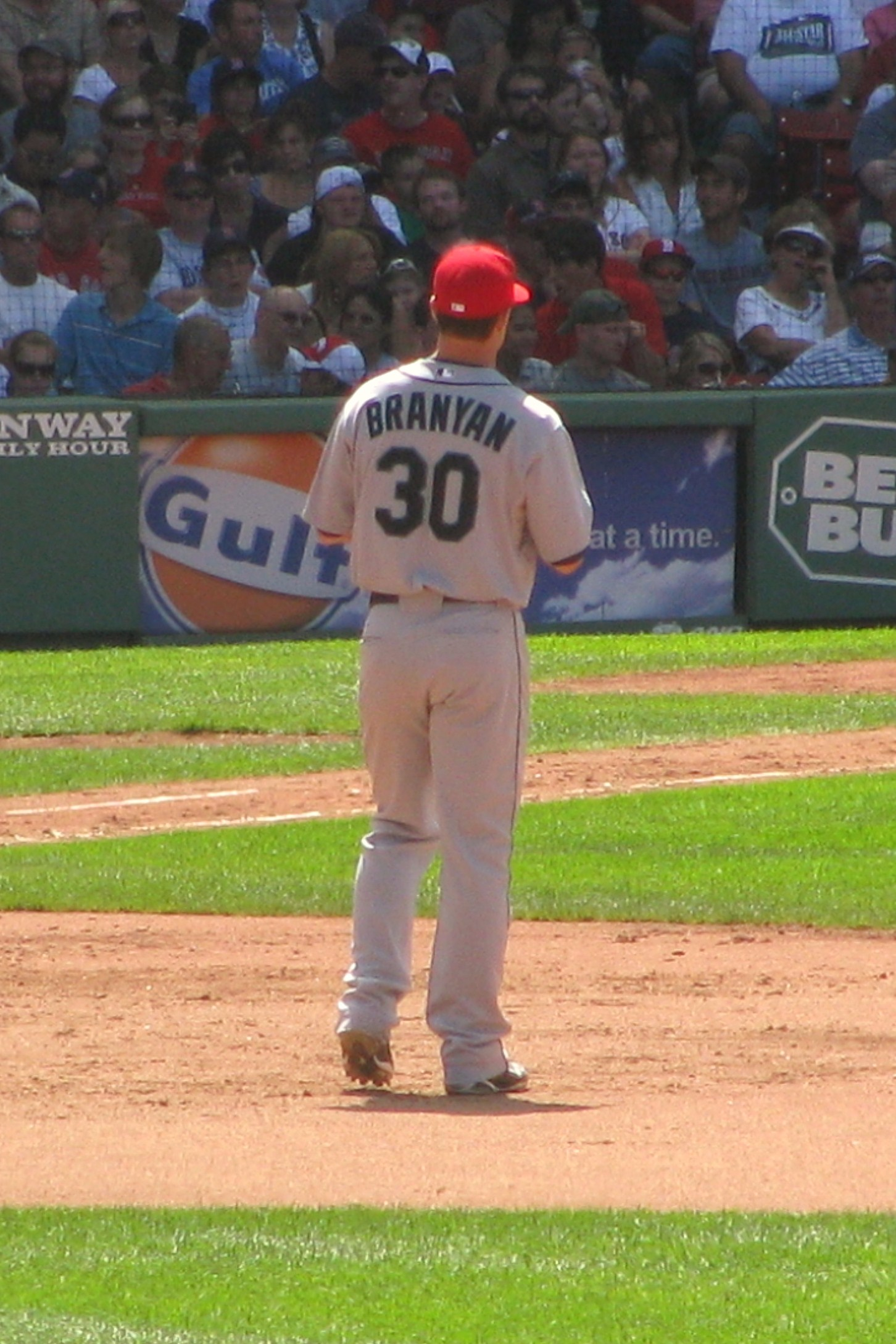
Russell Branyan taking the field on July 7, 2009

On August 9, 2009, Branyan hit a grand slam in the bottom of the sixth inning, this was his first hit in eleven at-bats and his fourth career grand slam. Branyan was often placed in the number two spot in the batting order in 2009 compared to the fourth spot, where managers typically put power hitters. The reason for this was because Branyan expressed discomfort with the cleanup role because of the excessive work load.

==== Herniated disk ====
Branyan was placed on the disabled list on August 30, with a herniated disk in his back. He had stated that he had been bothered by lower back spasms throughout the season. He left the game against the Kansas City Royals after experiencing pain on a swing and underwent an MRI the next day. On September 27 the Mariners' manager Don Wakamatsu acknowledged it was unlikely that Branyan would be rejoining the Mariners in 2009. Branyan said on September 15 there might be a possibility of him playing before the end of the season.

My goal is to get back on the field with the team, because I started the season with the ballclub as a starting player, and I want to finish that way.

— Russell Branyan, September 15, 2009.

He was activated from the disabled list on September 30 but did not appear in any more games. However, the season still wound up being the best of his career. He finished 2009 with a .251 batting average, 31 home runs, 21 doubles, one triple, 108 hits, 224 total bases in 116 games. On the defensive side, he had a .990 fielding percentage with 10 errors (tied for most in the league for a first baseman) in 116 games at first base, all starts.

==== 2009–2010: Free agency ====
"'I really loved it [in Seattle],' Branyan said by telephone from Fort Lauderdale, Fla., where he's visiting friends and working out. 'I really had a great time. It was a great situation there. I really felt comfortable. I would have loved to come back, but right now it doesn't look like that's going to happen.'"

— The Seattle Times: January 13, 2010

On November 5, 2009, it was reported that Branyan had shown interest in returning for the Mariners in 2010. There was no comment from Mariners general manager Jack Zduriencik, but on the possible return, Branyan said:

I talked briefly with Jack [Zduriencik] at the end of the season, and he knows how passionate I am about going back to Seattle. Now, it's a matter of getting on the phone and figuring out what we can do to get me back in a Seattle uniform.

— Russell Branyan, November 5, 2009.

Branyan rejected a one-year offer from the Mariners on November 10. He stated that the reason for the decline was because he wanted a contract that lasted for more than one year, possibly a two or three-year contract. Branyan also stated that he still wanted to return to Seattle, but would rather test the free agent market than settle for anything less than a two-year contract. On January 7, 2010, the Seattle Mariners traded infielder Bill Hall for first baseman Casey Kotchman. For Branyan, this meant it was unlikely the Mariners would offer him a new contract as Kotchman would be the likely candidate for the starting job at first base, vacated by Branyan. On February 9, Foxsports.com reported that Branyan has drawn interest from both the Cleveland Indians, and the Toronto Blue Jays. It was reported by Foxsports.com on February 16, that Tampa Bay, Cleveland, and the Boston Red Sox were interested in signing Branyan. That day, the Indians offered Branyan a one-year major league contract, according to MLB.com. On February 17, it was reported by Foxsports.com that the Red Sox were no longer interested in Branyan.

=== Return to the Cleveland Indians ===
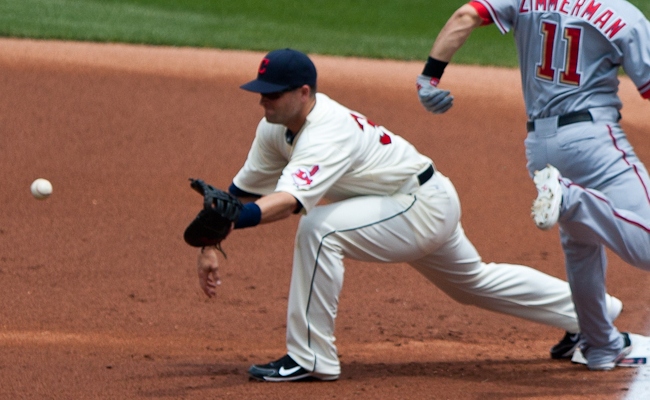
Branyan with the Indians in 2010

On February 19, 2010, Branyan accepted a one-year, $2 million contract with a $5 million option for 2011 from the Cleveland Indians. The back injury he had dealt with last year kept him on the disabled list until April 20. Manager Manny Acta stated that he only wanted to use Branyan for four games a week upon his return to give him some off days to continue to recover, but by May 9 he was playing nearly every game at first base. After not hitting a home run in his first 12 games, he hit two against the Royals on May 11, one against Brian Bannister in the second inning and another against Joakim Soria in the ninth inning of an 8–2 victory over Kansas City. On June 10, he came up to bat in the bottom of the ninth, with the Indians trailing the Red Sox 7–6 with two outs. He had a two-RBI single against Daniel Bard to give the Indians an 8–7 walk-off win. He batted .263 in his first 52 games with the Indians, with 10 home runs and 24 RBI.

=== Seattle Mariners, second tenure ===
Branyan was traded back to Seattle for minor leaguers Ezequiel Carrera and Juan Díaz on June 26, 2010. He was used as Seattle's DH. On July 5, he had another home run against Bannister and the Royals, but the Mariners lost this game 6–4 in 10 innings. That month, he missed several games after a table in a hotel room fell on his toe. As he had on May 11, he hit two home runs on August 20, a three-run blast and a solo shot against A. J. Burnett in a 6–0 win over the Yankees. The next day, he became the first batter at the new Yankee Stadium to hit a home run into the fourth-deck with a first-inning blast against Vázquez in a 9–5 Mariner loss. He suffered another odd injury at a pizza parlor with his family in September. Bending down to pick up his son's flip-flop, Branyan fell off his chair, injuring his tailbone. That injury kept him from playing after September 15. In 57 games with Seattle, Branyan batted .215, 48 points lower than he had with Cleveland. However, in five more games with Seattle, Branyan hit 15 home runs. His total of 25 was the second-highest of his career.

=== Arizona Diamondbacks and Los Angeles Angels of Anaheim ===
On February 16, 2011, Branyan signed a minor league contract with the Arizona Diamondbacks with an invitation to Spring training. He made the Diamondbacks' Opening Day roster and was used primarily as a pinch-hitter and backup first baseman. Branyan batted .421 in his first 11 games but followed that with just five hits in his next 43 at bats. To clear up the three-way traffic jam at first base with Juan Miranda and Xavier Nady, Branyan was released on May 21, 2011. Micah Owings was called up to take his spot.

Branyan did not stay unemployed for long, signing with the Los Angeles Angels of Anaheim five days after his release. With the Angels, he was used as a pinch-hitter, DH, and first baseman. On July 3, his two-run home run against Chad Billingsley gave the Angels a 3–1 victory over the Dodgers. His final major league game came on September 26, when he pinch-hit for Bobby Wilson in a game against the Rangers. Neftalí Feliz struck him out looking as the Angels lost 4–3. He only hit four home runs in 37 games for the Angels, batting .185. In a combined 68 games with Arizona and Los Angeles, he batted .197 with five home runs and 14 RBI. After the season, he became a free agent.

=== Final seasons ===
In 2012, Branyan signed a minor league contract with the New York Yankees with an invitation to spring training. Failing to make the team, he was assigned to the Scranton/Wilkes-Barre Yankees of the International League. He batted .309 with 11 home runs in 33 games and spent the greater part of the season on the DL with back issues. The Yankees released him on August 10, and Branyan went unsigned for the rest of the year.

After not playing in 2013, Branyan started 2014 with the Toros de Tijuana of the Mexican League. He signed a minor league deal with the Indians on August 29, 2014, but Fox Sports reported that he was only being used to fill a roster spot with the Columbus Clippers, who were in an International League playoff race. Branyan batted .333 in four games, but Columbus was eliminated by the Bulls in the first round of the playoffs. He had a seventh-inning RBI in the final game of the series but was subsequently thrown out trying to stretch a single into a double.

Following the 2014 season, Branyan played 19 games for the Tomateros de Culiacan of the Mexican Pacific Winter League and four games for Mexico in the Caribbean Series. He has not played professionally since.

== Personal life ==
Branyan has four children: daughters Kylie, Quinn and Blake, and son Cash. Cash was named after Johnny Cash, of whom Branyan is a fan.

On January 31, 2008, Branyan was arrested for allegedly assaulting his then wife, Jill. According to police accounts, officers were called to a parking lot of a police station after an officer found Jill Branyan sitting alone in her car, crying. The couple had gone to The Cowboy restaurant in Bainbridge, Ohio and reportedly argued on the way home. At some point, Russell Branyan, who was driving, allegedly put his hand on Jill's face, causing her to have a cut lip. The force of the grab caused her to develop a swollen lip and some bleeding. When the couple entered their home, Jill's mother saw the injury and said that Jill and the children should go with her to her house.

Branyan entered a "not guilty" plea in Shaker Heights Municipal Court on February 5, 2008, charged with one count of domestic violence. Branyan's attorney, Philip Kushner, and Pepper Pike prosecutor Jonathan D. Greenberg agreed to a temporary protection order prohibiting Branyan from being within 500 feet of his wife or children. Branyan ultimately entered a no contest plea and, after completing a diversion program, the charges were dismissed.

Branyan was later arrested for breaking into his ex-wife Jill's home while she slept on the evening of October 30, 2015. Branyan allegedly removed several items and "tampered with the thermostat inside of the home, making it extremely cold," before leaving the property. He was charged with felony aggravated burglary in November 2015. On January 7, 2016, Branyan pled guilty to a lesser charge of attempted aggravated criminal trespass and was sentenced to six months of probation and a $1000 fine.

Branyan was arrested on September 12, 2020, for aggravated assault of his girlfriend. A warrant from the incident alleged he smashed his girlfriend's phone, then grabbed her by the back of the neck, strangling her. He was once again arrested on October 17, 2020, on charges of aggravated stalking and violation of bail conditions. Branyan ultimately reached a plea agreement under which he pled to reckless endangerment and was sentenced to one year of probation with domestic violence counseling and random drug tests.

Awards and achievements
Preceded by Richie Sexson	Indians' Minor League Player of the Year (the Lou Boudreau Award); 1996	Succeeded by Sean Casey
