= Ben Broussard (album) =

Studio album by Ben Broussard
- Released: 2005
- Genre: Rock
- Length: 45:28
- Label: Lazy Bones Recordings

Ben Broussard chronology
Ben Broussard (2005)	Renovated (2009)

Ben Broussard is the first studio album by the American rock artist Ben Broussard.

"Hold on to Me" and "Again" were featured in 2005 episodes of A&E's series Dog The Bounty Hunter.

His songs "105" and "Hold on to Me" were featured in episodes of South of Nowhere, a TV series on Noggin's teen block "The N". "Deep", another of his songs, was used in a commercial advertising the show.

== Track listing ==
1. I Hate Goodbyes
2. Take It All Back
3. Again
4. 105
5. Three
6. I Know It Will
7. Hold On To Me
8. Deep
9. Decision
10. Children
11. Hitting The Ground
12. The Day
