= Anisha Nicole =

American singer

- Also known as: Nee-Nee Gwynn
- Born: Anisha Nicole Gwynn; August 8, 1985 (age 41); San Diego, California, United States
- Genres: R&B, hip hop, pop
- Occupation: Singer
- Instrument: Vocals
- Years active: 2003–present
- Label: Base Hit Records

Anisha Nicole Gwynn (born August 8, 1985), better known by the stage names Anisha Nicole and Nee-Nee Gwynn, is an R&B, hip hop, and pop singer.

Gwynn's single "No Means No", as Nee-Nee Gwynn featuring Baby Diva, entered the Billboard charts on February 22, 2002, staying on the Hot R&B/Hip-Hop Singles Sales chart for 19 weeks, reaching #4 April 5. The single was on the Hot 100 Singles Sales chart for 19 weeks, reaching #18, also on April 5. On the Billboard Hot R&B/Hip-Hop Songs chart, the single peaked at #89 on March 8, 2003. In 2005, Gwynn released her first album, 19, on her mother's recording label, Base Hit Records. Her father, Tony Gwynn, wore number 19 for the San Diego Padres.

== Personal life ==
Gwynn is a graduate of Poway High School (2003). She attended California State University, Northridge (CSUN) before she decided to pursue her musical career full-time.

Gwynn married baseball player Kennard Jones on January 31, 2009.

Gwynn is the daughter of Major League Baseball Hall of Famer Tony Gwynn, who played his entire 20-year career for the San Diego Padres and was the head baseball coach for San Diego State University following his retirement from the Padres. Her mother is Alicia Gwynn. Her brother, Tony Gwynn Jr., is a former major league outfielder and current analyst for the Padres. Her uncle is former Major League Baseball player Chris Gwynn.
