= Max Tyler =

American politician

Member of the Colorado House of Representatives from the 23rd district
- In office June 4, 2009 – January 11, 2017
- Preceded by: Gwyn Green
- Succeeded by: Chris Kennedy

Personal details
- Born: November 17, 1947 (age 78)
- Party: Democratic

Max Tyler (born November 17, 1947) is a small business owner and former legislator from Lakewood, Colorado. A Democrat, he was a member of the Colorado House of Representatives in 2010 after being appointed in May 2009 following the resignation of Gwyn Green and subsequently elected to the post. Term-limited, he completed his final term in January 2017. He represented the 23rd district, which covers half of Golden, Applewood, and Lakewood within Jefferson County. The district boundaries changed with the decennial reapportionment in 2011, and the new House District 23 includes north and west Lakewood.

== Biography ==
Tyler was the chairman of the Transportation and Energy Committee and the Joint Technology Committee, which he created during the 2013 legislative session.

He also served on the Appropriations and Public Health Care and Human Services Committee. During the interim, Tyler served as the vice-chair of the Transportation Legislation Review Committee.

Tyler has sponsored many bills, such as 'Promoting Affordable Housing', 'Colorado State Patrol Roadside Memorials', and the 'Fund Safe Routes to School Program'.

Tyler served on the board of directors of the Denver Chamber of Commerce. He has founded three businesses focused on graphic design, computer network support and helping small businesses use their technological resources more efficiently.

== Legislative career ==
=== 2009 appointment ===
When Gwyn Green announced her resignation from the legislature in April 2009, she suggested Tyler as one of several possible successors. A vacancy committee, composed of Democratic Party precinct officers and local elected officials, was convened to choose a replacement on May 27, 2009, and selected Tyler. Tyler was sworn in as a member of the state legislature on June 4, 2009.

=== 2010 legislative Session ===
Tyler was assigned by Speaker of the House Terrance Carroll to serve on the Interim Committee on Hospice and Palliative Care in late 2009, where he worked with members of both parties on bills that would be introduced the following January for the 2010 session. Tyler served on the House Committee on Transportation and Energy and the House Committee on Health and Human Services.

In 2010, Tyler helped to pass House Bill 1001, which increased Colorado’s renewable energy standard from 20% to 30% by 2020 and encouraged more investment in distributed generation systems. Tyler also sponsored House Bill 1211, which reduced late vehicle registration fees.

Beginning in 2009, Tyler hosted monthly town hall meetings in both Golden and Lakewood to share information about legislation with his constituents and listen to their feedback. He also hosted a number of coffees with his constituents, sent a regular email newsletter, and conducted several surveys to understand the priorities of the people in House District 23.

=== 2010 election ===
In the 2010 election in House District 23, Tyler defeated Republican challenger Edgar Johansson 53% to 47%. Tyler was sworn into his first full term in the Colorado House of Representatives in January 2011.

=== 2011 legislative session ===
In January 2011, Tyler was assigned by Minority Leader Sal Pace to serve on the House Committee on Transportation and the House Committee on Economic and Business Development (both renamed by the new Republican majority). He was the ranking Democratic member on the Transportation Committee. In both 2011 and 2012, he attempted to pass bills to fund Colorado’s system of small business development centers, but the bills were defeated in committees with Republican majorities.

In 2011, Tyler was successful in passing House Bill 1212, which required government agencies to include LEAN government principles in the performance-based budgeting process. The bill was signed by Governor John Hickenlooper on May 13, 2011.

=== 2012 legislative session ===
In 2012, Tyler attempted to fund small business development centers across the state and a bill to establish a regulator navigator to help businesses understand and work with various state and local regulations.

=== 2012 election ===
In the 2012 General Election, Tyler faced Republican challenger Rick Enstrom. Tyler was reelected by a margin of 50% to 44% with libertarian candidate Michael M. Beckerman receiving the remainder of the vote.

=== 2013 legislative session ===
Tyler was appointed by Speaker of the House Mark Ferrandino as the Chair of the House Transportation and Energy Committee for the 2013 legislative session. He also sponsored legislation investing $300,000 in Colorado's small business development centers.

=== 2014 legislative session ===
Tyler sponsored legislation to encourage more investment in Colorado's growing advanced industries and a bill to reduce the number of waste tires across the state. He supported renewable energy and sponsored legislation to encourage more solar gardens and increase energy efficiency schools.
