= Gwyn Hughes =

Gwyn Hughes may refer to:

- Gwyn Hughes (cricketer) (born 1941), Welsh cricketer
- Gwyn Hughes (footballer) (1922–1999), Welsh footballer
