= Ramey Johnson =

American politician

Member of the Colorado House of Representatives from the 23rd district
- In office January 8, 2003 – January 12, 2005
- Preceded by: Kelley Daniel
- Succeeded by: Gwyn Green

Personal details
- Born: October 11, 1946 (age 79) Chicago, Illinois
- Party: Republican

Ramey Johnson (born October 11, 1946) is an American politician who served in the Colorado House of Representatives from the 23rd district from 2003 to 2005.
