= Ben Broussard =

American baseball player (born 1976)

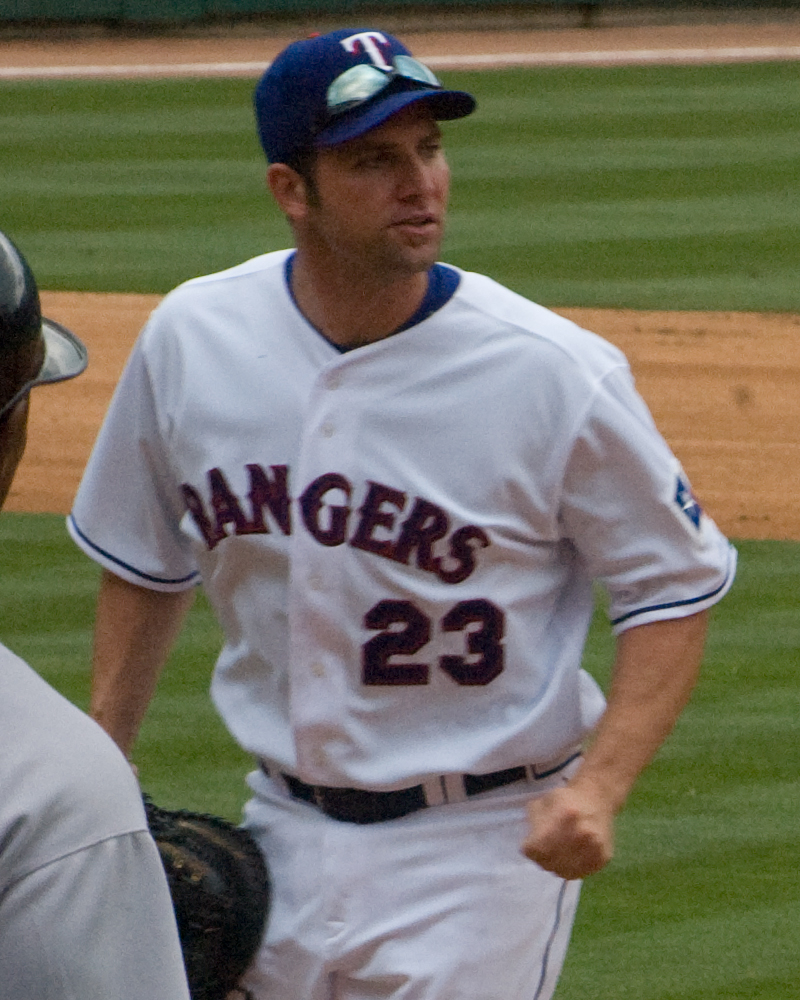
- Broussard with the Texas Rangers
- First baseman
- Born: September 24, 1976 (age 49); Beaumont, Texas, U.S.
- Batted: Left Threw: Left

MLB debut
- June 22, 2002, for the Cleveland Indians

Last MLB appearance
- May 2, 2008, for the Texas Rangers

MLB statistics
- Batting average: .263
- Home runs: 87
- Runs batted in: 314
- Stats at Baseball Reference

Teams
- Cleveland Indians (2002–2006); Seattle Mariners (2006–2007); Texas Rangers (2008)
Medals
Men's baseball
Representing United States
Baseball World Cup
| Silver medal – second place | 2001 Taipei | National team |

Benjamin Isaac Broussard (born September 24, 1976) is an American former professional baseball first baseman. He is currently a musician and occasional pregame and postgame analyst for the Cleveland Guardians of Major League Baseball. Broussard was drafted by the Cincinnati Reds in the second round of the 1999 Major League Baseball draft. During a 7-year baseball career, he played from 2002 to 2008 for the Cleveland Indians, Seattle Mariners, and the Texas Rangers.

Broussard has released two full-length music albums. The first, his self-titled album, was released in 2005. The second, Renovated, was released in 2009. He was also featured on the album, Oh Say Can You Sing?, a compilation of different Major League Baseball players singing their favorite songs. On that album Broussard sang U2's "With or Without You". He is now a full-time musician.

== Early life ==
Broussard was born in Beaumont, Texas and graduated from Hardin-Jefferson High School in Sour Lake, Texas in 1995. He played college baseball at McNeese State University in Lake Charles, Louisiana.

== Professional career ==
=== Cincinnati Reds ===
Broussard was drafted by the Cincinnati Reds in the second round of the 1999 Major League Baseball draft. He was a Pioneer League All-Star in his first professional season, winning the league batting crown with a .407 average. He was named Pioneer League Player of the Week for July 12–18 and in his first professional season he made the jump from Rookie-league to Double-A. With the Billings Mustangs, Clinton LumberKings and Chattanooga Lookouts Broussard combined to hit .332 with 24 home runs and 75 RBIs. He was among ranked second in hitting and tied for third in home runs in the Reds Minor Leagues. He began his professional career by reaching base safely in each of his first 44 games, three short of the all-time record held by Alvin Davis. When Broussard was promoted to Clinton he was leading the Pioneer League in home runs, on-base percentage, slugging percentage, hits and extra-base hits and was second in batting and RBIs. He was named to the Baseball America Short-Season All-Star Team. Broussard appeared in only five games at Clinton before he was promoted to Chattanooga on July 31. For the Lookouts Broussard recorded eight home runs and 21 RBIs in just 35 games. Following the season Broussard almost won the California Fall League's Triple Crown by hitting .387 with nine home runs and 34 RBIs for San Bernardino finishing second in hitting. Combined on the year he appeared in 53 games in the outfield and 24 at first base.

In 2000 Broussard was selected to the Southern League All-Star team but was sidelined with a broken right wrist. He ranked tied for fourth in the Southern League with 72 walks. On May 9 Broussard suffered a broken right wrist while sliding for a ball. Prior to the injury ranked second in the Southern League in hitting, batting a .353 clip. He returned to the Lookouts on June 29 and the rest of the season hit only .214. In the 2–1 victory on June 29 Broussard scored the winning run by stealing home. He appeared in 70 games in the outfield and 15 at first base. He appeared in 17 games for Grand Canyon in the Arizona Fall League.

Broussard split the 2001 season between the Class-A Mudville Nine and Double-A Chattanooga, combining to hit .303 with 28 home runs and 90 RBIs. At Chattanooga he hit .320 to win the Southern League batting championship. Broussard also led the SL in slugging percentage, ranked second in on-base percentage and ranked fifth in home runs and was a Topps Double-A All-Star. Among all Reds minor leaguers he ranked tied for second in home runs, fourth in RBIs and fifth in hitting. He was named Southern League Batter of the Week three times and on the year appeared in 123 games at first base and three in the outfield. He was a member of Team USA that won a silver medal in the 2001 Baseball World Cup in Taiwan along with Josh Bard and Jason Stanford. Broussard also played for Pollos in the Dominican Winter League. On November 6 he was added to the Reds' 40-man roster.

He began the 2002 season with the Triple-A Louisville Bats, hitting .295 in April with four home runs and 18 RBIs in 24 games. He was named the Cincinnati organization's best hitter for average and sixth-best prospect by Baseball America entering the 2002 season. On June 7, 2002, the Reds traded Broussard to the Cleveland Indians for Russell Branyan.

=== Cleveland Indians ===
He split the remainder of the 2002 season between the Triple-A Buffalo Bisons and the big leagues with Cleveland. After being acquired he was assigned to the Triple-A Buffalo Bisons where he appeared in 14 games before being recalled to Cleveland on June 22 when Todd Dunwoody was placed on the disabled list. He made his Major League debut that night in a pinch-hitting appearance against the Montreal Expos and made his first start in left field on June 23 at Montreal, notching his first hit in the second inning off Tony Armas Jr. Broussard hit his first home run on June 26 at Boston off Pedro Martínez. Broussard said this about his first home run:

My favorite moment would be my first home run ... That moment, it made it all real to me that I'm competing here.

He appeared in 31 games with Cleveland from before being optioned back to Buffalo on August 8. He was recalled for second time after the conclusion of the Triple-A playoffs and appeared in 8 games in September, going 5 for 18 with a home run and two RBI. On the year with Cleveland he made 29 starts in left field and 3 starts at first base.

Broussard spent most of the 2003 season in the Major Leagues with Cleveland and teamed with Travis Hafner in the second half to solidify the first base position. He began the season on the 15-day disabled list after straining his right oblique muscle on March 14. After a short rehab assignment in Triple-A, Broussard was activated from the disabled list and optioned to Triple-A. He was recalled from on April 13 and made his '03 debut against Seattle. He hit his first home run of the season off of Freddy García. Broussard finished eighth among American League rookies in runs scored with 53, tenth in on-base percentage with .312, 6th in slugging percentage with .443 and tied for seventh in home runs with 16 along with New York's Hideki Matsui.

In 2004 Broussard had a solid offensive season after getting off to a slow start to begin the campaign. He finished fourth on the team with a career-high 80 RBIs in just 415 at-bats. He led all American League hitters in RBIs among those with 425 at-bats or less, only Barry Bonds and Jason Bay had more in the Major Leagues. Broussard also became just the fourth player in Major League baseball history and the first since Darryl Strawberry in 1998 to hit two pinch-hit grand slams in the same season. On the year he hit three grand slams which equaled the AL lead with Hank Blalock & Rubén Sierra. On the year he hit .636 with the bases loaded with three home runs and 23 RBIs. He appeared in 133 games at first base, making 107 starts. He finished eighth among AL first basemen in fielding percentage at .994.

Broussard patrolled first base for most of the 2005 season as he was again Eric Wedge's first baseman against right-handed pitchers. He had an inconsistent offensive season, but came on over the last six weeks of the season to post a career-high 19 homers in 142 games. On the year he made 112 starts at first base and two starts at the designated hitter spot. At first base he compiled a fielding percentage of .992 in 138 games at first base, the seventh best mark among league first basemen.

=== Seattle Mariners ===
Broussard went on to have a successful stint with the Indians, and was traded to the Seattle Mariners on July 26, 2006, for outfielder Shin-Soo Choo and a player to be named later (who turned out to be minor leaguer Shawn Nottingham). Broussard hit his career-best 20th home run of the season on September 10. He had four hits for the third time of the season in that game. The other two times came when he was with the Indians. Broussard hit a home run in his first game with the Mariners.

On April 21, 2007, he hit the first pinch hit grand slam in Seattle Mariners history in a 7–6 loss to the Los Angeles Angels. On May 5, 2007, he hit a home run in the 8th inning against Chien-Ming Wang, to break up a perfect game with only five outs to go.

=== Texas Rangers ===
On December 12, 2007, Broussard was traded to the Texas Rangers for infielder Tug Hulett. Broussard agreed to a one-year contract worth $3.85 million avoiding arbitration.

On May 8, 2008, Broussard was designated for assignment by the Rangers, and on May 15, he was released.

=== Yankees, Cubs, and White Sox (minors) ===
On May 27, Broussard signed a minor league contract with the New York Yankees, but was released on June 10. He signed a minor league deal with the Chicago Cubs on June 12. He returned to the Yankees on July 4 and became a free agent after the season.

On February 10, 2009, he signed a minor league deal with the Chicago White Sox but was released soon after. He later retired.

Broussard played in 2013 with the Diablos Rojos del México of the Mexican League.

== Legacy ==
Broussard is one of only five MLB players to hit two pinch-hit grand slams in the same season. The others are Davey Johnson of the Philadelphia Phillies, Mike Ivie of the San Francisco Giants, Darryl Strawberry of the New York Yankees, and Brooks Conrad of the Atlanta Braves.

== Music career ==
Ben Broussard
- Born: Benjamin Broussard; September 24, 1976 (age 49)
- Genres: Rock, Alternative rock
- Instruments: Vocals, guitar
- Years active: 2005–present
- Label: Lazy Bones
- Website: http://www.benbroussard.com/

Broussard started playing guitar at the age of 15 and played in a grunge cover band while attending college. Despite playing baseball left-handed, Broussard plays the guitar right-handed.

=== Oh Say Can You Sing? ===
Broussard got his professional music career start after appearing on the album, Oh Say Can You Sing?, a compilation of Major League Baseball players singing their favorite songs. Other big league players on the album included Jimmy Rollins, Sean Casey and Ozzie Smith.

=== Ben Broussard ===
He released a self-titled debut album in 2005. Two of his songs were featured in 2005 episodes of A&E's series Dog The Bounty Hunter.

His songs 105 and Hold on To Me were featured in episodes of The N network's South of Nowhere. Deep, another of his songs, was used in a commercial advertising the show.

=== Renovated ===
Broussard released his second full-length album, Renovated in 2009. Broussard said this about changing his career path to a professional musician:

I guess we all have that competitive fire inside. It's like a six-, eight-month grind, You have to have a mind-set to battle through things. I felt my tank was low. I went to Chicago to make the big-league club and that didn't work out. I started to wonder, 'Is this really what I want to do?' It wasn't just because I was in Charlotte.

=== Discography ===
- Oh Say Can You Sing? (2005)
- Ben Broussard (2005)
- Renovated (2009)

== Personal life ==
Broussard resides in Austin, Texas, during the off season. He is married with two daughters. Broussard is a Christian.
