= Gwyneth Jones =

Gwyneth Jones may refer to:

- Gwyneth Jones (soprano) (born 1936), Welsh soprano
- Gwyneth Jones (novelist) (born 1952), British science fiction novelist

== See also ==
- Gwyn Jones (disambiguation)
