= Gwyn Hughes (cricketer) =

Welsh cricketer

Personal information
- Born: 26 March 1941 (age 85); Cardiff, Glamorgan, Wales
- Batting: Right-handed
- Bowling: Slow left-arm orthodox

Domestic team information
- Years: Team
- 1962–1964: Glamorgan
- 1965: Cambridge University

Career statistics
Competition	First-class
Matches	27
Runs scored	457
Batting average	12.35
100s/50s	0/1
Top score	92
Balls bowled	3,263
Wickets	31
Bowling average	44.12
5 wickets in innings	0
10 wickets in match	0
Best bowling	4/31
Catches/stumpings	22/–
- Source: Cricinfo, 30 October 2011

Gwyn Hughes (born 26 March 1941) is a former Welsh cricketer who became a schoolteacher. He was born at Cardiff, Glamorgan, and attended Cardiff High School.

Hughes was a right-handed batsman who bowled slow left-arm orthodox. He made his first-class debut for Glamorgan against the touring Pakistanis in 1962. He made sixteen further first-class appearances for the county, the last of which came against Yorkshire in the 1964 County Championship. In seventeen first-class matches for Glamorgan, Hughes scored 228 runs at an average of 12.66, with a highest score of 92 against the touring Australians in 1964. With the ball, he took 12 wickets at a bowling average of 46.66, with best figures of 3/20.

While studying at Queens' College, Cambridge, Hughes played for Cambridge University Cricket Club in 1965 and gained his cricket blue, the varsity match being his final first-class appearance. In ten matches for Cambridge he scored 229 runs at an average of 12.05, with a high score of 48, and took 19 wickets at an average of 42.52, with career best figures of 4/31. A good rugby player, he represented the university.

Hughes taught economics at St Paul's School, London, for 37 years. He presided over the school's unbeaten 1st XI during his penultimate year as master in charge of cricket in 2000.
