= Gwyn Williams =

Gwyn Williams may refer to:

- Gwyn Williams (football manager), Leeds United's technical director and former manager
- Gwyn Williams (rugby), Welsh rugby union and rugby league footballer of the 1930s
- Gwyn A. Williams (1925–1995), Welsh historian
- Gwyn Williams (writer) (1904–1990), Welsh poet, novelist, translator and academic
- Gwyn Williams (politician), Wales politician
