= Gwynn Williams =

Guinn or Gwynn(e) Williams may refer to:

- Guinn Williams (Texas politician) (1871–1948), American state senator and congressman from Texas
- W. S. Gwynn Williams (1896–1978), Welsh musician
- Guinn "Big Boy" Williams (1899–1962), American actor
- Gwynne Williams (born 1937), Welsh poet and translator

== See also ==
- John Williams Gwynne (1889–1972), Republican congressman from Iowa
- Williams (surname)
