= Poway High School =

Public high school in Poway, California, United States

Location
- 15500 Espola Road; Poway, California 92064; United States; 32°59′53″N 117°01′30″W

Information
- School type: Public
- Motto: Faithful Titans we will be through the years to you
- Established: September 1961; 65 years ago
- School district: Poway Unified
- Superintendent: Ben Churchill
- School code: 052533
- Principal: Jonathan Penuliar
- Teaching staff: 95.10 (FTE)
- Grades: 9th – 12th grade
- Enrollment: 2,161 (2023–2024)
- Colors: Emerald green and grey
- Fight song: Sons of Westwood
- Athletics conference: CIF
- Mascot: Tommy Titan
- Nickname: Titans
- Rival: Rancho Bernardo High School
- Newspaper: The Iliad
- Yearbook: Odyssey
- Feeder schools: Bernardo Heights Middle School; Meadowbrook Middle School; Twin Peaks Middle School
- Website: Poway High School

Poway High School is a four-year high school in Poway, California, United States. Established in 1961, its approximately 2,100 students are from Poway and the community of Rancho Bernardo. It is accredited by the Western Association of Schools and Colleges.

== Overview ==
The four-year secondary school is accredited by the Western Association of Schools and Colleges. It has approximately 2,200 students (as of 2026) and employs 90 teachers, 62 support staff, four administrators, four counselors, one psychologist and one librarian. The length of its class periods vary, and total 55 instructional hours per week. Every Wednesday is a "late start day", with school starting one hour later, and 59-minute periods. Poway High uses a trimester-based system, with 5 class periods a trimester that are 70 minutes long each on days that aren't late starts.

The high school has a campus with several buildings. Elective course offerings include agriculture, floral design, architectural design, and computer animation. Other activities include automobile repair and design, choir, marching band, and photography. Its athletic teams are called the Titans. It has a Theatre Guild. The school also offers PLTW engineering courses and has a campus-affiliated FIRST robotics team, Team Spyder 1622.

== History ==
In 2004, the school forbade a student from wearing an anti-gay T-shirt during the school's gay–straight alliance's Day of Silence. The student, Tyler Chase Harper, filed suit, claiming that the school had violated his constitutional rights. The case was Harper v. Poway Unified School District. In 2006, the United States Court of Appeals for the Ninth Circuit, in a divided decision, denied the student's claim and held that the school's regulation of student speech in this case was constitutional. The student sought review in the U.S. Supreme Court; in 2007, the court vacated the judgment as moot because Harper had graduated.

In 2011, in a separate case, Johnson v. Poway Unified School District, the Ninth Circuit found that the school board could order a teacher to remove religious decorations (specifically, 7-foot wide, 2-foot high banners bearing Christian phrases) from his classroom, holding that the speech of teachers in school settings is government speech.

== Community overview ==
The school was established in September 1961 as the first of five comprehensive high schools in the Poway Unified School District. The general population in the district reached about 186,195 in 2014, of whom about 33,000 were students, including kindergarten through twelfth grade. The students of Poway High School are from the suburban communities of Poway and Rancho Bernardo, which are 15 miles northeast of the City of San Diego. In rare cases, students living in the nearby town of Ramona attend Poway High School because it is better funded.

== Enrollment ==
As of the 2024–2025 school year, 2,101 students attended Poway High School. When divided by grade level, 502 students were in 9th grade, 530 in 10th, 519 in 11th, and 550 in 12th. Student enrollment was 51.8% White, 30.1% Hispanic or Latino, 4.7% Asian, 11% two or more races, 1.1% African American, 2.5% Native Hawaiian or Pacific Islander, and 0% Native American or Alaska Native.

== Academics ==
Students take required classes in English, Social Science, Mathematics, Physical Science, Biological Science, Health, Physical Education, and Fine Arts. They must pass the CAHSEE in English Language Arts and Mathematics. They also take a required number of elective classes. There are three majors: university-bound, college-bound, and high school graduation. The last take electives based on their vocational interests. There are Advanced Placement, honors, and occupational courses. There are also English language and remedial courses.

In the 2012–13 school year, Poway students scored higher than the national mean on the SAT test, 784 students took AP exams, and four were National Merit semi-finalists. Student pursuits following graduation have been 5% in the military, 3% full-time employment; 1% in special schools, 37% in two-year colleges and 54% four-year colleges and universities.

== Notable alumni ==
- John Baldwin, figure skater
- Albrey Battle, football player
- Lacey Beaty, politician, mayor of Beaverton, Oregon
- Walter Bernard, football player (transferred to Rancho Buena Vista High School senior year)
- Miguel Berry, soccer player
- Brett Bochy, baseball player
- Jud Buechler, basketball player
- Kellye Cash, Miss America 1987
- Kraig Chiles, soccer player
- Marie Anne Chiment, set and costume designer
- Greg Dalby, soccer player and coach
- Tom DeLonge, guitarist/vocalist of Blink-182, Box Car Racer, and Angels and Airwaves
- Alex Dickerson (born 1990), Major League Baseball player for the San Francisco Giants
- Lauren Elaine, actress, celebrity fashion designer
- David Goeddel, biotechnology pioneer
- Tina Guo, cellist associated with Hans Zimmer
- Tony Gwynn Jr., baseball player
- Charley Hoffman, PGA Tour member, won the 2007 Bob Hope Chrysler Classic, the 2010 Deutsche Bank Championship, the 2014 OHL Classic at Mayakoba, and the 2016 Valero Texas Open
- Nate Houser, soccer player
- Connor Joe, baseball player
- Bradley Klahn, tennis player
- John Knotwell, Utah politician
- Bobby Lee, comedian/actor on MADtv, host of TigerBelly and Bad Friends podcasts
- Brian Maienschein, California politician
- Susan Meissner, author
- Thomas Neal, baseball player and coach
- Tom Norris, Grammy winning music producer, former member of the pop/rock band Allstar Weekend
- Tyler Nevin, baseball player
- Kevin Newman, baseball player
- Anisha Nicole, R&B and hip-hop singer
- Mitch Palmer, football player
- Phil Plantier, baseball player
- Brian Rast, professional poker player
- Xavier Scruggs, baseball player
- Stephanie Seymour, model
- Dave Smith, baseball player and coach
- Jesse Taylor, wrestler; currently a professional mixed martial artist
- Darshan Upadhyaya, professional League of Legends player
- Drew Wahlroos, linebacker for the St. Louis Rams
- Marvell Wynne II, soccer player
- Austin Wynns, baseball player for the San Francisco Giants
