= Gwyn Green =

American politician

Member of the Colorado House of Representatives from the 23rd district
- In office January 12, 2005 – June 1, 2009
- Preceded by: Ramey Johnson
- Succeeded by: Max Tyler

Personal details
- Born: November 21, 1938 New Orleans, Louisiana
- Died: September 12, 2018 (aged 79) Wheat Ridge, Colorado
- Party: Democratic

Gwyn Green (November 21, 1938 – September 12, 2018) was an American politician who served in the Colorado House of Representatives from the 23rd district from 2005 to 2009.

She died of ALS on September 12, 2018, in Wheat Ridge, Colorado at age 79.
