= Gwyn Martin =

Welsh photographer and pharmacist

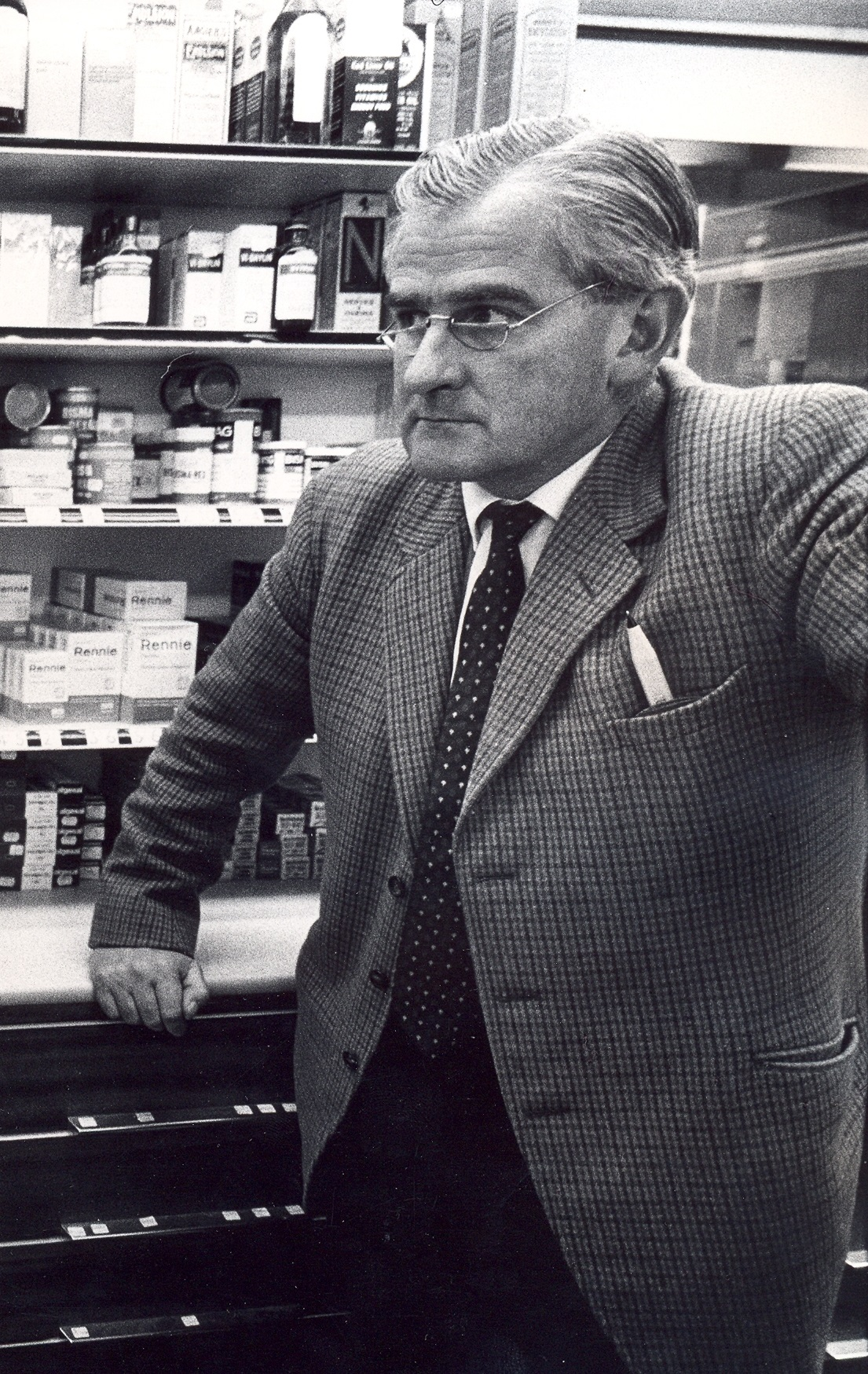
- Born: 1921; Penygraig, Rhondda, Wales
- Died: 2001 (aged 79–80); Aberystwyth, Wales
- Occupations: Photographer and pharmacist

Gwyn Martin DFM (1921–2001) was a Welsh photographer and pharmacist. He was born in the Rhondda in 1921 and died in 2001 in Aberystwyth.

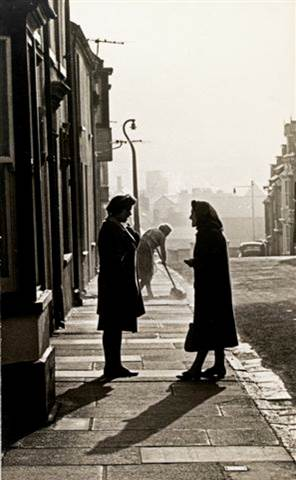
High Street, Aberystwyth, Photographed by Gwyn Martin c.1955

== Wartime experience ==
Gwyn Martin was still at school when he enlisted with the Royal Air Force (RAF) at the outbreak of the Second World War in September 1939.

After completing his training at No. 15 Operational Training Unit as a navigator in April 1941, he joined No. 75 Squadron RAF at RAF Feltwell flying the Vickers Wellington bomber.

Three months and 20 missions later he was awarded the Distinguished Flying Medal after a daylight bombing of the docks at Brest inflicting further damage to the German battleship Gneisenau. His aircraft Wellington 1457 "P" was severely damaged with repeated attacks by four Bf 109's. Pilot Officer Curry returned the damaged aircraft for a high speed crash landing at Boscombe Down without wheels or flaps.

Martin finished his first "tour" before his 20th birthday and spent the next six months at No. 12 Operational Training Unit as a Check Navigator / Bomb Aimer before returning for a second "tour" in May 1942 with a posting to No. 150 Squadron RAF at RAF Snaith.

In October 1942, on the day after his 21st birthday, Wellington BK.309 "N" was on a minelaying mission in Haugesund. The aircraft was hit by flak and severely damaged while flying at 600 feet at night. Pilot Officer Ken Rees managed to ditch the burning aircraft in a small inland lake (Langavatnet / Tysvaer). (The wreckage of the aircraft was discovered by Martin during a visit to Norway in 1964 along with the remains of the rear gunner.)

Flight Sergeant Don Taylor and Flight Sergeant Harry Dalziel were killed while the rest of the crew were captured and spent the next two and a half years as prisoners of war in Stalag Luft III near Zagan in Poland. In January 1945 he was among the prisoners force marched in Arctic conditions over 100 km to Spremberg then Luckenwalde where he was liberated by the Russians.

== Post-war activities ==
After his release from the RAF, Martin entered university and in 1948, qualified as a pharmacist.

In 1946 he married Jane Marjorie Lloyd from Aberystwyth and they both ran "Taylor Lloyd, the Chemists", in Great Darkgate Street, Aberystwyth, until their retirement.

A keen rugby player, Gwyn Martin played for Cardiff RFC, Aberavon and Llanelli, and while a student, appeared in the Welsh Final Trials of 1946–7. He was Captain of Aberystwyth RFC between 1948 and 1951 and President from 1982 onwards. He was a founder member of Aberystwyth RAFA and elected a life member. For 18 years he was the Honorary Secretary of the Aberystwyth branch of the RNLI and then became their President.

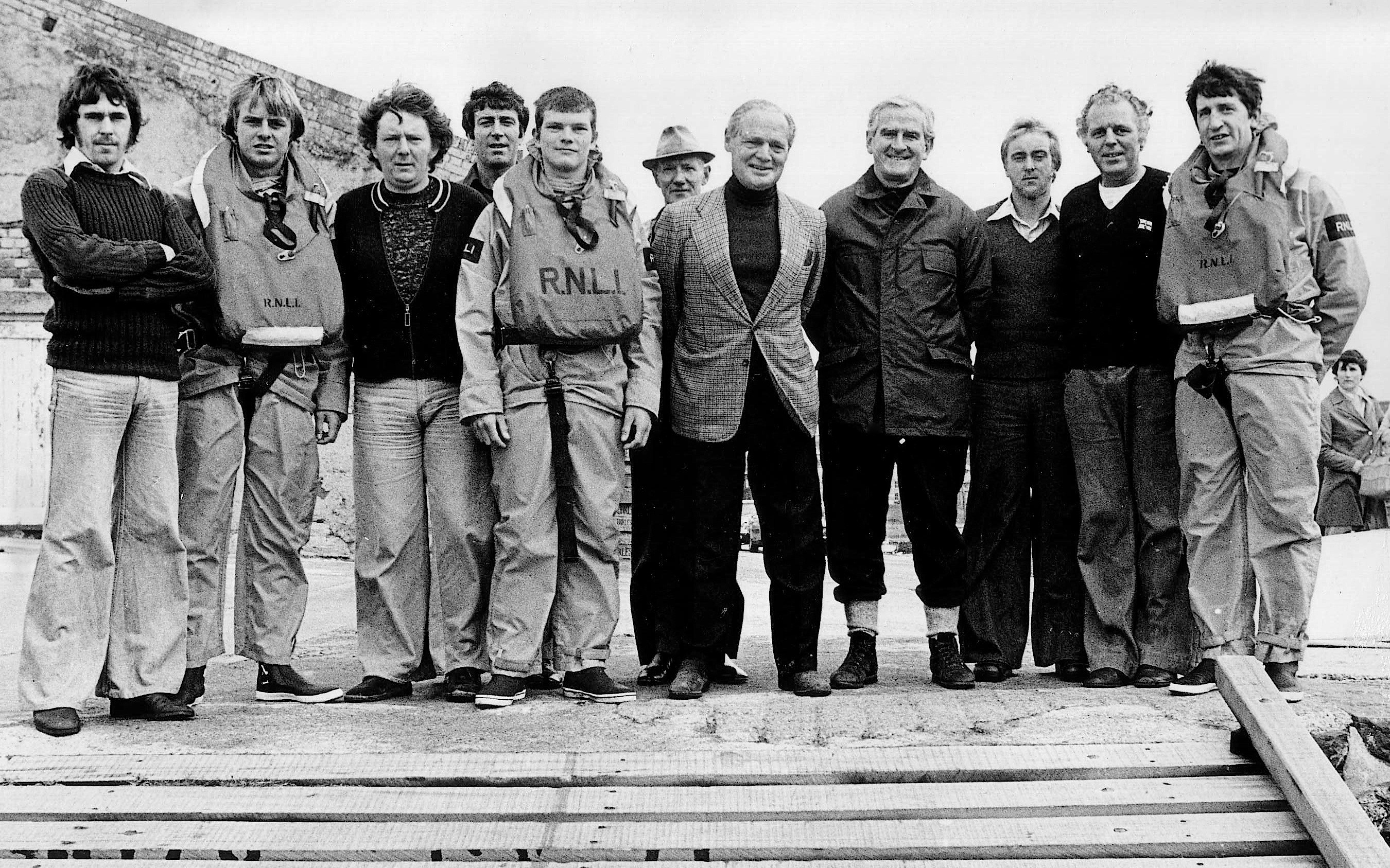
Martin with Douglas Bader and RNLI crew (Aberystwyth) (1977)

In 1989 Martin published his "partial" autobiography, Up and Under, which detailed his war years and the time he spent as a POW at what he called the "University of Life" in Stalag Luft III.

== Photography ==
It is as an enthusiastic and distinguished photographer that Martin is best remembered; he was President of Aberystwyth Camera Club from 1958 onwards.

In 2004 Lindy and David Martin published a book, A Stroll Around the Harbour, showing some of the changes that had taken place in Aberystwyth through the eyes of their father, in which many of his photographs are to be found.

Following his death his collection of photographs was placed in the National Library of Wales in Aberystwyth.

Gwyn Martin supplied the photographs of local Aberystwyth RFC supporters for a book containing 30 popular rugby songs titled Sosban Fach, published in 1987.

== Books with contributions by Martin ==
- Brown, Stuart (1987). Sosban Fach. UK: Y Lolfa. ISBN 0-86243-134-4.
- Martin, Gwyn (1989). Up and Under. UK: Gwyn Martin. ISBN 0-9515371-0-5.
- Martin, Lindy; Martin, David (2004). A Stroll Around the Harbour. LLGC/NLW: Y Lolfa Cyf. ISBN 0-86243-773-3.
