= Ricky Wright (ring announcer) =

Welsh ring announcer (born 1986)

Ricky Wayne Wright (born Ricky Wayne Wright February 4, 1986) is a boxing and mixed martial arts ring announcer from Rhondda, South Wales.

== Announcing career ==
He began announcing in 2009 when his BJJ coach needed an MC for an MMA show held at the town hall in Maesteg, South Wales. Since then he’s established himself as one of the busiest and most reliable MCs in the UK. Within MMA Ricky has worked for some of the UK’s most prestigious promotions including Cage Warriors, Shock N’Awe, Tanko FC and Pain Pit. In 2013 Ricky was granted a master of ceremonies license by the British Boxing Board of Control, which allows him to MC professional boxing contests. To this day he has worked with the likes of Matchroom Boxing, Cyclone Promotions, Hatton Boxing, Sanigar Events, Goodwin Boxing and Hellraiser promotions. In November 2015 he began to work for the international mixed martial arts federation (IMMAF) where he was the MC for the European open championships held in Birmingham, UK. In July 2016 he was flown out to the USA to MC the IMMAF world championships held at the Las Vegas convention centre, which was part of the UFC’s international fight week. The highlights were shown on BT Sports in the UK. In November 2016 he was flown to Prague, Czech Republic to once again MC the IMMAF European open. In 2017 Ringnews24.com awarded Ricky with MC of the year.

== Television work ==
In 2012 Ricky appeared in a Welsh language documentary titled “Cwffio Cawell" that aired on Welsh TV channel S4C. The cameras were around filming a life in the day of a mixed martial arts MC in the lead up to an event. The documentary was highly received by the Welsh public.

In 2015 he was approached by Avanti Media to provide on screen introductions for presenters Jonathan Davies (rugby, born 1962), Sarra Elgan and Nigel Owens on S4C's hit show Jonathan, which produced seven episodes during the course of the Rugby World Cup.
