= Gwyn Jones =

Gwyn Jones may refer to:

- Gwyn Jones (author) (1907–1999), Welsh historian, translator and story writer
- Gwyn Jones (figure skater) (born 1939), South African pair skater
- Gwyn Jones (footballer, born 1912) (1912–1968), footballer for Merthyr Town, Huddersfield Town, Rochdale, Stockport County & Tranmere Rovers
- Gwyn Jones (footballer, born 1935) (1935–2020), Welsh footballer for Wolverhampton Wanderers and Bristol Rovers
- Gwyn Jones (physicist) (1917–2006), Welsh physics professor and director of the National Museum of Wales
- Gwyn Jones (rugby union) (born 1972), former Wales international rugby union player
- Gwyn Hughes Jones (born 1969), Welsh operatic tenor

== See also ==
- Gwyneth Jones (disambiguation)
- T. Gwynn Jones (1871–1949), Welsh poet
