= Herbert Britton Gwyn =

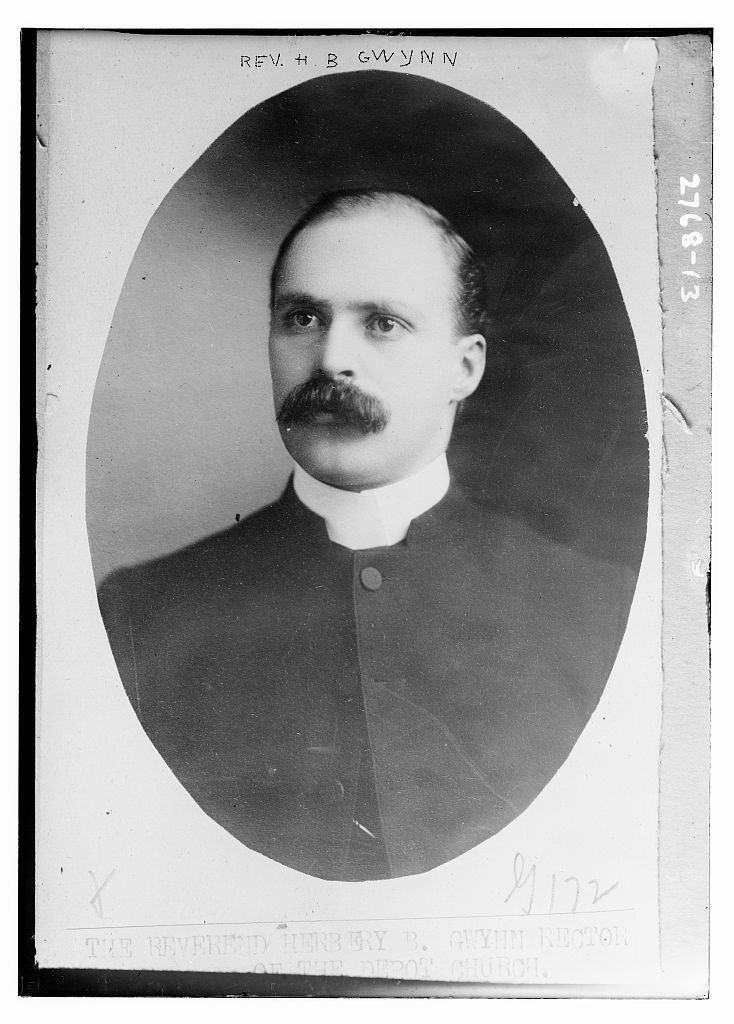
Herbert Britton Gwyn in 1913

The Reverend Herbert Britton Gwyn (May 5, 1873 – March 26, 1934) was the editor of The Churchman, the New York weekly representing the Low Church faction of the Protestant Episcopal Church.

== Biography ==
He was born on May 5, 1873, in Canada. He had been a minister at a church in Chicago before he started newspaper work. He then worked at St. Edmund's Church in Chicago and married Virginia E. Perceval in 1914. By 1930 he and his wife were living in Tiverton, Rhode Island. He died on March 26, 1934.
