= Gwyn Thomas =

Gwyn Thomas may refer to:

- Gwyn Thomas (sportsman) (1891–1932), Welsh cricketer for Glamorgan CCC, and rugby union footballer for Neath RFC
- Gwyn Thomas (rugby) (1892–1984), rugby union and rugby league footballer of the 1910s, and 1920s
- Gwyn Thomas (novelist) (1913–1981), prose writer
- Gwyn Thomas (poet) (1936–2016), National Poet for Wales 2006
- Gwyn Thomas (tennis) (1940–2005), American tennis player (female)
- Gwyn Thomas (reporter) (1913–2010), crime reporter
- Gwyn Thomas (footballer) (born 1957), retired Welsh footballer
