= Tony Gwynn Jr. =

American baseball player and analyst (born 1982)

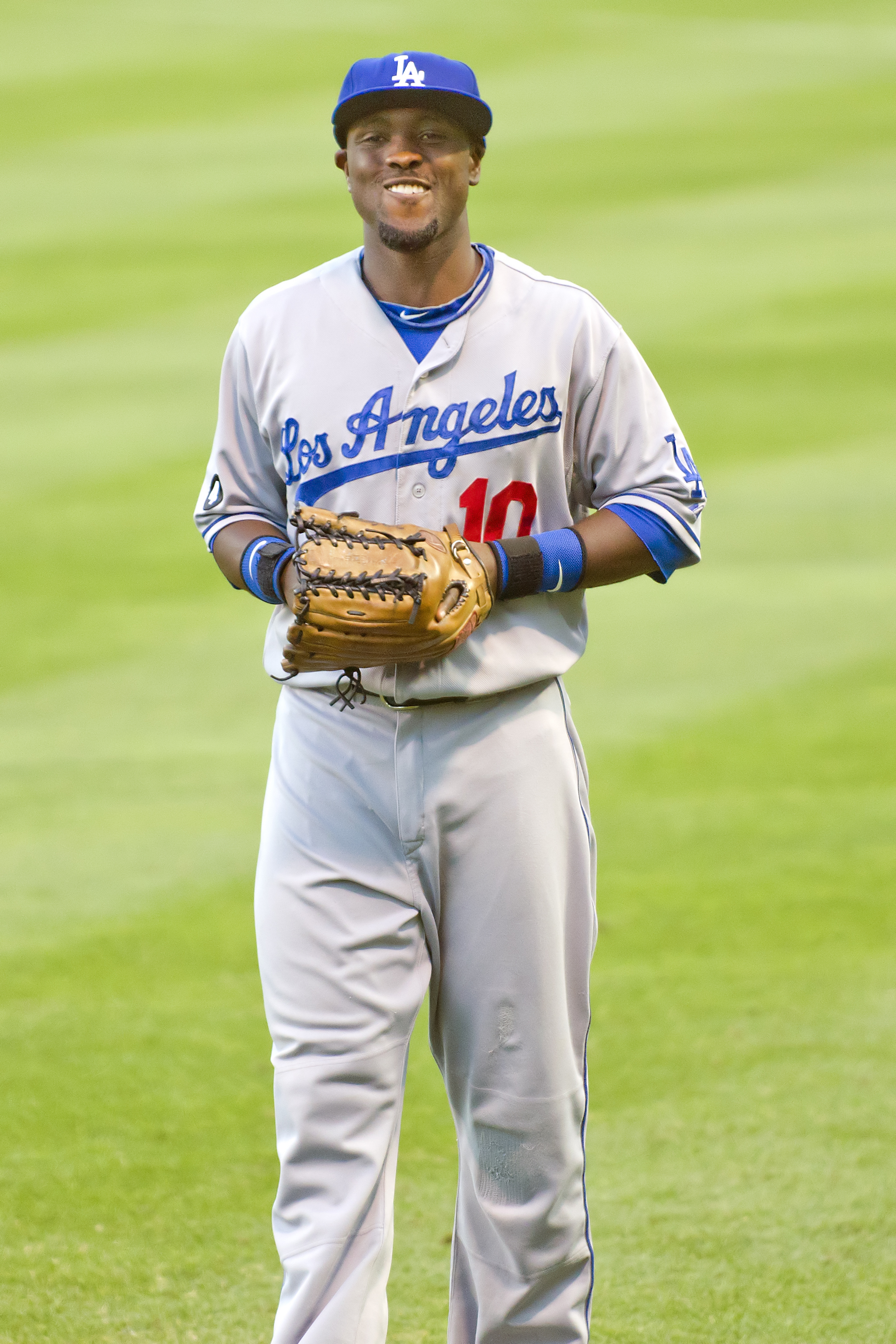
- Gwynn with the Los Angeles Dodgers in 2011
- Outfielder
- Born: October 4, 1982 (age 44); Long Beach, California, U.S.
- Batted: Left Threw: Right

MLB debut
- July 15, 2006, for the Milwaukee Brewers

Last MLB appearance
- September 28, 2014, for the Philadelphia Phillies

MLB statistics
- Batting average: .238
- Home runs: 7
- Runs batted in: 98
- Stats at Baseball Reference

Teams
- Milwaukee Brewers (2006–2008); San Diego Padres (2009–2010); Los Angeles Dodgers (2011–2012); Philadelphia Phillies (2014)

Anthony Keith Gwynn Jr. (born October 4, 1982) is an American former professional baseball outfielder. Gwynn played in Major League Baseball (MLB) for the Milwaukee Brewers, San Diego Padres, Los Angeles Dodgers, and Philadelphia Phillies. The son of Baseball Hall of Famer Tony Gwynn, he works as a broadcaster for the Padres’ radio network and as an afternoon sports talk host on the Padres' flagship radio station.

== Amateur career ==
Gwynn graduated from Poway High School in California. He was drafted out of high school by the Atlanta Braves in the 33rd round of the 2000 MLB draft but did not sign. He played college baseball at his father's alma mater, San Diego State University. In 2002, he played collegiate summer baseball with the Brewster Whitecaps of the Cape Cod Baseball League and was named a league all-star. He was a Mountain West Conference All-Star with his junior year in 2003, when he hit .359 and stole 25 bases.

== Professional career ==
=== Milwaukee Brewers ===
Gwynn was drafted by the Milwaukee Brewers in the 2nd round of the 2003 MLB draft. After a couple of years in the minor leagues, he made his major league debut on July 15, 2006, as a pinch hitter against the Arizona Diamondbacks. His first major league hit on July 19 (against San Francisco Giants closer Brian Wilson) came exactly 24 years to the day of his father's first major league hit — both doubles. Towards the end of the 2006 campaign, Gwynn received more playing time, replacing Brady Clark in the lineup. He appeared in 32 games for the Brewers in 2006, hitting .260 and made the Brewers' opening day roster for 2007.

Late in the 2007 season, the San Diego Padres were in Milwaukee attempting to clinch a playoff berth. Closer Trevor Hoffman was one out away from sending the Padres to the playoffs, but the tying run was on second base. Gwynn pinch-hit for Bill Hall against his dad's former team, and dramatically tied the game with a triple. The Padres would go on to lose the game as well as the season finale on the next day, opening the door for the Colorado Rockies to force a one-game playoff with San Diego. The Rockies defeated the Padres in a wild contest, keeping them out of the postseason.

With a focus on defense, Brewers manager Ned Yost indicated in March 2008 that Gwynn and Gabe Kapler might have a leg up on Gabe Gross for an outfield position; this became true when Gross was traded to the Tampa Bay Rays on April 22, 2008. Gwynn was optioned to the Nashville Sounds of the Triple-A Pacific Coast League on May 25, 2008, but recalled after rosters expanded on September 1. In 3 years with the Brewers, Gwynn hit .248 in 130 games.

=== San Diego Padres ===
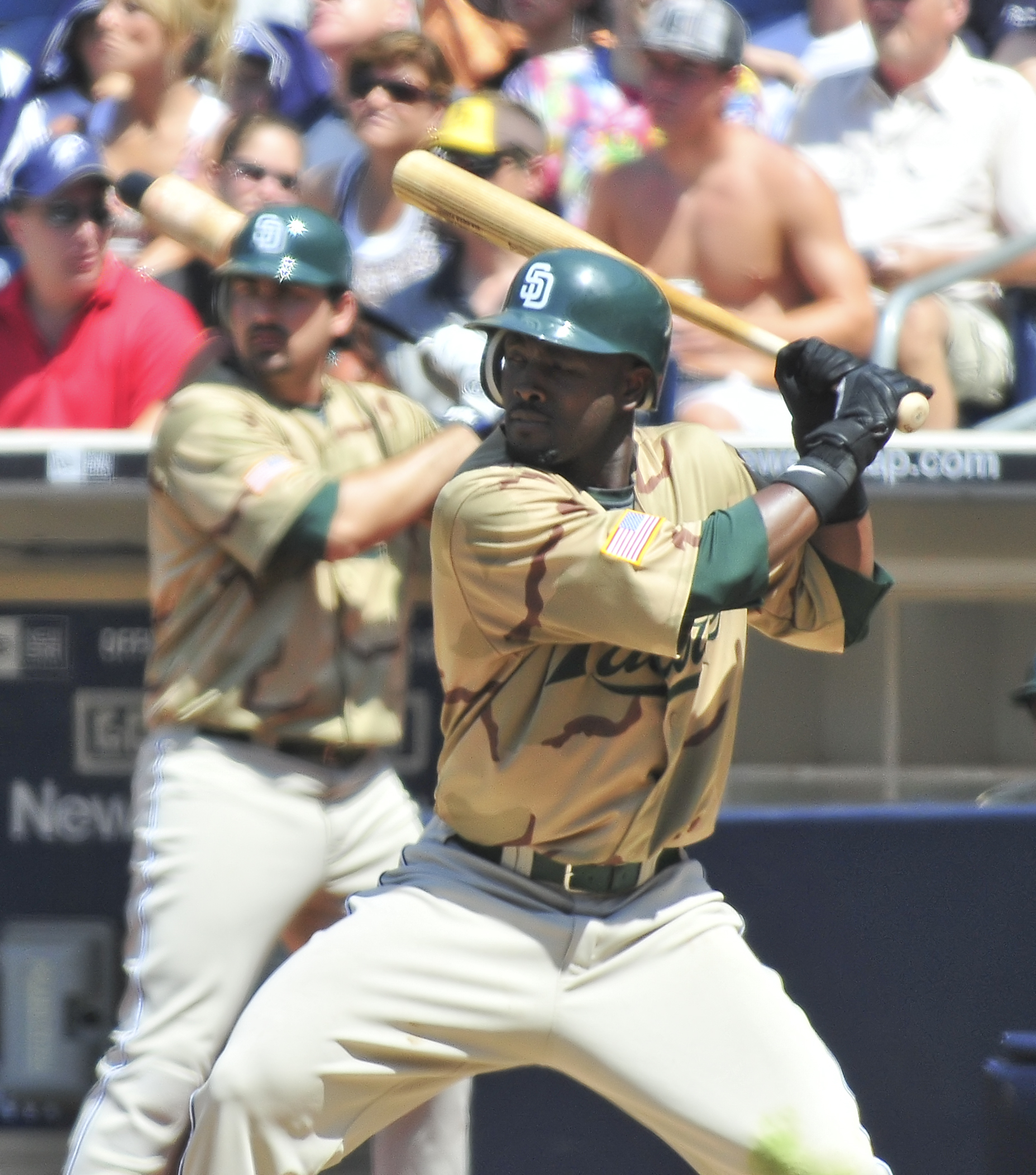
Gwynn with the San Diego Padres on July 19, 2009.

On May 21, 2009, Gwynn was traded to the San Diego Padres for outfielder Jody Gerut. Gwynn was informed of the trade by a phone call from his father, who played his entire career with the Padres. In his first game with the Padres, the same day he was traded, Gwynn pinch-hit in the 9th inning. He drew a walk and then scored the winning run.

In two seasons (236 games and 682 at bats) with the San Diego Padres, Gwynn Jr. accumulated 165 hits, 20 doubles, 9 triples, 5 home runs (2 of which were inside the park), and 41 RBI, with a .242 batting average. Gwynn wore the number 18 with the Padres, with his father's number 19 having been retired.

=== Los Angeles Dodgers ===
Gwynn agreed to a one-year contract with the Los Angeles Dodgers on December 8, 2010. He played in 136 games with the Dodgers in 2011, the highest total of his career, and hit .256 with 22 stolen bases.

On June 1, 2012, Gwynn was part of a Dodgers lineup featuring the sons of five former Major Leaguers (along with Jerry Hairston Jr., Iván DeJesús Jr., Dee Gordon and Scott Van Slyke), being the first time in Major League Baseball history that this had occurred. In 103 games in 2012, he hit .232 with 13 stolen bases. Gwynn was designated for assignment on August 6, and accepted an assignment to the Triple-A Albuquerque Isotopes, where he hit .338 in 19 games.

Gwynn spent the entire 2013 season with Albuquerque, where he hit .300 in 104 games.

=== Philadelphia Phillies ===
On December 24, 2013, Gwynn signed a minor league contract with the Philadelphia Phillies containing an invitation to Major League spring training. At the end of spring training, it was announced that Gwynn had made the Opening Day roster to start the 2014 season, which culminated a "long road" back to the major leagues. He was the Phillies' opening day starter in left field (Domonic Brown, the projected starter in left field, started at designated hitter as the Phillies opened the season on the road against the Texas Rangers), and batted in the ninth position. Later, when Ben Revere had sore ribs, Gwynn started and batted in the leadoff position, and because of his performance, started several games after Revere had recovered. Following the death of his father, Gwynn Jr. was placed on the bereavement list on June 16. He was designated for assignment on July 21, and released on July 28. Gwynn later re-signed to the Phillies on a minor league contract on August 3, and was assigned to their Triple-A affiliate, the Lehigh Valley IronPigs. He was called back up by the Phillies on September 2. On October 10, Gwynn refused assignment to Triple-A and was released.

=== Washington Nationals ===
On March 2, 2015, Gwynn signed a minor league contract with the Washington Nationals. In 89 appearances for the Triple-A Syracuse Chiefs, he slashed .255/.327/.332 with one home run, 27 RBI, and 10 stolen bases. Gwynn elected free agency following the season on November 6.

== Post-playing career ==
On February 25, 2016, it was announced that Gwynn would be joining the Los Angeles Dodgers broadcast team as co-host of the post-game Dodger Talk show on KLAC radio. After one season, Gwynn joined the San Diego Padres as an analyst, working both radio and TV broadcasts for KBZT and Bally Sports San Diego, respectively. In April 2018, he joined former San Diego State baseball player Chris Ello as host of an afternoon drive sports talk show, Gwynn & Chris, when KWFN became the flagship station for the Padres. In spring 2023, the program was the highest rated afternoon drive program in the San Diego market. He assumed full-time duties as color commentator for Padres radio broadcasts in the 2022 season.

== Personal life ==
Gwynn is the son of baseball Hall of Famer Tony Gwynn Sr., who died of salivary gland cancer on June 16, 2014, and Alicia Gwynn. He is the nephew of Chris Gwynn, and brother of musician Anisha Nicole. Gwynn and his wife Alyse Mallek have four children; three daughters Makayla, Jordan and Leighton and a son, Anthony Keith III.

== See also ==
- List of second-generation Major League Baseball players
