= Chris Gwynn =

American baseball player (born 1964)

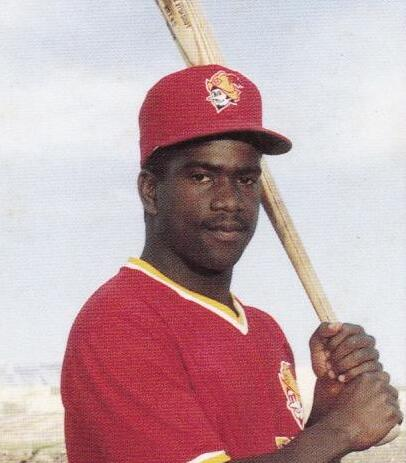
- Gwynn with the Albuquerque Dukes c. 1987
- Outfielder
- Born: October 13, 1964 (age 61); Los Angeles, California, U.S.
- Batted: Left Threw: Left

MLB debut
- August 14, 1987, for the Los Angeles Dodgers

Last MLB appearance
- September 29, 1996, for the San Diego Padres

MLB statistics
- Batting average: .261
- Home runs: 17
- Runs batted in: 118
- Stats at Baseball Reference

Teams
- Los Angeles Dodgers (1987–1991); Kansas City Royals (1992–1993); Los Angeles Dodgers (1994–1995); San Diego Padres (1996)

Career highlights and awards
- World Series champion (1988)
Medals
Representing United States
Men's baseball
Summer Olympics
Silver medal – second place	1984 Los Angeles	Team

Christopher Karlton Gwynn (born October 13, 1964) is an American former Major League Baseball (MLB) outfielder. He is the younger brother of Hall of Famer Tony Gwynn.

== Early life ==
Gwynn was born in Los Angeles and raised in Long Beach, California.

== Playing career ==
The California Angels drafted Gwynn in the fifth round of the 1982 Major League Baseball draft. However, Gwynn did not sign with the Angels, opting to attend San Diego State University, where he played college baseball for the San Diego State Aztecs baseball team. Gwynn played for the United States national baseball team in the 1984 Summer Olympics, winning a silver medal.

Gwynn was drafted by the Los Angeles Dodgers in the first round (tenth overall) of the 1985 Major League Baseball draft. He made his MLB debut in 1987. While with the Dodgers, Gwynn made the final out in Dennis Martínez's perfect game on July 28, 1991. After that season, the Dodgers traded Gwynn with minor leaguer Domingo Mota to the Kansas City Royals for Todd Benzinger. Gwynn played two seasons with the Kansas City Royals (1992–1993). Gwynn signed with the Dodgers as a free agent after the 1993 season, and he played with them in 1994 and 1995. He joined his older brother Tony on the San Diego Padres for his final season in 1996.

On September 29, 1996, in the final game of the season, Gwynn hit what would prove to be the game-winning, two-run, pinch-hit double in the top of the 11th inning against Los Angeles Dodgers pitcher Chan Ho Park to complete a three-game sweep of the Dodgers and clinch the Padres' second National League West division championship in team history. It was the final regular season at bat of his career, however he also pinch-hit in each of the first two games of the subsequent Division Series loss to the St. Louis Cardinals, garnering hits in both of those at bats, ending his career on a 3-for-3 streak. Gwynn hit six pinch-hit home runs during his career, including one walk-off home run.

In a 10-year career spanning 599 games, Gwynn posted a .261 batting average with 119 runs, 17 home runs and 118 RBI. An excellent outfielder playing at all three outfield positions and several games at first base, he committed only one error in 382 total chances for a .997 fielding percentage. His only miscue in the majors occurred on September 28, 1993, with the Royals against the Cleveland Indians.

== Post-playing career ==
Gwynn became a scout for the Padres once his playing career ended. In 2011, he was the Director of Player Personnel for the Padres. After the 2011 season, Gwynn became the Director of Player Development for the Seattle Mariners. He resigned from the Mariners in 2015.

== Personal life ==
Gwynn lives in California with his wife. They have two adult children. Gwynn's older brother, Tony, is in the National Baseball Hall of Fame. Their older brother, Charles, is in the Cal State Los Angeles Athletics Hall of Fame. Tony's son, Tony Gwynn Jr., also played in MLB.
