= Gwyn Morgans =

Welsh footballer (1932–2023)

Personal information
- Full name: Morgan Gwyn Morgans
- Date of birth: 20 April 1932
- Place of birth: Blaenau Ffestiniog, Wales
- Date of death: 23 July 2023 (aged 91)
- Position: Wing-half

Senior career*
Years	Team	Apps	(Gls)
- Blaenau Ffestiniog Amateur
1955–1956	Northampton Town	0	(0)
1956–1958	Wrexham	28	(2)
1958–1959	Southport	14	(0)
- Blaenau Ffestiniog Amateur
- * Club domestic league appearances and goals

Morgan Gwyn Morgans (20 April 1932 – 23 July 2023) was a Welsh professional footballer who played as a wing-half, making appearances in the English Football League for Wrexham and Southport.

Morgans died on 23 July 2023, at the age of 91.
