= Gwyn Lewis =

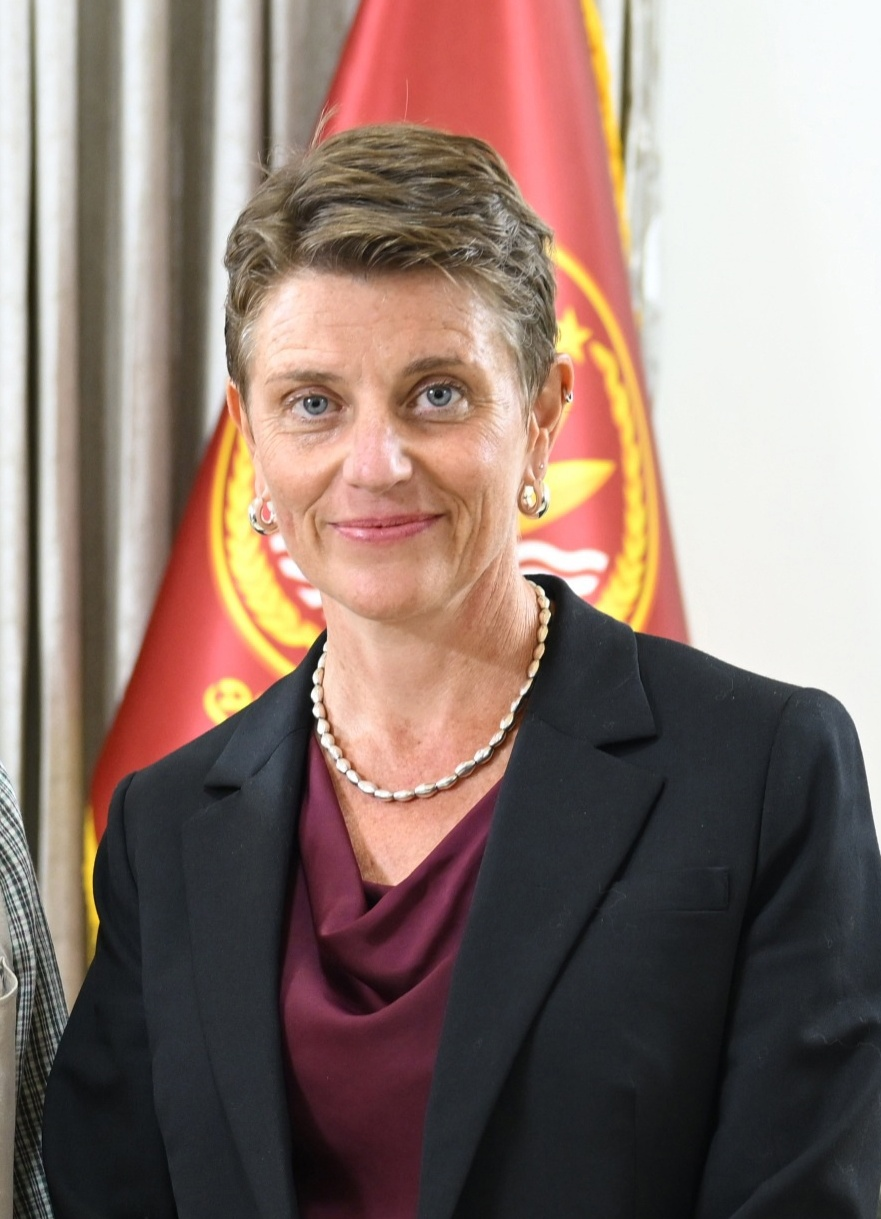

United Nations Resident Coordinator in Bangladesh

Personal details
- Education: University of Kent; San Francisco State University
- Profession: Diplomat, humanitarian, development professional

Gwyn Lewis is an international development and humanitarian affairs professional currently serving as the United Nations Resident Coordinator in Bangladesh. She is the former Director of UNRWA Affairs in the West Bank.

== Early life and education ==
Lewis holds a master’s degree in International Relations and European Studies from the University of Kent, Canterbury, and a bachelor’s degree in Economics from San Francisco State University. She is fluent in English and French.

== Career ==
Lewis began her career in the humanitarian and development sector in the 1990s. Over the years, she has held several senior roles within the United Nations system and international non-governmental organizations. She worked with the International Committee of the Red Cross (ICRC) and the United Nations Mission in Kosovo, and supported humanitarian efforts in Tajikistan, Afghanistan, and Albania.

Lewis later served with the United Nations Office for the Coordination of Humanitarian Affairs (OCHA) in Geneva, where she focused on building UN–NGO partnerships and supported the rollout of the humanitarian reform agenda. Lewis also worked with the Food and Agriculture Organization (FAO) on humanitarian policy and the support of FAO’s country operations, before joining UNICEF, where she managed the Global Clusters Coordination section in the agency’s Emergency Division.

Lewis went on to hold senior leadership roles at the United Nations Relief and Works Agency for Palestine Refugees in the Near East (UNRWA). She was Deputy Director for Programs in Lebanon and later served as Director of UNRWA Affairs in the West Bank from 2019. In that capacity, she led a team of 4,000 staff members. She oversaw the provision of essential services and humanitarian aid to over 850,000 Palestine refugees in the West Bank, including East Jerusalem. In her statement at the 30th Special Session of the Human Rights Council on 27 May 2021, she expressed deep concern over the escalation of violence in Gaza and the West Bank, including East Jerusalem.

On 8 May 2022, UN Secretary-General Antonio Guterres appointed Lewis of Ireland as the UN Resident Coordinator in Bangladesh. Lewis leads the UN Country Team and serves as the designated representative of the UN Secretary-General. She oversees the implementation of the UN Sustainable Development Cooperation Framework (UNSDCF) 2022–2026, which aligns with Bangladesh’s 8th Five Year Plan and long-term development vision outlined in the Perspective Plan 2041. Her responsibilities include coordinating UN development efforts, engaging with government and civil society partners, and advocating for sustainable development, human rights, and inclusion. In July 2024, Lewis questioned Home Minister Asaduzzaman Khan Kamal about the use of vehicles with UN logos by the army during the violent quota reform protests in Bangladesh, alongside inquiries about lethal force and juvenile arrests. The Home Minister explained that the UN logos were used unintentionally and removed promptly, with lethal force justified to protect lives and property, and a judicial investigation committee established to probe the incidents, including police actions.

After the fall of the Sheikh Hasina led Awami League government, Lewis announced that the UN would engage with all major political parties in Bangladesh as part of a needs assessment mission to provide technical support to the Election Commission for the upcoming parliamentary elections. She assured the International Crimes Tribunal (ICT) in Bangladesh of the UN's continued support to ensure a smooth and transparent trial process for crimes against humanity after meeting prosecutor Muhammad Tajul Islam.

In June 2025, Lewis emphasised that inclusive politics involving all political parties is crucial to prevent polarisation and unrest in Bangladesh, while appreciating the interim government's robust reform efforts. The UN human rights office recommended against banning political parties to maintain a genuine multiparty democracy, and Lewis stressed that inclusiveness means every Bangladeshi has a voice in credible and peaceful elections. Lewis stated that an inclusive election in Bangladesh is about every citizen, including women, youth, ethnic minorities, and religious communities, having the opportunity to vote, rather than the participation of specific political parties such as the Awami League The UN is also establishing a human rights office in Bangladesh to support ongoing reforms across various sectors. Lewis reaffirmed strong UN support for Bangladesh’s reform and transition process during a meeting with Chief Adviser Muhammad Yunus, focusing on bolstering the interim government’s reform initiatives and ensuring a smooth transition as Bangladesh prepares to graduate from LDC status.
