= Gwynne =

Gwynne is an Anglified spelling of the Welsh name Gwyn which means 'white' or/and 'blessed'.

== Given name ==
- Gwynne Dyer (b. 1943), male Canadian journalist
- G. Blakemore Evans (1912–2005), male American scholar
- Gwynne Evans (1880–1965), male American swimmer
- Gwynne Geyer, American operatic soprano
- Gwynne Gilford (b. 1946), American actress
- Gwynne Herbert (1859–1946), British actress
- Gwynne Jones (b. 1945), male English cricketer
- Gwynne Kimpton (1873–1930), English musician and conductor
- Gwynne McElveen (born 1974), American-born Irish actress
- Gwynne Nettler (1913–2007), Canadian sociologist, psychologist, and movie stuntman
- Gwynne Pugh, male American architect
- Gwynne Shipman (1909–2005), American film actress
- Gwynne Shotwell (b. 1963), American businesswoman
- Gwynne Williams (born 1937), male Welsh writer
- Gwynne Wilcox, American attorney and politician

== Surname ==
- Andrew Gwynne (b. 1974), British politician
- Anne Gwynne (b. 1918), American film actress
- Bill Gwynne (1913–1991), New Zealand cricket umpire
- David Gwynne (1904–1934), Welsh cricketer
- Edward Castres Gwynne (1811–1888), Australian lawyer
- Emlyn Gwynne (1898–1962), Welsh rugby player
- Fred Gwynne (1926–1993), American actor
- Gavin Gwynne (b. 1990), Welsh professional boxer
- George Gwynne (1623–1673), Welsh politician
- Glen Gwynne (b. 1972), Australian soccer player
- Haydn Gwynne (1957–2023), English actress
- Horace Gwynne (1912–2001), Canadian boxer
- Howell Arthur Gwynne (1865–1950), British author
- Howell Gwynne (MP), British politician
- Ivor Gwynne (1867–1934), Welsh politician
- Jack Gwynne (1895–1969), American illusionist
- Jason Gwynne, British journalist
- John Gwynne (disambiguation), several people
  - John W. Gwynne (1889–1972), American politician
  - John Wellington Gwynne (1814–1902), Canadian lawyer
  - John Gwynne (captain), mercenary soldier
  - John Gwynne (commentator) (b. 1945), British sports commentator
  - John Gwynne (MP for Bath), English politician
- Julia Gwynne (1856–1934), English opera singer
- Llewellyn Gwynne (1863–1957), Welsh Anglican Bishop
- Marmaduke Gwynne (1691–1769), Methodist convert
- Michael C. Gwynne (born 1942), American actor
- Nathaniel Gwynne (1849–1883), American soldier
- Nevile Gwynne, British writer
- Patrick Gwynne (1913–2003), British modernist architect
- Peter Gwynne (1929–2011), Australian actor
- Phillip Gwynne (b. 1958), Australian author
- Roland Gwynne (1882–1971), Mayor of Eastbourne, Sussex
- Rowland Gwynne (1658–1726), Welsh politician
- Rupert Gwynne (1873–1924), British politician
- S. C. Gwynne, American writer
- Sam Gwynne (b. 1987), English footballer
- Allan Gwynne-Jones (1892–1982), English painter
- David Thomas Gwynne-Vaughan (1871–1915), Welsh botanist
- Helen Gwynne-Vaughan (1879–1967), English botanist
- Meredith Gwynne Evans (1904–1952), British physical chemist
- Peter Gwynn-Jones (1940–2010), English officer of arms

== Other ==
- Gwynne Building, historic building in Cincinnati, United States
- Gwynne, Alberta, hamlet in central Alberta, Canada
- Gwynne Road, road in Lucknow, India
- Nell Gwynne (operetta), comic opera by Robert Planquette

== See also ==
- Gwynnes Limited
- Gwyn (disambiguation)
