= Gwin =

Gwin may refer to:

== Fictional ==
- An animal character in Cornelia Funke's Inkworld trilogy

== People ==
- Aaron Gwin, American professional downhill mountain biker
- James Gwin (1769–1841), American Methodist minister
- James S. Gwin (born 1954), United States federal judge
- Jerry Gwin (1880–?), American college football coach
- Lucy Gwin (1943–2014), American disability rights activist and magazine editor
- Robert Gwin, a Welsh Roman Catholic divine
- William Gwin (disambiguation)

== Places ==
- Gwin Town, a populated place in the county of Grand Gedeh in Liberia
- Gwin, Mississippi
- Gwin Island

== Mythology ==
- Adar Llwch Gwin, giant birds, similar in kind to the griffin, which were given to a warrior named Drudwas ap Tryffin by his fairy wife

== Other ==
- USS Gwin, four ships of this name in the United States Navy

== See also ==
- Gwinn (disambiguation)
- Gwyn (disambiguation)
- Gwynne (disambiguation)
