= Gwyn =

Gwyn or Gwynn may refer to:

== People ==
- Gwyn (name), includes a list of people with the given name or surname Gwyn, including variants such as Gwynn and Gwynne

== Fictional or mythological characters ==
- Gwyn ap Nudd, in Welsh mythology
- Gwynn (Sluggy Freelance), a character in the webcomic
- Gwyn, Lord of Cinder, a character in the video game Dark Souls
- Gwyn, nickname of Gwyndala, a character in the animated television series Star Trek: Prodigy

== Places in the United States ==
- Gwynn, Virginia
- Gwynn's Island, Virginia

== See also ==
- Gwynn Park High School, Maryland
- St Richard Gwyn Roman Catholic High School (disambiguation)
- Nell Gwyn (disambiguation)
- Ty Gwyn (disambiguation)
- Gwin (disambiguation)
- Gwinn (disambiguation)
- Gwynne (disambiguation)
