= Richard Gwyn (disambiguation) =

Richard Gwyn (c. 1537–1584) was a Welsh schoolteacher and Catholic martyr and saint.

Richard Gwyn may also refer to:

- Richard Gwyn (Canadian writer) (1934–2020), Canadian journalist, author and historian
- Richard Gwyn (Welsh writer) (born 1956), Welsh novelist, essayist and poet

== See also ==
- St Richard Gwyn Roman Catholic High School (disambiguation)
- Richard Gwynn, Welsh Anglican priest in the 17th century
- Richard Wynn (disambiguation)
