= Gwinn =

Gwinn may refer to:

== People ==
- Alfred W. Gwinn (fl. 2004–2012), American former United Methodist Church bishop
- Charles J. M. Gwinn (1822–1894), American lawyer and politician, Attorney General of Maryland
- Curtis Gwinn, writer of Fat Guy Stuck in Internet
- Dick Gwinn (born c. 1936), American college football coach and former player
- Donald Gwinn (1902–1961), American hammer thrower
- Giulia Gwinn, German footballer
- John Gwinn (1791–1849), United States Navy captain
- Lambert Estes Gwinn (1884–1958), American attorney, educator, and politician
- Nancy E. Gwinn (1945–2024), American librarian and administrator
- Peter Gwinn, American comedy writer and improviser
- Ralph W. Gwinn (1884–1962), American politician
- William Gwinn (c. 1755–?), one of the first African-Americans to participate in the antebellum American Back-to-Africa movement
- Gwinn Henry (1887–1955), American college football player, track athlete, head coach, and college athletics administrator

== Places ==
- Gwinn, Michigan, United States, an unincorporated community
- Gwinn Mountain, West Virginia, United States

== Other uses ==
- Gwinn Aircar, a single-engined biplane whose development was abandoned in 1938 after a crash

== See also ==
- Gwin (disambiguation)
- Gwyn (disambiguation)
