= St Richard Gwyn Roman Catholic High School =

St Richard Gwyn Roman Catholic High School may refer to the following schools in Wales:

- St Richard Gwyn Catholic High School, Flint
- St Richard Gwyn Catholic High School, Barry

== See also ==
- Richard Gwyn
