= John L. Hagan =

John Hagan
- Education: University of Illinois Urbana-Champaign (BA); University of Alberta (MA, PhD)
- Awards: Co-recipient of the Stockholm Prize in Criminology (2009, with Raúl Zaffaroni) and the Outstanding Book Award from International Section of the Academy of Criminal Justice Sciences (2013, with Sanja Kutnjak Ivković)
- Scientific career
- Fields: Sociology; Criminology
- Institutions: Northwestern University
- Thesis: Criminal justice in a Canadian province: a study of the sentencing process (1974)
- Doctoral advisor: Gwynn Nettler

John L. Hagan is an American sociologist focusing on criminology. He is currently the John D. MacArthur Professor of Sociology and Law at Northwestern University and University Professor Emeritus of Law and Sociology at University of Toronto and also formerly the Dahlstrom Distinguished Professor of Sociology and Law at University of North Carolina (1994-96).

He is an Elected Fellow to the American Academy of Arts and Sciences, Royal Society of Canada, Canadian Institute for Advanced Research and American Society of Criminology. In May 2017, he was inducted into the National Academy of Sciences. He was the founding Editor of the Annual Review of Law and Social Science in 2005 and served until 2018.

== Early life and education ==
Hagan received a bachelor of arts in sociology in 1968 from the University of Illinois Urbana-Champaign, a master of arts in sociology in 1971 from the University of Alberta and a Ph.D. in sociology in 1974, also from the University of Alberta.
