= John Gwynne =

John Gwynne, Gwynn or Gwyn may refer to:

== Politicians ==
- John W. Gwynne (1889–1972), Republican U.S. representative from Iowa
- John Gwynne (MP for Bath) (fl. 1563), English member of parliament (MP)
- John Gwynne (MP for Caernarvonshire) (died 1574), MP for Caernarvonshire (UK Parliament constituency)
- John Gwyn (MP for Cardigan) (fl. 1553 – c. 1567), MP for Cardigan (UK Parliament constituency)
- John Gwynne (MP for Wareham) (fl. 1572), MP for Wareham (UK Parliament constituency)

== People in sport ==
- John Tudor Gwynn ("Jack", 1881–1956), Irish cricketer and reporter in British India
- John David Gwynn (1907–1998), Irish cricketer and civil engineer
- John Gwynne (commentator) (1945–2022), British sport reporter and commentator

== Others ==
- John Gwynne (captain) (fl. 1660), Welsh soldier
- John Gwynn (architect) (1713–1786), British architect and civil engineer
- John Gwyn (philanthropist) (1755–1829), Derry linen merchant and benefactor
- John Wellington Gwynne (1814–1902), Canadian lawyer and Supreme Court judge
- John Gwynn (Syriacist) (1827–1917), Irish Syriacist and Anglican dean
- John Gwynne (author) (born 1968), British fantasy writer
