= Gulab Singh Lodhi =

Indian freedom fighter

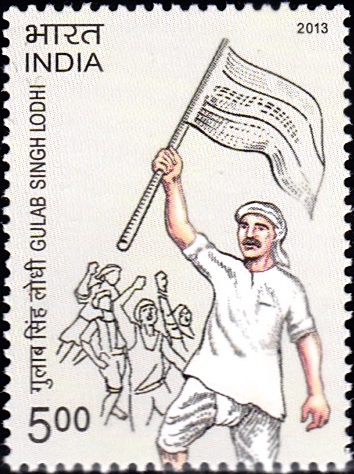
- A postal stamp of 'Gulab Singh Lodhi'
- Born: 1903; Unnao, Uttar Pradesh, India
- Died: 23 August 1935 (aged 32); Aminabad, Lucknow, India
- Father: Thakur Ram Ratan singh Lodhi
- Religion: Hinduism
- Occupation: Freedom Fighter

Gulab Singh Lodhi/Gulab Singh Lodha was a revolutionary who participated in the Indian independence movement. Memorial of Amar Shaheed Gulab Singh Lodhi is at "Jhande Wala Park" in Lucknow.

== Life ==
Gulab Singh Lodhi/Gulab Singh Lodha was born in the year 1903 at village named (Chandika Khera) Fatehpur Chaurasi, Unnao district in Uttar Pradesh. He was born in a Lodhi Rajput family. His father, Thakur Ram Ratan Singh Lodhi, was a farmer. Little is known about his childhood. He grew up in the turbulent era when the fervor of the freedom movement was at its peak. Lodhi took active part in the political activities against the British rule.

Gulab Singh Lodhi participated in a procession at Lucknow which marched to the Aminabad Park for hoisting the tri–colour in August 1935. The park was surrounded by British troops in order to prevent the hoisting of the flag. Gulab Singh Lodhi defied the show of armed force and climbed a tree with the Tricolour. As he was hoisting the flag atop the tree, he was shot dead by a British officer in August 1935. He died at Jhandewala Park in Aminabad, Lucknow.

== Legacy ==
Indian government issued a postal stamp in honour of 'Gulab Singh Lodhi' on 23 December of the year 2013.

A statue of him was erected in the park in 2004 but by 2009 was in a state of disrepair.
