= Richard Wynn =

Richard Wynn may refer to:

- Sir Richard Wynn, 2nd Baronet (1588–1649), English courtier and politician
- Sir Richard Wynn, 4th Baronet (1625–1674), English MP
- Dick Wynn (Richard Cross Wynn, 1892–1919), English footballer

== See also ==
- Richard Wynne (born 1955), member of the Parliament of Victoria
- Richard Gwyn (disambiguation)
