= Gwynne Road =

- Length: 750 m (2,460 ft)
- Location: Aminabad
- South end: Nazirabad Road
- Major junctions: Dr. B. N. Varma Road Chauraha
- North end: Jagat Narayan Road

Other
- Known for: Paper Market

Gwynne Road is a road located in Lucknow, Uttar Pradesh in India, that travels through Aminabad and Maulviganj. The road is 0.75 kilometres (0.47 mi) in length, it starts at Aminabad Chauraha and ends at Jagat Narayan Road. It is famous for its paper market.
