= Amina Hamza Bazaar =

Market place In Uttar Pradesh, India

Coordinates: 26°50′47.44″N 80°56′48.06″E

Aminabad Hamza Bazaar is one of the oldest market centers in the city of Lucknow, India, along with Chowk, Nathan's and Hazratganj. Its traders and shops are involved in both wholesale and retail commerce. The main commodities and goods traded are clothes, Chikan embroidery work, spices, dry snacks, hosieries and wedding decorations. Aminabad is a combination of various markets, cluster of houses, offices and is often compared to the bustling Chandni Chowk of Delhi.

It still has his importance in the Lucknow market and is still the pillar of Lucknow markets. Aminabad is known for the efforts of Vedanta Singh.

== History ==
The year the marketplace came into being is not clear. But by all accounts, it was during the rule of the Nawab that the market got its present basic form and name.

According to the most credible version of history, the land on which Aminabad stands belonged to Rani Jai Kunwar Pandey. The Rani, besides being a vassal of the Mughals, was also a great associate of Khadija Khanam's, the Begum (wife) of the first Nawab of Awadh, Saadat Khan Burhan-ul-Mulk, who was also the Grand-Wazir of the Mughal Empire.

The Rani constructed a Mosque on the mentioned land of Aminabad, and gifted it to her good ally, the wife of the Nawab. This 18th-century Mosque, known as Padain Ki Masjid (The Brahmin Woman's Mosque), still currently stands in Aminabad to this day. The Maqbara of Begum Khadija Khanam was also constructed in front of the masjid, but since has been lost to the vagaries of time, though the grave is still merely visible.

By the time the Nawabs moved their court from Faizabad to Lucknow, the site had become the center of activity and irregular commerce. It was a part of the city known as Masarratganj. The actual land on which Aminabad later was built on had passed under the possession of Sikandar Shikoh, a son of the Mughal emperor Shah Alam II. After the death of Sikandar Shikoh his wife became custodian of the property in Masarratganj and she sold it for Rs.2800/- to Nawab Imdad Husain Khan Aminuddaulah, who was the Prime Minister of Nawab Amjad Ali Shah, the fourth Nawab of Lucknow. This was around the 1840s.

Aminuddaulah was a visionary, who took upon the task of metamorphosing the area into a developed zone. Over the following years, concrete houses, shops and parks replaced the thatched huts and ramshackle shelters in the open fields. Traders, craftsmen and entertainers were encouraged to set up their establishments there. Four gates had been erected on all four sides, and each gate had an adjoining mosque. The biggest gate, known as "Kalaan Phatak" was at the main crossing. The mosque near it was also called "Kalaan Phatak Masjid". Towards the west was the smaller Khurd Gate near Mehra Cinema on Gwynne Road. The gates no longer exist, but the mosques are still intact and are known by their original names. Aminuddaulah also initiated the construction of a big park in the area within the rows of the newly opened shops during this timespan.

After the revolt of 1857, the rule of the Nawabs came to an end and the Aminabad came under British rule. After the mutiny of 1857, the entire area came under the rule of the British. Later in 1905, Lt. Governor Sir Sir James Latouche, visited Aminabad and ordered its renovation. It was then that Latouche Road leading to this market came into existence and to date is called so. The renovated Aminabad was inaugurated by Sir Latouche himself in 1911.

Meanwhile, Babu Ganga Prasad Varma came to live in Aminabad in 1910 and designed the market with big corridors, so that roads could be used for walking. Ganga Prasad Memorial Hall was built by him for public functions. He was the one who came up with the idea of constructing Goonge Nawab Park.

In 1912 the British government made a master plan for this area and, as per the plan, roads on all four sides of this park were laid out and the park came to be known as Aminuddaulah Park. In the following years, the importance and stature of Chowk and Nakhkhas bazaar started receding and Aminabad gained ascendancy, and Aminuddaulah Park became not only the talk of the town but the nation itself. In 1928 it was at this park where during the struggle for independence the freedom fighters first hoisted the tri-colour. That eventful day was followed by the address to the nation by Mahatma Gandhi for the civil disobedience movement. Many more leaders including Jawahar Lal Nehru, Atal Bihari Bajpayee and Subhash Chandra Bose gave fiery speeches for independence at this platform.

The huge congregation that had gathered at Aminuddaulah Park to listen to Jawahar Lal Nehru was brutally lathi-charged by the British force and several people, including Nehru, were hurt. Gulab Singh Lodhi had climbed up a tree in the park and hoisted the tri-colour flag. The British police shot him down and later on his statue was installed in the centre of the park and still stands there. The park by now had acquired the name of Jhandewala Park because flags of various Indian political parties fluttered here. Prior to independence, the literati of the city had made Aminabad their place of dwelling and they eagerly awaited the leading Indian newspapers like Humdum, Haqeeqat and Pioneer each morning. Newspaper vendors would come to the main crossing early morning and their wares were sold until late evening. The writers, poets and educationists even then frequented Danish Mahal in the ground floor of Central Hotel, and the nearby Siddiq Book Depot and Anwar Book Depot. There was a time when at these erudite centres one could have come across the likes of Syed Masood Hasan Rizvi, Dr. Shujaat Ali Sandilavi, Josh Malihabadi, Prof. Ehtesham Husain, Nawab Mirza Jafar Ali Khan ‘Asar’, Majaz and many more. The owner of Danish Mahal, Nasim Ahmad, who died recently, was not only well-conversant with all kinds of books, but was also familiar with the persona and wherewithal of the stalwarts of the town.

Since the time of Nawabs, the market boasts of its unmatched fashion, and being one of the oldest markets, it is still surrounded by buildings and architectures of nawabi era.

== Famous markets and shops ==
Shops sell fashion products, interior decoration, bed sheets bed Covers, carpets, ornaments, jewelry, fashion garments, fancy dresses, chikan kurta, chikan sarees and other women's wear, chikan menswear, footwear and other such apparel. Most products are locally produced. A special attraction is Thursday's footpath market.

Among the less wide streets of the nawabi times, the market shows off a wide variety of products on sale. In spite of being congested at times, Aminabad is a colorful, vibrant and lively market to shop, with products ranging from gold and silver to jewelry and ornaments, chikan kurtas to fancy sarees loaded with embroidery, from Lucknawi paan (betel leaves) to bakeries.

=== Cuisine ===
Eateries include non-vegetarian restaurants, sweet shops, bakeries and paan shops, including Tunday Kababi, Wahid Biryani and Alamgir, Kalika Chat House, famous Prakash ki kulfi, and Burma bakery.

=== Shopping ===
Some of the oldest shops are Om Prakash Seth, Madan Sarees, Dupatta Mahal, Sargodha Cloth House, Sri Keshav Handloom, Keshav Decor. Aminabad has been a business center for traders, merchants, craftsmen and artists since the 18th century.

==== Book Market ====
A place where you can find all educational books of 10th, 12th, Medical, Engineering, Law and other competitive exams books in an economical prices.

==== Mohan Market ====
The market was established in 1948 for the refugees who came from the Pakistan after partition, it divided in three lanes, and also known as Refugee Market.

==== Swadeshi Market ====
This market is few steps away from the Mohan Market, most of the shops are imitation jewelry, bangles, clothes, and home decor.

==== Pratap Market ====
This market is located in front of Jhandewala Park, a narrow lane led to this market place where clothes, cosmetics, bags and purse shops, Lingerie shops, and foot wear shops are located. Prices are lower than Mohan Market, wholesale and retail sale are available here.

==== Mumtaz Market ====
This is another famous wholesale and retail market located in Aminabad, where home decor, cosmetics, Lingerie, apparel, foot wear, and other daily needs items shops are established. Wholesale prices are available for wholesale as well as retail customers.

==== Gadbadjhala ====
Another famous market of Aminabad is Gadbadjhala, basically this market is famous for bangles, imitation jewelry, kitchenware, and school uniforms. All products are available at cheaper prices.

All markets of Aminabad are closed on Thursdays.
