= Maulviganj =

- Neighbourhood
- Country: India
- State: Uttar Pradesh
- City: Lucknow

Languages
  - Official: Hindi
- Time zone: UTC+5:30 (IST)
- PIN: 226018

Maulviganj (Hindi: मौलवीगंज, Urdu: مولوی گنج), is a commercial and residential locality in Lucknow. It was established by Asaf-ud-Daula.
