= Nathaniel McClean Gwynne =

US soldier

Nathaniel Gwynne
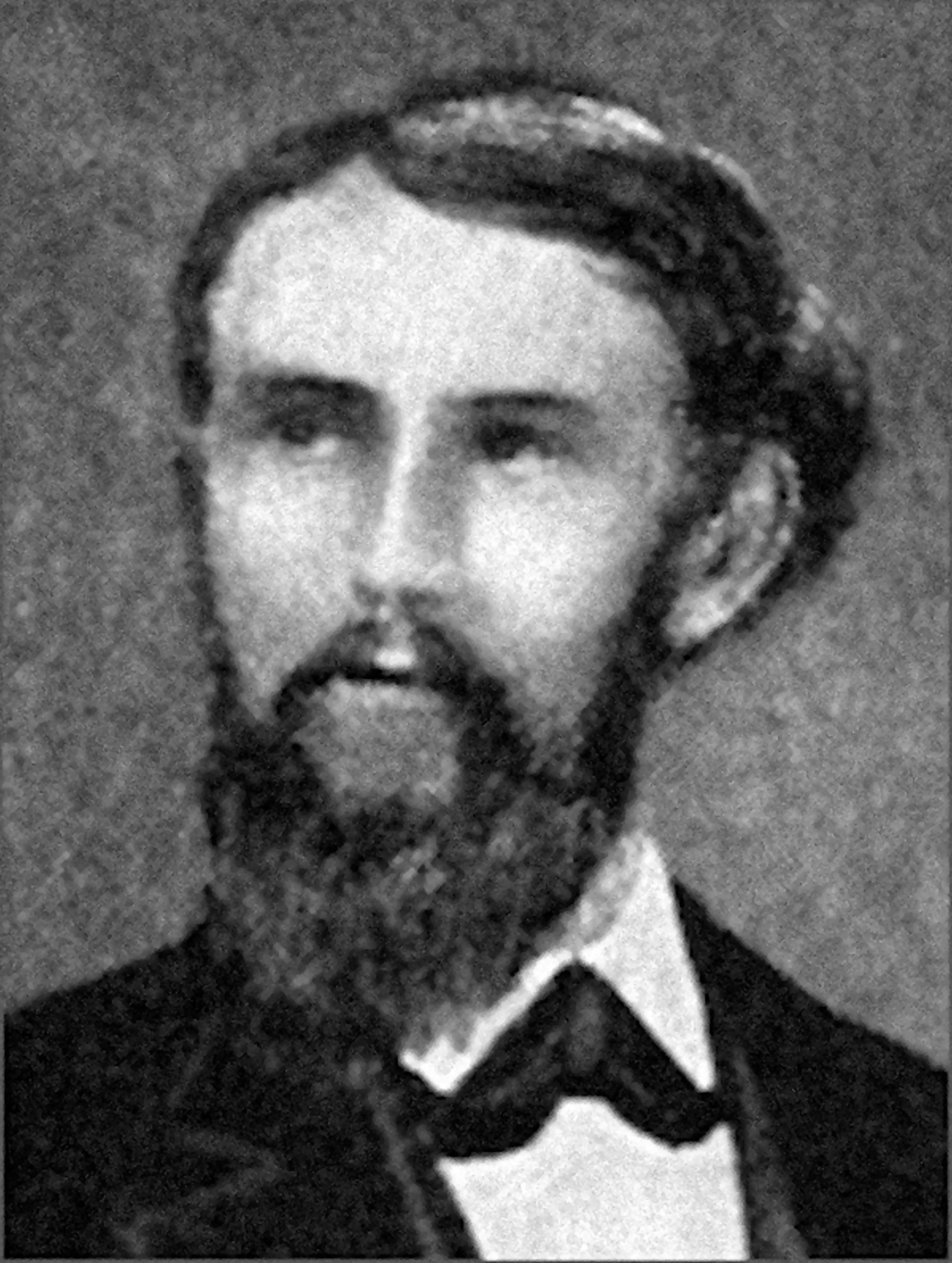
- Born: July 5, 1849; Urbana, Ohio
- Died: January 6, 1883 (aged 33)
- Burial place: Kansas City, Missouri
- Military career
- Allegiance: United States of America
- Branch: United States Army
- Rank: Private
- Units: Company H, 13th Ohio Volunteer Cavalry Regiment
- Conflicts: Battle of the Crater; American Civil War
- Awards: Medal of Honor

Private Nathaniel McClean Gwynne (July 5, 1849 - January 6, 1883) was an American soldier who fought in the American Civil War. Gwynee received his country's highest award for bravery during combat, the Medal of Honor. Gwynne's medal was won for his actions during the Battle of the Crater, part of the Siege of Petersburg. He was honored with the award on January 27, 1865.

Gwynee was from Urbana, Ohio, and entered service in Fairmount, Missouri.

== Medal of Honor citation ==
The President of the United States of America, in the name of Congress, takes pleasure in presenting the Medal of Honor to Private Nathaniel McClean Gwynne, United States Army, for extraordinary heroism on 30 July 1864, while serving with Company H, 13th Ohio Cavalry, in action at Petersburg, Virginia. When about entering upon the charge, Private Gwynne, then but 15 years old, was cautioned not to go in, as he had not been mustered. He indignantly protected and participated in the charge, his left arm being crushed by a shell and amputated soon afterward.

== See also ==
- List of American Civil War Medal of Honor recipients: G–L
