= Richard Gwyn =

Welsh Catholic martyr and bard

Saint Richard Gwyn
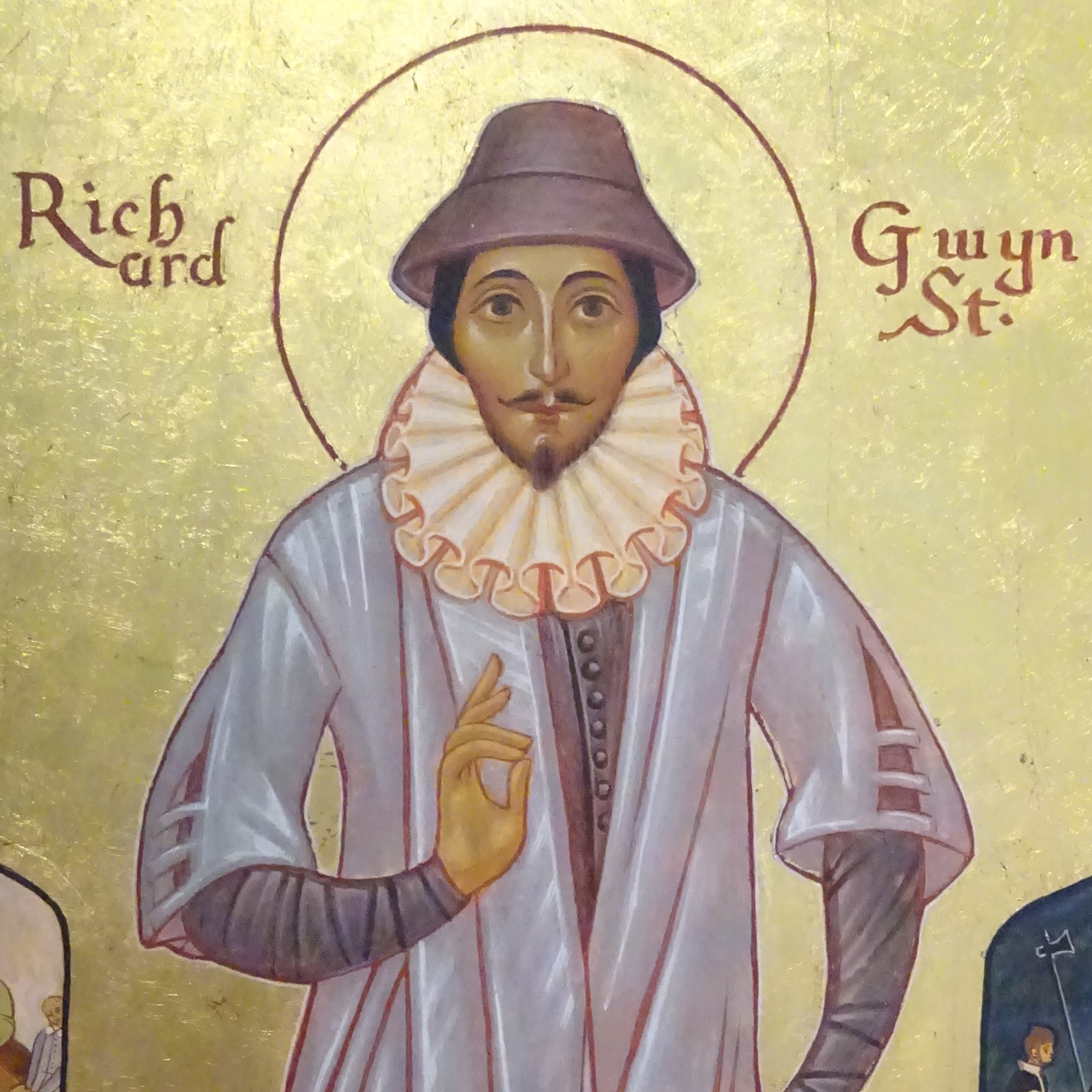
- Detail of a painting of Richard Gwyn in Wrexham Cathedral

Martyr
- Born: ca. 1537; Montgomeryshire, Wales
- Died: 15 October 1584 (aged 47); Wrexham, Wales
- Venerated in: Roman Catholic Church
- Beatified: 15 December 1929 by Pope Pius XI
- Canonized: 25 October 1970 by Pope Paul VI
- Major shrine: Wrexham Cathedral
- Feast: 4 May, 17 October, 25 October
- Patronage: Latin Mass Society of England and Wales, Roman Catholic Diocese of Wrexham, teachers, large families, parents of large families, torture victims

Richard Gwyn (ca. 1537 – 15 October 1584), also known by his anglicized name, Richard White, was a Welsh teacher at illegal and underground schools and a bard who wrote both Christian and satirical poetry in the Welsh language. A Roman Catholic during the reign of Queen Elizabeth I of England, Gwyn was martyred by being hanged, drawn and quartered for high treason at Wrexham in 1584. He was canonized by Pope Paul VI in 1970 as one of the Forty Martyrs of England and Wales. Since its creation in 1987, St. Richard Gwyn has been the Patron Saint of the Roman Catholic Diocese of Wrexham. Along with fellow lay martyr St. Margaret Clitherow, Gwyn is the co-patron of the Latin Mass Society of England and Wales.

== Early life ==
While little is known of Richard Gwyn's early life, it is known that he was born about 1537 in Llanidloes, Montgomeryshire, Wales and, reportedly, "descended of honest parentage, bearing the surname of Gwin (sic)."

Only at the age of 20, "he did frame his mind to like of good letters", and accordingly matriculated at Oxford University, "where he made no great abode", and did not complete a degree. He then went to St John's College, Cambridge, "where he lived on the charity of the College", and its then Master, the Roman Catholic Dr. George Bullock. During his time at University, Gwyn's fellow students began calling him by the alias of "Richard White", "as being the English equivalent of his name". In the early part of the reign of Elizabeth I, Bullock was forced to resign the mastership in July 1559 and Gwyn was forced to leave the college.

After leaving the university, Gwyn found that, "need and poverty compelled him to become a teacher before he could perfectly lay the foundation to be a learner," and returned to his native district in Wales. Gwyn served successively as schoolmaster in the Wrexham area villages of Gresford, Yswyd, and Overton-on-Dee while continuing his studies of the liberal arts, theology, and history.

Gwyn married Catherine, a young woman from Overton-on-Dee. They had six children, three of whom survived him.

Despite repeated threats of both fines and imprisonment, Gwyn made every effort to avoid attending Anglican Sunday Services and taking the Oath of Supremacy. As a recusant in a small village, Gwyn's adherence to the old faith was common knowledge. Gwyn also made no effort to hide his opinions and openly exhorted his neighbours who had conformed to return to the Catholic Church.

At the time, Bishops of the Established Church were under considerable pressure from Queen Elizabeth I to arrest recusants, especially schoolmasters, who exercised great influence and Welsh bards, who, like Richard Gwyn, were acting as secret messengers on behalf of Roman Catholic priests and recusants within the Welsh nobility and commons. In this way, the Bards of Wales were highly important within the Welsh Catholic underground and were how news was spread about secret Masses and pilgrimages.

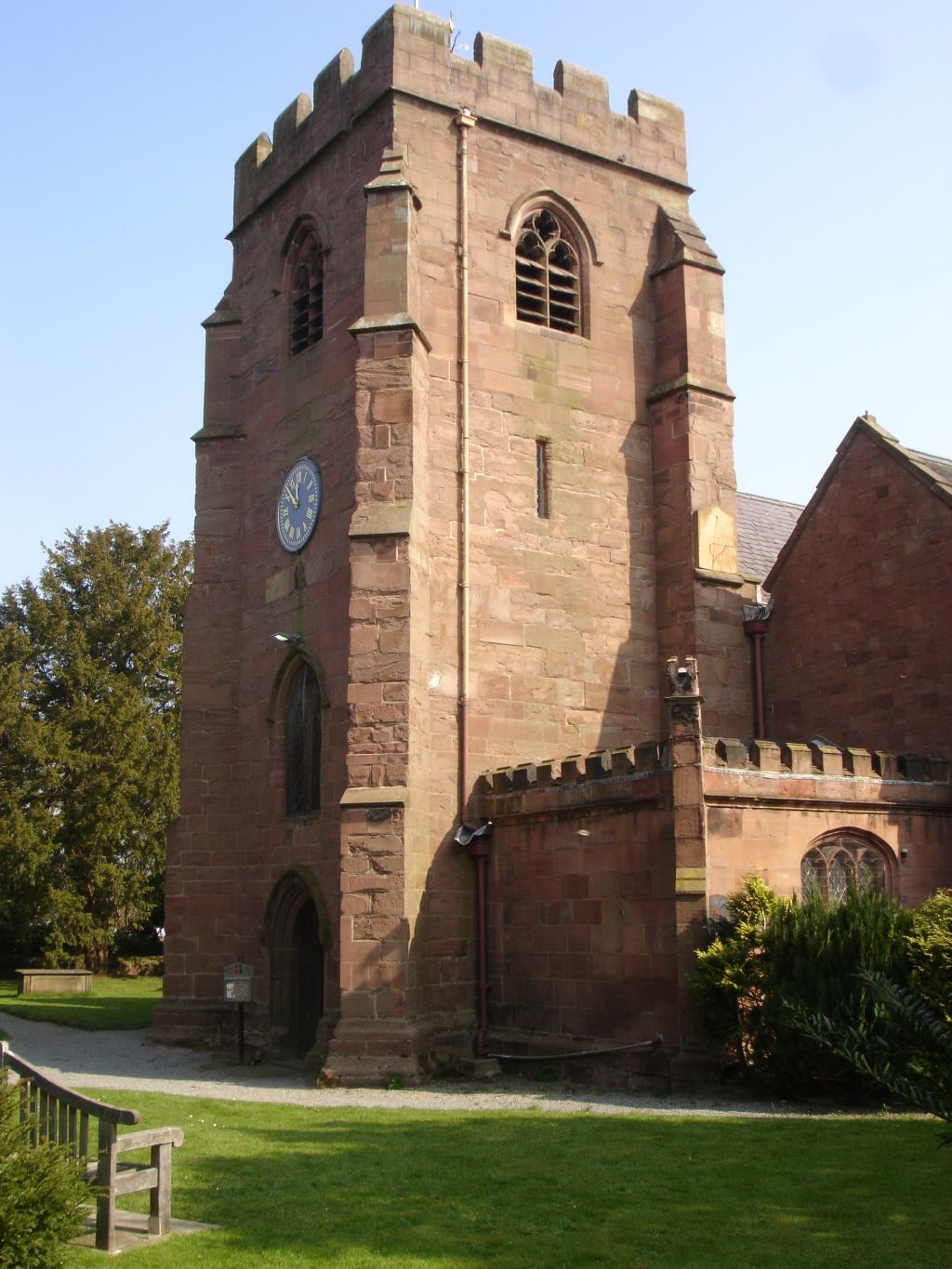
St. Mary the Virgin Church in Overton-on-Dee.

For these reasons, William Downham, a former Roman Catholic priest of the Augustinian Brothers of Penitence who had conformed to Anglicanism and been appointed by the Queen as Bishop of Chester, and his officers, "began to molest", Gwyn, "for refusing to receive at their communion table". The Bishop and local statesman Roger Puleston put considerable pressure upon Gwyn, who reluctantly agreed, "greatly against his stomach", to receive Communion at Anglican services the following Sunday. The next Sunday, however, as Gwyn left St. Mary the Virgin Church in Overton-on-Dee following the Anglican service there, he was assaulted and pecked all the way back to his home by a flock of crows and kites. Soon after, Gwyn became so gravely ill that his life was despaired of. Gwyn promised God that if his life were spared, he would return to the Catholic Faith and never again violate his conscience by attending services at a Protestant church. Soon after, seminary priests, including Robert Gwin, began arriving in North Wales from Catholic Europe. Gwyn made his Confession and returned to the religion of his childhood.

Incensed by Gwyn's return to Catholicism, Bishop Downham and the Protestants of Overton made Gwyn's life so unbearable that the schoolmaster and his family fled the Diocese of Chester on foot. After crossing the River Dee and finding a new home in Erbistock, Gwyn set up the Welsh equivalent to an Irish hedge school inside a deserted barn, where he secretly taught the children of local Catholic families. In time, however, Gwyn was forced to flee from Erbistock as well to avoid arrest.

On a Wednesday night early in 1579, Richard Gwyn was arrested by the Vicar of Wrexham, Hugh Soulley a former Roman Catholic priest who had conformed to Anglicanism and married, during a visit to the city's Cattle Market. Gwyn was confined to Wrexham Jail, where he was offered his liberty if he would conform to the Established Church. When he refused, Gwyn was told that he would appear before the magistrates the following day. That very night, Gwyn escaped and remained a fugitive for a year and a half.

== Imprisonment ==
=== Recapture ===
After eighteen months on the run, Gwyn was on the way one afternoon in July 1580 into Wrexham in order to deliver a secret message that a priest was urgently needed. During his journey, Gwyn was recognized on the public highway by David Edwards, a wealthy Puritan cloth merchant. Even though English law at the time did not permit what is now called a citizen's arrest, Edwards ordered Gwyn to stop. When the latter refused, Edwards drew his dagger and attacked Gwyn, who defended himself with his staff and struck the Puritan such a severe blow on the head that Edwards was thrown to the ground. Gwyn thought at first that he had killed Edwards and stood in silent horror until the Puritan began showing signs of life. Gwyn then took to his heels. Edwards followed in pursuit and cried, "Stop thief! Stop thief!" The Puritan's servants were cutting hay nearby and, hearing their master's cries, they surrounded Gwyn and seized him.

David Edwards brought Gwyn into his own house, and kept him there in heavy bolts and chains while the magistrates were summoned. After the magistrates took charge of him, Gwyn was taken to Wrexham prison and lodged in an underground dungeon known as "The Black Chamber" (Middle Welsh: Siambrddu).

After laying on the cold ground in the Black Chamber for two days, Gwyn was brought before the Justice of the Peace, Robert Puleston, who ordered that Gwyn be sent to Ruthin Castle and, "very straitly guarded as being vehemently suspected of high treason." For this reason, Gwyn spent his first three months in Ruthin Castle wearing, "strong handbolts on his arms, and a huge pair of bolts on both heels, which were so placed that he could not lie on his side, but, whenever he would sleep, must needs lie on his back or his belly."

At the Michaelmas Assizes in 1580, Gwyn was offered his freedom if he would agree to attend Anglican services and to give up the names of the Catholic parents in Erbistock whose children he had taught. Gwyn refused and was returned to Ruthin Castle. By this time, however, Gwyn's jailer, "understanding that he had merely a prisoner for religion to deal with, remitted some part of his former rigour towards him."

Around Christmas 1580, all the prisoners at Ruthin Castle were transferred to Wrexham Jail, where the new jailer greeted Gwyn, "with a great pair of shackles, which was compelled to wear both night and day all the year following."

When brought before the next Assizes, Gwyn again refused to conform.

=== "Brawling in Church" ===
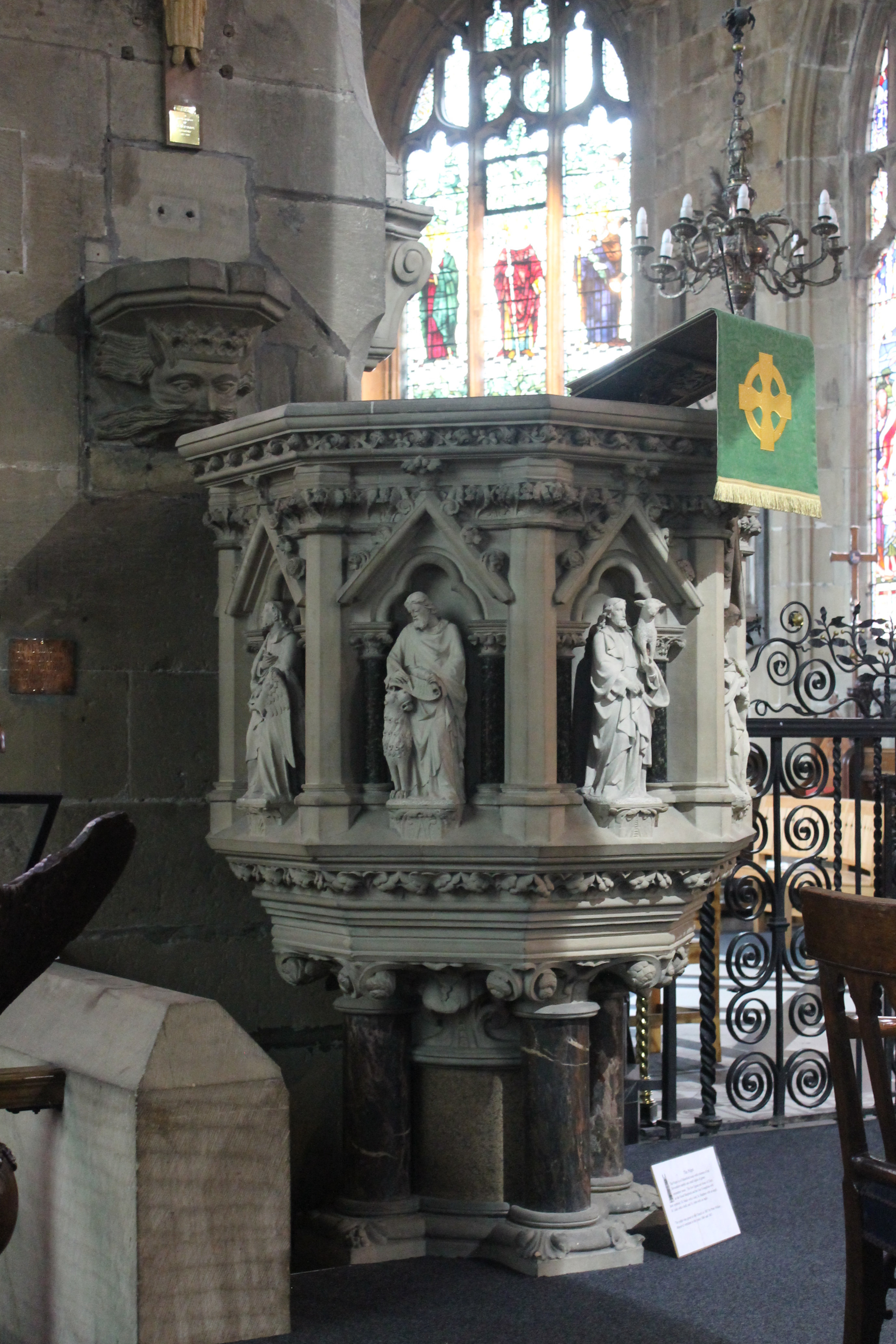
The Pulpit of St Giles' Church in Wrexham

When the May Assizes were held at Wrexham in 1581, the Chief Justice of Chester, Sir George Bromley, ordered that Gwyn be "taken to church" by force. Gwyn was carried upon the shoulders of six men into St. Giles' Church in Wrexham. Gwyn was carried around the font and laid in heavy shackles before the pulpit to hear the sermon of an Anglican clergyman named Thomas Jones. However, Gwyn, "so stirred his legs that with the noise of his irons the preacher's voice could not be heard." Sir George Bromley ordered that, as punishment, Gwyn was to be placed in the stocks between 10:00am and 8:00pm and sermonized the whole time by Anglican ministers. One Anglican clergyman, who had a very large red nose, attempted to debate with Gwyn concerning the Keys of the Church, which the minister alleged were given just as much to him as to St. Peter the Apostle. "There is this difference", Gwyn replied, "namely, that whereas Peter received the Keys to the Kingdom of Heaven, the keys you received were obviously those of the beer cellar."

At 8:00 pm, Gwyn was finally released from the stocks and limped back to his cell, followed the whole way by the jeering laughter of David Edwards, the Puritan cloth merchant who had arrested him.

At his next court appearance, Gwyn learned he had been indicted and would be tried for the additional charge of "brawling during divine service." However, as James Garm, the clerk of court, began to read the indictment before the jury, he found himself unable to continue doing so and handed it to someone else. When Sir George asked Garm what was the matter, the clerk replied, "I do not know what has happened to my eyes, but I cannot see." Bromley replied, "Speak softly lest the Papists make a miracle of that." Richard Gwyn was found guilty by the jury and fined one hundred marks (£140).

In September 1581, Gwyn was moved to Denbigh Castle and was again brought before Sir George Bromley. Gwyn was fined £280 for refusing to attend Anglican Sunday Services under the penal statute setting the fine for that offence at £20 per month. This fine was in addition to Gwyn's previous fine of £140 for "brawling during divine service". Gwyn replied that he had some funds and could make some payment toward his fines. When Bromley asked what amount he could pay, Gwyn answered, "Six-pence". Outraged, Bromley ordered that Gwyn be returned to prison with extra irons.

=== Three recusants ===
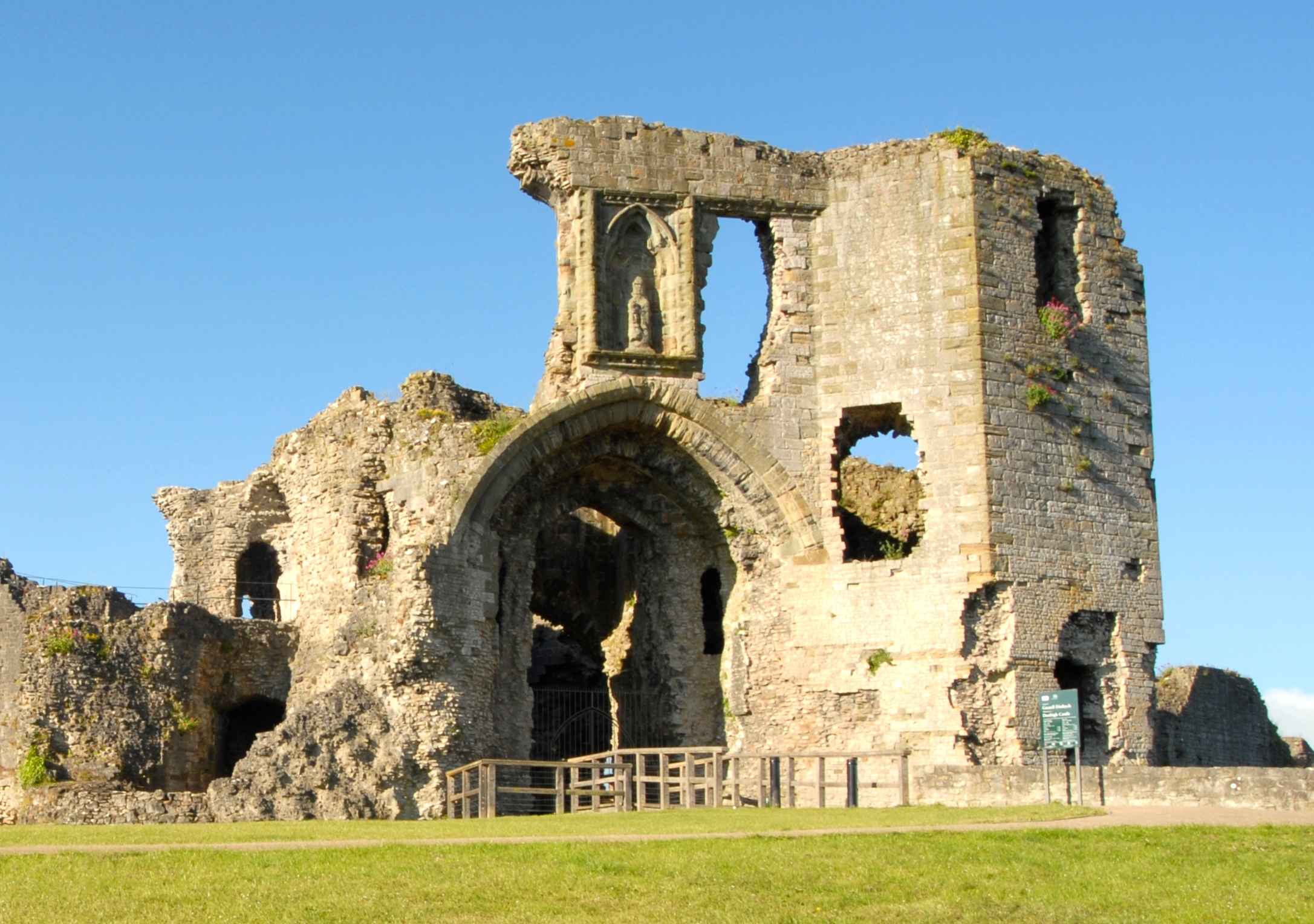
Denbigh Castle's gatehouse, showing the Porter's Lodge Tower (left) and the Prison Tower (right)

At that same assizes, Gwyn was soon joined at Denbigh Castle by two other Catholic prisoners, John Hughes and Robert Morris. In the spring of 1582, they were returned to Wrexham and brought before the Assizes. Instead of being charged or tried with an offence, the judge had ordered that the three recusants were to hear a sermon by an Anglican clergyman, whose name does not survive, but who is described as a Zwinglian and as the illegitimate son of a Roman Catholic priest. "Their complaint to the judges proving vain", all three prisoners started to heckle the minister (one in Welsh, the second in Latin, and the third in English) until the whole exercise had to be abandoned.

At the same assizes, a complaint was filed against the sheriff, Edward Hughes of the Holt, alias Edward ap Thomas, for showing allegedly excessive leniency towards the three recusant prisoners. In response, a committee of four overseers was appointed, which included both Hugh Soulley and David Edwards, "in order to see to it that no one had access to the prisoners except their wives, and that no relief was given them."

From his position on the committee, Puritan cloth merchant David Edwards continued his persecution of Richard Gwyn. On one occasion, as Gwyn was standing in irons and holding his infant child at the door of Wrexham Jail, Edwards crossed the road and threw Gwyn backward onto the stones. It is said that Edwards left the imprint of the nails on his boots upon Gwyn's face and severely endangered the infant's life.

On another occasion, Edwards instructed his wife and daughter to testify before Judge Jevan Lloyd of Yale (Plas yn Iâl) that they had seen Richard Gwyn outside Wrexham Jail. The jailor, however, M. Coytmore was able to prove in court that the man they had seen outside the Jail was Judge Jevan Lloyd, rather than Richard Gwyn.

When the Michaelmas Assizes were held at Holt in 1582, Gwyn, Hughes, and Morris were indicted and tried for high treason based on the allegedly perjured testimony of Lewis Gronow of Meriadoc and Robert Clarke, the new Vicar of Wrexham. The case for the prosecution, however, seems to have broken down. Also, that following Christmas, the new sheriff, Jevan Lloyd of Yale, relieved the committee of overseers of their offices and loaded Gwyn, Hughes, and Morris down with heavy irons.

=== Torture ===
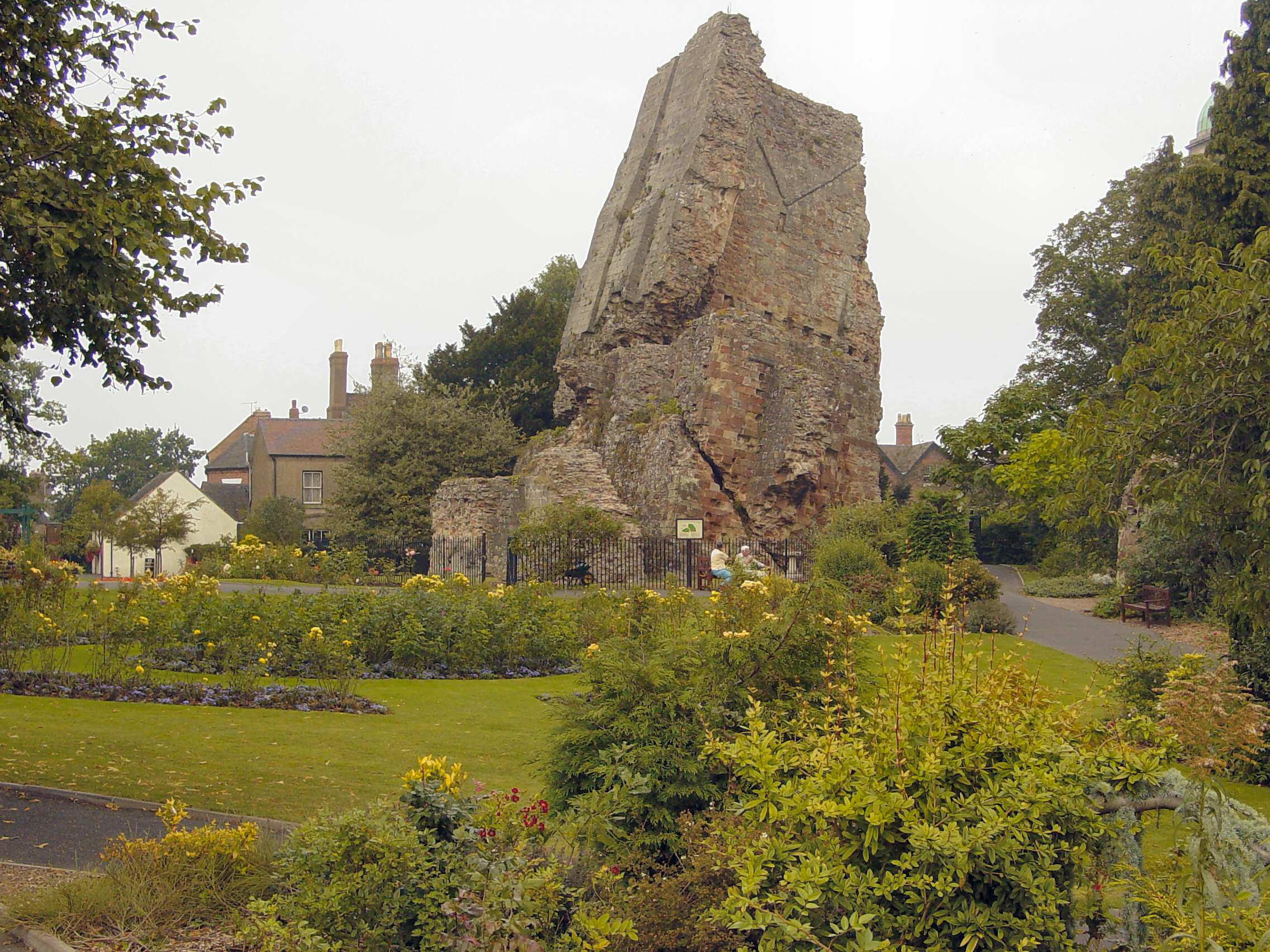
The ruins of Bridgnorth Castle as they appear today

In May 1583 an order was given for the removal of Gwyn, Hughes, and Morris to the jurisdiction of the Council of Wales and the Marches along with the Roman Catholic priest John Bennett and the layman Henry Pugh. The following November, all five suffered torture at Bewdley and at Bridgnorth Castle by being, "laid to the manacles (a kind of torture at the Council, not inferior to the rack at the Tower of London)."

At about seven or eight on the morning of 27 November 1583, Gwyn was interrogated by Richard Atkyns, the Attorney-General of Wales and the Marches, at the latter's own home. In particular, Atkyns demanded to know Gwyn's opinion of the 1570 papal bull Regnans in Excelsis, in which Pope Pius V had declared Queen Elizabeth I excommunicated and deposed for both heresy and religious persecution of the Catholic Church in England and Wales as well as in Ireland. Gwyn replied, "Notwithstanding that Bull (the which I never saw), I believe and confirm that she is our lawful Queen."

Atkyns, however, was unmoved and, from nine o'clock in the morning until dinner time that very day, Gwyn was tortured by being put to the manacles. According to a contemporary account, Gwyn "bestowed all the time of his torments in continual prayer, by craving of God for his tormentors mercy and forgiveness, and for himself safe deliverance from their malice by the merits of Jesus Christ His Passion; and this he did with a loud voice."

It is written, however, that Gwyn's interrogators, "seemed to be tormented with his words, as if they were possessed". Sir George Bromley responded in a rage, "There is no more pity to be had on thee than a mad dog! Wretches like you should all be hanged!"

Gwyn replied, "I pray you put me to death... and therein you shall do me greater pleasure than to kill me continually with torments."

Gwyn then fell to praying in silence and made no further answer to the demands of the interrogators, until at dinnertime, the interrogators finally took Gwyn down and left him alone with the manacles. Immediately after dinner, Gwyn was visited by the Councillors of Wales and the Marches; Sir George Bromley, Henry Townsend, Fabian Phillips, William Leighton of Plaish Hall, and Simon Thelwall. They were accompanied by deputy solicitor Thomas Evans and Thomas Sherer, the Keeper of the Judicial Seal of Montgomery and Examiner before the Council of the Marches. After a brief examination, the Councillors departed and Sherer continued the interrogation accompanied by threats of further torture. Although Gwyn remained in the same room with the manacles for two hours afterwards and fully expected to be laid to them a second time, "God protected him from any further cruelty at that time."

Soon afterwards, Gwyn, Hughes, and Morris were returned to Wrexham Jail, where the 1584 spring assizes were allowed to proceed without any further efforts to prosecute them.

== Trial ==
=== Preliminary hearing ===
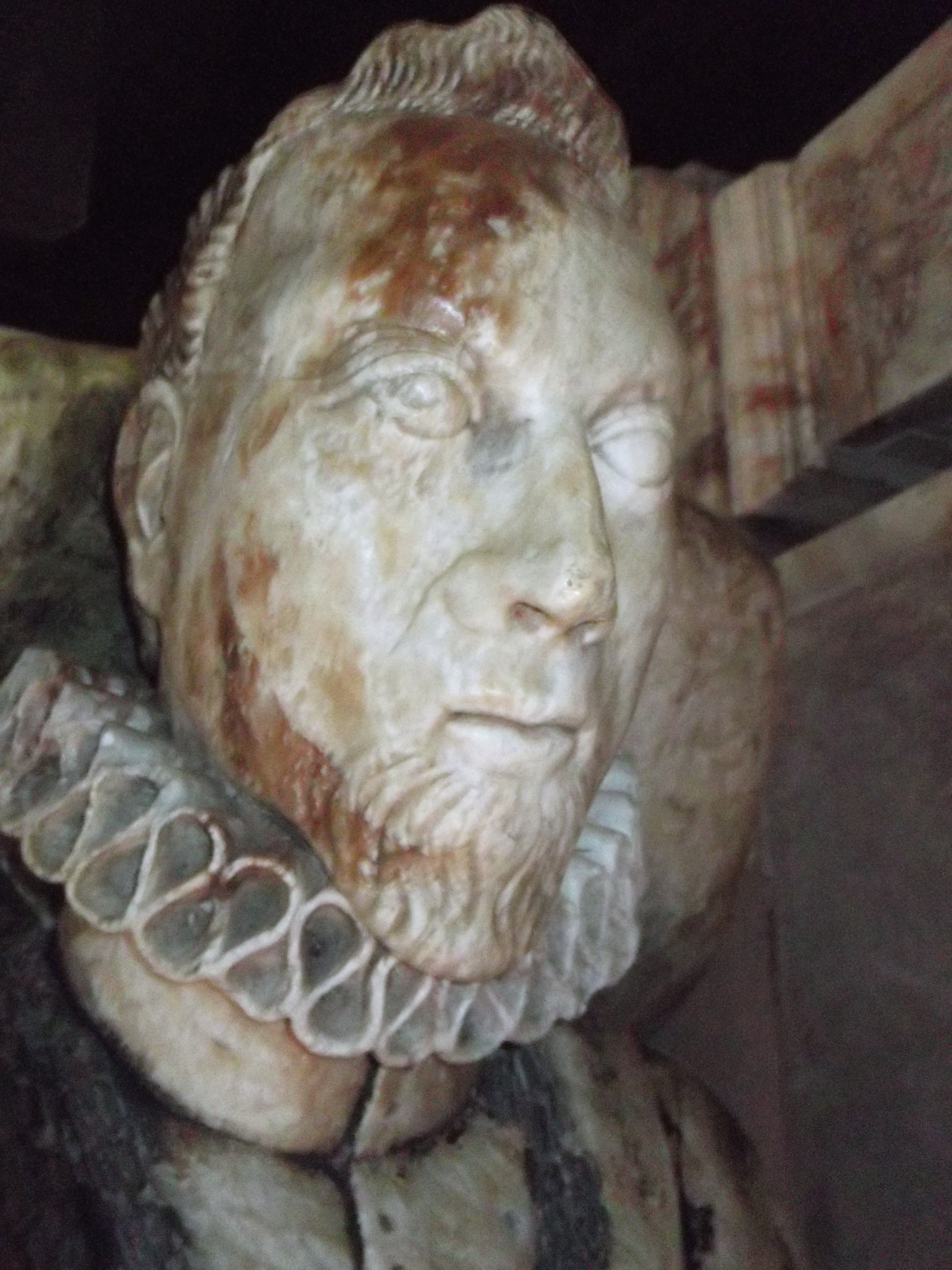
The effigy of Sir George Bromley on his tomb in the church of St Peter the Apostle, Worfield, Shropshire. His epitaph describes him as "a Just man and a Great professor of the Religion now established."

On Friday 9 October 1584, Richard Gwyn, John Hughes, and Robert Morris were arraigned at Wrexham before a panel of judges headed by the Chief Justice of Chester, Sir George Bromley, as well as Simon Thelwall, Piers Owen, Dr. Ellis Price, Roger Puleston, Jevan Lloyd of the Yale, and Owen Brereton. Upon coming before the court, Gwyn made the Sign of the Cross, "for which he was mocked and derided by a young man named Francis Bromley, a relative of the Chief Justice."

As the indictment was read aloud by the clerk of court, all three prisoners learned that they stood accused of high treason under the Act of Supremacy 1558 and the Religion Act 1580. Like all other British subjects tried for the same offence prior to the Treason Act 1695, Richard Gwyn, John Hughes, and Robert Morris were forbidden the services of a defence counsel and forced to act as their own attorneys.

When the prisoners were asked by the court how they wished to be tried, Gwyn responded, "We will be tried by you, who are the justices of the bench; for you are wise and learned, and better able to discern the equity of our cause than the simple people of our own country, altogether unacquainted in such matters."

It has been suggested that Gwyn's reason for requesting a bench trial rather than a trial by jury, "was to save the jury from the guilt of his blood, but no notice was taken of his request, as was inevitable, and a jury was empanelled."

According to Malcolm Pullan, "No one wished to sit on the jury so a collection of the local anti-Catholic riff-raff had to be paid to do jury service."

=== Testimony ===
Lewis Gronow deposed "that the said three prisoners were in hand with him on a Sunday in July an. Dom. 1582, to become a Papist; secondly that he had heard them also to acknowledge", Pope Pius V, "to be the Supreme Head of the Church; thirdly, that he had heard" Richard Gwyn "in plain terms to affirm the Pope now living to have the same authority which Christ gave to Peter."

Edward Erles also "deposed that he had heard" Gwyn "rehearse certain rhymes of his own making against married priests and ministers; secondly, that he called the Bible a babble; thirdly that he termed Justice Bromley ustus y fram; and fourth that he defended the Pope's authority."

Howell David, the cousin of Gwyn's codefendant John Hughes, deposed against Gwyn, "that he had heard him complain of this world; and secondly, that it would not last long, thirdly, that he hoped to see a better world; and, fourthly, that he confessed the Pope's supremacy." The same witness also gave evidence against his own kinsman John Hughes and, very likely for this reason, Howell David "had managed to secure his property."

The three prisoners then pointed out that Lewis Gronow, witness for the prosecution, had previously been upon the pillory for procuring the perjured testimony of Mr. Tudor Robert in another case. Richard Gwyn also denied ever having met Lewis Gronow.

John Hughes then called a witness of his own, who asserted that both Lewis Gronow and Edward Erles had been bribed with sixteen shillings each for bearing false witness in a previous case.

According to Malcolm Pullan, "The jury were understandably disturbed by this revelation, but the trial continued."

An Elizabethan English account of the trial "corroborates this and says that the money was given them by Jevan Lloyd of Yale, the year he was Sheriff" and their perjured testimony on promise of bribery had been arranged by the Vicar of Wrexham.

In response, however, Justice Simon Thelwall, "asked various questions", of the defendants, "with a view of showing the jury that all three prisoners were obstinate Papists". Thelwall then, "roved over the insurrection in the north", the excommunication of the Queen by Pope Pius V in the papal bull Regnans in excelsis, "Story and Felton", Nicholas Sanders and the Second Desmond Rebellion, "Campion and his fellows, Arden and Sommerfield, Francis Throckmorton; aggravating the prisoners to be of one religion with the person's before named and recited". In response, Gwyn, Hughes, and Morris, "protested their innocence."

=== Deliberation and verdict ===
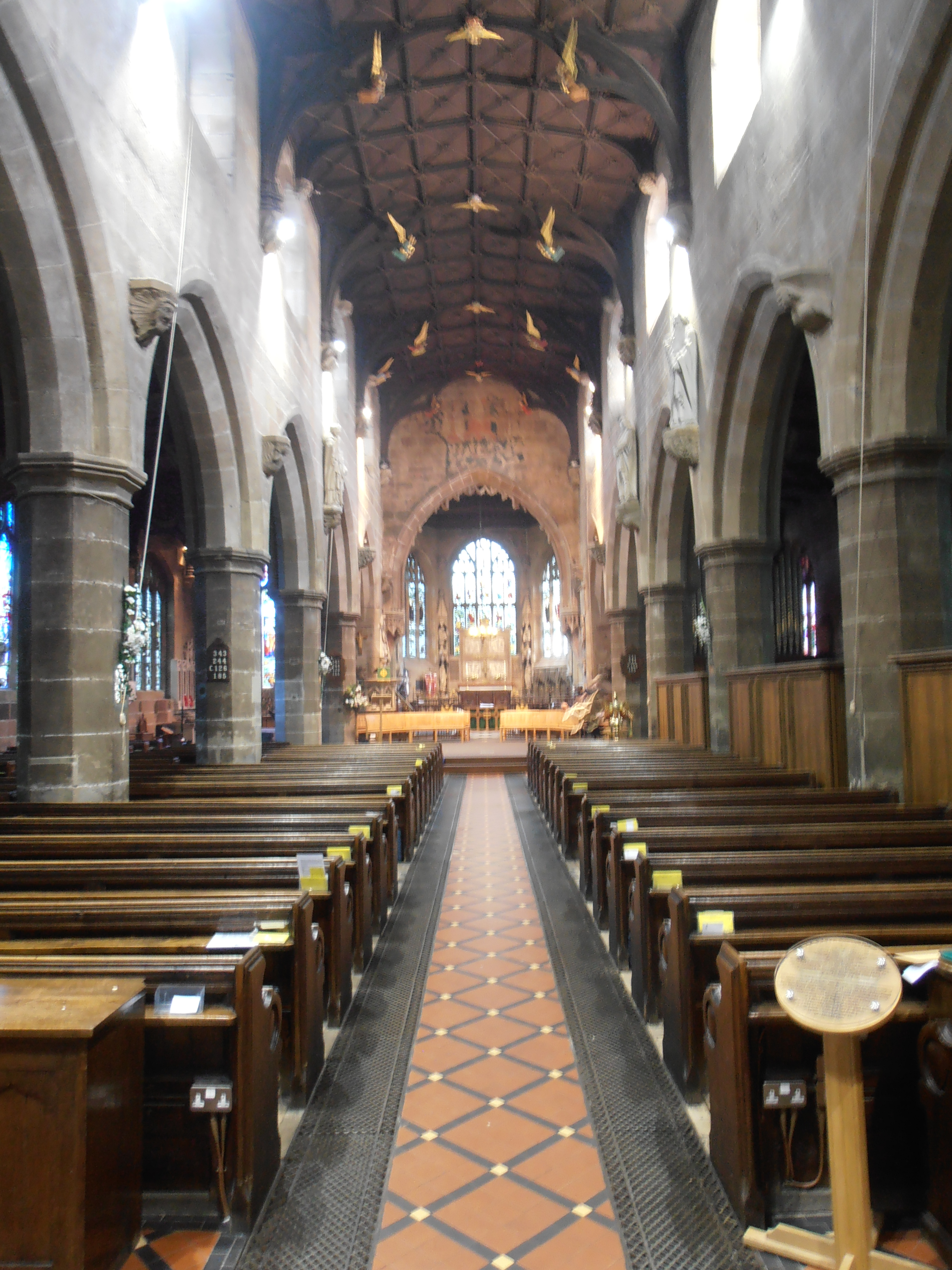
The Interior of St. Giles' Church in Wrexham.

The jury was reportedly so visibly unhappy with the contradictory evidence they had heard that, before they retired for deliberation, Sir George Bromley threatened them "with dire consequences if they did not bring in a guilty verdict after they retired for the night". Sir George also, "appointed the pronotary to read the commission from the Privy Council"; which was signed by Sir Thomas Bromley, the Lord Chancellor, Sir Henry Sidney, Lord President of the Marches, Sir Francis Walsingham, the Queen's Principal Secretary, Sir James Croft, and many other senior officials. This further had the effect of, "terrifying the simple men with the sight of the commission from higher powers". The jury then retired for their deliberations to St Giles' Church, where they remained with their keeper the whole night following.

After an hour of deliberation, however, two members of the jury "were sent for to confer with the judges, to know of them, whom they should acquit, and whom they should find guilty."

At 8:00 AM on Saturday 10 October 1584, the jury returned with a verdict. Richard Gwyn and John Hughes were found guilty of high treason. Robert Morris "was acquitted to his great sorrow" and publicly wept.

Gwyn replied to the verdict by saying in Ecclesiastical Latin, Non audent aliter dicere propter metum Judeorum ("They dare not say otherwise for fear of the Jews"), a reference to John 7:13.

=== Sentencing ===
As Sir George Bromley was absent, Simon Thelwall then proceeded to pass sentence. John Hughes was reprieved and Richard Gwyn was condemned to death by hanging, drawing and quartering upon the following Thursday, 15 October 1584. As the capital sentence was being pronounced upon him, Richard Gwyn, "did not change countenance". When the judge was finished, Gwyn calmly asked, "What is all this? Is it any more than one death?"

Catherine Gwyn and Mrs. John Hughes then arrived, each carrying a newborn baby, both of whom had recently been conceived by the defendants due to the Jailer, Mr. Coytmore, who had granted both recusants an unauthorized parole in order to visit their wives.

As Judge Thelwall proceeded to admonish both women not to follow their husbands' example, Catherine Gwyn angrily replied, "If you lack blood, you may take my life as well as my husband's; and if you will give the witnesses a little bribe, you may call them; they will bear evidence against me as well as they did against him." Mrs. Hughes spoke similarly, and both women were accordingly imprisoned for contempt of court, but soon afterwards were released on bail.

== Death ==
=== Last days ===
On Tuesday 13 October 1584 Richard Gwyn was visited in Wrexham Jail by "a gentleman", who, "in the Sheriff's name offered to discharge him of all his troubles, if he would acknowledge the Queen Supreme Head of the Church within her own dominions; but the man, being constant, refused to purchase his own liberty so dear." On the same day Gwyn, "sent his signet or seal of brass off his finger to a gentleman, his very familiar friend."

On Wednesday 14 October 1584 Catherine Gwyn visited her husband, who blessed and kissed twenty-four silk laces, which were coloured white as a pun regarding his surname. Gwyn instructed his wife to give twelve of the laces as gifts in his name to twelve underground Roman Catholic priests. Gwyn then instructed his wife to give the other dozen laces as gifts to twelve members of the local Welsh nobility, "to whom he was greatly beholden.

Gwyn then bent a single penny, which he blessed and instructed his wife to deliver to his spiritual director. Gwyn also "caused his garters to be given [to] two priests of his very familiar acquaintance."

=== Final day ===
On the morning of Thursday 15 October 1584 Catherine Gwyn saw the Puritan cloth merchant David Edwards passing by Wrexham Jail and cried out, "God be a righteous judge between thee and me!" According to a contemporary account, however, Richard Gwyn, "rebuked her, saying that, if they did not forgive now freely, all their labours would be lost."

At about 10:00 in the morning, Gwyn heard, a great noise in the backside of", Wrexham Jail and demanded to know what it was. He was told that it was Mrs. Coytmore, the Jailer's wife, making, "lamentation for him".

The Coytmores had grown very fond of Richard Gwyn during his imprisonment and, possibly as punishment for his many acts of leniency, Mr. Coytmore had been ordered to act as Gwyn's executioner.

Despite this, however, when he learned of the reason for Mrs. Coytmore's weeping, Gwyn said to his wife, "I pray thee, Catherine, go and comfort her."

As Catherine left to fulfill his request, Gwyn went down to the ground floor of Wrexham Jail. Even though this was, according to Malcolm Pullan, the level as, "where common thieves were kept", all of the prisoners, among whom were "diverse children", were weeping over Gwyn's execution. Gwyn laid his hands upon the head of each prisoner and, "prayed God to bless them". Gwyn then beheld a large number of people outside the jail, who had also come to say goodbye to him. Reaching his hands through the window, Gwyn grasped each person by the hand and took leave of them one by one. One local member of the Welsh nobility who had been Gwyn's pupil, especially "made great lamentations", but Gwyn told him, "Weep not for me, for I do but pay the rent before the rent-day."

Gwyn then distributed five shillings in small silver coins, which a local recusant had sent to be given away by Gwyn's own hands, to the poor from the door of Wrexham Jail. Before leaving for the place of execution, Gwyn gave his wife eleven shillings and his rosary, which, according to a contemporary account, "was all the wealth he left her."

Soon after, the Sheriff, Piers Owen, came in to tell Gwyn to prepare for death. Gwyn kissed his wife and Mrs. John Hughes goodbye and blessed his infant son, who was only one month old, by making the Sign of the Cross upon his forehead.

John Hughes and Robert Morris asked leave to be present at Gwyn's execution, which was refused. So instead, all four knelt to receive his blessing. Gwyn prayed for God to stand by them and then went to the sled which had been provided, instead of a hurdle, to drag him to the place of execution.

=== Martyrdom ===
As Gwyn stepped through the prison door, he said, "In the name of Jesus". Upon arriving at the sled, he first made the Sign of the Cross before his arms were tied behind his back. As Gwyn was laid upon the sled, a heavy rain began to fall and continued until the moment of Gwyn's death. Meanwhile, Gwyn prayed the rosary the whole way to the gallows, "using the end of a string wherewith he held up his irons instead of beads."

As Gwyn arrived at the gallows, which had been erected in the Beast Market of Wrexham, he turned to the people and said, "God is merciful to us; behold the elements shed tears for our sins."

Gwyn then climbed the ladder to the gallows, where Mr. Coytmore, who had been ordered to serve as the executioner, knelt down and asked for his forgiveness. Gwyn replied, "I do forgive thee before God, and I wish thee no more harm than I wish my own heart."

Owen Brereton then asked Gwyn if he would like a priest. Gwyn replied, "Yea, with all my heart, but I will have no minister."

Sheriff Piers Owen then asked Gwyn, "whether he repented of his treasons and asked the Queen's forgiveness". Gwyn replied, "I never committed any treasons against her any more than your father or grandfather did, unless it be treason to fast and pray."

The Vicar of Wrexham then asked Gwyn, "if he acknowledged the Queen's supremacy over the Church", and Gwyn replied, "that he acknowledged her to be lawful Queen of England".

Stunned, the Vicar asked why Gwyn had not mentioned this at his trial. Gwyn responded, "The question was not asked me; but I told the Council at another time that I was her poor subject, and that I prayed for Her Majesty. Mine examinations are to be seen, and my hand to the same; search the records, and you shall find this to be true. Moreover, that I offered to go out of the realm to pleasure them, or into rocks and deserts, yea, if it were possible, under the ground, to use my conscience in the least offensive manner I might, or into whatever place it might pleasure my Prince to send me; but nothing will serve."

Addressing the crowd, Gwyn expressed his forgiveness of David Edwards and all others who had harmed him. He requested the prayers of all those present. Gwyn then addressed the crowd, saying, "My dear countrymen, remember your souls and do not lose them for this vile transitory muck which Christ hath so dearly bought. This is but one hour's pain to me. And what is that in respect to the torments of Hell which shall never have an end?"

The Sheriff then ordered Coytmore to proceed and all those present fell to their knees to pray for Gwyn. Coytmore allowed Gwyn to continue exhorting all those present to reconcile themselves to the Catholic Church. Coytmore again asked Gwyn's forgiveness and Gwyn replied by kissing the executioner's hand and saying, "I do forgive thee with all my heart; God and our Blessed Lady and St. Michael forgive thee; it is all one to me that thou do this deed as another."

Just before the ladder was turned from under him and Gwyn was hanged, he turned to the crowd and also said, "I have been a jesting fellow, and if I have offended any that way, or by my songs, I beseech them for God's sake to forgive me."

Gwyn then said in Ecclesiastical Latin, "Deus propitius esto mihi peccatori!" ("God, be merciful to me a sinner!"), a quote of Luke 18:13. And the ladder was turned out from under him. For some time he hung silently, beating his breast with both hands. Meanwhile, Mr. Coytmore pulled upon Gwyn's shackles, in which he had been hanged, in the hope of putting him out of his pain.

Fully aware of the Jailer's intentions, Sheriff Piers Owen ordered Mr. Coytmore to cut Gwyn down as soon as he was unconscious. As the inexperienced Mr. Coytmore made a mess of disembowelling the prisoner and burning his entrails before his face, Richard Gwyn revived, but made no sound and continued to beat his breast in penitence, "until the sheriff's men held his arms back by force." At last, Gwyn raised his head, looked down at his own mangled torso, and cried out in Middle Welsh, "O Duw gwyn pybeth y diw hun?!" ("Holy God, what is this?!")

M. Coytmore answered, "It is the execution of the Queen's Majesty."

Richard Gwyn then said his last words, also in Welsh, mere moments before his head was severed, ""Iesu, trugarha wrthyf!"" ("Jesus, have mercy on me").

After the execution of Richard Gwyn, his head and one of his quarters were spiked upon Denbigh Castle. The other three quarters were similarly displayed at Wrexham, Ruthin Castle, and Holt Castle.

Within seven months of Richard Gwyn's execution, Lewis Gronow confessed to having committed perjury in return for a bribe. The Elizabethan English account of the case alleges that, shortly afterwards, Sir George Bromley lost the use of his reason and, "became an idiot". Simon Thelwall died soon afterwards, as did most of the members of the jury. Furthermore, the Puritan cloth merchant David Edwards allegedly "died a fearful death" during Lent of 1585. Mr. Christopherson, the crier of the court, also lost the use of his reason and was left catatonic. The anonymous author of the account "sees in all these events the finger of Providence."

== Bard ==
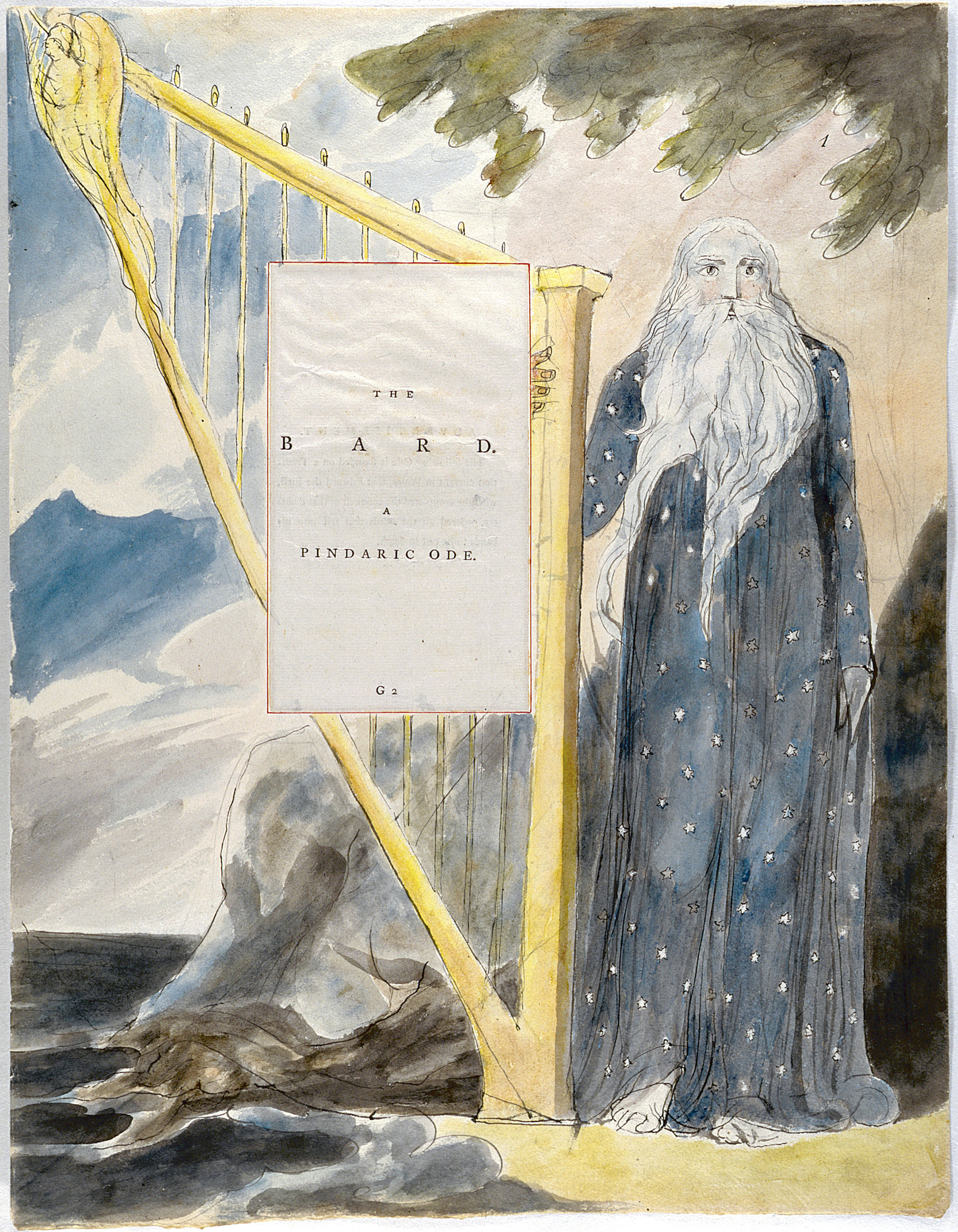
Title-page of Thomas Gray'sThe Bard illustrated by William Blake, c. 1798

When he began working as a village schoolmaster, Richard Gwyn was reportedly fascinated by the Welsh folklore and poetry of the Wrexham area.

At the time, Queen Elizabeth I of England had commanded that the bards of Wales were to be examined by the officials of the Crown and licensed to be allowed to compose Welsh poetry or compete in Eisteddfodau. Poets who were refused a licence, according to Hywel Teifi Edwards, were coercively, "put to some honest work." Richard Gwyn, however, chose to compose poetry anyway. According to an anonymous writer from the Elizabethan era, "As for his knowledge of the Welsh tongue, he was inferior to none in his country, whereto he hath left to posterity some precedent in writing, eternal monuments of his wit, zeal, virtue, and learning."

During the early 20th-century, five works of Welsh poetry in strict meter by St. Richard Gwyn, were identified by Celticist John Hobson Matthews of the Catholic Record Society in one of the Llanover Manuscripts. The manuscript containing the poems is dated 1670 and is in the handwriting of the famous Welsh poet Gwilym Puw, a recusant member of the Welsh aristocracy who fought as a Royalist officer during the English Civil War and later became an underground Roman Catholic priest. John Hobson Matthews found an additional sixth poem in the collections of the Cardiff Free Library (Welsh MS. 23, Ph. 2954 {vol. I, p. 255.}).

Catholic Record Society founder John Hungerford Pollen wrote that the Richard Gwyn poems discovered by John Hobson Matthews, "fully justify the biographer's praise. 'Wit, zeal, virtue, and learning' are all clearly there."

Prosecution witness Edward Erles had testified that Gwyn was composing anti-Protestant poetry in the Welsh language. This is confirmed by the six poems that have survived in manuscript form, which reveal further why the Queen and her Councillors viewed a Welsh village schoolmaster as such a serious danger to enforcing the Elizabethan religious settlement.

In Wales, whose people have always admired their poets above all others, Richard Gwyn, similarly to other recusants bards of the era such as Robert Gwin, Catrin ferch Gruffudd ap Hywel, William Davies, and Gruffydd Robert, was using both his education and his literary talents to spread the theology of what would later be dubbed the Counter-Reformation through the means of Welsh poetry.

In a poem which Hobson Mathews and Pollen dubbed "Carol I" ("The Church of God is One") and which begins Gwrando gyngor gwr oth wlad ("Hear the counsel of a man of thy nation"), Gwyn argued that, just as there was only one Garden of Eden and one Ark to save Noah from the Great Flood, there is also only One True Church, the government of which was give by Jesus Christ to St. Peter and to St. Peter's spiritual children. Gwyn then said that the Church is as clearly seen as the sun in the sky and is dowered beyond price, even though smoke is mounting from Satan's pit between the eyes of the blind man and the sky. Gwyn then denounced Martin Luther as a, glafer glec ("cunning flatterer"). Gwyn added that if two Protestants have ever agreed without arguing about points of new doctrine, then Richard Gwyn himself would willingly praise them and become the third member of their denomination. Gwyn continued by accusing Protestants of denying the Christian Bible, Gidai mean gelwydde ("with their mean lies"), as well as the Saints and Doctors of the Church. Gwyn urged his listeners to beware of Protestant ministers and to seek the Catholic Faith, lest, "when night shades fall", they will have to give an account upon the highest hill of why they did not. Gwyn ended the poem by describing himself as a man under the protection of Jesus and who implored God every day to return the Catholic Faith to Wales.

In "Carol II", which begins, Duw a ro yr awen i brudydd o Bryden ("May God send the Muse to a poet of Britain"), Gwyn argued in favour of both having devotion to the Blessed Virgin and of regularly reciting all fifteen decades of the Rosary. In what may have been a subtle dig at the exclusive use of John Calvin's Genevan Psalter in Reformed worship throughout Europe, Gwyn dubbed the rosary, Pllaswyr Fair ("The Psalter of Mary").

In "Carol III", which begins, Gwrandewch ddatcan, meddwl maith ("Hear a song, a great thought,"), Gwyn both summarized and versified Jesuit priest Robert Persons's 1580 samizdat work, A brief discovrs contayning certayne reasons why Catholiques refuse to goe to Church. All the reasons given by Persons for Catholics to avoid attending Anglican services were listed by Richard Gwyn, "but of course only in brief poetic way."

In "Carol IV", which begins Adda ag Efa ar Neidir fraeth ("Adam and Eve and the smooth-tongued serpent"), Gwyn denounced the theology of the Protestant Reformation and the greed, gluttony, and hedonism of those whom he said preached it. Gwyn alleged that tithe money given to Anglican Vicars went solely to support their luxurious lifestyle. Gwyn also urged his listeners to pay no attention to anyone who preached against devotion to the Blessed Virgin, the Saints, or against the Catholic doctrine of Transubstantiation. At the end of his poem, Gwyn argued that he preferred to have his own head cut off rather than believe in Protestant theology.

In "Carol V", which begins Angau su yn y Sessiwn Mawr ("The Grim Reaper is in the Great Session"), Gwyn began by briefly describing the famous aftermath to the 5 July 1577 trial of printer and bookseller Roland Jenks before the Oxford Assizes for illegally selling Catholic books. Within just a few hours of Jenks being convicted and sentenced to have both of his ears cut off, an epidemic took the lives of the judge, half the members of the Bar present, and large numbers of the bystanders. Taking these events as a springboard, Gwyn argued in favour of a life spent in penance and willing acceptance of martyrdom, so that death will not find each soul unprepared to meet its Maker. Gwyn accused Protestant royalty, nobles, and ministers of spiritual blindness and inability to lead anyone to salvation. He said that if coughing was good for an old crone, if a fish-hook was good for a fish, of if a hard frost was good at midsummer, than such people had a good conscience. Gwyn concluded by saying that, although he lived under imprisonment, he yet lived in hope.

An 11th-century Statute alleged to be by King Gruffydd ap Cynan of the House of Aberffraw in Gwynedd had been used as the basis for the 1523 Caerwys eisteddfod and all those that have since followed it. Among many other things, the Statute decreed that Welsh bards must never write satirical poetry.

Despite this fact, the sixth Richard Gwyn poem, which was found by John Hobson Matthews at the Cardiff Free Library, is titled Cowydd Marwnadd yn llawn cabledd ir prins o Orens ("Funeral Ode, full of reproach of the Prince of Orange"). The poet is a satirical eulogy and a work of praise poetry in Cywydd-form. It was composed at Wrexham Jail after Balthasar Gérard's 10 July 1584 assassination at Delft of William the Silent, the Calvinist Prince of Orange-Nassau and the English-backed leader of the Dutch Revolt against the rule of King Philip II of Spain.

According to John H. Pollen, Gwyn "was sometimes carried into the faults usual to men of his ardent character and that he was a good hater as well as a warm lover". Pollen further writes, "The paean over the assassination of the Prince of Orange", was, "not unnatural considering the circumstances". To Gwyn, "the hyperbolic praises", lavished on the slain Prince by the Elizabethan State, and, "the hypocrisy of persecuting the Catholics" of the British Isles, "because of a political assassination in Holland might, with reason, have exasperated him. Nevertheless, the poem is one which we must now regret, and indeed condemn, for it is plainly wanting both in forbearance and in good feeling."

All six of Gwyn's poems were literally translated into English from the Middle Welsh literary language by John Hobson Matthews and David Lloyd Thomas and bilingually published, side by side, by the Catholic Record Society in 1908.

In 1931, Welsh Bard T.H. Parry-Williams, who at the 1912 National Eisteddfod of Wales at Wrexham had achieved for the first time the almost unheard of feat of winning both the Bardic Chair and the Crown at the same Eisteddfod and who had since become Professor of Welsh at the University of Wales, Aberystwyth, published his own scholarly edition of the complete poems of Richard Gwyn, along with original source material about his life in Middle Welsh, Elizabethan English, and Renaissance Latin.

== Investigation, canonization, and feast day ==
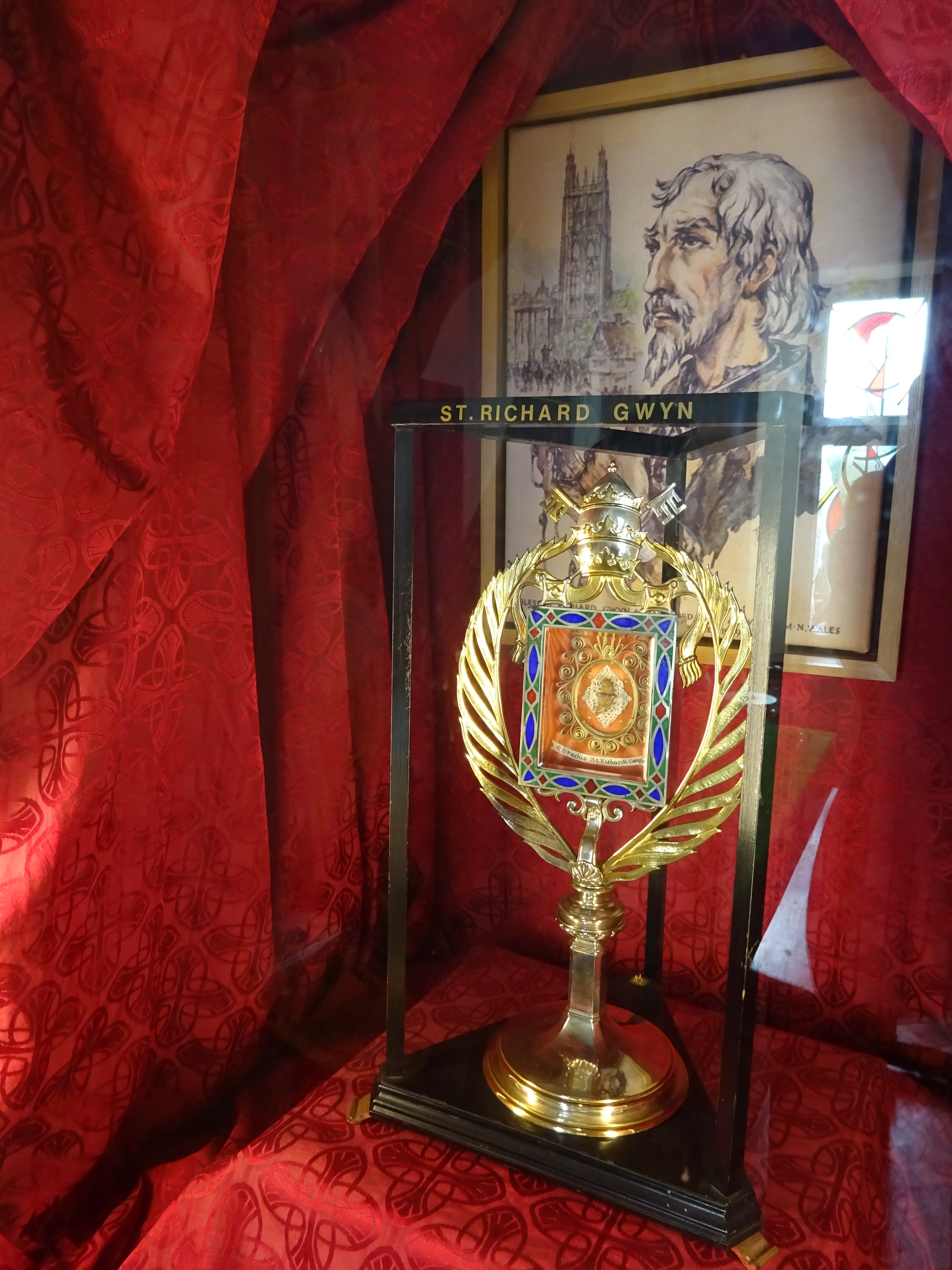
A first class relic of St. Richard Gwyn displayed for veneration at Wrexham Cathedral.

In 1588, a detailed account of Richard Gwyn's martyrdom written by John Bridgewater in Renaissance Latin was published at Trier, as part of the book Concertatio Ecclesiae Anglicanae.

Following Catholic Emancipation in 1829, an Elizabethan era samizdat manuscript was found at the Mission House of the Catholic Chapel, Holywell". The manuscript, which is titled, "A True Report of the Life and Martyrdom of Mr. Richard White, Schoolmaster, Who suffered on the 15th day of October, an. Dom. 1584", provides a detailed account of Richard Gwyn's life and martyrdom. The contents of the manuscript, which is held in the archives of St. Beuno's College in Tremeirchion, Denbighshire, Wales, were first published in The Rambler in 1860 by John Henry Newman of the Birmingham Oratory. When checked against other period sources, this Elizabethan English account has been found far more reliable than Bridgewater's account in Latin, including for the dates of Gwyn's trial and even for that of his execution.

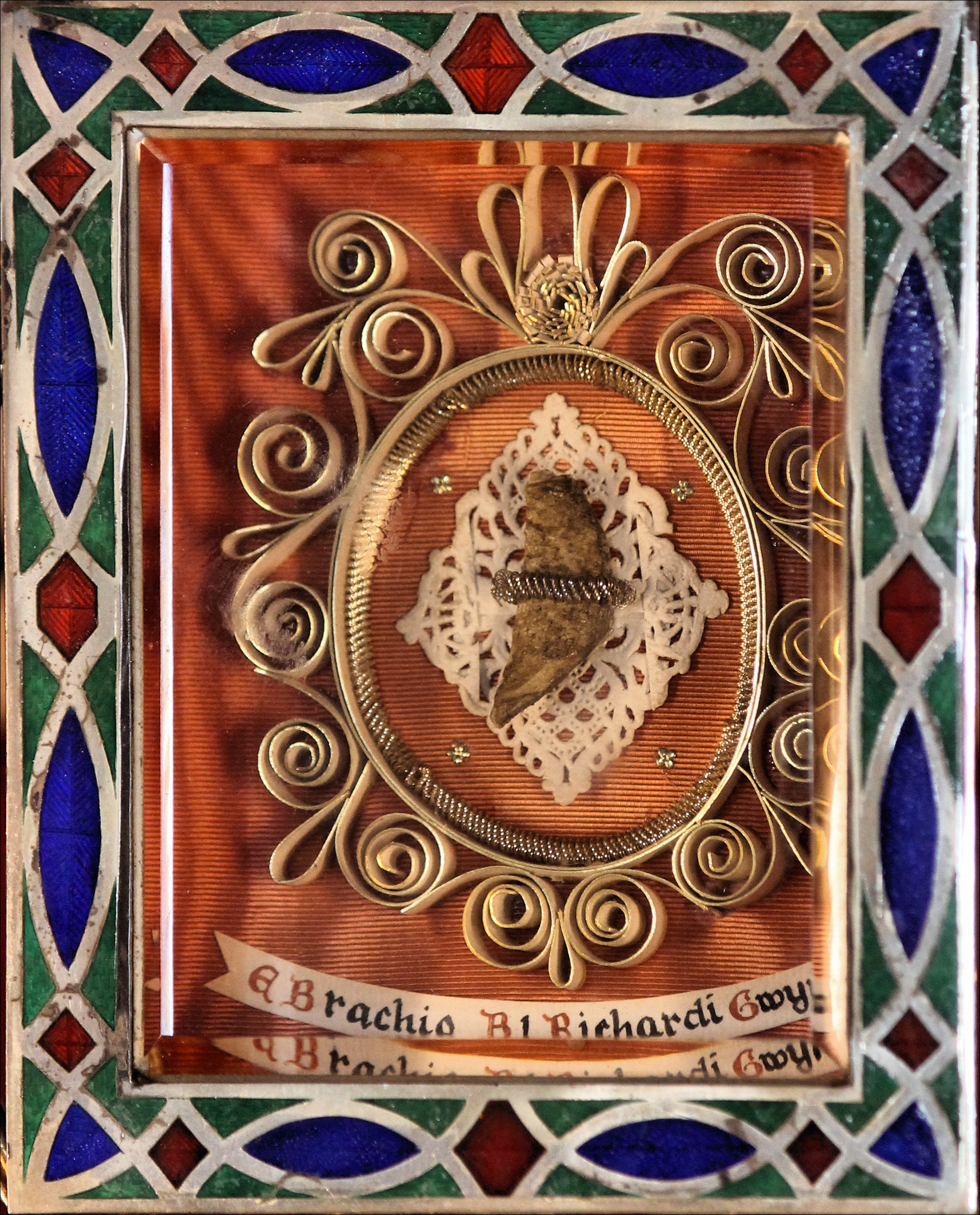
A close up of the same relic.

Writing in 1971, historian D. Aneurin Thomas credited the writing of this second account, as well as the similar biography of Welsh Catholic Martyr William Davies (d.1593), to Welsh secular priest and future Jesuit John Bennett (c.1550 - 1625). Bennett had not only been an underground priest in active ministry in North Wales at the same time, but had known Richard Gwyn as a fellow "prisoner for religion" in the custody of the Council of Wales and the Marches and torture victim at Bewdley and Bridgnorth Castle.

Cardinal William Godfrey of the Roman Catholic Diocese of Westminster, submitted 24 potentially miraculous cures to the Sacred Congregation for the Causes of Saints. Out of the candidate cases for recognition as answered prayers, the alleged cure of a young mother from a malignant tumor was selected as the clearest case. In light of the fact that Saints Thomas More and John Fisher, who belonged to the same group of Martyrs, had been canonized in 1935 with a dispensation from miracles, Pope Paul VI, after discussions with the Sacred Congregation, decided that it was permissible under the Code of Canon Law to proceed with multiple Canonizations on the basis of one miracle.

In response, Pope Paul VI granted permission for the whole group of 40 names to be recognized as saints on the basis of this one miracle cure. The canonization ceremony for St. Richard Gwyn took place as part of that for the Forty Martyrs of England and Wales at Rome on 25 October 1970.

Like the other 39 martyrs Canonized with him, St. Richard Gwyn was originally commemorated by the Catholic Church in England with a feast day on 25 October, which is also the feast of Saints Crispin and Crispinian, but he is now venerated together with all the 284 canonized and beatified martyrs of the English Reformation on 4 May.

The Catholic Church in Wales celebrates the feast day of the Six Welsh Martyrs: priests Philip Evans and John Lloyd, John Jones, David Lewis, John Roberts, the layman Richard Gwyn, and their companions, every year on 25 October. The Roman Martyrology places St Richard's feast on 17 October.

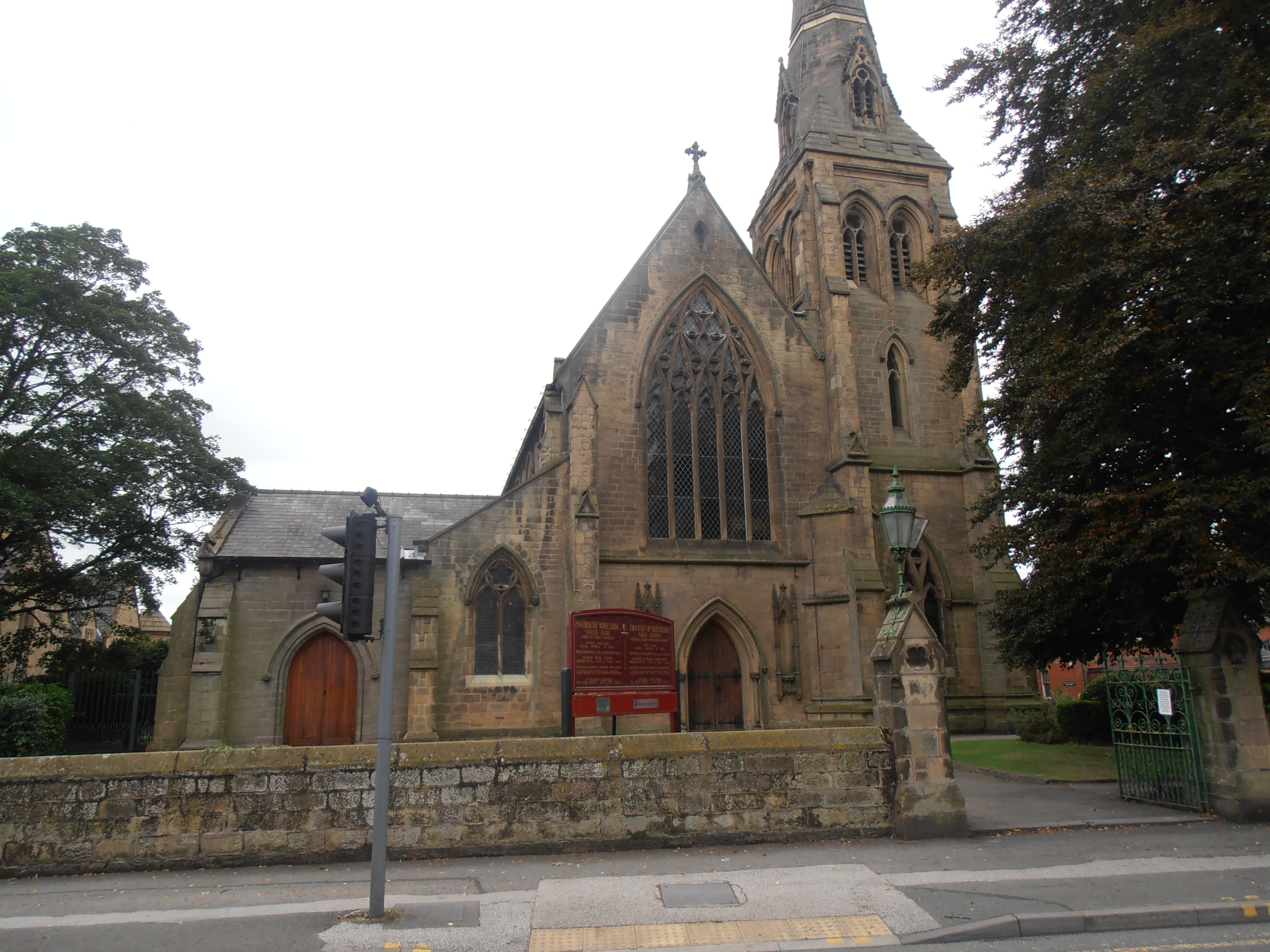
Roman Catholic Cathedral of Our Lady of Sorrows in Wrexham.

Relics of St. Richard Gwyn are available to be venerated at the Gothic revival Church of Our Lady of Sorrows, which began being construction in 1857 and is now the Cathedral Church of the Roman Catholic Diocese of Wrexham. Every year, St. Richard Gwyn is honoured by the Catholics of Wrexham by a religious procession to the site of his execution in the former Beast Market of the city. Along with St. Margaret Clitherow, Gwyn is also the co-patron of the Latin Mass Society of England and Wales, which since 2015 has sponsored an annual pilgrimage to Wrexham and Tridentine Missa Cantata on the closest Sunday to the anniversary of Gwyn's martyrdom.

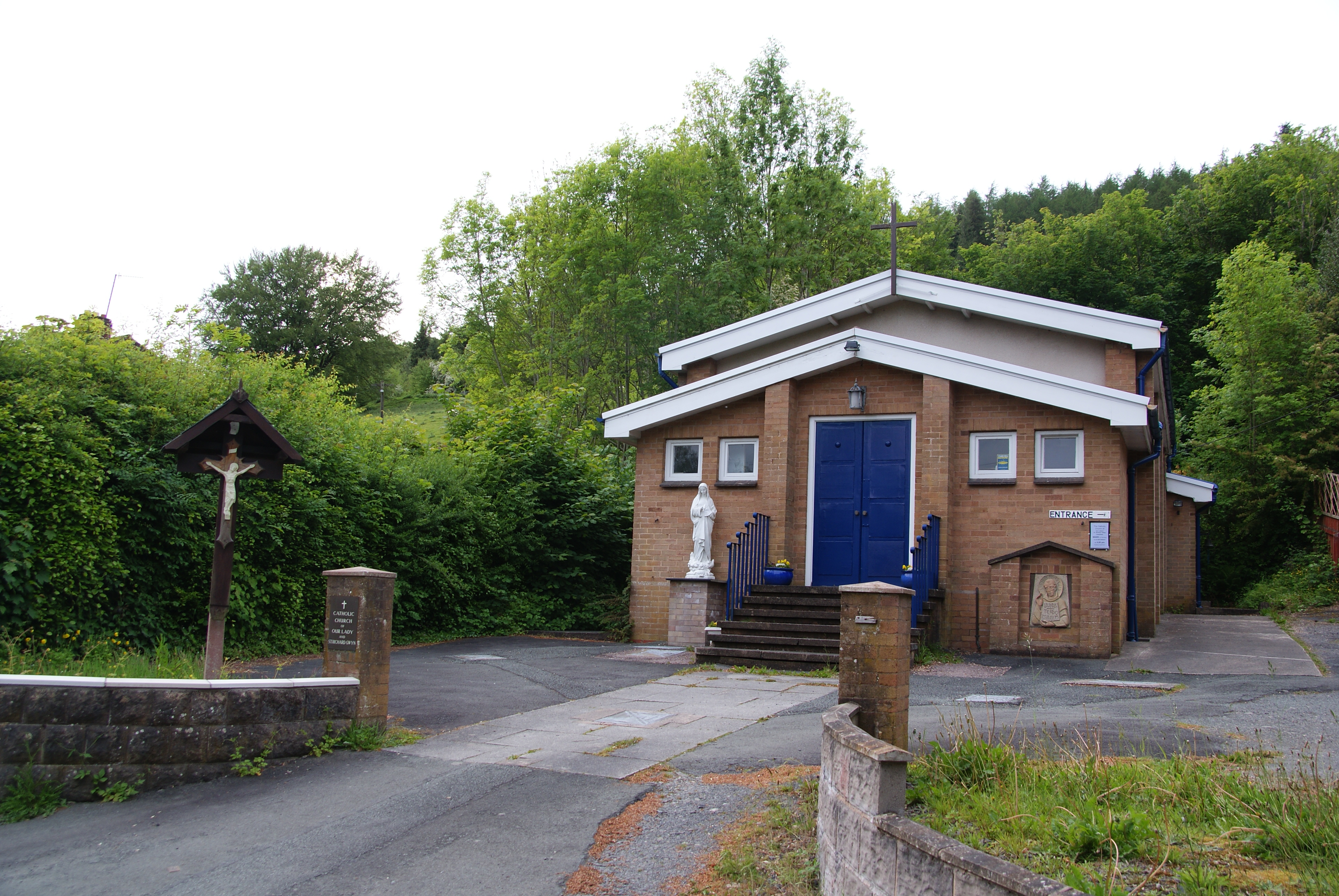
Roman Catholic Church of Our Lady and St. Richard Gwyn, Llanidloes.

Other relics of St. Richard Gwyn may be venerated at the Roman Catholic Church of Our Lady and Saint Richard Gwyn in his native town of Llanidloes. The church building began construction during the 1950s next to the Franciscan friary on Penygreen Road. The first Mass was celebrated there on 18 October 1959.

== Commemoration ==
In 1954, Blessed Richard Gwyn Roman Catholic High School was founded in Flint, Flintshire. Its name was altered slightly following Gwyn's Canonization in 1970. St Richard Gwyn Catholic High School in the Vale of Glamorgan, which was originally named St Cadoc's, was renamed in honour of St Richard Gwyn in 1987.

== Quote ==
- From Carol IV:

Nid wrth fwyta cig yn ffêst
A llenwi'r gêst Wenere
A throi meddwl gida'r gwynt,
Yr aethon gynt yn Saintie.

"Not by eating flesh speadily
And filling the paunch on Fridays
And turning one's opinion with the wind
Were folk made Saints of old."

== See also ==
- Dissident
- Jean de La Ceppède
- Joost van den Vondel
- Metaphysical poets
- Parrhesia
- Robert Southwell
- Samizdat
- Speaking truth to power
