= Gwinn Mountain =

Mountain in West Virginia, United States

Coordinates: 37.8276°N 80.8336°W

Gwinn Mountain is a summit in West Virginia, in the United States. With an elevation of 2,949 feet (899 m), Gwinn Mountain is the 383rd highest summit in the state of West Virginia.

The summit has the name of Andrew Gwinn, an early settler.
