= Ty Gwyn =

Tŷ Gwyn (Welsh for "White" or "Blessed House") may refer to:

- Tŷ Gwyn, a former monastic community near Whitesands Bay in Pembrokeshire with ties to SS. Patrick and David
- Tŷ Gwyn Tower at Barmouth in Gwynedd
- Tŷ Gwyn at Crossways in Monmouthshire, a producer of cider
- Tŷ Gwyn, the former name for Clydach in Swansea
- Tŷ Gwyn, an estate in Penylan, Cardiff
- Tygwyn railway station at Glan-y-wern in Gwynedd on the Cambrian Line
- Tŷ Gwyn on the Taf (Tŷ Gwyn ar Daf), the supposed site of the legendary Welsh parliament that produced the Laws of Hywel Dda
- Whitland (Hendy-gwyn, "Old White House") in Carmarthenshire, the present settlement there
