= David Gwynne =

Welsh cricketer

Personal information
- Full name: David Graham Pugsley Gwynne
- Born: 8 December 1904; Swansea, Glamorgan, Wales
- Died: 11 December 1934 (aged 30); Swansea, Glamorgan, Wales
- Batting: Right-handed

Domestic team information
- Years: Team
- 1922–1923: Glamorgan

Career statistics
Competition	FC
Matches	3
Runs scored	20
Batting average	3.33
100s/50s	–/–
Top score	12
Catches/stumpings	1/–
- Source: Cricinfo, 29 June 2010

David Graham Pugsley Gwynne (8 December 1904 – 11 December 1934) was a Welsh cricketer. Gwynne was a right-handed batsman. He was born in Swansea, Glamorgan.

Gwynne made his first-class debut for Glamorgan in 1922 against Sussex. He played 2 further first-class matches for the county, against Hampshire in 1922 and Lancashire in 1923. In his 3 first-class matches he scored just 20 runs at a batting average of 3.33 and a high score of 12, while in the field he took a single catch.

Gwynne died at the town of his birth on 11 December 1934.
