= Gwynne Nettler =

Canadian sociologist, psychologist, and stuntman

- Born: July 7, 1913
- Died: October 5, 2007 (aged 93–94)
- Education: University of California, Los Angeles; Claremont College; Stanford University
- Awards: 1982 E. H. Sutherland Award from the American Society of Criminology; Elected a Fellow of the Royal Society of Canada in 1982
- Scientific career
- Fields: Sociology; Criminology
- Thesis: The Relationship Between Attitude and Information Concerning the Japanese in America (1946)
- Doctoral students: John L. Hagan

Gwynne Nettler FRSC (1913–October 5, 2007, also often spelled Gwynn Nettler) was a Canadian sociologist, psychologist, and movie stuntman who taught at the University of Alberta from 1963 to 1978.

== Biography ==
When Nettler was young, he acted as a stuntman in multiple Tarzan films, as well as the original Mutiny on the Bounty film. He was also a talented swimmer, and was on a water polo team. He was educated at the University of California, Los Angeles (A.B.), Claremont College (M.A.), and Stanford University (Ph.D., 1946). Early in his career, he worked as the senior clinical psychologist at the Nevada State Department of Health, and as an industrial psychologist in Mexico City, Mexico. He began teaching at the University of California, Santa Barbara in 1947, and he subsequently became a part-time cat-burglar, so much so that a 1951 Time article described him as a "wonderful burglar specializing in rugs, lamps and other bric-a-brac". He joined the faculty of the University of Alberta in 1963, where he was promoted to full professor in 1966; he remained on the faculty there until he retired in 1978.

== Work ==
In 1959, Nettler published a study which found that people who believed more in free will tended to recommend harsher punishments for criminals. Conversely, the same study also found that people who believed more in determinism tended to support less severe punishments, and instead generally recommended therapy and reform efforts. In 1961, he gained international attention when he published a paper questioning whether or not deviants should be described as "sick". His 1970 book Explanations has since become commonplace in upper-level criminology and philosophy classes throughout North America.

== Honors and awards ==
In 1982, Nettler received the E. H. Sutherland Award from the American Society of Criminology, and was named a fellow of the Royal Society of Canada.
