= Nell Gwyn (disambiguation) =

Nell Gwyn (1650–1687) was an actress and long-time mistress of King Charles II of England.

Nell Gwyn may also refer to:

- Nell Gwyn (operetta), an 1884 work by Robert Planquette
- Nell Gwyn (1926 film), starring Dorothy Gish
- Nell Gwyn (1934 film), starring Anna Neagle
- Nell Gwynn (play), a 2015 play by Jessica Swale
- Nell Gwyn Stakes, a Group 3 flat horse race in Great Britain
- Nell Gwynne Tavern, a public house in Covent Garden, London
- Gargoyle Club, once the Nell Gwynne Revue, a strip club in Soho, London
