= St Richard Gwyn Catholic High School, Barry =

Secondary school in Wales

Coordinates: 51.423°N 3.240°W

St Richard Gwyn Catholic High School is a Roman Catholic comprehensive secondary school in Vale of Glamorgan, Wales.

It is named after the Welsh martyr St. Richard Gwyn. It is co-educational, and educates boys and girls from 11 to 16 years. Pupils wishing to study at Sixth Form usually attend St David's Catholic College .

Its feeder schools include St Helen's Primary School, Barry, and St Joseph's Primary School, Penarth.

The school was originally named St Cadoc's until the name was changed in 1987. The school also moved from Coldbrook Road, Dinas Powys, to Argae Lane, Vale of Glamorgan.

As of 2005, enrolment was 548, a school record, and further growth was projected. Demand for places had exceeded supply in every year since 2000.

The governing body has around 21 governors, some from the Archdiocese of Cardiff-Menevia.
