= William Gwin =

William Gwin may refer to:

- William M. Gwin (1805–1885), American medical doctor and politician
- William Gwin (naval officer) (1832–1863), officer in the United States Navy during the American Civil War
