= Gwynne Geyer =

American operatic soprano

Gwynne Geyer (born August 13, 1956) is an American operatic soprano and voice teacher.

== Early life and education ==
Born in Pennsylvania on August 13, 1956, Gwynne Geyer grew up in Gilbertsville, Pennsylvania. She attended the Boyertown Area School District and graduated from Boyertown Area High School in 1974. In her senior year she portrayed Maria in a school production of The Sound of Music. She trained as a soprano at the Jacobs School of Music at Indiana University where she studied voice with Eileen Farrell and earned a Master of Music degree.

== Career ==
Geyer made her professional opera debut in 1979 while a graduate student at Indiana University; singing the role of Xenia in a concert version of Boris Godunov with the St. Louis Symphony Orchestra. She had previously made her professional concert debut with that orchestra in 1977 performing as the soprano soloist in Ludwig van Beethoven's Choral Fantasy.

Geyer has sung leading roles at major opera houses all over the Western world, including La Scala, the Metropolitan Opera, and the Vienna State Opera. She played the role of Nedda in Pagliacci for the New York City Opera in 1992.

She opened the 2004–2005 season as Madame Lidoine in Poulenc's Les Dialogues des Carmelites at the New York City Opera, followed by Elsa in Lohengrin (opera) at the Teatro Real in Madrid, and Symphony No. 8 (Mahler) with the National Orchestra of Mexico in the Palacio de Bellas Artes. Miss Geyer made her La Scala debut under the baton of Riccardo Muti in 2004 as Madame Lidoine in Les Dialogues des Carmelites, which followed Ellen Orford in Peter Grimes in Barcelona, and her role debut in the title role of Ariadne auf Naxos for the Spoleto Festival USA of which the Wall Street Journal reported: "Gwynne Geyer has elegance to spare to play Ariadne ... Spoleto was fortunate in its Ariadne, a role that can be just as tedious as the commedia characters insist. Gwynne Geyer has a big, gleaming soprano with effortless high notes, and she shaped her long laments with musical elegance."

In recent seasons Miss Geyer has been heard in a variety of roles on the great stages of the world, among them, Musetta in La Bohème for the Metropolitan Opera, Jenufa at La Fenice in Venice, Rusalka with the Seattle Opera, the title role of Katya Kabanova and Musetta at the Paris Opéra Bastille, Madame Lidoine at the Netherlands Opera in Amsterdam, Freia in Das Rheingold in Madrid, Elsa in Lohengrin at the Liceu in Barcelona, and the title role of Jenufa at the Teatro San Carlo in Naples which was reported in London's monthly Opera (British magazine): "Gwynne Geyer as Jenufa herself added yet another superb characterization to her gallery ... and singing with that distinctive vocal timbre of hers that conveys (especially at the top) a kind of ecstatically painful sincerity."

Career highlights for Miss Geyer have included performances at the Metropolitan Opera as Rosalinde in Die Fledermaus, the title role of Rusalka, Nedda in I pagliacci, Marguerite in Faust, Eva in Die Meistersinger, and Marenka in The Bartered Bride. She sang the title role in Richard Jones' production of Jenufa at the Netherlands Opera, the title role in the Santa Fe Opera premiere of Countess Mariza, Mila Valkova in Janáček's Osud with the VARA Radio in Amsterdam, and a critically acclaimed portrayal of Galina Vishnevskaja in Marcel Landowski's Galina with Opéra National de Lyon. Gwynne Geyer made her professional operatic debut at the New York City Opera debut as Nedda in Pagliacci. Miss Geyer has appeared in concert and recording (BMG Classics) of Mahler's Symphony No. 8 with the Netherlands Radio Philharmonic (VARA) under the baton of Edo de Waart and the Sydney Symphony, and in Britten's War Requiem under the baton of John Nelson.

Miss Geyer has sung leading roles at the Metropolitan Opera, Vienna State Opera, Opéra National de Paris - Bastille, Arena de Verona, San Francisco Opera, Bayerische Staatsoper - Munich, New Israeli Opera, Seattle Opera, Grand Théâtre du Geneve, Canadian Opera Company, Gran Teatre del Liceu - Barcelona, New York City Opera, Opéra National de Lyon, The Santa Fe Opera, and the Opera Theatre of St. Louis. Miss Geyer has appeared in concert with the Philadelphia Orchestra, Los Angeles Philharmonic, Montreal Symphony, Cleveland Orchestra, and the Minnesota Orchestra.

She is currently Artist in Residence & Teaching Professor of Music at the Franklin & Marshall College.
