= Robert Gwin =

Welsh Roman Catholic priest and author

Robert Gwin (fl. 1591) was a Welsh Roman Catholic priest and author.

== Life ==
Gwin was from the diocese of Bangor in Wales, and received his education at Corpus Christi College, Oxford, where he was admitted to the degree of B.A. on 9 July 1568. In 1573 he went to the English College at Douay and studied divinity. He was ordained priest in 1575, and sent back to Wales on the mission on 16 January 1575-6, having just before that date taken the degree of B.D. in the university of Douay. He lived chiefly in Wales, and was much esteemed for his talent in preaching. A document in the archives of the English College at Rome says that he ‘tam scriptis quam laboribus maximum in afflictissimam patriam auxilium contulit’.

By an instrument dated 24 May 1578 Pope Gregory XIII granted him a licence to bless portable altars, etc., because at that time there were in England only two Catholic bishops, both of whom were in prison, namely, the Irish Archbishop of Armagh Richard Creagh and Thomas Watson, the Bishop of Lincoln. Gwin, who appears to still have been alive in 1591, wrote several religious works in the Welsh language, according to Antonio Possevino, who gives no titles. He also translated from Elizabethan English into Middle Welsh A Christian Directory or Exercise guiding men to eternal Salvation, commonly called The Resolution, written by Robert Persons, the Jesuit. Gwyn may have written Y Drych Cristianogawl, the first book to be printed in Wales.
