= John Gwynne (captain) =

John Gwynne (fl. 1660), was a mercenary soldier.

Gwynne, a Welshman, was the grandson of Edward Gwynne, barrister-at-law. He was a retainer in the household of Charles I, and was employed in training the royal family in military exercises. He rose to be a captain in the King's Regiment of Guards. During the Civil War he seems to have distinguished himself by his personal courage and activity. After the king's execution he followed the fortunes of Charles II. Gwynne was with Montrose in his last unhappy attempt in 1650, and joined the forces of General John Middleton in 1654. When that enterprise also failed he served James, Duke of York, and was with him at the fight before Dunkirk in 1658, and in Flanders. Upon the Restoration, Gwynne seems to have been passed over and left to embarrassment, if not to want. He accordingly drew up a statement of the battles, skirmishes, and adventures in which he had exhibited his loyalty. The manuscript is a very neat one, and is preceded by several letters to persons of consequence whose interest the author was desirous of securing. Whether he proved successful or otherwise in his application is unknown. Many years later, the manuscript was presented to Sir Walter Scott by the Rev. John Grahame of Lifford, near Strabane, Ireland, into whose hands it had fallen by accident. Scott published it as Military Memoirs of the Great Civil War. Being the Military Memoirs of John Gwynne, &c., 4to, Edinburgh, 1822. (Reprinted by the British Library in 2011. ISBN 1-2416-9131-2)
