= Goronwy ap Tudur Hen =

Welsh aristocrat and soldier (died 1331)

- Died: 1331
- Buried: Bangor, Gwynedd
- Noble family: Penmynydd family
- Spouse: Gwerfyl ferch Madog of Hendwr
- Issue: Hywel ap Goronwy; Tudur ap Goronwy; Gruffudd ap Goronwy
- Father: Tudur Hen
- Mother: Anghared ferch Ithel Fychan

Goronwy ap Tudur Hen (died 1331) was a Welsh aristocrat and Lord of Penmynydd. He was a member of the Penmynydd family and a direct ancestor of Owen Tudor and thereby the Royal House of Tudor. He was a soldier for the English crown, who fought in the First War of Scottish Independence, including in the English invasion which led to the Battle of Bannockburn. He remained loyal to King Edward II of England until the king's death, and was both a yeoman and forester of Snowdon. After his death in 1331, his body was interred in Llanfaes Friary, near Bangor, Gwynedd.

== Ancestry and family ==
Goronwy ap Tudur Hen was one of three sons of Welsh noble Tudur Hen (English: Tudur the Elder) and Anghared ferch Ithel Fychan, alongside Madog ap Tudur Hen and Hywel ap Tudur Hen.

Tudor Hen had first been in service to Llywelyn ap Gruffudd (also known as Llywelyn the Last), the King of Gwynedd, but retained his titles under the conquest of Wales by King Edward I of England. But during the rebellion of Madog ap Llywelyn, Tudur acted as his steward. After the rebellion failed, Tudur pledged his loyalty to Edward.

Utilising the more advantageous property laws of England, Tudur saw to it that his lands were passed seamlessly upon his death in 1311 into the hands of Goronwy.

== Service to the English crown ==
Goronwy ap Tudur Hen was Lord of Penmynydd and a soldier in the service of the English crown. He joined King Edward II of England for his invasion of Scotland in 1314 as part of the First War of Scottish Independence, which included service at the Battle of Bannockburn in June of that year. In 1316, a rebellion took place in Glamorgan under the leadership of Llywelyn Bren, at the same time Edward was campaigning in Scotland.

Despite this, there was little concern that it would spread to North Wales, with the royal officials instead concerned with the threat of invasion from Ireland. Some 1,500 troops were summoned from the area to support the King, and among those leading those troops were Iorweth ap Gruffudd, Gruffudd Llwyd and his cousin Goronwy ap Tudur Hen. After these troops, under the command of Gruffudd Llwyd, moved to Chester, they were dismissed on 4 August 1316 to return to North Wales in order to protect the area from the Irish threat.

Goronwy and his troops were again summoned into the King's service to retake Berwick in 1319, after Scottish forces had taken it a year earlier. The majority of the forces from Wales came from the southern Marcher Lords, but Goronwy, Gruffudd Llwyd and Hywel ap Gruffudd ap Geruath led those from the northern part of the country. Around the same time, as a yeoman of the king, Goronwy was made forester of Snowdon. He remained loyal to Edward II, but following the king's death, he resumed service to Edward III.

Goronwy married Gwerfyl ferch Madog, daughter of Madog ap Iorwerth, 3rd Baron of Hendwr. Goronwy and Gwerfyl had three sons, Tudur, Hywel, and Gruffudd.

Goronwy was interred after his death in the west wall of the Franciscan Llanfaes Friary near Bangor, Gwynedd on 11 December 1331. His father had overseen the reconstruction efforts of the friary, and in 1311 was the first of the family to be placed there following his death.

== Legacy ==
Goronwy's eldest son Hywel ap Goronwy joined the priesthood, and became a canon of Bangor Cathedral. In 1357, Hywel became the Archdeacon of Anglesey. Gruffudd drowned in 1344.

=== Lineage ===
The Penmynydd family and their relatives
Disteiniaid of the Kingdom of Gwynedd Members of the Penmynydd family Members of the House of Tudor

Tangwystl ferch Llywarch	Ednyfed Fychan d. 1246	Gwenllian ferch Rhys d. 1236	Einion ap Gwalchmai fl. 1202–1223
Llywelyn ab Ednyfed	Tudur ab Ednyfed d. c. 1281	Gruffudd ab Ednyfed Fychan d. c. 1256	Goronwy ab Ednyfed Fychan d. 1268	Angharad ferch Ednyfed	Einion Fychan ab Einion
Rhys ap Llywelyn	Heilin ap Tudur fl. 1246–1282	Rhys Hen ap Gruffudd d. 1284	Tudur Hen ap Goronwy d. 1311	Dafydd ab Einion Fychan d. c. 1282
Gwilym ap Rhys	Gruffudd ap Heilin d. c. 1340	Gruffudd Llwyd ap Rhys d. 1335	Goronwy ap Tudur Hen d. 1331	Tomos ap Llewelyn d. 1343
Ardudful ferch Gwilym	Gwilym ap Gruffudd d. c. 1370	Hywel ap Goronwy d. c. 1367	Tudur ap Goronwy d. c. 1367	Marged ferch Tomos	Elen ferch Tomos	Gruffudd Fychan II
Dafydd Llwyd ap Gwilym Gam d. c. 1350–1380	Gruffudd ap Gwilym d. 1405	Goronwy Fychan ap Tudur d. 1382	Rhys ap Tudur executed 1412	Ednyfed ap Tudur d. 1382	Gwilym ap Tudur d. 1413	Maredudd ap Tudur d. 1406	Owain Glyndŵr d. c. 1416
Gwilym ap Gruffudd d. 1431	Morfudd ferch Goronwy	Owen Tudor c. 1400–1461
Tudur Fychan	Edmund Tudor c. 1430–1456; 1st Earl of Richmond	Jasper Tudor, Duke of Bedford; 1431–1495	David Owen
Owain ap Tudur d. 1504/1505	Henry VII; 1457–1509; King of England
William ab Owain d. 1523?	John ab Owain	Richard ab Owain d. 1527 (?)	Arthur; 1486–1502; Prince of Wales	Henry VIII; 1491–1547; King of England
Richard Owen d. 1558	William Bold	Edward VI; 1537–1553; King of England	Mary I 1516–1558; Queen of England	Elizabeth I 1533–1603; Queen of England
Richard Owen Theodor (III)	David Owen Theodor d. 1624
Richard Owen Theodor (IV) fl. 1645
Richard Owen Theodor (V) fl. 1665
Richard Owen Theodor (VI) fl. 1669
