= Tudur Fychan ap Goronwy =

Welsh nobleman, soldier and landowner

- Died: 1367
- Buried: Llanfaes Friary
- Noble family: Penmynydd family
- Spouse: Marged ferch Tomos
- Issue: Goronwy Fychan ap Tudur; Rhys ap Tudur; Gwilym ap Tudur; Maredudd ap Tudur
- Father: Goronwy ap Tudur Hen
- Mother: Gwerfyl ferch Madog of Hendwr

Tudur Fychan ap Goronwy (c. 1310 - c. 1367) was a Welsh landowner, soldier and administrator of the Tudors of Penmynydd family from the island of Anglesey.

== Origins ==
Born about 1310, he was one of the two sons of Goronwy ap Tudur Hen and his wife Gwerfyl ferch Madog. His father had fought for King Edward I of England and had stayed loyal to King Edward II of England. On his father's death in 1331, he inherited the family lands which had passed down from his grandfather Tudur Hen and lived in the village of Trecastell.

His brother and ally, Hywel ap Goronwy (died about 1366), joined the priesthood, becoming a canon of Bangor Cathedral, and eventually Archdeacon of Anglesey.

== Career ==
He was a royal officer for the island of Anglesey and served in the English army of King Edward III of England during the campaigns in France in 1337.

In 1345 he and his brother Hywel were involved in a prominent murder case, probably the result of local unrest. Henry Shalford, newly appointed as the Prince of Wales' representative in North Wales, was attacked and killed near Hywel's house in Bangor by a band of men led by Tudur. One report suggested that Shalford knew too much about malpractice among leading Welshmen. The result was panic among the English inhabitants of the area and suspicion of the Welsh community. Both brothers were arrested and placed in custody, with Hywel held at Launceston in Cornwall and Tudur in Chester, but both were eventually released without charge or penalty. This led to complaints by English residents that "no Welsh man dare indict them" because of their local influence. Gruffydd ap Maredudd ap Dafydd suggested that the brothers were as strong as oak trees and protected all those under their branches. In 1352, both were in peaceful possession of their ancestral lands in Anglesey.

Tudur was buried in the south wall of the chancel at the Franciscan friary of Llanfaes near Bangor, Gwynedd. The bodies of his ancestors were nearby, in the south wall of the chapel. The bard Iolo Goch composed an elegy to him.

== Family ==
The Welsh genealogies show Tudur Fychan ap Goronwy marrying twice, to Mallt ferch Madog, daughter of Madog ap Iorwerth, and to Marged ferch Tomos, daughter of Tomos ap Llewelyn and aunt of rebel Owain Glyndŵr, and having six sons:

Goronwy Fychan ap Tudur;
Rhys ap Tudur (by Mallt);
Ednyfed ap Tudur;
Gwilym ap Tudur;
Rhys ap Tudur (by Marged);
Maredudd ap Tudur.

All rose to positions of power locally on Anglesey and in the adjoining areas of North Wales. Both Rhys and Gwilym accompanied King Richard II of England on his expedition to Ireland in 1398 and, after he was deposed, Rhys, Gwilym and Maredudd were supporters of the Welsh uprising of their cousin Owain Glyndŵr against King Henry IV of England.

Maredudd's son Owain, known in English as Owen Tudor, became the grandfather of King Henry VII of England.

== Lineage ==
The Penmynydd family and their relatives
Disteiniaid of the Kingdom of Gwynedd Members of the Penmynydd family Members of the House of Tudor

Tangwystl ferch Llywarch	Ednyfed Fychan d. 1246	Gwenllian ferch Rhys d. 1236	Einion ap Gwalchmai fl. 1202–1223
Llywelyn ab Ednyfed	Tudur ab Ednyfed d. c. 1281	Gruffudd ab Ednyfed Fychan d. c. 1256	Goronwy ab Ednyfed Fychan d. 1268	Angharad ferch Ednyfed	Einion Fychan ab Einion
Rhys ap Llywelyn	Heilin ap Tudur fl. 1246–1282	Rhys Hen ap Gruffudd d. 1284	Tudur Hen ap Goronwy d. 1311	Dafydd ab Einion Fychan d. c. 1282
Gwilym ap Rhys	Gruffudd ap Heilin d. c. 1340	Gruffudd Llwyd ap Rhys d. 1335	Goronwy ap Tudur Hen d. 1331	Tomos ap Llewelyn d. 1343
Ardudful ferch Gwilym	Gwilym ap Gruffudd d. c. 1370	Hywel ap Goronwy d. c. 1367	Tudur ap Goronwy d. c. 1367	Marged ferch Tomos	Elen ferch Tomos	Gruffudd Fychan II
Dafydd Llwyd ap Gwilym Gam d. c. 1350–1380	Gruffudd ap Gwilym d. 1405	Goronwy Fychan ap Tudur d. 1382	Rhys ap Tudur executed 1412	Ednyfed ap Tudur d. 1382	Gwilym ap Tudur d. 1413	Maredudd ap Tudur d. 1406	Owain Glyndŵr d. c. 1416
Gwilym ap Gruffudd d. 1431	Morfudd ferch Goronwy	Owen Tudor c. 1400–1461
Tudur Fychan	Edmund Tudor c. 1430–1456; 1st Earl of Richmond	Jasper Tudor, Duke of Bedford; 1431–1495	David Owen
Owain ap Tudur d. 1504/1505	Henry VII; 1457–1509; King of England
William ab Owain d. 1523?	John ab Owain	Richard ab Owain d. 1527 (?)	Arthur; 1486–1502; Prince of Wales	Henry VIII; 1491–1547; King of England
Richard Owen d. 1558	William Bold	Edward VI; 1537–1553; King of England	Mary I 1516–1558; Queen of England	Elizabeth I 1533–1603; Queen of England
Richard Owen Theodor (III)	David Owen Theodor d. 1624
Richard Owen Theodor (IV) fl. 1645
Richard Owen Theodor (V) fl. 1665
Richard Owen Theodor (VI) fl. 1669

== Sources ==
- Griffiths, Ralph Alan; Thomas, Roger S. (1985). The Making of the Tudor Dynasty. New York: St. Martin's Press. ISBN 978-0-31250-745-9.
- Nicholas, Thomas (1872). Annals and Antiquities of the Counties and County Families of Wales. Vol. 1. London: Genealogical Publishing.
