= Rhys ap Tudur =

Welsh rebel

- Born: c. late 14th century
- Died: 1412; Chester, Cheshire
- Cause of death: Executed
- Occupations: Rhaglaw for Dindaethwy; Sheriff of Anglesey

Rhys ap Tudur (died 1412) was a Welsh nobleman and a member of the Tudor family of Penmynydd. He held positions of power on behalf of King Richard II of England, including two periods as the Sheriff of Anglesey in the 1370s and 1380s. Rhys accompanied the king on a military expedition to Ireland in 1398, but in 1400 began to support the revolt of his cousin Owain Glyndŵr against King Henry IV of England. In 1401, he and his brother Gwilym ap Tudur took Conwy Castle after infiltrating it, and liaised with Henry Percy prior to his own rebellion in 1403. After being outlawed by the king in 1406, Rhys was captured and executed at Chester in 1412, although later oral tradition claims he returned to Anglesey to die there.

== Ancestry and early life ==
Rhys was one of five sons of Tudur ap Goronwy and Marged ferch Tomos; alongside Ednyfed ap Tudur, Maredudd ap Tudur, Goronwy Fychan ap Tudur and Gwilym ap Tudur. Tudur had served with the forces of King Edward III of England during the campaigns in France in 1337, assuming the rank of knight in the process. Afterwards, he became a royal officer for the island of Anglesey and ensured that all of his sons found similar roles. The family were descended from Ednyfed Fychan, and his son Goronwy ab Ednyfed, the founder of the Tudor family of Penmynydd.

== Service to the crown ==
Rhys and his brother Goronwy were rhaglaws (bailiffs) for the commote of Dindaethwy across three decades; from the 1370s through to the 1390s. He was made Sheriff of Anglesey twice, first between 1374–75 and again in 1381–84. This was a post more typically held by an Englishman at the time. In 1386, Rhys was one of the leaders of a contingent of soldiers raised in Caernarfonshire to protect against a potential invasion by the French. King Richard II of England paid Rhys £10 a year to retain his service should the crown require it, and accompanied him on a military expedition to Ireland in 1398.

However, that same year Rhys was summoned before the king's justiciar of North Wales to explain why he had managed to become indebted to the sum of £60 in his role of rhaglaw at Dindaethwy. Rhys held lands in Anglesey and Caernarfonshire which he inherited from his father, and these would have provided a steady income.

== Revolt ==
In September 1399, King Richard II was overthrown by Henry IV. When Rhys' cousin Owain Glyndŵr began a rebellion the following year, he and his brothers publicly backed him. While Owain's rebellion in North East Wales faltered, Rhys and his family rose up against the king on Anglesey. Henry IV personally took an army to put down the revolt, and harried the island, burning the Franciscan Llanfaes Friary near Bangor, Gwynedd, where the Tudur family were buried. Rhys led troops to ambush them from an advantageous spot on Rhos Fawr. When he engaged Henry's troops, the English fled to the safety of Beaumaris Castle.

When Henry issued a general pardon for those of North Wales in March 1401, he purposely excluded Rhys, his brother Gwilym and Owain Glyndŵr. As a result, Rhys and Gwilym hatched an audacious plan. On Good Friday, 1 April 1401, the brothers and 44 men infiltrated Conway Castle. They pretended to be carpenters, and entered the castle while the guard were in church, capturing it. Negotiations began for the return of the castle on 13 April, with the king represented by Henry "Hotspur" Percy. After seeking a compromise, which would have resulted in pardons being given to the Welshmen, the king overrode Percy's decision on 20 April. An agreement was finally reached on 24 June after several failed attempts when Gwilym began writing to the king directly.

Percy subsequently liaised with Rhys in preparation for his own rebellion against the king on 1403, which started and ended with the Battle of Shrewsbury where Percy was killed by the king's forces. All three Tudur brothers were outlawed by the king in 1406. The constable of Welshpool Council arrested several rebel leaders, including Rhys and transported him to Chester. Documents from the era show that Rhys was executed there in 1412.

== Legacy ==
After the execution of Rhys, his brother Gwilym was given a full pardon a year later. Both their lands had been forfeited when they joined with Owain's rebellion and passed to Gwilym ap Gruffydd, who had married Morfudd, the daughter of Goronwy ap Tudur. Rhys' death was later lamented in a poem by Gruffydd Gryg.

=== Lineage ===
The Penmynydd family and their relatives
Disteiniaid of the Kingdom of Gwynedd Members of the Penmynydd family Members of the House of Tudor

Tangwystl ferch Llywarch	Ednyfed Fychan d. 1246	Gwenllian ferch Rhys d. 1236	Einion ap Gwalchmai fl. 1202–1223
Llywelyn ab Ednyfed	Tudur ab Ednyfed d. c. 1281	Gruffudd ab Ednyfed Fychan d. c. 1256	Goronwy ab Ednyfed Fychan d. 1268	Angharad ferch Ednyfed	Einion Fychan ab Einion
Rhys ap Llywelyn	Heilin ap Tudur fl. 1246–1282	Rhys Hen ap Gruffudd d. 1284	Tudur Hen ap Goronwy d. 1311	Dafydd ab Einion Fychan d. c. 1282
Gwilym ap Rhys	Gruffudd ap Heilin d. c. 1340	Gruffudd Llwyd ap Rhys d. 1335	Goronwy ap Tudur Hen d. 1331	Tomos ap Llewelyn d. 1343
Ardudful ferch Gwilym	Gwilym ap Gruffudd d. c. 1370	Hywel ap Goronwy d. c. 1367	Tudur ap Goronwy d. c. 1367	Marged ferch Tomos	Elen ferch Tomos	Gruffudd Fychan II
Dafydd Llwyd ap Gwilym Gam d. c. 1350–1380	Gruffudd ap Gwilym d. 1405	Goronwy Fychan ap Tudur d. 1382	Rhys ap Tudur executed 1412	Ednyfed ap Tudur d. 1382	Gwilym ap Tudur d. 1413	Maredudd ap Tudur d. 1406	Owain Glyndŵr d. c. 1416
Gwilym ap Gruffudd d. 1431	Morfudd ferch Goronwy	Owen Tudor c. 1400–1461
Tudur Fychan	Edmund Tudor c. 1430–1456; 1st Earl of Richmond	Jasper Tudor, Duke of Bedford; 1431–1495	David Owen
Owain ap Tudur d. 1504/1505	Henry VII; 1457–1509; King of England
William ab Owain d. 1523?	John ab Owain	Richard ab Owain d. 1527 (?)	Arthur; 1486–1502; Prince of Wales	Henry VIII; 1491–1547; King of England
Richard Owen d. 1558	William Bold	Edward VI; 1537–1553; King of England	Mary I 1516–1558; Queen of England	Elizabeth I 1533–1603; Queen of England
Richard Owen Theodor (III)	David Owen Theodor d. 1624
Richard Owen Theodor (IV) fl. 1645
Richard Owen Theodor (V) fl. 1665
Richard Owen Theodor (VI) fl. 1669
