= Maredudd ap Tudur =

Welsh nobleman and soldier

- Born: second half of 13th century
- Died: c. 1406
- Spouse: Margaret ferch Dafydd
- Children: Owen Tudor
- Parent(s): Tudur ap Goronwy; Marged ferch Tomos
- Relatives: Gwilym ap Tudur (brother); Rhys ap Tudur (brother); Edmund Tudor (grandson); Jasper Tudor (grandson); Henry VII (great-grandson)

Maredudd ap Tudur (died c. 1406) was a Welsh soldier and nobleman from the Tudor family of Penmynydd. He was the youngest of six sons of Tudur ap Goronwy and was the father of Owen Tudor. Maredudd supported his cousin the Welsh patriot Owain Glyndŵr in 1400, alongside his brothers Rhys ap Tudur and Gwilym ap Tudur.

He was the great-grandfather of Henry VII of England, founder of the Tudor dynasty.

== Ancestry and early life ==
Maredudd was one of five sons of Tudur ap Goronwy and Marged ferch Tomos (a descendant of Llywelyn Fawr); alongside Ednyfed ap Tudor, Rhys ap Tudur, Goronwy ap Tudor and Gwilym ap Tudur. Tudur had served with the forces of King Edward III of England during the campaigns in France in 1337, assuming the rank of a knight in the process. Afterwards, he became a royal officer for the island of Anglesey and ensured that all of his sons found similar roles. The family were descended from Ednyfed Fychan, and his son Goronwy ab Ednyfed, the founder of the Tudor family of Penmynydd.

At some point between 1387 and 1395, Maredudd was made rhaglaw (bailiff) of the commote at Malltraeth. His brothers Rhys and Goronwy held similar roles in the commote of Dindaethwy. Maredudd was named escheator of Anglesey between 1388 and 1391, a role normally reserved by the crown for Englishmen.

== Revolt ==
When Owain Glyndŵr led a revolt against the crown, the surviving Tudur brothers (Goronwy and Ednyfed both drowned in 1382), sided with him openly; Glyndŵr was their cousin on his mother's side of the family. But unlike Rhys and Gwilym, Maredudd was included in a general pardon in 1401 given to those who on Anglesey who supported Owain. Despite this, Maredudd again led a group of rebels in 1405, and was outlawed a year later by the king.

Maredudd's lands were confiscated by the crown, but unlike those of his brothers they were not passed to Gwilym ap Gruffydd. The rebellion ultimately failed; Rhys was executed in 1412, Gwilym ap Tudur was given a pardon in 1413, but Maredudd disappears from the historical record after 1405 and his final fate is unclear.

== Legacy ==
Maredudd's son Owain initially used the name Owain ap Maredudd ap Tudur, but Anglicised it to become Owen Tudor. Owen married the widow of King Henry V of England, Catherine of Valois, in secret and had had three sons, Owen, Edmund and Jasper. Their half brother, King Henry VI of England, took an active interest in them and had Edmund married to Margaret Beaufort to ensure their children could inherit the throne of England. During the subsequent Wars of the Roses, Edmund's son Henry Tudor became King Henry VII of England, the founder of the House of Tudor.

=== Lineage ===
The Penmynydd family and their relatives
Disteiniaid of the Kingdom of Gwynedd Members of the Penmynydd family Members of the House of Tudor

Tangwystl ferch Llywarch	Ednyfed Fychan d. 1246	Gwenllian ferch Rhys d. 1236	Einion ap Gwalchmai fl. 1202–1223
Llywelyn ab Ednyfed	Tudur ab Ednyfed d. c. 1281	Gruffudd ab Ednyfed Fychan d. c. 1256	Goronwy ab Ednyfed Fychan d. 1268	Angharad ferch Ednyfed	Einion Fychan ab Einion
Rhys ap Llywelyn	Heilin ap Tudur fl. 1246–1282	Rhys Hen ap Gruffudd d. 1284	Tudur Hen ap Goronwy d. 1311	Dafydd ab Einion Fychan d. c. 1282
Gwilym ap Rhys	Gruffudd ap Heilin d. c. 1340	Gruffudd Llwyd ap Rhys d. 1335	Goronwy ap Tudur Hen d. 1331	Tomos ap Llewelyn d. 1343
Ardudful ferch Gwilym	Gwilym ap Gruffudd d. c. 1370	Hywel ap Goronwy d. c. 1367	Tudur ap Goronwy d. c. 1367	Marged ferch Tomos	Elen ferch Tomos	Gruffudd Fychan II
Dafydd Llwyd ap Gwilym Gam d. c. 1350–1380	Gruffudd ap Gwilym d. 1405	Goronwy Fychan ap Tudur d. 1382	Rhys ap Tudur executed 1412	Ednyfed ap Tudur d. 1382	Gwilym ap Tudur d. 1413	Maredudd ap Tudur d. 1406	Owain Glyndŵr d. c. 1416
Gwilym ap Gruffudd d. 1431	Morfudd ferch Goronwy	Owen Tudor c. 1400–1461
Tudur Fychan	Edmund Tudor c. 1430–1456; 1st Earl of Richmond	Jasper Tudor, Duke of Bedford; 1431–1495	David Owen
Owain ap Tudur d. 1504/1505	Henry VII; 1457–1509; King of England
William ab Owain d. 1523?	John ab Owain	Richard ab Owain d. 1527 (?)	Arthur; 1486–1502; Prince of Wales	Henry VIII; 1491–1547; King of England
Richard Owen d. 1558	William Bold	Edward VI; 1537–1553; King of England	Mary I 1516–1558; Queen of England	Elizabeth I 1533–1603; Queen of England
Richard Owen Theodor (III)	David Owen Theodor d. 1624
Richard Owen Theodor (IV) fl. 1645
Richard Owen Theodor (V) fl. 1665
Richard Owen Theodor (VI) fl. 1669
