= Tegwared y Bais Wen =

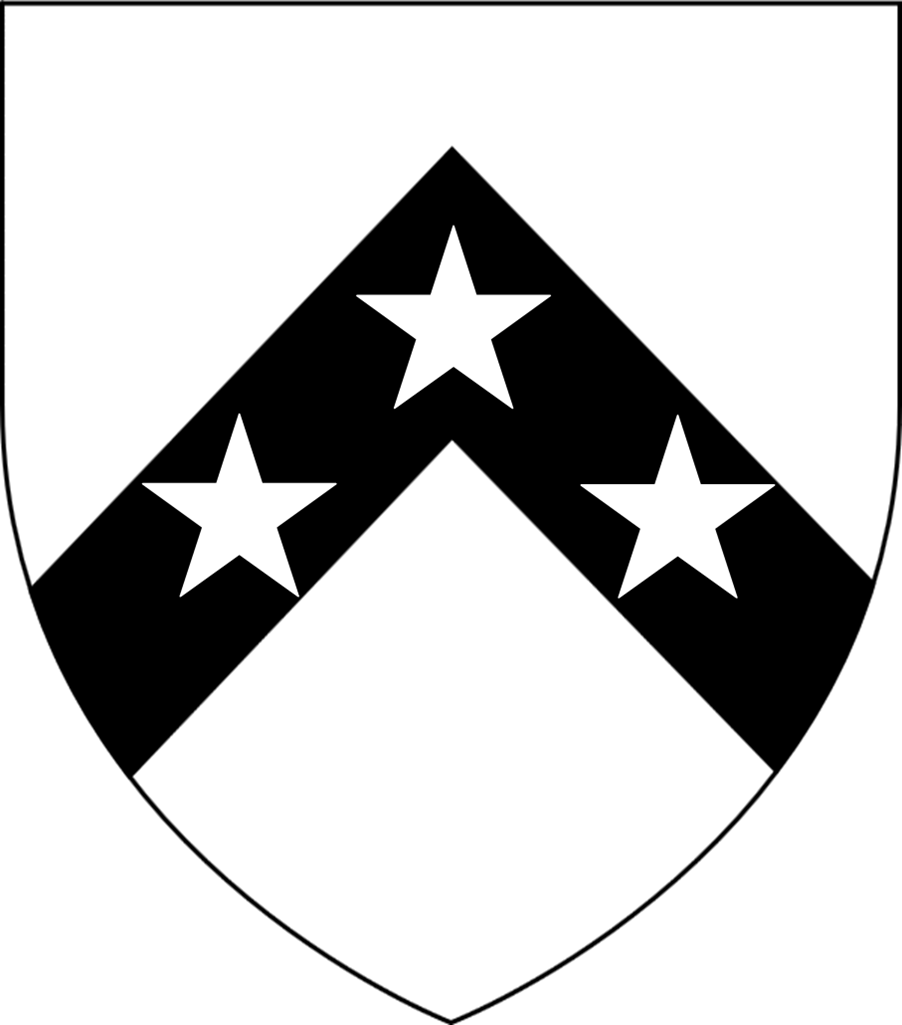
Shield of Tegwared y Baiswen

Tegwared y Bais Wen ap Llywelyn (English: Tegwared with the White Mantle/Escutcheon, son of Llewelyn; born c. 1210), Lord of Trefdraeth was a natural son of Llywelyn the Great, Prince of Aberffraw, by a woman named in some sources as Crysten. He was born circa 1210, although if he was a battle chief in Llywelyn Fawr’s golden era, this would place his birth perhaps a decade or more earlier. 'The white mantle' refers to his coat of arms (as shown to the right).

Tegwared served as a general in his father's army and held the Lordship of Trefdraeth, Anglesey, where his posterity lived for the next 600 years.

It is recorded that he was raised by Ednyfed Vychan, his father's Seneschal. This system of kin group raising of children (known as maeth) was common practice amongst the Welsh uchelwyr (high born) of the Middle Ages. It is recorded amongst farm families until the 1700s in parts of Eryri. Tegwared later married his daughter, Gwenlian ferch Ednyfed Vychan. They had the following children:

- Howel ap Tegwared
- Angharad ap Tegwared
- Arddun ap Tegwared
- Tegwared Vychan ap Tegwared (born circa 1250)
