= Ednyfed Fychan =

Welsh noble and statesman (died 1246)

Ednyfed Fychan ap Cynfrig
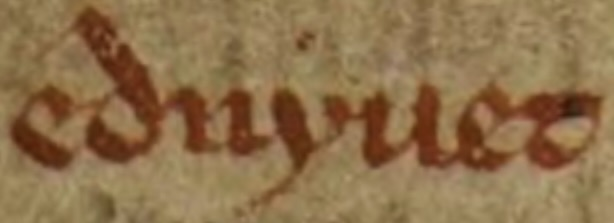
- Ednyfed's name (ednẏuet) in the rubrication of his son's elegy, from NLW MS 6680B f. 30^{r}

Distain of Gwynedd
- In office c. 1217–1246
- Monarchs: Llywelyn ab Iorwerth; Dafydd ap Llywelyn
- Preceded by: Gwyn ab Ednywain
- Succeeded by: After the Treaty of Woodstock: Goronwy ab Ednyfed Fychan (for Owain Goch); Gruffudd ab Ednyfed Fychan (for Llywelyn ap Gruffudd)

Personal details
- Died: 1 October 1246
- Spouses: Tangwystl ferch Llywarch (died) Gwenllian ferch Rhys (died 1236)
- Children: with Tangwystl: Tudur (died c. 1281) and others: Llywelyn; Hywel, bishop of St Asaph; Rhys; Cynwrig; Iorwerth y Gwahanglwyfus; with Gwenllian: Goronwy (died 1268); Gruffudd (died c. 1256) and others: Gwladus, married; Tegwared ap Cynwrig; Gwenllian, married; Tegwared ap Llywelyn; of uncertain mothers: Angharad, married; Einion Fychan ab Einion; Gwenllian, married; Aron ap Rhys; Gwrwared ap Gwilym; Tudur Gwilltyn
- Parents: Cynfrig ab Iorwerth (father); Angharad ferch Hwfa (mother)
- Relatives: Ancestor of the Penmynydd family and the House of Tudor

Ednyfed Fychan ap Cynfrig (Welsh pronunciation: [ɛdˈnəvɛd ˈvəχan ap ˈkənvrig], died 1 October 1246) was a Welsh nobleman who served as distain or seneschal (roughly equivalent to a modern prime minister) of the Kingdom of Gwynedd in North Wales. Ednyfed held this position under the princes of Gwynedd for almost thirty years, and his tenure as distain (plural: disteiniaid) appears to have coincided with the transformation of the office from one of domestic service to that of being the prince of Gwynedd's closest adviser and agent.

From 1217 onwards, Ednyfed is recorded witnessing Llywelyn ab Iorwerth's charters, carrying out diplomatic missions, administering justice, and perhaps even leading military action on the prince's behalf. After Llywelyn's death in 1240, Ednyfed served in the same position under Llywelyn's son and successor Dafydd, and is repeatedly recorded leading diplomatic missions on Dafydd's behalf to his rebellious brother Gruffudd and King Henry III of England. Ednyfed died some eight months after Dafydd, probably on 1 October 1246.

Ednyfed established a ministerial dynasty which served the princes of Gwynedd for over thirty years after his death until the Edwardian conquest. His preeminence allowed him to marry Gwenllian, a daughter of the Lord Rhys, prince of Deheubarth. Ednyfed's sons succeeded him as disteiniaid and his descendants held a monopoly on the position until the final campaign of Llywelyn ap Gruffudd in December 1282, the turning point of Edward I's conquest of Wales. Even after the Conquest, Ednyfed's heirs and the heirs of his brothers, known as the Wyrion Eden 'descendants of Ednyfed', enjoyed special privileges in their tenure, first granted by the Llywelyns. They held their lands free from all renders other than military service, which allowed them to become very wealthy and influential. Ednyfed was granted land across Wales and many of his descendants served in the new English administration. Ednyfed's grandson Tudur Hen ap Goronwy established the branch of the family associated with Penmynydd in Anglesey, which produced leading ecclesiastical and administrative figures of the fourteenth century in Wales. Owen Tudor, grandfather of Henry VII, was a member of this family, thus making Ednyfed the first distinguished ancestor of the House of Tudor, the house that held the throne of England from 1485 to 1603.

== Early life ==
Little is known of Ednyfed's early life beyond his being born into an established family related to the Second Dynasty of Gwynedd. Ednyfed was the eldest son of Cynfrig ab Iorwerth, whose grandfather Gwgon established the settlement of Betws Gwyrion Gwgon in modern Denbighshire. Ednyfed's byname fychan (a soft mutation of the Welsh word bychan, 'small' or 'junior') usually would suggest his father or grandfather was also named Ednyfed, but as this is not the case, it may instead refer to his size. The core territory associated with Ednyfed's family was that around Abergele in Rhos, a cantref of the Perfeddwlad. Ednyfed's mother was Angharad ferch Hwfa from Cyffylliog in Dyffryn Clwyd, whose mother in turn was Gwenllian, daughter of Owain Gwynedd, king of Gwynedd. Ednyfed's family was very influential in Rhos and later generations would claim that Marchudd ap Cynan of Is Dulas was the founder of the family. Sixteenth-century poet and genealogist Gruffudd Hiraethog alleged Marchudd was Pro[te]ctor Deffender and Arglwydd Protector to the ninth-century king of Gwynedd Rhodri Mawr, while the seventeenth-century antiquary Robert Vaughan calls him 'Lord of Abergeleu'. This lineage was ultimately traced to one 'Cadrod Calchfynydd', son of Cynwyd Cynwydion, supposed ancestor of the royal dynasty of Strathclyde in the formerly Brittonic-speaking area of northern Britain known as the Old North .

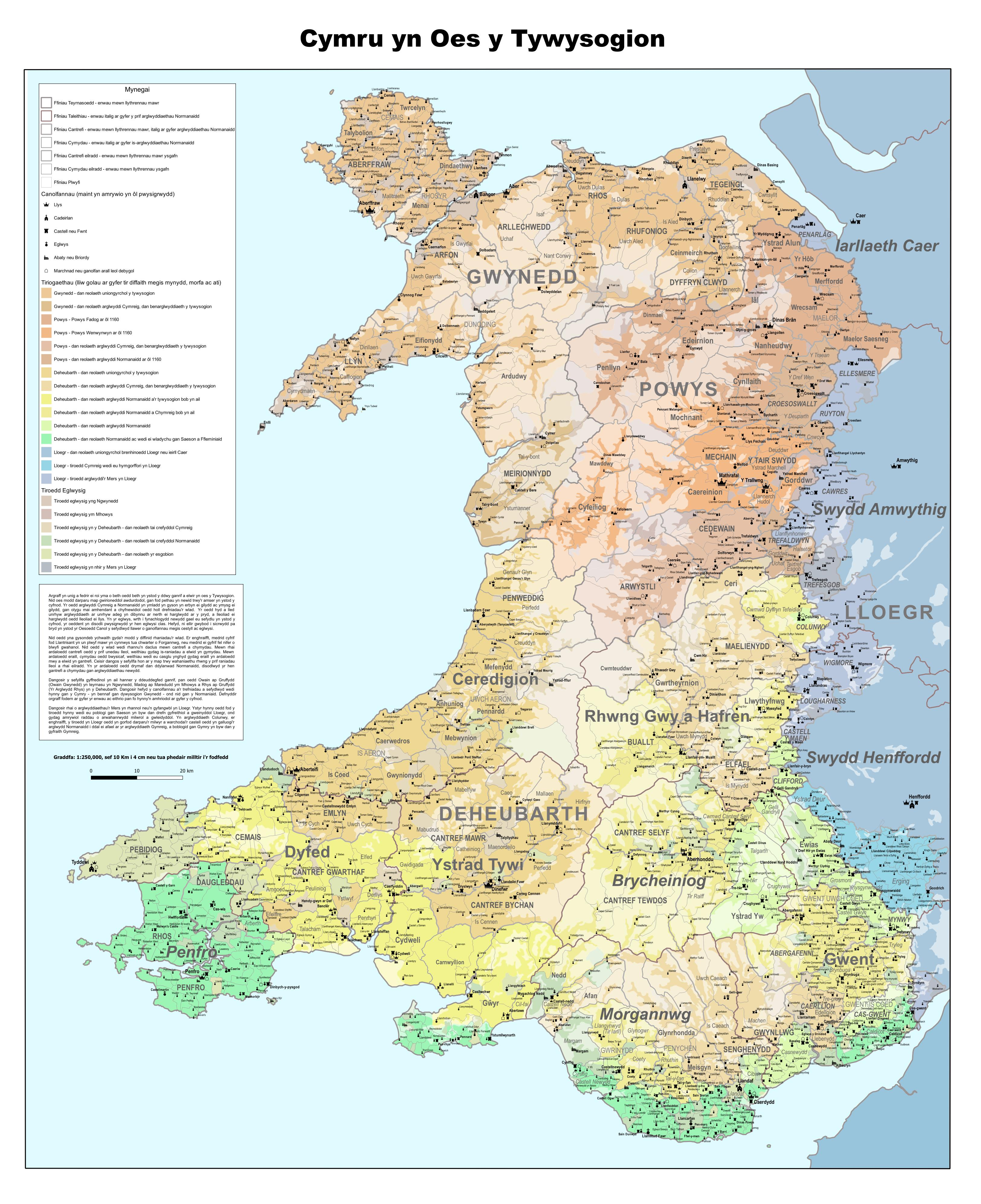
Commotes and cantrefi of Wales in the period of Ednyfed's lifetime

King Henry VII of England, a lineal descendant of Ednyfed, appointed a commission in about 1490 to examine the pedigree of his grandfather Owen Tudor. The original report of this commission does not survive, but its text was printed in William Wynne's 1697 version of David Powel's 1584 Historie of Cambria. This commission recorded that Ednyfed fought against King John during the reign of Llywelyn ab Iorwerth and slew three English lords one morning in battle. According to the story, after Ednyfed showed their heads to Llywelyn, the prince allowed him to bear three bloody heads as his arms in token of his victory, which were also borne by his descendants, including the Penmynydd family.

Welsh historian John Edward Lloyd situated Ednyfed's feat within the context of the invasion of Gwynedd in 1210 led by Ranulf de Blondeville, Earl of Chester, and Peter des Roches, bishop of Winchester. The earl sought to take Perfeddwlad for himself and built castles in Holywell and Degannwy, and in the next year King John himself invaded and ravaged Gwynedd, heading an army with most of the other Welsh princes under him. While this campaign was disastrous for Llywelyn, who only regained his position by 1213, this may have been when Ednyfed first caught the prince's eye and began his long career of service to the princes of Gwynedd. The folk memory of Ednyfed's actions may reflect real events, but the grant of arms "almost certainly [occurred] significantly after his death in 1246", according to historian David Stephenson.

== Tenure as distain ==
=== Service under Llywelyn ab Iorwerth ===
Ednyfed Fychan is first recorded in Llywelyn ab Iorwerth's service acting as a seneschal or distain in summer 1217, when he was recorded as heading a witness list in a grant by Llywelyn of Llandimôr in Gower to Morgan Gam of Afan. (Note: David Stephenson argued this grant should be dated to 1215, prefacing the division of Deheubarth between the descendants of the lord Rhys at the council of Aberdyfi in 1216. However, Huw Pryce notes this grant would not have been possible in 1215, since Llywelyn only seized Gower from Reginald de Braose in 1217.) (Note: While this is the first record of Ednyfed acting in the role of a distain, Ednyfed is not explicitly called a seneschallus (distain) in contemporary documentary sources until 1225.) Ednyfed was preceded in this role by Gwyn ab Ednywain, who was probably first distain to Gruffudd ap Cynan, ruler of Meirionnydd and Gwynedd Uwch Conwy before being overthrown by Llywelyn in 1199. Gwyn's last recorded action in the role was his heading a list of witnesses confirming a donation of land by Llywelyn to the Cistercian abbey of Strata Marcella on 25 November 1209. According to David Stephenson, Ednyfed was "almost certainly" Gwyn's immediate successor, though it is impossible to date the beginning of Ednyfed's tenure in the office. (Note: For a handlist of records of Ednyfed's actions as distain, see Stephenson 2014, pp. 207–9.)

In March 1218, Llywelyn ab Iorwerth signed three agreements with Henry III of England, known collectively as the Treaty of Worcester. These confirmed Llywelyn's occupation of Powys and the royal castles of Cardigan and Carmarthen which he had won in the campaigns of 1215–16. However, these agreements also asserted the king's overlordship over Llywelyn and other Welsh lords, who were required to do homage to him. In the third of these agreements, confirming Llywelyn's right to hold the king's court in the royal castles, Ednyfed appears as a negotiator and leads the list of the prince's officials and leading men of the principality who are bound to the terms of the treaty. According to the treaty, Llywelyn's officials and supporters would "be absolved from homage and fealty to [Llywelyn]" should the prince betray the terms of the agreement, and could "[not]... return to Llywelyn's homage and fealty without first making satisfaction to the king or his heirs concerning the aforesaid breaches".

Similarly, Ednyfed appears to have been a chief negotiator in the 1222 talks which led to the marriage of Llywelyn's daughter Helen to John of Scotland, heir apparent to the earldom of Chester. The pair were married "for the purpose of effecting a lasting peace" between Llywelyn and Ranulf de Blondeville, John's uncle, against whom Ednyfed had fought some twelve years earlier yet became the prince's closest ally in England. Perhaps in recognition of his services in upholding the treaty of Worcester, Henry III granted Ednyfed letters of protection in 1229 for some of his holdings: Llansadwrn in Ystrad Tywi, and Cellan and Llanrhystud in Ceredigion.

In 1223, in accordance with the terms of the Treaty of Worcester, Ednyfed acted with the king's authority and as Llywelyn's chief representative, determining the limits of lands won by Maelgwn ap Rhys, Rhys Gryg, and Owain ap Gruffudd of Deheubarth in the campaign of 1215–16. The findings of an inquisition held on 28 October 1278 recorded Ednyfed, "justice of the prince", had arbitrated a land dispute between two lords of Mechain some decades before, which suggests he also held legal authority in Llywelyn's principality. This is further supported by an occasion in 1234 when Ednyfed arbitrated a dispute in the lordship of Madog ap Gruffudd Maelor between the monks of Valle Crucis and the freemen of Llangollen over a dispute about the ownership of a fishing weir on the Dee.

Political divisions of Wales in 1234 Llywelyn's lands after 1218 Gains of the Pact of Myddle, 1234 The March

Over Easter 1230, Llywelyn found his wife Joan, legitimised daughter of King John, in compromising circumstances with the marcher lord of Brecon, William de Braose, whom Llywelyn consequently had hanged on 2 May that year. Joan was kept imprisoned by Llywelyn for her infidelity until 1231. The execution of de Braose did not cause an incident with the English, but hostilities between prince and king broke out in April 1231, when Llywelyn attacked de Braose's former castle at Radnor, which was then being managed by the powerful justiciar Hubert de Burgh. The royal counter-campaign of 1231 headed by de Burgh stalled, and de Burgh was removed from his position in 1232. Ednyfed Fychan led a diplomatic mission to Henry III which resulted in a truce between Llywelyn and the king for a year from 30 November 1231. Ednyfed made two further visits in May and November 1232 together with Llywelyn's wife Joan to further negotiate with the king's representatives.

However, in 1233, Llywelyn threw in his lot with Richard Marshal's baronial rebellion against Henry III. While Llywelyn was making gains in this short conflict, he sent Ednyfed and Dafydd ap Llywelyn, his son by Joan, to negotiate terms with the king at Worcester in June 1233. When Richard was murdered by his allies in Ireland in early 1234, Llywelyn sealed a lasting peace with the English Crown in June that year with the Pact of Myddle. Llywelyn appears to have personally negotiated the terms of this treaty enacting a peace between Henry and the prince from 25 July 1234, extending for two years, but which was renewed yearly until Llywelyn's death. No castles could be built or repaired in the whole of the March, and Llywelyn was confirmed in his possession of Buellt and Cardigan. Henry requested Ednyfed be present when extending the truce in 1237, and he appears at the list of the prince's ministers who swore to uphold the truce upon its renewal in 1238. According to Matthew Paris, Llywelyn suffered a massive paralytic stroke in late spring 1237. This led Dafydd to assume effective rulership of Gwynedd.

Because there was peace between Llywelyn and the king after 1234, Ednyfed decided to go on pilgrimage to the Holy Land, and received safe conduct through England from the king in June 1235. Whilst waiting to depart from London that same month, the king ordered Ednyfed be given a silver cup worth five marks. However, this grant was not fulfilled because the King's treasurer did not have the cup. This attests to Ednyfed's importance at the court of Llywelyn, as well as the esteem in which Ednyfed was held by Henry III. There is no further record of the results of Ednyfed's pilgrimage, but he is next recorded being summoned by Henry to negotiate another treaty in 1237, and so historian Kathryn Hurlock argues that Ednyfed completed a crusading tour of the Levant.

=== Service under Dafydd ap Llywelyn ===
Llywelyn ab Iorwerth died on 11 April 1240, and was succeeded as king of Gwynedd by his son Dafydd. However, Dafydd had an elder brother named Gruffudd, the son of Llywarch by his mistress Tangwystl, daughter of Llywarch Goch. Llywelyn had intended that his younger son Dafydd would succeed him because Dafydd was both the product of a marriage sanctified by the Church and of Angevin ancestry by virtue of his being a grandson of King John. While illegitimate in the eyes of the Church, Gruffudd could claim support from much of the nobility of Gwynedd because his birth by a pre-marital liaison was no obstacle to his accession to the kingship of Gwynedd under Welsh law. Despite being granted some territory in Gwynedd during Llywelyn's reign, Gruffudd plotted against his father and brother in response to his being passed over in the succession, and was gaoled by Llywelyn from 1228 to 1234 and by Dafydd shortly before their father's death. Within a month of Llywelyn's death, Dafydd was humiliated by Henry III by the terms of the Treaty of Gloucester, signed on 15 May 1240, which saw Gruffudd released and Dafydd stripped of the homage done to his father by the barons of Wales. Ednyfed was an arbitrator in land disputes brought about by the terms of this treaty, and was one of four leading men who swore to ensure Dafydd's observance of the treaty. Even though Ednyfed Fychan was Gruffudd's stepfather, Ednyfed supported Dafydd, and even represented Dafydd in a plea between the prince and Gruffudd.

In August 1241, after a week-long campaign launched from Chester, Henry III humiliated Dafydd further, forcing him to sign the Treaty of Gwerneigron on 29 August 1241, and even more humiliating terms in London on 24 October that year. Dafydd was stripped of all the lands his father had won since 1215, Gruffudd and his son Owain Goch were taken into the Tower of London by the king, pending a partition of the remaining lands of Gwynedd between them. Ednyfed, together with his son Hywel, bishop of St Asaph, swore to ensure Dafydd would follow the terms of this treaty as well.

Gruffudd died in a botched attempt to escape from the Tower of London on St David's Day in 1244. Consequently, a revolt erupted throughout Wales against royal rule, and Dafydd acted as its leader. While enjoying some initial successes, Dafydd's alliance was defeated in late 1245. In his last recorded action on behalf of the princes of Gwynedd, Ednyfed led a group of envoys parlaying with Henry III at his court at Degannwy sometime in 1245. Dafydd died on 25 February 1246, and an English annalist writing in Chester records Ednyfed's death in the same year: he was memorialised as justiciarius Wallie, further suggesting he held legal authority in Gwynedd, though according to David Stephenson it is "highly unlikely" that the use of the title by an English chronicle"reflects Venedotian usage the middle of the thirteenth century.

== Elegy ==
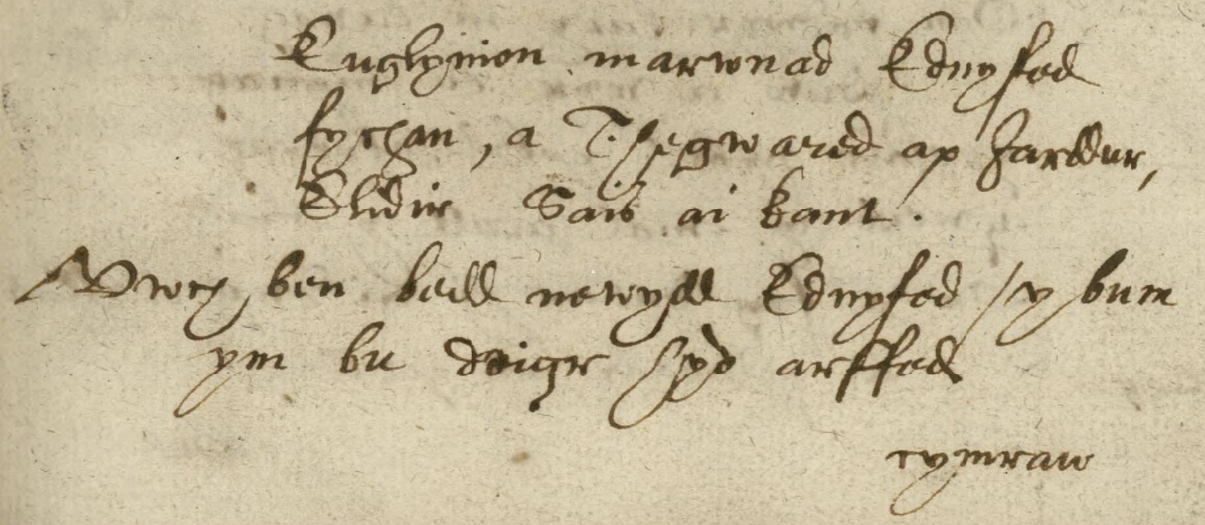
The beginning of Elidir Sais II's elegy to Ednyfed Fychan and Tegwared ab Iarddur

Together with a certain obscure nobleman named Tegwared ab Iarddur, Ednyfed was the recipient of a marwnad, or elegy, by the court poet Elidir Sais II. This poem is preserved a seventeenth-century manuscript known as Liber B, copied by the seventeenth-century priest and antiquary John Davies of Mallwyd. The source of John Davies' copy of the poem is unclear. Elidir's poem does not survive in the Hendregadredd Manuscript, the most important source for twelfth- and thirteenth-century early Welsh court poetry, or the Red Book of Hergest, though Nerys Ann Jones postulates the poem was originally copied on now-lost folios in the third quire of the Hendregadredd Manuscript.

Elidir Sais opens the elegy with a dramatic picture of himself standing above Ednyfed's freshly dug grave. In the first three englyn, he praises Ednyfed and Tegwared individually, then jointly. He highlights their generosity and support for poets, but he also emphasises their ferocity in battle. The earth is portrayed as an actively destructive and malevolent force, while the grave closes inescapably around the dead, like honeysuckle around a branch. However, the hope of heaven becomes a certainty at the end. Ednyfed's role as a distain is not explicitly mentioned, but his and Tegwared's status as noblemen is apparent from the reference to their being glyw parchfawr am eu perchen 'warriors of great fame around their lord' at the end of the poem, though this may be a reference to God. Ednyfed is the first lay official in medieval Wales to whom there is surviving poetry. There are no surviving poems to court officials of the twelfth century. Ednyfed's successor Goronwy also was the recipient of two elegies, and Goronwy's son another. Because of this, David Stephenson suggested that "it would seem that the leading officials might have been beginning to rival the prince himself".

Uwchben bedd newydd Ednyfed–y bûm,
Im bu deigr hyd arfled;
Cymraw Lloegr, cymrwyn lliwed,
Cyman ged wythran weithred.

Gweithred Tegwared! Cyn tŷ gweryd–llawr
Llawen beirdd o'i wynfyd;
Gnawd oedd ei wayw yn waedlyd;
O waedlan, rhuddai fan ryd.

Rhodwydd ar Gymru oedd ar gyman–llu,
Llary Ednyfed Fychan;
Oedd ban gawr am ben garthan
Pan gafas aerwas eurwan.

Erwan im galar galan Hyddfref–ddwyn,
Mau ei ddwys ddioddef.
Tyciant eidduniant! Addef
Tegwared, Ednyfed, nef!

Nodded ni'm rhodded rhag rhysgyr–arfau
Arfod Cai a Bedwyr;
Yng ngorofn trai, trais fyfyr,
Yng ngwriawr cadwawr, cedwyr.

O'm cedwyr Lary, ni law-wag–daear,
Duw a ŵyr eu manag;
Gorsin pybl, pobl ofynag,
Gwers y mâl, arall y mag.

O'r a fag daear, hi a'i dwg–o'i phlant,
A'i phlaoedd a'm gorllwg.
Bu rhôn im am dragon ddrwg,
Dreigioedd amlaen oedd amlwg.

Oedd amlwg aerlladd cyn oerllen–gwyddfedd
Fal gwyddfid cylch gwrysgen.
Glyw parchfawr am eu Perchen,
A'u peirch Duw Dofydd uchben.

— Elidir Sais, 'Marwnad Ednyfed Fychan a Thegwared ab Iarddur'
Translation:

I was above the fresh grave of Ednyfed,
I had tears up to my breast;
England's terror, one causing an army's sadness,
[The man with] angry deeds [and a] perfect gift.

Deeds of Tegwared! Before [he had] a house of earthy soil
Poets were happy because of his prosperity;
It was usual [that] his spear was bloody;
Because of a massacre, the ford's edge was red.

A defence on Wales that stood before a dignified host,
Generous Ednyfed Fychan;
Loud was the shout around the commander of the battlefield
When [the] warrior had an excellent raid.

Bearing grief on the calends of October [is] torturous for me
Its intense suffering is mine.
Success of a wish! An abode [for]
Tegwared [and] Ednyfed [in] heaven!

I was not given protection from the attack of arms
[Of the] battle of Cai and Bedwyr;
In the terror of [an army's] flight, [some] recalled [their] might,
In a battle of a lord of conflict, warriors.

Because of my Giver [to] warriors, the earth is not wanting,
God knows their story;
Sustainer of peoples, hope of a people,
At one time He destroys, [at] another time He nourishes.

Of what the earth nourishes, she takes from her children,
And her plagues and my expecting.
I had [the pain of] a spear because of harm to chiefs,
The fighters who were prominent in the front [of battle].

Killing in battle before the grave was evident
Like a honeysuckle around a branch.
[And the] highly respected heroes around their Owner,
The Lord God bless them above.

— Translation of the poem's Modern Welsh paraphrase by J. E. Caerwyn Williams and Peredur Lynch

There is not much biographical information related about Ednyfed in the elegy, though Ednyfed is compared to two of Arthur's warriors Cai and Bedwyr, and praised for his generosity and skill in warfare, especially against the English. This may be a reference to the feat which won him his coat of arms, but it is also a standard topos in poetry of the period. Elidir's elegy for Ednyfed and Tegwared is also curious because it is one poem sung to two different subjects who are not connected in any surviving genealogy. However, it is possible they were somehow related, as joint elegies for relatives are known elsewhere in Middle Welsh court poetry. They may also have been joint recipients of an elegy because they died on the same day: Elidir says "Erwan ym galar galan Hyddfref — ddwyn" "Bearing grief on the calends of October [is] torturous for me", which suggests Ednyfed and Tegwared died on 1 October 1246.

== Ednyfed and the role of the distain ==
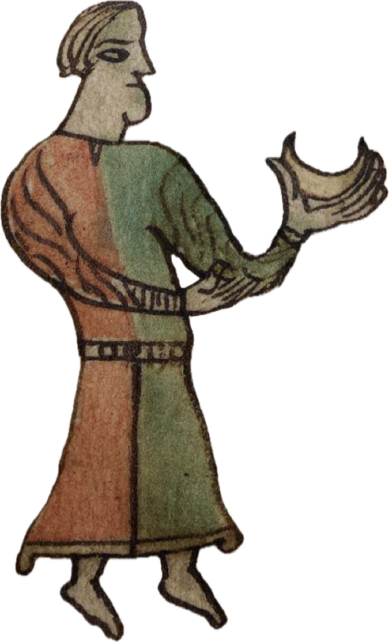
The dẏsteẏn with his dish, from Peniarth MS 28

Ednyfed's tenure as distain appears to have coincided with great changes in the role, though Ednyfed is the first distain about whom much is known. The role appears in the Welsh law texts as the third of the king's officers, "chief over all the officials". The name of the office comes from the Old English disċ-þeġn, a term originally referring to a dish-bearer in the Anglo-Saxon court. The distain's duties as recorded in the native Welsh laws state he was supposed to be in charge of the kitchens of the court, and it was his duty to hand round the 'supper-money' paid to the other officials. This arrangement was clearly obsolete by the thirteenth century, yet even the Latin translations of the laws do not translate distain as senescallus or justiciarius, as do other contemporary Latin sources, but instead as asselca 'follower, servant', a title more appropriate for one in a domestic role. Although the title originates from Old English, the role itself is likely much older, corresponding to the Irish position of rannaire 'food-distributor', and the role may originally have been referred to by the name swyddwr.

However, the evidence of Ednyfed's service in this role is markedly different from a chief domestic servant, suggesting the nature of the office changed drastically in the early thirteenth century. Numerous indications suggest he was the prince's closest regular adviser throughout the century, rather than simply being the chief manager of his household as depicted in the laws. This is evident from his frequent presence working with the prince, witnessing his charters and other documents, and carrying out diplomatic missions on his behalf. In lists of witnesses to charters or diplomatic envoys, Ednyfed is almost always at the head of the list of the prince's ministers, with his name generally following those of ecclesiastical dignitaries and subject rulers. This involvement in judicial and military matters is particularly noteworthy, especially when compared to the functions granted to him in the laws. His military functions came apparently at the expense of the penteulu, captain of the household troop, whom the laws state should be a near relative of the ruler. It might have been safer for the prince to entrust its leadership to a trusted servant, rather than to an official whose lineage and position made him a possible subversive element in the kingdom.

== Marriages and family ==
Ednyfed was twice married, first to Tangwystl, daughter of Llywarch ap Brân, brother-in-law and perhaps distain of Owain Gwynedd. Tangwystl was the mother of Ednyfed's children Tudur (died 1281), lord of Y Nant and Llangynhafal, Llywelyn, lord of Creuddyn, Hywel, Bishop of St Asaph (1240–47), Rhys, lord of Garthgarmon, Cynwrig, also lord of Creuddyn, and Iorwerth y Gwahanglwyfus ('the leprous').

Ednyfed's second wife was Gwenllian (died 1236), daughter of the Lord Rhys of Deheubarth (died 1197). Gwenllian's first husband was apparently Rhodri ab Owain Gwynedd (died 1195), though it has been suggested Rhys had two daughters named Gwenllian, just as he had two sons named Maredudd. Ednyfed's most prominent sons were the product of his marriage with Gwenllian, namely Goronwy, lord of Trecastell, and Gruffudd, lord of Henglawdd, both of whom followed him as disteiniaid in the kingdom of Gwynedd. Additionally, Gwenllian was mother to Ednyfed's daughters Gwladus, who married Tegwared ap Cynwrig, and Gwenllian, who married Tegwared y Baiswen, the illegitimate son of Llywelyn ab Iorwerth. Ednyfed also had two daughters by unknown mothers, Angharad and Gwenllian, as well as a son, Tudur Gwilltyn.

Two of Ednyfed's brothers also served as servants to Llywelyn ab Iorwerth and Dafydd ap Llywelyn. Goronwy ap Cynfrig appeared as an envoy to Henry III in 1232, and he was given as a hostage to the king by Dafydd in 1241, only to defect to English service in 1245 while in England. Heilyn ap Cynfrig is also recorded as having served in the government of Gwynedd in the years 1222–1241.

Ednyfed's service to Llywelyn was rewarded by not only grants of lands in his native Rhos, but also in Anglesey, Ceredigion, and Ystrad Tywi. Ednyfed's lineage enjoyed unique privileges regarding their tenure on this land. This exempted him and his descendants from many services and renders owed to the prince except military service, which would be paid for at the prince's expense. This special tenure was extended to his descendants, known as the Wyrion Eden, though even Ednyfed's brothers and their descendants held land under the same privileges. Because his more distant relatives held land under this tenure in Rhufoniog and Rhos, it may have been intended to aid in the defence of important routes into Snowdonia. This arrangement lasted even after Edward I's conquest of Wales, and allowed members of the dynasty to become wealthier than other nobles owning similar amounts of land.

== Legacy ==
=== Llys Euryn and St Trillo's chapel ===
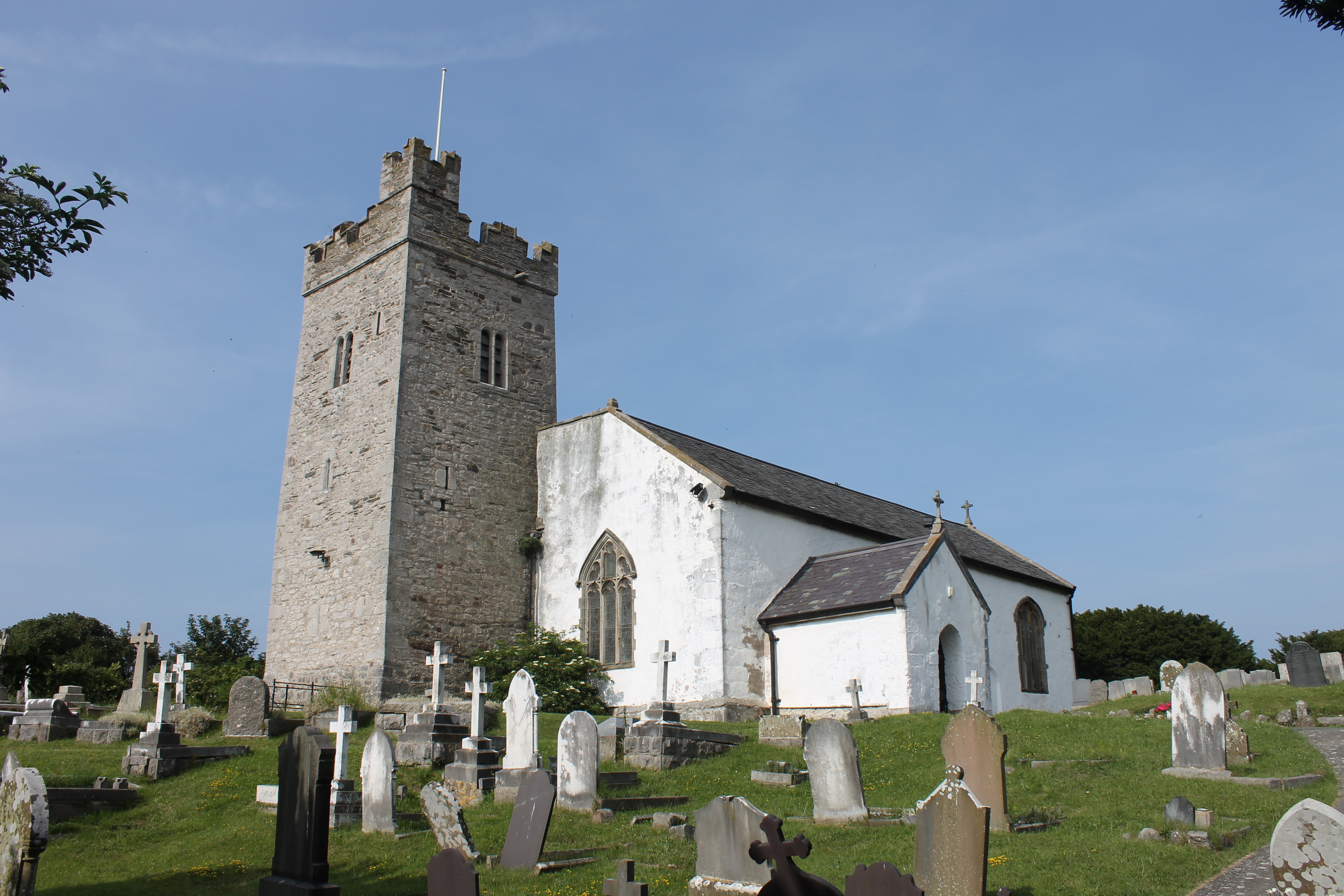
St Trillo's church, Rhos-on-Sea, Ednyfed's chapel

Ednyfed Fychan appears to have built a manor at Bryn Euryn or Dinerth, overlooking the modern towns of Colwyn Bay and Rhos-on-Sea, though none of this construction survives. In a meeting which also passed the sentence of execution on William de Braose held at the manor of Ystrad south of Denbigh on 1 May 1230, Ednyfed was issued letters patent by Llywelyn ab Iorwerth confirming his purchase from his distant cousins of land around the St Trillo's church, to which Ednyfed was to pay two shillings each Easter. Ednyfed had a chapel erected adjoining an earlier twelfth-century church at Dinerth, now dedicated to Saint Trillo. However, much of the fabric of the modern church dates from the sixteenth century, with only two arches surviving at the west end of its north wall from the thirteenth century chapel. The church was also mentioned in the Norwich Taxation of 1254, which Pope Innocent IV commissioned in order to assess the value of clerical property for taxation. (Note: A sepulchral slab rests in the porch, which reads HIC IACET D'N'S EDNEVED QUO'DAM VICARIUS DE DYNEYRT C'S AN' PROPICIETUR DEUS AMEN "Here lies lord Ednyfed, once vicar of Dinerth, on whose soul may God have mercy, Amen". This slab was once thought to be connected to Ednyfed Fychan, but it instead commemorates another Ednyfed, as at least different two men of the name were parish priest there in the late thirteenth and early fifteenth centuries. The priest of the late thirteenth century is more likely to be the Ednyfed of this slab based on the Lombardic lettering of the inscription, which fell out of use in the mid-fourteenth century.)

=== Ednyfed's successors as disteiniaid ===
Ednyfed appears to have left an expectation that his sons would follow him into the highest levels of service to the kings of Gwynedd. This expectation was fulfilled, and every distain after Ednyfed until the conquest of Gwynedd in 1282 was his son or grandson. Ednyfed's eldest son Tudur served Dafydd ap Llywelyn together with his father. However, he was seized by Henry III during Dafydd's rebellion in late 1245, and kept in the Tower of London until his release in late 1246, when he swore fealty to the king and promised to not countenance the king's enemies, with his son Heilyn kept in the Tower as surety until 1263. With their eldest brother Tudur in the Tower when Gwynedd Uwch Conwy was partitioned between Owain Goch and Llywelyn ap Gruffudd in 1247, Goronwy and Gruffudd ab Ednyfed became their respective disteiniaid. Their early appearance in service of the sons of Gruffudd ap Llywelyn may suggest they were supporters of Gruffudd himself rather than his brother Dafydd even during Dafydd's reign and their father Ednyfed's tenure as his distain.

Llywelyn reunited Gwynedd in 1255 and Gruffudd died in about 1256; afterwards, Goronwy became Llywelyn's distain in turn. (Note: For a handlist of records of Gruffudd's actions as distain, see Stephenson 2014, pp. 214–15.) Goronwy served in this position for over a decade and is recorded as the prince's senescallus in the Treaty of Montgomery, dying in 1268. (Note: For a handlist of records of Goronwy's actions as distain, see Stephenson 2014, p. 213.) Goronwy was succeeded by Ednyfed's eldest son Tudur, who was distain until his death in 1281. (Note: For a handlist of records of Tudur's actions as distain, see Stephenson 2014, pp. 218–221.) Even Dafydd ab Einion Fychan, the last recorded distain of Gwynedd who died in Brycheiniog alongside Llywelyn ap Gruffudd in late 1282, was a grandson of Ednyfed as his mother was Angharad, daughter of Ednyfed Fychan. According to historian Glyn Roberts, "[e]ven before the conquest of 1282... Ednyfed's immediate descendants formed a 'ministerial aristocracy' of considerable wealth, and their widespread possessions, combined with the favourable terms on which they were held, made them the forerunners of that class of Welsh squires whose emergence is characteristic of the post-conquest period."

=== Penmynydd family ===
Because of his great number of sons and holdings, Ednyfed Fychan had important descendants throughout Wales, including the most famous Welsh-language poet, Dafydd ap Gwilym. However, his most politically important descendants were the Penmynydd family. The Penmynydd family was descended from Ednyfed's son Goronwy. Goronwy ab Ednyfed's son Tudur Hen was a major landowner and administrator in North Wales, as was his son Goronwy ap Tudur Hen and Goronwy's sons Hywel and Tudur ap Goronwy. These brothers were also important patrons of Gruffudd ap Maredudd ap Dafydd, the last of the gogynfeirdd, or 'rather early poets' a term used to describe the poets who composed in the style of the Poets of the Princes (c. 1100–1283). The Owen Tudor who married Catherine of Valois and was grandfather to the future Henry VII was a grandson of Tudur ap Goronwy, making Ednyfed Fychan the originator of the dynasty. The junior members of this family continued to own land in Anglesey until the late eighteenth century.

== Arms ==
Coat of arms of Ednyfed Fychan
Notes The earliest descriptions of this coat have an unorthodox colour on colour, a chevron Sable on a field Gules. The chevron seems to have been first changed to Ermine, or Ermines, and then to Argent, perhaps to satisfy the rules of armoury. The arms are also found on the tomb of Ednyfed's descendant Goronwy Fychan and his wife Myfanwy Fychan in St Gredifael's Church, Penmynydd and in the fabric of this same church, as well as on a fifteenth-century baptismal font in Bangor Cathedral. Escutcheon Gules, a chevron Argent between three Englishmen's heads couped at the neck proper.

== Ancestry ==
Ancestors of Ednyfed Fychan

16. Idnerth ab Edryd
8. Gwgon ap Idnerth
4. Iorwerth ap Gwgon
2. Cynfrig ab Iorwerth
20. Pasgen ap Trahaearn
10. Rhirid ap Pasgen
5. Gwenllian ferch Rhirid
1. Ednyfed Fychan ap Cynfrig
24. Rhiwallon ap Dingad
12. Cynfrig ap Rhiwallon
25. Letis ferch Cadwaladr ap Peredur Goch
6. Hwfa ap Cynfrig
13. Annes ferch Idnerth Benfras
3. Angharad ferch Hwfa
28. Gruffudd ap Cynan
14. Owain Gwynedd
29. Angharad ferch Owain
7. Gwenllian ferch Owain Gwynedd

== Works cited ==
=== Primary sources ===
- Andrews, Rhian M., ed. (2007). Welsh Court Poems. Cardiff: University of Wales Press. ISBN 9780708321089.
- Bartrum, P. C., ed. (1966). Early Welsh Genealogical Tracts. Cardiff: University of Wales Press. ISBN 9780708300497.
  ——, ed. (1974). Welsh Genealogies: AD 300-1400. Cardiff: University of Wales Press. doi:10.20391/40837b6f-1887-4afd-9c6e-9b7e3a122693. ISBN 070830561X. Archived from the original on 6 June 2023.
- Bromwich, Rachel, ed. (2014) [1961]. Trioedd Ynys Prydein: The Triads of the Island of Britain (4th ed.). Cardiff: University of Wales Press. ISBN 9781783161454.
- Christie, R. C., ed. (1887). Annales Cestrienses. Chester: Record Society of Lancashire and Cheshire. IA recordsociety14recouoft.
- Edwards, John Goronwy, ed. (1940). Littere Wallie preserved in Liber A in the Public Record Office. Cardiff: University of Wales Press. hdl:20.500.14106/0506. Archived from the original on 12 December 2025.
- Jenkins, Dafydd, ed. (1986). The Law of Hywel Dda: Law Texts from Medieval Wales. Llandysul: Gomer Press. ISBN 0863832776.
- Jones, Thomas, ed. (1973) [1955]. Brut y Tywysogion, or the Chronicle of the Princes: Red Book of Hergest version (2nd ed.). Cardiff: University of Wales Press. ISBN 0708301045.
- Lewis, Barry J., ed. (2023) [2003]. Gwaith Gruffudd ap Maredudd I: Canu i Deulu Penmynydd [The Work of Gruffudd ap Maredudd I: Singing to the Family of Penmynydd] (PDF). Cyfres Beirdd yr Uchelwyr (in Welsh). Vol. 24 (PDF ed.). Aberystwyth: Centre for Advanced Welsh and Celtic Studies. ISBN 978-0947531270. Archived from the original (PDF) on 29 March 2023.
- Luard, Henry Richards, ed. (1876). Matthæi Parisiensis, monachi Sancti Albani, Chronica majora [The Chronica Majora of Matthew Paris, monk of St Albans] (in Latin). Vol. III, A.D. 1216 – A.D. 1239. London: HM Treasury. IA matthiparisien03pari.
  ——, ed. (1890). Flores Historiarum [Flowers of History] (in Latin). Vol. II, A.D. 1067–A.D. 1264. London: HM Treasury. IA floreshistoriar00readgoog.
- Lunt, W. E., ed. (1926). The Valuation of Norwich. Oxford: Clarendon Press.
- Maxwell Lyte, H.C., ed. (1901). Patent Rolls of the Reign of Henry III (in Latin). Vol. 1, A.D. 1216–1225. London: HM Stationery Office. IA patentrollsreig00sirgoog.
  ——, ed. (1902). Close Rolls of the Reign of Henry III (in Latin). Vol. 3, A.D. 1234–1237. London: HM Stationery Office. IA closerollsofreig03grea.
  ——, ed. (1903). Patent Rolls of the Reign of Henry III (in Latin). Vol. 2, A.D. 1225–1232. London: HM Stationery Office. IA patentrollsreig03lytegoog.
  ——, ed. (1906). Calendar of the Patent Rolls of the reign of Henry III. Vol. 3, A.D. 1232–1247. London: HM Stationery Office. IA patentrollsreig01lytegoog.
  ——, ed. (1912). Calendar of Various Chancery Rolls: Supplementary Close rolls, Welsh Rolls, Scutage Rolls: A. D. 1277 – 1326. London: HM Stationery Office. IA cu31924026113880.
  ——, ed. (1916). Calendar of Inquisitions Miscellaneous (Chancery). Vol. 1. London: HM Stationery Office. IA calendarofinquis01lond.
- Pryce, Huw, ed. (2005). The Acts of Welsh Rulers, 1120–1283. Cardiff: University of Wales Press. ISBN 9780708318973. IA actsofwelshruler0000unse.
- Williams, J. E. Caerwyn; Lynch, Peredur, eds. (1994). Gwaith Meilyr Brydydd a'i Digsynyddion [The work of Meilyr Brydydd and his Descendants]. Cyfres Beirdd y Tywysogion (in Welsh). Vol. 1. Cardiff: University of Wales Press. ISBN 0708311873.
- Wright, Neil, ed. (1985). Historia Regum Britannie of Geoffrey of Monmouth I: Bern, Burgerbibliothek, MS 568 (in Latin). Cambridge: D. S. Brewer. ISBN 9780859912112.
- Wynne, William, ed. (1697). The History of Wales: Comprehending the Lives and Succession of the Princes of Wales, from Cadwalader the last King, to Lhewelyn the last Prince, of British Blood. With a short Account of the Affairs of Wales, under the kings of England. London: Mary Clark. IA historyofwalesco00cara.

=== Secondary sources ===
- Andrews, Rhian M. (2017). "Llywelyn ab Iorwerth a'r Môr Coch: Gwaith Dafydd Benfras, Cerdd 19" [Llywelyn ab Iorwerth and the Red Sea: Gwaith Dafydd Benfras, poem 19]. Dwned (in Welsh). 23. Department of Welsh, Aberystwyth University: 11–40.
- Anglo, Sydney (1961). "The British History In Early Tudor Propaganda: with an Appendix of Manuscript Pedigrees of The Kings of England, Henry VI to Henry VIII". Bulletin of the John Rylands Library. 44. Manchester: Manchester University Press: 17–48. doi:10.7227/BJRL.44.1.2.
- Bartrum, P. C. (2009) [1993]. A Welsh Classical Dictionary: People in History and Legend up to about A.D. 1000. Aberystwyth: National Library of Wales. ISBN 9780907158738. Archived from the original on 13 October 2022.
- Carr, A. D. (2004). "Tudor family, forebears of (per. c. 1215–1404)". Oxford Dictionary of National Biography (online ed.). Oxford: Oxford University Press. doi:10.1093/ref:odnb/77357. (Subscription, Wikipedia Library access or UK public library membership required.)
- CPAT Eastern Conwy Churches Survey Project (1999). The Historic Churches of Eastern Conwy. Welshpool: Clwyd-Powys Archaeological Trust. Archived from the original on 9 September 2025.
- Davies, R. R. (1991) [1987]. The Age of Conquest: Wales 1063–1415. Oxford: Oxford University Press. ISBN 0198201982. IA ageofconquestwal0000davi.
- Davies, William Llewelyn (1959). "LLYWARCH ap BRAN (fl. c. 1137), founder of one of the 'Fifteen (Noble) Tribes of Gwynedd'". Dictionary of Welsh Biography. Aberystwyth: National Library of Wales.
- Evans, Dylan Foster; Roberts, Sara Elin (2007). "'Myn Pedr, ni wn pwy ydwyd', ar drywydd Dafydd ap Gwilym" ['By Peter, I don't know who you are', in pursuit of Dafydd ap Gwilym] (PDF). dafyddapgwilym.net (in Welsh). Swansea: Swansea University. Archived (PDF) from the original on 24 March 2016.
- Feer, Esther; Jones, Nerys Ann (2005). "A poet and his patrons: the early career of Llywarch Brydydd y Moch". In Fulton, Helen (ed.). Medieval Celtic Literature and Society. Dublin: Four Courts Press. pp. 132–162. ISBN 1851829288.
- Griffiths, Ralph A.; Thomas, Roger S. (1997) [1985]. The making of the Tudor dynasty (Paperback ed.). Stroud: Alan Sutton Press. ISBN 0862994276. IA makingoftudordyn0000grif.
- Hubbard, Edward (1986). The Buildings of Wales: Clwyd (Denbighshire and Flintshire). Harmondsworth: Penguin Books / University of Wales Press. ISBN 0140710523. IA clwyddenbighshir0000hubb.
- Hurlock, Kathryn (2011). Wales and the Crusades, c. 1095–1291. Cardiff: University of Wales Press. ISBN 9780708324271.
- Huws, Daniel (2000). Medieval Welsh Manuscripts. Aberystwyth: National Library of Wales. ISBN 0708316026.
- Norgate, Kate (2023) [2004]. "Joan [Siwan] (d. 1237), princess of Gwynedd, wife of Llywelyn ab Iorwerth". Oxford Dictionary of National Biography (online ed.). Oxford: Oxford University Press. doi:10.1093/ref:odnb/14819. (Subscription, Wikipedia Library access or UK public library membership required.)
- Jones, Nerys Ann; Pryce, Huw, eds. (1996). Yr Arglwydd Rhys [The Lord Rhys] (in Welsh). Cardiff: University of Wales Press. ISBN 0708313493.
  —— (2003). "Ffynonellau Canu Beirdd y Tywysogion" [Sources of the Poetry of the Poets of the Princes]. Studia Celtica (in Welsh). 44. Cardiff: University of Wales Press: 81–125.
- Lloyd, J. E. (1912). A History of Wales: from the Earliest Times to the Edwardian Conquest. Vol. 2. London: Longmans, Green & Co. IA historyofwalesfr02lloyuoft.
- Pierce, T. Jones (1959a). "GRUFFYDD ap LLYWELYN (died 1244), prince". Dictionary of Welsh Biography. Aberystwyth: National Library of Wales.
  —— (1959b). "OWAIN TUDOR (c. 1400–1461), courtier". Dictionary of Welsh Biography. Aberystwyth: National Library of Wales.
  —— (1959c). "TUDOR family of Penmynydd, Anglesey - later members". Dictionary of Welsh Biography. Aberystwyth: National Library of Wales.
- RCAHMW (2005a). "Llys Euryn Remains". Coflein. Aberystwyth: RCAHMW. Archived from the original on 12 January 2024.
  —— (2005b). "St Trillo's Church, Llandrillo Yn Rhos". Coflein. Aberystwyth: RCAHMW. Archived from the original on 26 December 2024.
  —— (2005c). "Bryn Derwin, site of Battle". Coflein. Aberystwyth: RCAHMW. Archived from the original on 30 January 2026.
- Rhŷs, John; Anwyl, Edward; Bosanquet, Robert Carr; Hughes, Robert; Jones, Griffith Hartwell; Morgan, William Edwin Llewellyn; Vincent-Evans, Evan, eds. (1914). An Inventory of the Ancient Monuments in Wales and Monmouthshire. Vol. IV: County of Denbigh. London: HM Stationery Office.
- Roberts, Glyn (1969). ""Wyrion Eden": the Anglesey Descendants of Ednyfed Fychan in the Fourteenth Century". In Roberts, Glyn (ed.). Aspects of Welsh History. Cardiff: University of Wales Press. pp. 179–214. ISBN 0900768223.
  —— (2020) [1959]. "EDNYFED FYCHAN, (EDNYFED ap CYNWRIG) and his descendants, noble family of Gwynedd.". Dictionary of Welsh Biography. Aberystwyth: National Library of Wales.
- Russell, Paul (2000). "Swydd, Swyddog, Swyddwr: Office, Officer and Official". In Charles-Edwards, Thomas; Owen, Morfydd E.; Russell, Paul (eds.). The Welsh King and His Court. Cardiff: University of Wales Press. pp. 281–295. ISBN 0708316271.
- Siddons, Michael Powell (1993). The Development of Welsh Heraldry. Vol. 2. Aberystwyth: National Library of Wales. ISBN 090715851X.
- Smith, J. Beverley (1986). "Dynastic Succession in Medieval Wales". Bulletin of the Board of Celtic Studies. 33. Cardiff: University of Wales Press: 199–232.
  —— (2014) [1998]. Llywelyn ap Gruffudd: Prince of Wales (New ed.). Cardiff: University of Wales Press. ISBN 9781783160068.
- Stephenson, David (2014) [1984]. Political Power in Medieval Gwynedd: Governance and the Welsh Princes. Studies in Welsh History (2nd ed.). Cardiff: University of Wales Press. ISBN 9781783160044. IA politicalpowerin0000step.
  —— (2016). Medieval Powys: Kingdom, Principality and Lordships, 1132-1293. Studies in Celtic History. Woodbridge: Boydell Press. ISBN 9781783271405.
  —— (2025). Heirs to the Princes: The Welsh Administrative Elite from the Edwardian Conquest to the Black Death. Cardiff: University of Wales Press. ISBN 9781837722761.
- Tucker, Norman (1965). The Parish Church of Llandrillo yn Rhos.
- Turvey, Roger (2007). Llywelyn the Great. Llandysul: Gomer Press. ISBN 9781843237471.
- Williams, J. E. Caerwyn (1997). The Court Poet in Medieval Wales: An Essay. Lampeter: Edwin Mellen Press. ISBN 0773486348.

Preceded by Gwyn ab Ednywain	Distain of the Kingdom of Gwynedd c. 1217 – 1246	Succeeded by Goronwy ab Ednyfed Fychan; Gruffudd ab Ednyfed Fychan

The Penmynydd family and their relatives
Disteiniaid of the Kingdom of Gwynedd Members of the Penmynydd family Members of the House of Tudor

Tangwystl ferch Llywarch	Ednyfed Fychan d. 1246	Gwenllian ferch Rhys d. 1236	Einion ap Gwalchmai fl. 1202–1223
Llywelyn ab Ednyfed	Tudur ab Ednyfed d. c. 1281	Gruffudd ab Ednyfed Fychan d. c. 1256	Goronwy ab Ednyfed Fychan d. 1268	Angharad ferch Ednyfed	Einion Fychan ab Einion
Rhys ap Llywelyn	Heilin ap Tudur fl. 1246–1282	Rhys Hen ap Gruffudd d. 1284	Tudur Hen ap Goronwy d. 1311	Dafydd ab Einion Fychan d. c. 1282
Gwilym ap Rhys	Gruffudd ap Heilin d. c. 1340	Gruffudd Llwyd ap Rhys d. 1335	Goronwy ap Tudur Hen d. 1331	Tomos ap Llewelyn d. 1343
Ardudful ferch Gwilym	Gwilym ap Gruffudd d. c. 1370	Hywel ap Goronwy d. c. 1367	Tudur ap Goronwy d. c. 1367	Marged ferch Tomos	Elen ferch Tomos	Gruffudd Fychan II
Dafydd Llwyd ap Gwilym Gam d. c. 1350–1380	Gruffudd ap Gwilym d. 1405	Goronwy Fychan ap Tudur d. 1382	Rhys ap Tudur executed 1412	Ednyfed ap Tudur d. 1382	Gwilym ap Tudur d. 1413	Maredudd ap Tudur d. 1406	Owain Glyndŵr d. c. 1416
Gwilym ap Gruffudd d. 1431	Morfudd ferch Goronwy	Owen Tudor c. 1400–1461
Tudur Fychan	Edmund Tudor c. 1430–1456; 1st Earl of Richmond	Jasper Tudor, Duke of Bedford; 1431–1495	David Owen
Owain ap Tudur d. 1504/1505	Henry VII; 1457–1509; King of England
William ab Owain d. 1523?	John ab Owain	Richard ab Owain d. 1527 (?)	Arthur; 1486–1502; Prince of Wales	Henry VIII; 1491–1547; King of England
Richard Owen d. 1558	William Bold	Edward VI; 1537–1553; King of England	Mary I 1516–1558; Queen of England	Elizabeth I 1533–1603; Queen of England
Richard Owen Theodor (III)	David Owen Theodor d. 1624
Richard Owen Theodor (IV) fl. 1645
Richard Owen Theodor (V) fl. 1665
Richard Owen Theodor (VI) fl. 1669
