= Penmynydd =

Village in Anglesey, Wales

- Village and community
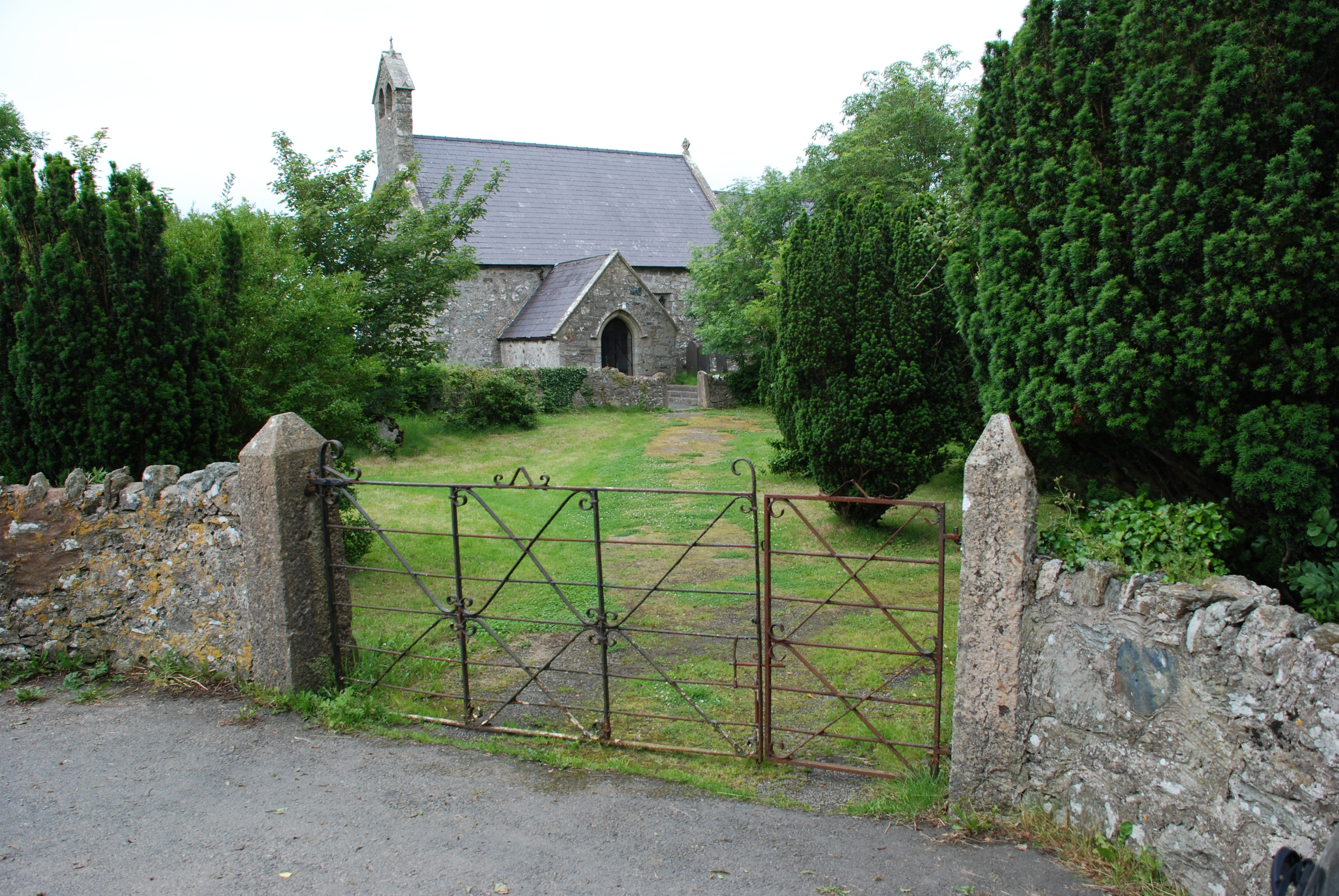
- St Gredifael's Church

- Location within Anglesey
- Principal area: Isle of Anglesey
- Country: Wales
- Sovereign state: United Kingdom
- Police: North Wales
- Fire: North Wales
- Ambulance: Welsh
- UK Parliament: Ynys Môn
- Senedd Cymru – Welsh Parliament: Bangor Conwy Môn
- List of places UK Wales Anglesey 53.24475°N 4.23442°W Map of the community

Penmynydd (/pɛnˈmʌnɪð/ pen-MUN-idh, Welsh: [pɛnˈmənɪð]), meaning "top of the mountain" in Welsh, is a village on Anglesey, Wales, and the main village in the community of Penmynydd and Star. It is known for being the birthplace of the Tudors of Penmynydd, which became the House of Tudor. The population of the community according to the United Kingdom Census 2011 was 465. The community also includes the village of Star and the hamlet of Castellior (53°14′43″N 4°11′01″W).

== Description ==
Penmynydd is located on Anglesey off the north west coast of Wales, situated on a slight hill on the B5420 road between Menai Bridge and Llangefni, at grid reference SH510743. The Royal Mail postcode begins LL61 with a community population taken at the 2011 census of 465. Edward Greenly gave the name of the village to the Monian ‘Penmynydd Zone of Metamorphism', a Precambrian blueschist terrane stretching along the hill from Red Wharf Bay to Newborough; the blueschist event has been dated to about 550 million years ago. When Welsh nobleman Rhys ap Tudur was executed in 1412, lands of the Penmynydd family were forfeited. The village is notable for its early 17th century almshouses. The bwthyn at Minffordd was the first place on Anglesey used for Nonconformist worship in the early 18th century. The village includes the Neuadd Lwyd, a former Victorian rectory that was converted into a country-house hotel. A radio communication transmission mast was installed in 2002 a few yards north of the village at the top of the hill.

== The Tudor family ==
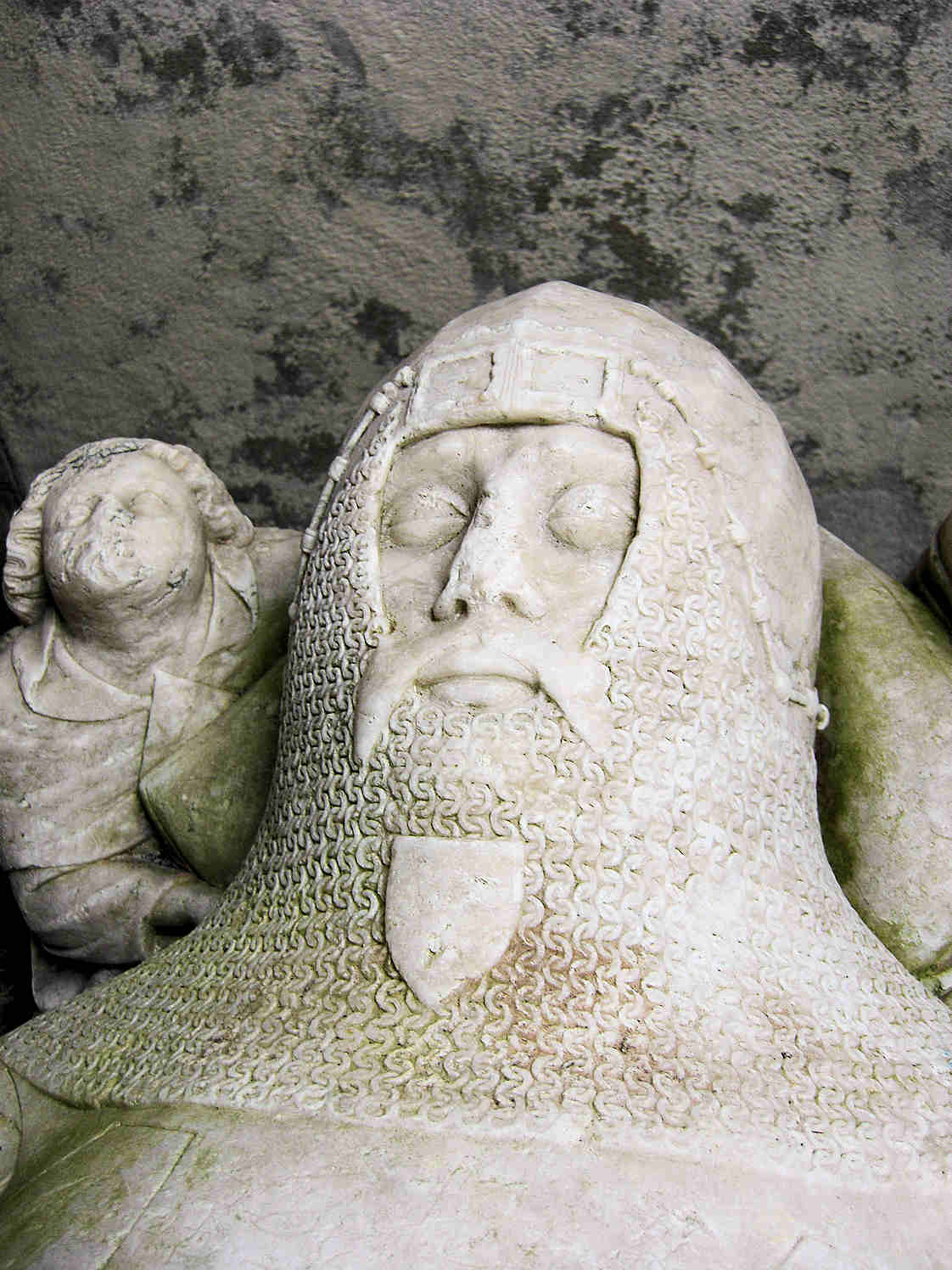
Effigy of Goronwy ap Tudur at St Gredifael's Church, Penmynydd

Penmynydd was the home of the Tudors of Penmynydd, from which sprang the House of Tudor. In the 14th century, a resident of Penmynydd, Tudur ap Goronwy, had five sons, of whom one, Maredudd ap Tudur, was father of the Owen Tudor who joined Henry V of England's army and subsequently established himself at court. After Henry died, his widow, Catherine of Valois, married Owen Tudor in secret around 1429 and had three sons. Their grandson, Henry Tudor, successfully claimed the crown of England, becoming King Henry VII.

The village contains the Grade II* listed building Plas Penmynydd. The house was originally built in 1576 by Richard Owen Tudor, a representative of the senior line of the Tudors of Penmynydd. It was sold following the death of his descendant, another Richard Owen Tudor who had been Sheriff of Anglesey in 1657, and the house passed through several families. It was listed on 2 May 1952. In the 2000s, it was restored by Richard Cuthbertson and featured on the BBC Wales television series Hidden Houses of Wales in 2010.

== Governance ==
The community was part of the Llanfihangel Ysgeifiog electoral ward for elections to the Isle of Anglesey County Council. Following the 2012 Isle of Anglesey electoral boundary changes Penmynydd was transferred to a new multi-councillor ward of Aethwy.
