= Elidir Sais II =

Elidir Sais II (fl. ca. 1246) was a medieval Welsh language bard. His sobriquet Sais ("English") suggests he was conversant in the English language.

Rhian M. Andrews has argued Elidir Sais II is to be distinguished from Elidir Sais I, who would be active from about 1170 to about 1215. Elidir Sais II would have sung the elegies of Ednyfed Fychan and Tegwared ab Iarddur as well as the elegy of Hywel ab Arthen.

== Bibliography ==
- J.E. Caerwyn Williams (ed.), Gwaith Meilyr Brydydd a'i ddisgynyddion (Cardiff, 1994). Includes the authoritative edition of the texts.
- Andrews, Rhian M. (2017). "Llywelyn ab Iorwerth a'r Môr Coch: Gwaith Dafydd Benfras, Cerdd 19" [Llywelyn ab Iorwerth and the Red Sea: Gwaith Dafydd Benfras, poem 19]. Dwned (in Welsh). 23. Department of Welsh, Aberystwyth University: 11–40.
