= Gwyn ab Ednywain =

Distain of Gwynedd Uwch Conwy
- In office unknown – c. January 1199
- Monarch: Gruffudd ap Cynan ab Owain
- Preceded by: Unknown
- Succeeded by: Himself

Distain of Gwynedd
- In office January 1199 – Unknown
- Monarch: Llywelyn ab Iorwerth
- Preceded by: Unknown
- Succeeded by: Ednyfed Fychan

Gwyn ab Ednywain was a Welsh nobleman who served as distain to Llywelyn ab Iorwerth in the first decade of his rule over the Kingdom of Gwynedd. Before his service under Llywelyn, Gwyn was probably the distain to Gruffudd ap Cynan ab Owain Gwynedd, who was overthrown by Llywelyn in 1199.

== Bibliography ==
- Feer, Esther; Jones, Nerys Ann (2005). "A poet and his patrons: the early career of Llywarch Brydydd y Moch". In Fulton, Helen (ed.). Medieval Celtic Literature and Society. Dublin: Four Courts Press. pp. 132–162. ISBN 1851829288.
- Pryce, Huw, ed. (2005). The Acts of Welsh Rulers, 1120–1283. Cardiff: University of Wales Press. ISBN 9780708318973. IA actsofwelshruler0000unse.
- Stephenson, David (2014) [1984]. Political Power in Medieval Gwynedd, Governance and the Welsh Princes. Studies in Welsh History (Revised ed.). University of Wales Press. ISBN 9781783160044.
