= Aron ap Rhys =

Welsh Nobleman

Sir Aron ap Rhys (born ca. 1140) was a nobleman from Wales.

He married Gwenllian ferch Ednyfed Fychan, daughter of Ednyfed Fychan, and was the father of Efa ferch Aron; Jonet Verch Aron och Bleddri ap Sir Aron. He became a Knight of the Holy Sepulchre.
