= Elidir Sais I =

Elidir Sais I (ca. 1170 – ca. 1215) was a Medieval Welsh language court poet from Anglesey His sobriquet Sais ("English") suggests he was conversant in the English language, something so unusual at the time that it earned him his nickname. It may indicate he had been forced to spend some year in exile in England.

The few surviving works by Elidir are mostly religious poems on the Holy Trinity, elegies on the death of several Welsh princes and a poem remonstrating Llywelyn ab Iorwerth, King of Gwynedd, whose aggressive policies he opposed.

Recently, Rhian M. Andrews has argued that there were two poets by this name, the first of which was active until about 1215, as otherwise one poet named Elidir Sais would have had a career spanning nearly eighty years until the death of Ednyfed Fychan in 1246.

== Bibliography ==
- J.E. Caerwyn Williams (ed.), Gwaith Meilyr Brydydd a'i ddisgynyddion (Cardiff, 1994). Includes the authoritative edition of the texts.
- Henry Lewis (ed.), Hen Gerddi Crefyddol (Cardiff, 1974).
- Andrews, Rhian M. (2017). "Llywelyn ab Iorwerth a'r Môr Coch: Gwaith Dafydd Benfras, Cerdd 19" [Llywelyn ab Iorwerth and the Red Sea: Gwaith Dafydd Benfras, poem 19]. Dwned (in Welsh). 23. Department of Welsh, Aberystwyth University: 11–40.
