= Trecastell =

Coordinates: 53.206662°N 4.495228°W

- Location within Anglesey
- OS grid reference: SH 3345 7064
  - Cardiff: 131 mi (211 km)
  - London: 218 mi (351 km)
- Community: Aberffraw
- Principal area: Anglesey
- Preserved county: Gwynedd
- Country: Wales
- Sovereign state: United Kingdom
- Post town: TŶ CROES
- Police: North Wales
- Fire: North Wales
- Ambulance: Welsh
- UK Parliament: Ynys Môn
- Senedd Cymru – Welsh Parliament: Ynys Môn

Trecastell is a farm and historical site in the community of Aberffraw, Anglesey, Wales.

== See also ==
- List of localities in Wales by population
