= Gruffudd ab Ednyfed Fychan =

13th century Venedotian statesman (died c. 1256)

Distain of Gwynedd
- In office c.1247–c.1256
- Monarch: Llywelyn ap Gruffudd
- Preceded by: Ednyfed Fychan
- Succeeded by: Goronwy ab Ednyfed Fychan

Personal details
- Died: c.1256
- Parents: Ednyfed Fychan (father); Gwenllian ferch Rhys (mother)

Gruffudd ab Ednyfed Fychan (d. c. 1256) was distain to Llywelyn ap Gruffudd, king of Gwynedd. After his father Ednyfed Fychan and Dafydd ap Llywelyn died in 1246, he became the distain in the lands apportioned to Llywelyn ap Gruffudd after the Treaty of Woodstock in 1247. Traditionally, he was thought to have been forced to flee to Ireland sometime in the principate of Llywelyn ab Iorwerth as a result of some slander concerning Llywelyn's wife, Princess Joan. He headed a group of envoys sent by Llywelyn to entreat Henry III in 1256, and presumably died shortly thereafter.

== Bibliography ==
- Stephenson, David (2014) [1984]. Political Power in Medieval Gwynedd, Governance and the Welsh Princes. Studies in Welsh History (Revised ed.). University of Wales Press. ISBN 9781783160044.
