= Goronwy ab Ednyfed Fychan =

13th century Venedotian statesman (died 1268)

Distain of Gwynedd
- In office c. 1247 – c. June 1255
- Monarch: Owain Goch ap Gruffudd
- Preceded by: Ednyfed Fychan
- Succeeded by: Gruffudd ab Ednyfed Fychan
- In office c. 1256 – 17 October 1268
- Monarch: Llywelyn ap Gruffudd
- Preceded by: Gruffudd ab Ednyfed Fychan
- Succeeded by: Tudur ab Ednyfed Fychan

Personal details
- Born: c. 1210
- Died: 17 October 1268
- Spouse: Morfudd ferch Meurig
- Children: Tudur Hen
- Parents: Ednyfed Fychan (father); Gwenllian ferch Rhys (mother)

Goronwy ab Ednyfed Fychan (c. 1210 – 17 October 1268) was distain to Llywelyn ap Gruffudd, king of Gwynedd.

== Early life and service to Llywelyn ap Gruffudd ==
Goronwy was one of the sons of Ednyfed Fychan (died 1246), seneschal to Llywelyn the Great, Prince of Wales. Goronwy's mother, Gwenllian, was daughter of Rhys ap Gruffydd.

When Llywelyn ap Gruffudd (Llywelyn the Last) rose to power in the Kingdom of Gwynedd, he brought all three of Ednyfed's sons into his service. By 1258, Llywelyn had styled himself the Prince of Wales, the same year that Goronwy had been established as his seneschal. Goronwy continued in this role for the following ten years, during which time he was involved in a variety of negotiations with the Marcher Lords, with Richard, the Bishop of Bangor, and with several other Welsh princes. Goronwy led Llywelyn's troops as far south as Gwent to combat the Marcher Lords in February 1263. He died on 17 October 1268, and was remembered by Welsh chroniclers for his wisdom and integrity as well as his ability in arms.

It is possible that Goronwy's name appears in a list of witnesses to a contract of Llywelyn the Great as early as 1222. Thus it is likely that he had served as a court official together with his father before succeeding him as seneschal of Gwynedd on his death in 1246, or in the years between 1222 and 1258. A single source tells us that another son of Ednyfed, Gruffudd, was seneschal of Gwynedd from 1246 to 1256. Thus there is some doubt about the succession in that period.

It is known with certainty that he was a witness to documents relating to Gwynedd between 1258 and 1268, under Llywelyn ap Gruffudd. As seneschal, he led a powerful force together with Maredudd ap Rhys, Rhys Fychan, and Maredudd ab Owain of Deheubarth (blood relations to Goronwy) against the Normans of Gwent and the forces of the king of England there in March 1263. The last reference to him in official documents is as an arbitrator between Llywelyn ap Gruffudd and Gilbert de Clare after a raid by Llywelyn on Morgannwg; it is dated 27 September 1268.

Goronwy had land from his father in Anglesey, Arllechwedd and Ceredigion.

Goronwy died on St Luke's Eve, 17 October 1268, according to the Brut y Tywysogion:

"The following year Goronw son of Ednyfed, seneschal to the prince, died on the eve of St Luke the Evangelist, a man excellent in arms, generous with gifts, wise in counsel, loyal in deeds, and pleasant in words."

The bard Y Prydydd Bychan composed an elegy to him. The text is very incomplete and adds very little to our knowledge of him. Another bard, Bleddyn Fardd, composed another elegy to him, which refers to the raid on Gwent and the losses which followed. His death so soon after the hostilities in Gwent suggests that he was wounded there, but there is no proof of this.

== Legacy ==
Goronwy began a lineage which came to include kings and queens of England. The name of his son Tudur Hen became the family surname. A second Tudur ap Goronwy was knighted by King Edward III of England; His name was passed down two further generations to Owain ap Maredudd ap Tudur, who anglicised it to become Owen Tudor. Owen was the grandfather of Henry Tudor, who became King Henry VII of England and founded the royal House of Tudor.
