= Llanfaes Friary =

Remains of a Franciscan friary in north Wales

Llanfaes Franciscan Friary
- Brodordy Llan-faes
- Location within Anglesey

Monastery information
- Order: Order of Friars Minor
- Established: 1237
- Disestablished: 1538
- Diocese: Bangor

People
- Founder: Llywelyn ab Iorwerth
- Important associated figures: Joan, Lady of Wales, Eleanor de Montfort

Architecture
- Heritage designation: Scheduled monument (AN134)

Site
- Location: Nr Beaumaris, Anglesey, Wales
- Coordinates: 53.2748°N 4.0873°W
- Grid reference: SH6091677341
- Visible remains: None

Llanfaes Friary was a Franciscan friary in the now vanished medieval town of Llanfaes, close to what is now Beaumaris, in south east Anglesey, Wales. It was founded around 1237 in memory of Joan, wife of Llywelyn ab Iorwerth. The Friary survived the depopulation of the town, but was dissolved in 1538 and most of the buildings dismantled soon afterwards. The land became an estate on which, in 1623, Rowland Whyte built a house which he called Friars. It became one of the many properties of the Bulkeley family, and was substantially rebuilt in 1866. By the 20th century the house and grounds were owned by James Hartley Burton. In 1939 they were requisitioned for wartime use, adapting and repairing flying boats, by Saunders-Roe, who continued after the war with a wide variety of light engineering activities. The industrial uses finally came to an end in the late 1990s. An archaeological dig on the site in 1991 identified substantial buried remains of the friary church and other monastic buildings. The site is a Scheduled monument.

== The Maedref of Llanfaes ==
The medieval settlement of Llanfaes is now represented only by St Catherine's Church, and even that is a product of 19th century rebuilding. However, it is the residual survivor of a thriving town which by the 12th century was controlling 70% of the trade of the whole of Gwynedd. By the 900s it was the main town (Maerdref) and Royal Court (Llys) of the commote of Dindaethwy which covered the southeast quarter of Anglesey. Control of the ferry crossing gave Llanfaes its wealth and prestige, and by the early 13th century it was a busy commercial town, probably centred around the Church. It was into this urbanised location that the Franciscan Friary was established. However, by the end of the 13th century Edward I had defeated Llywelyn ap Gruffudd and put down the rebellion of Madog ap Llywelyn, and to press home his conquest, began a new castle and walled town at Beaumaris. The new town took control of the ferry crossing, and to ensure Llanfaes did not compete commercially with the new maerdref of Beaumaris, in 1303 the Llanfaes burgesses were forcibly resettled on the other side of Anglesey, at another new township, Newborough. Apart from the Church and the Friary, little seems to have survived this determined depopulation, such that even the location of the town is now uncertain.

== Foundation ==
The first Franciscans arrived in Britain in 1224 as part of a missionary expansion of this new order of friars living a life of poverty and preaching. Unlike many earlier monasteries that had sought rural seclusion, the Franciscans needed and embraced urban locations, both to provide them with the daily charitable giving needed by a mendicant existence, and to be amongst the people they wished to teach and serve. All the earliest British foundations were small, often redundant or decayed premises, and there was an active resistance to prestige or permanence in their buildings. However this very rejection of the trappings of success was greeted with enthusiasm across England and Wales and by 1240 at least 29 houses had become established.

The Friary at Llanfaes was founded about 1237 AD, just as this early stress on poverty was beginning to be replaced by an acceptance of larger, well-funded premises, from donors eager to be associated with this lively new expression of Christian faith. In this case it would appear that Llywelyn ab Iorwerth, Prince of Gwynedd and Wales, established the friary in memory of his wife Joan, Lady of Wales, who died in 1237 at their palace in Abergwyngregyn. The friary was consecrated in 1240, prior to Llywelyn's death, and Joan's original burial place was within a consecrated enclosure which remained within the friary precincts after it was constructed.

As a result of these events, the friary became associated with female members of the royal family of Gwynedd, and in 1282 it was the burial place of Eleanor de Montfort, Princess of Wales. It was also the favoured burial site of local Anglesey nobility.

== Decline ==
Some damage to the friary occurred in 1295, during the revolt of Madoc ap Llywelyn. It was further embroiled in the 1401 rebellion of Owain Glyndŵr, causing sufficient damage that the occupants were forced to vacate it for several years. It was restored in 1414 with the support of King Henry V. Despite the disappearance of its town, the monastery was at least sustainable, and was still a going concern at the Dissolution of the Monasteries.

== Dissolution ==
The friary was dissolved in 1538 by Henry VIII, and an inventory at that time indicates that, as well as the church, vestry, accommodation and refectory buildings, a substantial agricultural holding was in place. It lists a brew-house with a furnace and brewing vat, a yard with carts, a cheese store, kitchen, hall with table and trestles and a store house, agricultural produce, grain, cattle and sheep. The buildings were gradually demolished from 1539 onwards, to provide building material in Beaumaris. The precinct boundary wall was still visible to John Speed in 1610, and the Friary church remained until the mid-nineteenth century, in use as a barn. There are few surviving traces, other than a few medieval floor tiles. Some of these have images of oak leaves and acorns; it has been suggested that this relates to the name "Llanfaes", derived from "mes", a Welsh word for acorns. The friary's lands were initially acquired by the Bulkeley family. They then passed to the Wynne (Welsh for "White") family and, in 1623, Rowland Whyte built a house there.

An empty stone coffin now to be found in St Mary's and St Nicholas's Church, Beaumaris, has long been considered to be that of Joan. The panel above the coffin is inscribed: "This plain sarcophagus, (once dignified as having contained the remains of Joan, daughter of King John, and consort of Llewelyn ap Iowerth, Prince of North Wales, who died in the year 1237), having been conveyed from the Friary of Llanfaes, and alas, used for many years as a horsewatering trough, was rescued from such an indignity and placed here for preservation as well as to excite serious meditation on the transitory nature of all sublunary distinctions. By Thomas James Warren Bulkeley, Viscount Bulkeley, Oct 1808"

More recently, experts have reviewed the carved coffin lid, which does not appear to be associated with the coffin itself. It has been suggested that the style of the carved image is not in keeping the 1230s when Joan died, although the presence of a coronet suggests a member of the royal family. Eleanor de Montfort is considered by many to be the most likely alternative.

== Henllys and Fryars ==
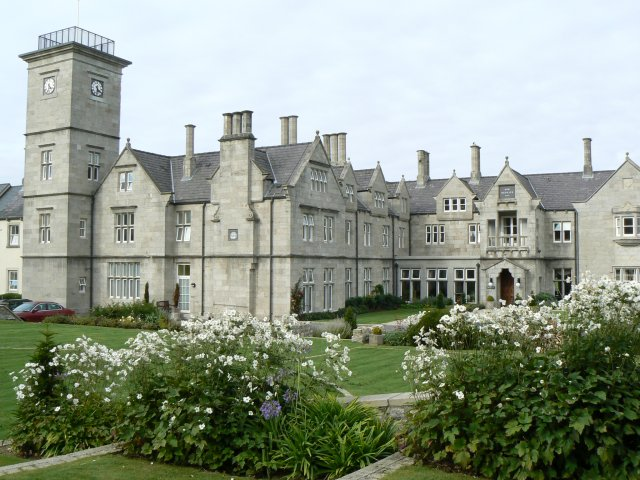
Henllys, the ancient Llys and mansion site last rebuilt in the 1850s by the Hampton family

Near to Llanfaes was Henllys, in early medieval times the principle seat of one of the 15 tribes of North Wales. When Llanfaes was de-populated at the start of the 14th century, Henllys survived as a residence of note, and after 1460 it was granted to William Hampton, by then the Deputy Governor of Beaumaris Castle. The name Henllys means the 'old llys', acknowledging its former status as a royal court, and is first recorded in 1584. The Hamptons became the principle family of the locality and the family retained Henllys, expanding their land holdings such that by 1630 they held most of the former township of Llanfaes, and continued to do so until the mid-20th century. Henllys was rebuilt and expanded over the centuries, most recently in the 1850s. At the outbreak of the second world war it was requisitioned for wartime use to house engineering workers at the Fryars site. After the war Henllys was owned by a Franciscan order during the 1950s, before becoming a hotel and in 2003 became a part of the Holiday Property Bond.

At the same time as the Hamptons were expanding their landholdings, the Bulkeleys were the principle Beaumaris family. At the dissolution of the Friary in 1539, it was the Bulkeleys who took the lease on the site, and plundered its building stone for use in Beaumaris. The next leaseholder, from 1563, was Ellis Wynne (White), and his descendant, Rowland Whyte built a house in 1623, which he named Friars. The Bulkeley family, with their huge mansion at nearby Baron Hill re-took possession of Friars from the Whytes and thus the two major landholders of the area, the Hamptons and Bulkeleys, divided Llanfaes between them. In 1866 Friars (which came to be spelled Fryars) was rebuilt and by the start of the 20th century Fryars had been bought by James Hartley Burton, JP, DL, originally from Birkdale, Lancashire (grandson of James Burton). They had a son (John Prescott Burton), a daughter (Frances Ellen May Burton) and triplets, two boys (Alfred and Richard Burton) and a girl (Mary Conway Burton). The two sons, Alfred and Richard, were both killed in World War I and are recorded on the Beaumaris war memorial. Mary Burton was elected mayor of Beaumaris in 1953, 1954, 1955 and 1956 and also High Sheriff of Anglesey.

== Industrial uses of the site ==
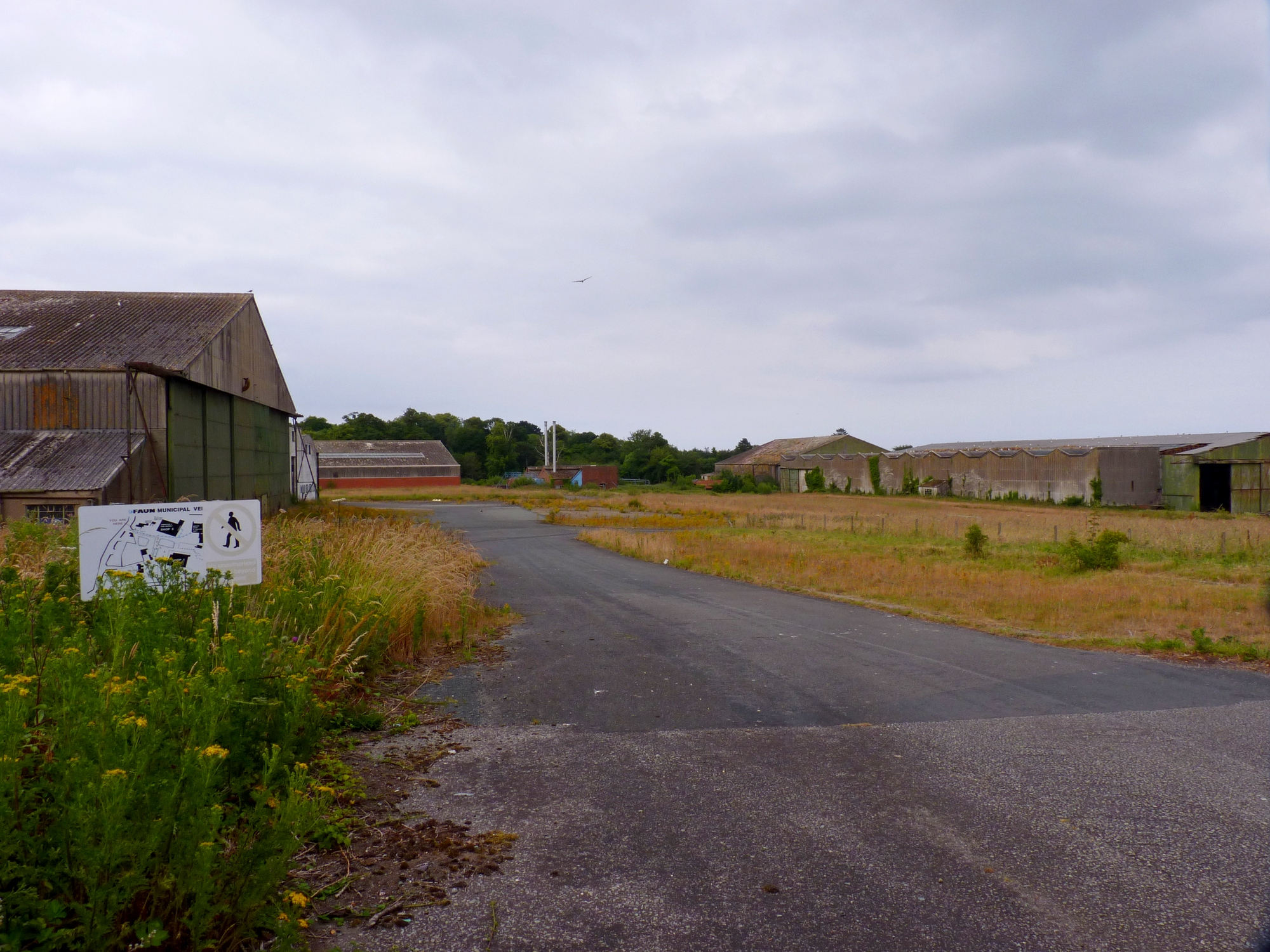
Northern end of the friary site, showing now derelict engineering sheds.

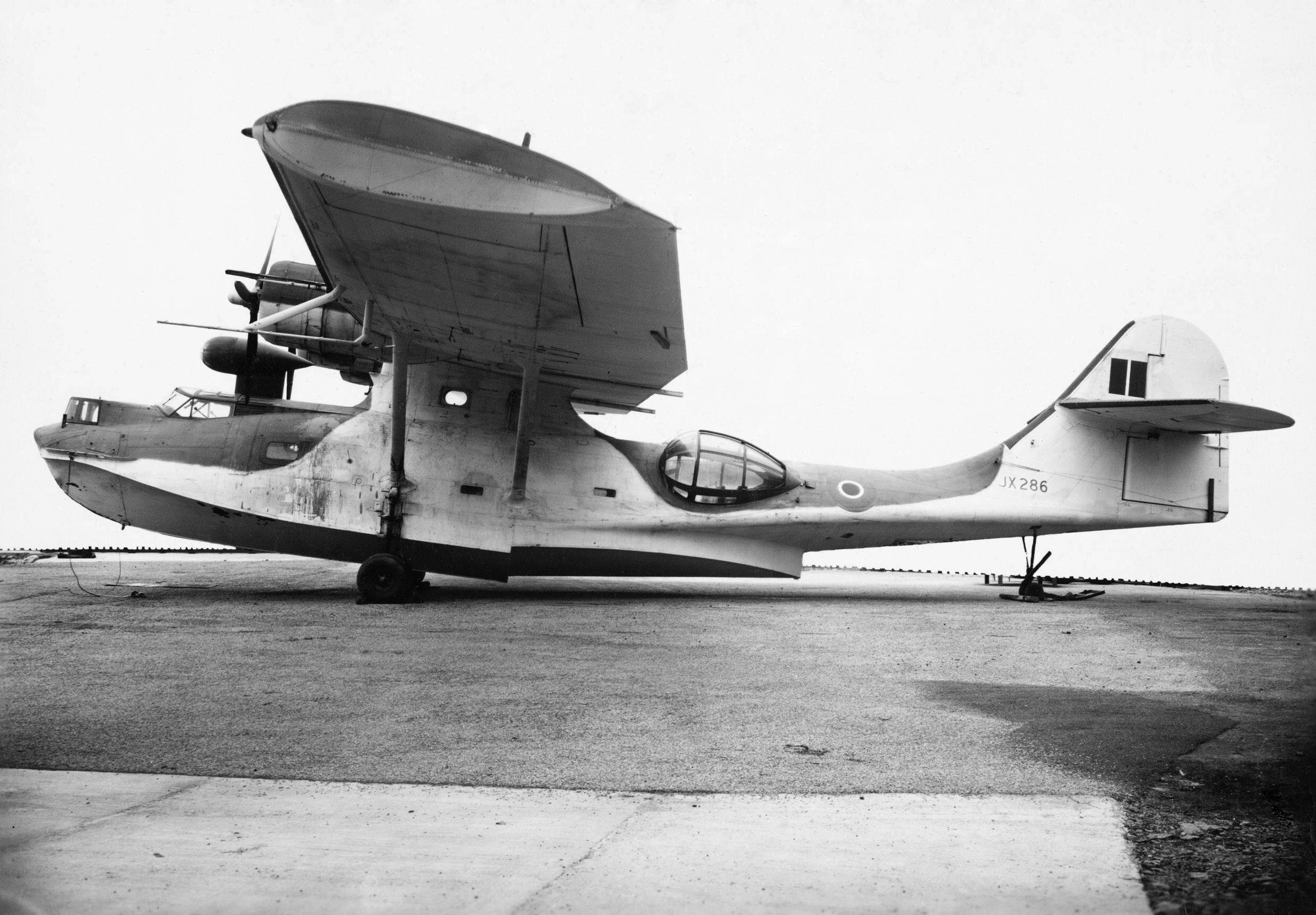
Catalina IVB 205 Sqn RAF, on the ground at Saunders-Roe's Friars site. The background was blanked out by a wartime censor to avoid showing the site details.

In 1939, Fryars House and 50 acres of the estate were requisitioned from the Burton family for use in the war effort. The site was allocated to Saunders-Roe, who used it for modifying American and Canadian built Catalina flying boats. Over four years 399 Catalinas received a wide range of adaptations to fit in with RAF needs, including .303 British version Browning machine guns, British type bomb-racks and RAF radio equipment. They also installed highly secret Air-to-Surface Vessel radar (ASV) and from 1942, Leigh lights. German U-boats had to spend time on the surface at night, while they re-charged their batteries. The combination of radar and the high powered searchlights enabled the planes to find and attack a U-boat before it could dive.

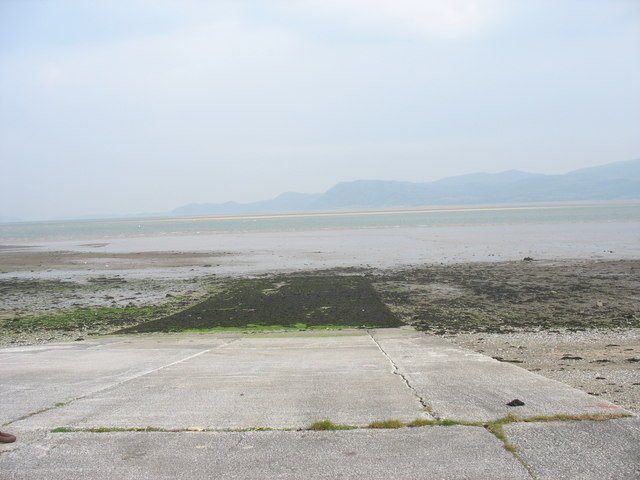
The Fryars Slipway on the foreshore of Fryars Bay

At Llanfaes, a long slipway was built across the road and across the foreshore to Fryars Bay. The flying boats were able to utilise the large area of deep water along the east end of the Menai Straits. The Catalinas were manufactured in USA and Canada, and were initially sent over on cargo ships, but from November 1942 they were able to be flown over direct from either Bermuda or CFB Goose Bay, Canada. One of the survivals from this time is a large concrete turning circle, just south of Fryars House, used when setting aircraft compasses. After the war the factory diversified into a wide range of engineering tasks. Some aircraft activity continued, such as trialing floats for Auster light aircraft, and a pioneering use of aluminium in the manufacture of motor torpedo boats P1602, Dark-class fast patrol boats, Bras d'Or (R-103) Hydrofoils and Airborne lifeboats. They also produced a wide variety of civilian and military land based craft, such as the coachwork for buses. 620 of these buses were exported to Cuba in the 1950s. At its height over 2,000 people worked at the site. Fryars House became the offices. In the war, workers were housed in nearby Henllys Hall, Plas Rhianfa (now Chateau Rhianfa Hotel and in prefabricated housing. This was gradually replaced by permanent houses such that a new village of Llanfaes has grown up north of the factory site.

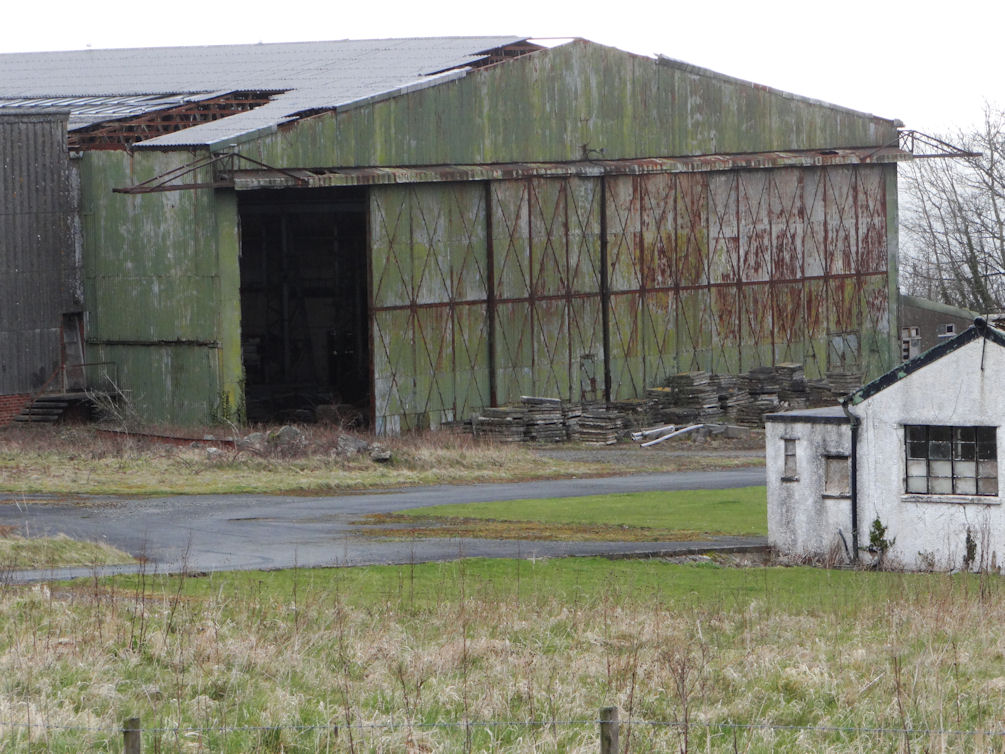
Saunders Roe Friars Site in 2013

In 1968 the Llanfaes SARO site, along with an engineering works in Llangefni were merged as part of the Cammell Laird shipbuilding firm, to become Laird (Anglesey). By the 1990s this had become owned by Faun Group, who in 1997 opened a new works in Llangefni and the decaying wartime hangars and buildings finally fell into disuse. Aluminium construction still remains the core activity of the firm at Llangefni, but the Llanfaes site is no longer in use.

== Archaeological investigation ==
A proposal to construct sewage treatment works within the area of the scheduled monument required a thorough archaeological investigation, which was carried out by Gwynedd Archaeological Trust in the summer of 1991, to establish the nature and extent of any buried features. The sewage works were subsequently built in the southern corner of the site. The 1991 excavations opened a series of trenches in some of the more accessible parts of what had become an area of dense tree cover. The main existing structure in the area is the large concrete turning circle from the 1940s flying boat activities. The Friary Church itself stood some 20 metres north of the circle, and did not form part of the study area. Two trenches close to the circle proved particularly rich in finds relating to the friary graveyard and boundary wall. The largest of these, Trench E, on the down-slope (east) side of the circle, revealed seven phases of activity.

1. Graves from an early period of the friary's history. These were cut alongside a boundary wall and drain of broadly the same date.
2. Graves on a slightly different alignment were dug at a later period.
3. A second wall, with further graves, were cut through the earlier graves, which by then must have been unmarked and forgotten.
4. Two grave holes with no contents. This suggests these were disinterred and relocated when the friary was dissolved in 1538. (Earlier burials were left in situ.)
5. A cobbled surface. This was probably laid during construction of the 1623 'Friars House'
6. An accumulation of 0.25 metres (9.8 in) of clay soil, had occurred, whilst a trackway running north-south remained as a depression feature.
7. The sunken track was filled in, the site levelled up with clay and gravel, and finally tarmacked, all during the 20th century.

Other trenches had much less archaeology. The west (up-slope) side of the circle had been cut down to the natural to give a level area for the circle, so that archaeology there had been lost. The trenches south of the circle revealed nothing of interest apart from the trackway/road, and so that area was deemed permissible for the sewage treatment works to be built.

== See also ==
- List of Scheduled Monuments in Anglesey
- Dindaethwy (medieval commote)
