= Dafydd ab Einion Fychan =

Welsh aristocrat and statesman (died 1282)

Distain of Gwynedd
- In office c.1281–1282
- Monarch: Llywelyn ap Gruffudd
- Preceded by: Tudur ab Ednyfed Fychan
- Succeeded by: Position abolished

Personal details
- Died: 1282
- Parents: Einion Fychan (father); Angharad ferch Ednfyed (mother)

Dafydd ab Einion Fychan (died 1282) was a Welsh aristocrat who served as the last distain of Gwynedd. He was the last holder of this position, and was killed alongside Llywelyn ap Gruffudd in the campaign into South Wales in late 1282.

== Bibliography ==
- Stephenson, David (2014) [1984]. Political Power in Medieval Gwynedd: Governance and the Welsh Princes. Studies in Welsh History (2nd ed.). Cardiff: University of Wales Press. ISBN 9781783160044. IA politicalpowerin0000step.
