= Sir Gruffudd Llwyd =

Welsh nobleman and administrator (died 1335)

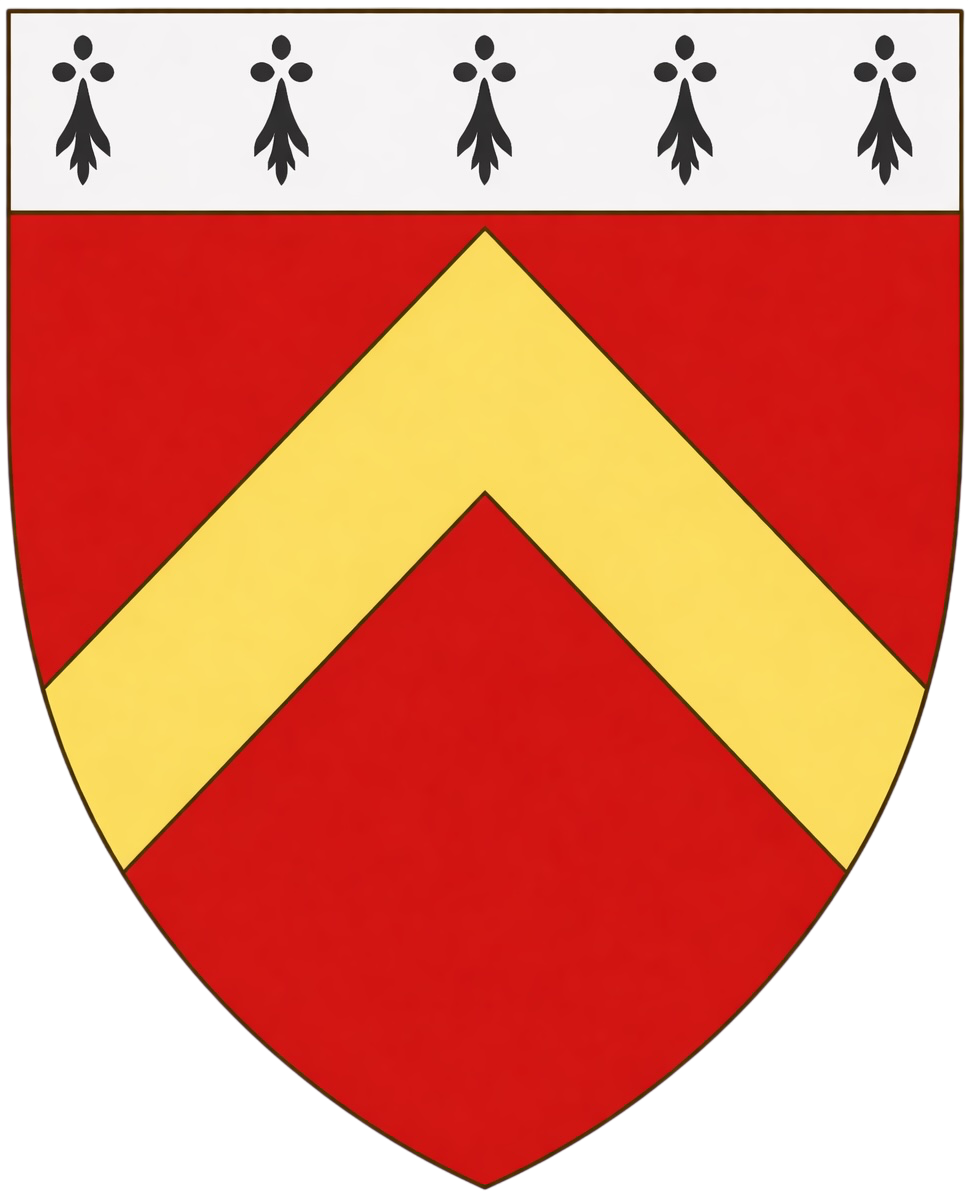
- Attributed arms of Sir Gruffudd Llwyd

Personal details
- Died: c. 1355
- Spouse: Gwenllïant ferch Cynan
- Children: Ieuan ap Gruffudd Llwyd
- Parents: Rhys ap Gruffudd (father); Margaret le Strange (mother)

Sir Gruffudd Llywd ap Rhys (died 1335) was a Welsh nobleman notable for his involvement in quashing Roger Mortimer's 1322 revolt against King Edward II. Throughout his life until his death in 1335, Llwyd held high-ranking positions in Welsh society, with Lordships in Tregarnedd and Dinorwig and serving as Sheriff of Caernarfonshire, Anglesey and Merionethshire. Son of loyalist Rhys ap Gruffyd (died 1284), Gruffyd Llwyd was a supporter of King Edward I and King Edward II, helping to enforce conformity to English rule along the Welsh Marches. Historical folklore has often mistakenly portrayed Llwyd as a ‘Welsh Rebel’ who challenged King Edward II, though this has been strongly disputed by historians.

== Family background ==
Born in the late 13th century, Gruffudd Llwyd was the son of Rhys ap Gruffudd and the great-grandson of Ednyfed Fychan. His father and uncle both supported King Edward I's conquest of Wales between 1282 and 1284, and likely passed their loyalist ideals onto him. Gruffudd Llwyd inherited the family's land and titles in North Wales upon his father's death in 1284, which was in turn passed on to Llwyd's only son Ieuan in 1335. In addition to their son, he and his wife Gwenllian had seven daughters.

== Royal service ==
Llwyd was exposed to royal service from a young age, joining Queen Eleanor's household in his youth, and would continue to support to the English monarchy for the remainder of his life. He held various land titles in Wales including the Lordships of Tregarnedd (Anglesey) and Dinorwig (Caernarfon), in addition to land in the Rhos region he inherited from his father. Llwyd also served the King as High Sheriff of Caernarfonshire, Anglesey, and Merionethshire intermittently between 1301 and 1327. He was knighted, presumably in 1301. Between 1297 and 1314 Gruffudd Llwyd was responsible for raising troops in the north Wales region for military service, an honoured role entrusted upon him by the King. Interestingly, he was imprisoned twice during his lifetime, first by King Edward I in 1295 and then by King Edward III in 1327. Though the reason for the first imprisonment is unknown, the latter was likely due to his close position to the late King Edward II.

=== Revolt of 1322 ===
Gruffudd Llwyd was instrumental in the suppressing of Roger Mortimer's 1322 Revolt against King Edward II. In response to the Marcher lords' insurgence along the border regions, Llwyd was ordered by the King to raise loyalist troops. Using these troops Llwyd re-captured the occupied a number of castles including Holt and Chirk, and successfully quashed the opposing anti-monarchist faction.

== Disputed myth ==
The historical narrative surrounding Gruffudd Llwyd is occasionally contradictory, with some myths and earlier biographies incorrectly portraying him as a Welsh rebel who fought against King Edward II. In this narrative, Llwyd grew frustrated with oppression by the English, joining the 1322 Revolt against the Crown and consequently being locked in Rhuddlan Castle. According to historian J. G. Edwards, the warping of the historical truth stemmed from William Wynne's edited version of Humphrey Llwyd's History of Cambria (1584) which added the traditional Gruffudd Llwyd folklore. Edwards strongly asserts that this traditional narrative is false as a wealth of evidence proves that Llwyd remained a trusted supporter of the monarchy.
