= Tudur ab Ednyfed Fychan =

Welsh aristocrat and statesman (died c. 1281)

Distain of Gwynedd
- In office c.1268 – c. 1281
- Monarch: Llywelyn ap Gruffudd
- Preceded by: Goronwy ab Ednyfed Fychan
- Succeeded by: Dafydd ab Einion Fychan

Personal details
- Died: c. 1281
- Parents: Ednyfed Fychan (father); Tangwystl ferch Llywarch (mother)

Tudur ab Ednyfed Fychan (died c. 1281) was a Welsh aristocrat who served as the Seneschal of Gwynedd.

Tudur was the eldest son of Ednyfed Fychan ap Cynwrig. He married Adelicia ferch Riccert, their child was Heilyn ap Tudur. Tudur is mentioned in King Henry III's Patent rolls, dated 30 July 1248:

Grant to Tuder son of Edynaueth of 10l. a year at the exchequer of Chester of Easter, for his maintenance in the king's service, until the king provide for him otherwise.
