= Seneschal =

Court position appointed by a monarch

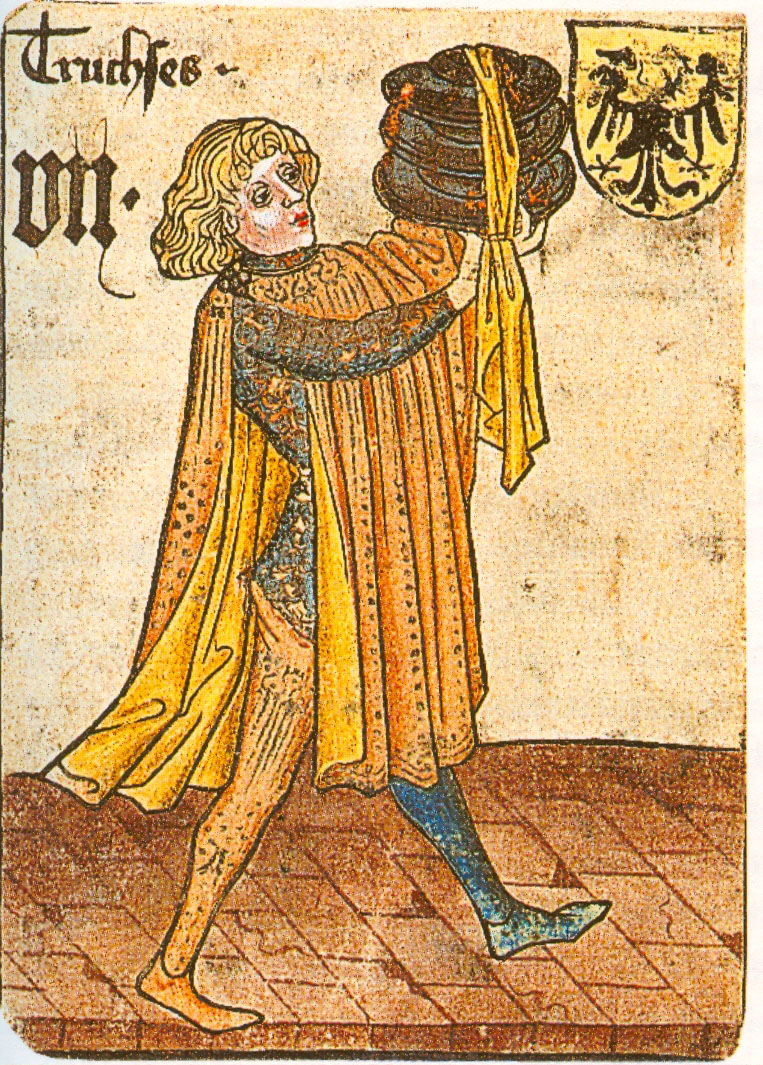
Seneschal from the Holy Roman Empire

A seneschal (/ˈsɛnəʃəl/ SEN-ə-shəl) is most commonly a senior position filled by a court appointment within a royal, ducal, or noble household during the Middle Ages and early Modern period – historically a steward or majordomo of a medieval great house. In a medieval royal household, a seneschal was in charge of domestic arrangements and the administration of servants, which, in the medieval period particularly, meant the seneschal might oversee hundreds of laborers, servants and their associated responsibilities, and have a great deal of power in the community, at a time when much of the local economy was often based on the wealth and responsibilities of such a household.

A more specific type, which concerns the late medieval and early modern nation of France, of seneschal (French: sénéchal) was also a royal officer in charge of justice and control of the administration of certain southern provinces called seneschalties, holding a role equivalent to a northern French bailiff (bailli).

In the United Kingdom the modern seneschal is primarily an ecclesiastical position, a cathedral official.

== Origin ==
The Medieval Latin discifer (dish-bearer) was an officer in the household of later Anglo-Saxon kings, and it is sometimes translated by historians as seneschal, although the term was not used in England before the Norman Conquest.

The term, first attested in 1350–1400, was borrowed from Anglo-Norman seneschal "steward", from Old Dutch *siniscalc "senior retainer" (attested in Latin siniscalcus (692 AD), Old High German senescalh), a compound of *sini- (cf. Gothic sineigs "old", sinista "oldest") and scalc "servant", ultimately a calque of Late Latin senior scholaris "senior guard".

The scholae in the late Roman Empire referred to the imperial guard, divided into senior (seniores) and junior (juniores) units. The captain of the guard was known as comes scholarum. When Germanic tribes took over the Empire, the scholae were merged or replaced with the Germanic king's warband (cf. Vulgar Latin *dructis, OHG truht, Old English dryht) whose members also had duties in their lord's household like a royal retinue. The king's chief warbandman and retainer (cf. Old Saxon druhting, OHG truhting, truhtigomo OE dryhtguma, dryhtealdor), from the 5th century on, personally attended on the king, as specifically stated in the Codex Theodosianus of 413 (Cod. Theod. VI. 13. 1; known as comes scholae). The warband, once sedentary, became first the king's royal household, and then his great officers of state, and in both cases the seneschal is synonymous with steward.

== Medieval Europe ==
=== France ===
In late medieval and early modern France, the seneschal was originally a royal steward overseeing the entire country but developed into an agent of the crown charged with administration of a seneschalty (French: sénéchaussée), one of the districts of the crown lands in Gascony, Aquitaine, Languedoc and Normandy. Hallam states that the first seneschals to govern in this manner did so by an 1190 edict of Philip II. The seneschals also served as the chief justice of the royal courts of appeal in their areas and were occasionally seconded by vice-seneschals.

The equivalent post throughout most of northern France was the bailiff (bailli), who oversaw a bailiwick (bailliage).

- William de Gometz was Seneschal of France c. AD 1000.
- Osbern the Steward was seneschal to two dukes of Normandy.

Under rulers of England

- Bertram de Criol, then member of the King's Council, Lord Warden of the Cinque Ports, Constable of Dover Castle, and Keeper of the Archbishopric of Canterbury, and shortly to become Constable of the Tower of London, is referred to as "our Seneschal" in Letters of King Henry III of December 1239.
- Sir William Felton, an English knight, was appointed seneschal of Poitou in 1360.
- Sir Thomas Felton, an English knight, was appointed seneschal of Aquitaine in 1362 and seneschal of Bordeaux in 1372.
- Sir John Chandos, an English knight, was appointed seneschal of Poitou in 1369.

=== Anglo-Saxon England ===
In Anglo-Saxon England dish-bearers (in Medieval Latin discifer or dapifer) were nobles who served at royal feasts. The term is often translated by historians as "seneschal".

=== Kingdom of Sicily ===
In the Kingdom of Sicily, the figure of the Grand Seneschal was introduced by Roger II: subordinate to the Grand Constable, he was one of the seven great officers of the kingdom, with the task of managing the royal properties and providing for the food of the king and his court. The office survived in the Angevin and Aragonese eras. Giovanni Pontano defined the Grand Seneschal as Mestre de camp; Scipione Ammirato called him "Majordomo of the Royal House," "the supreme officer in charge of the table." For a sign, in addition to those of his own house, he had a unicorn cup.

=== Holy Roman Empire ===
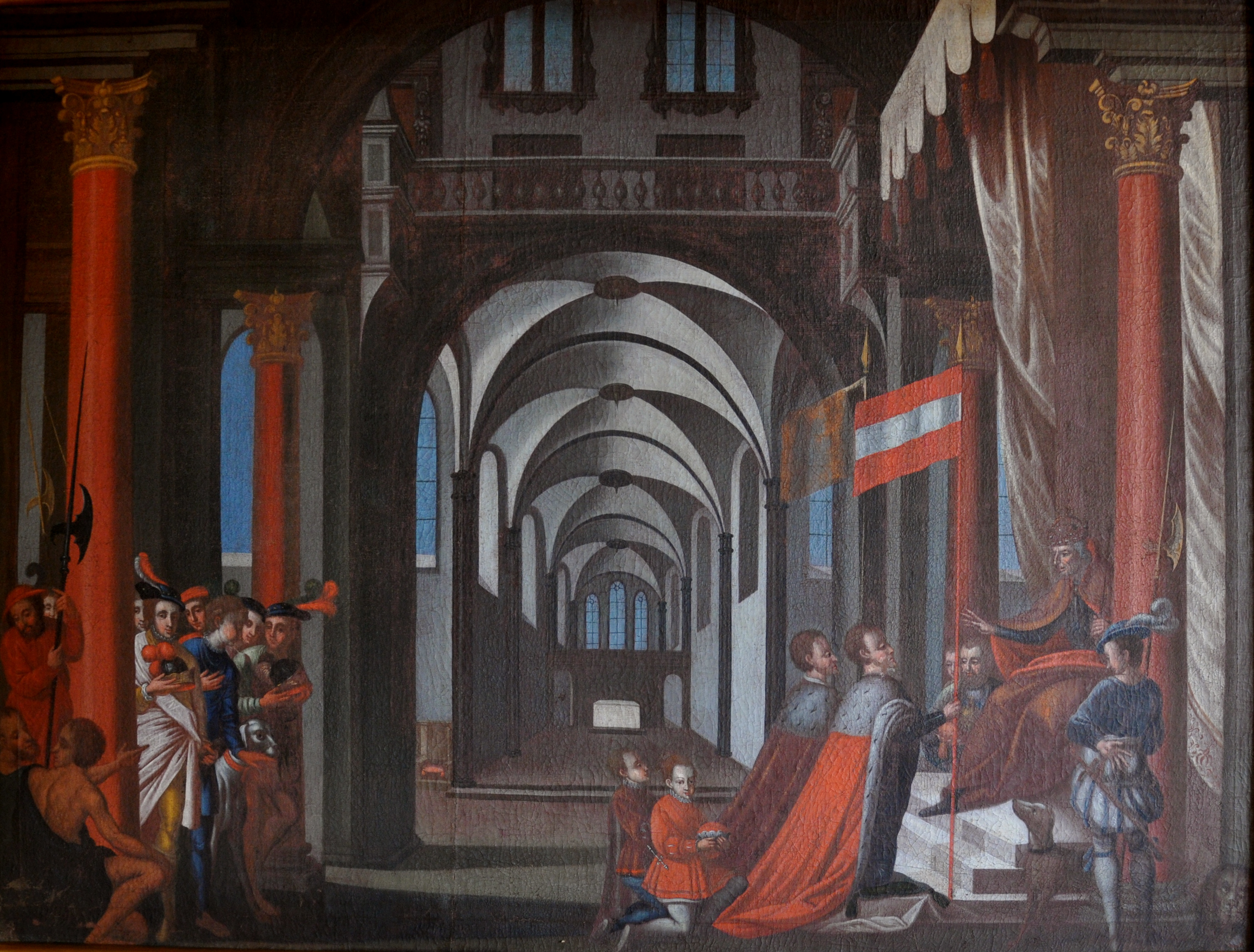
Awarding of the office of Truchsess to the House of Waldburg

Truchsess was a court office in medieval court society for the supreme overseer of the princely table in the Holy Roman Empire, Seneschal is the equivalent to the office of Truchsess. The term derives from Old High German truhtsâzo (Latin dapifer, French écuyer de cuisine, English steward, Hungarian asztalnok, Polish stolnik, Russian стольник, Dutch drossaard), Low German Drost(e). The office of Truchsess was one of the highest court offices, along with Hofmarschall, Schenk, and Kämmerer. References date back to the 10th century. The term is composed of druhti "troop"—primarily referring to the entourage of a prince—respectively truht or druht "to provide allegiance" and säze "to sit" (cf. Sasse, as in Freisasse, Landsasse, and Hintersasse) and thus means "someone who sits in the retinue" or—possibly originally—"who leads the retinue".

=== Gwynedd ===
The title of Seneschal was used in the Kingdom of Gwynedd during the medieval ages. Documented in the 12th century were the Stewards (Seneschal) of King Owain Gwynedd, those being Hwfa ap Cynddelw and Llywarch ap Bran, both of the Fifteen Tribes of Wales. Then merely a century later, the role was occupied by Ednyfed Fychan (c. 1200s), and later on his sons Sir Tudur ap Ednyfed Fychan and Goronwy ab Ednyfed also became Seneschals to the Kings of Gwynedd. Fychan's family became known as the Tudors of Penmynydd.

=== Isle of Man ===
The Seneschal of Tynwald is an administrative role to the Parliament of the Isle of Man, part of the staff of the Clerk of Tynwald’s Office. The Seneschal role was formed in 2006 and is part of the Tynwald Corporate Services Office. The Seneschal manages the Messengers and Gardyn Coadee.

=== Sark ===
The Seneschal of Sark presides over the Court of the Seneschal, which hears civil and some criminal cases.

=== Papacy ===
Formerly, officers known as Seneschal Dapifers were involved in the ceremony of the papal conclave during the election of a new Pope, to see to mealtimes for the cardinal electors while ensuring secrecy. Cardinals regularly had meals sent in from their homes with much pageantry accompanying the conveyance of food:

Towards noon each day, the Cardinal's gentlemen proceeded to his house and conveyed his dinner to the Vatican in a state coach. They were accompanied by an officer, known as the Seneschal Dapifer, who was charged with the very important duty of seeing that the Cardinal's food was not poisoned! ... The dishes were enclosed in hampers or tin boxes, covered with green or violet drapery, and ... were carried in state through the entrance halls, preceded by the mace of the Cardinal. The Seneschal Dapifer, bearing a serviette on his shoulder, preceded the dishes.... Before the Cardinal received his dinner, each dish underwent a careful inspection by the prelates on guard, in order that no letter should be concealed in it.

These ceremonies have not been observed since the nineteenth century.

In the Knights Templar, seneschal was the title used by the second-in-command of the Order after the Grand Master.

== See also ==
- Grand maître de France – the Great Officer of the Crown of France in charge of the Royal Household (the "Maison du Roi")
- Marshal
- Majordomo
- Sheriff, another Germanic-rooted title of command over a jurisdiction, derived from "shire" and "reeve".
- Sir Kay, a legendary seneschal in the court of King Arthur.
- Barons Dunboyne, Seneschal of Tipperary, Ireland.
- Kingdom of Alba Seneschals, Scottish Steward
