= Much Hadham =

Village in England

Coordinates: 51.854°N 0.072°E

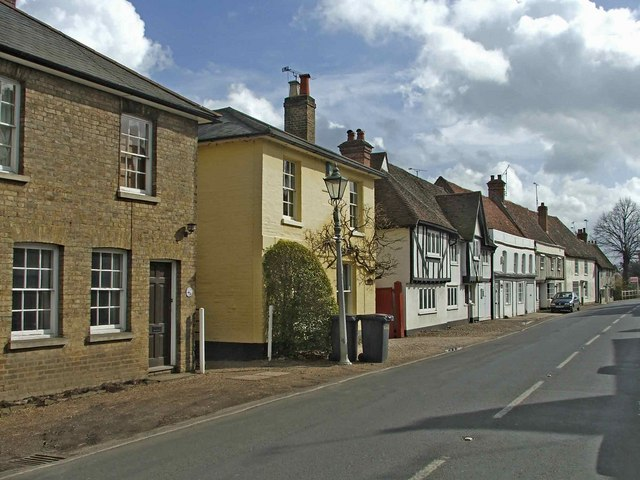
- View along High Street

- Location within Hertfordshire
- Population: 2,195 (Parish, 2021)
- OS grid reference: TL426208
- Civil parish: Much Hadham
- District: East Hertfordshire
- Shire county: Hertfordshire
- Region: East
- Country: England
- Sovereign state: United Kingdom
- Post town: Much Hadham
- Postcode district: SG10
- Dialling code: 01279
- Police: Hertfordshire
- Fire: Hertfordshire
- Ambulance: East of England
- UK Parliament: Hertford and Stortford

Much Hadham, historically also known as Great Hadham, is a village and civil parish in the East Hertfordshire district of Hertfordshire, England. It lies 4 miles (6 km) south-west of Bishop's Stortford and 5 miles (8 km) north-east of Ware. As well as the village itself, the parish covers surrounding rural areas, including the hamlets of Green Tye, Hadham Cross, and Perry Green. At the 2021 census, the parish had a population of 2,195.

== History ==
Evidence of occupation in the Roman era has been found in the Much Hadham area, including pottery kilns, and a hoard of Roman coins.

Much Hadham and neighbouring Little Hadham to the north are collectively known as The Hadhams. The Hadhams appear to have comprised a single territory in Saxon times, which may also have included Albury and the three Pelhams of Brent Pelham, Furneux Pelham, and Stocking Pelham to the north. The earliest known recording of the name Hadham dates from a charter of the 950s. The name comes from heath ham, meaning the estate on the heath. The 'Much' comes from the Old English 'mycel', meaning 'great'.

The Domesday Book of 1086 records five estates or manors at a vill listed as Hadam in the Edwinstree hundred of Hertfordshire. The Domesday Book itself does not otherwise distinguish between the Hadham manors by name, but historians have deduced that three of the manors correspond to Much Hadham, and the other two correspond to Little Hadham. It was reported that the largest of the three Much Hadham manors had been owned by the Bishop of London prior to the Norman Conquest of 1066, at which time the other two Much Hadham manors had been in separate ownership, but all three manors had been brought under the Bishop of London's ownership by 1086.

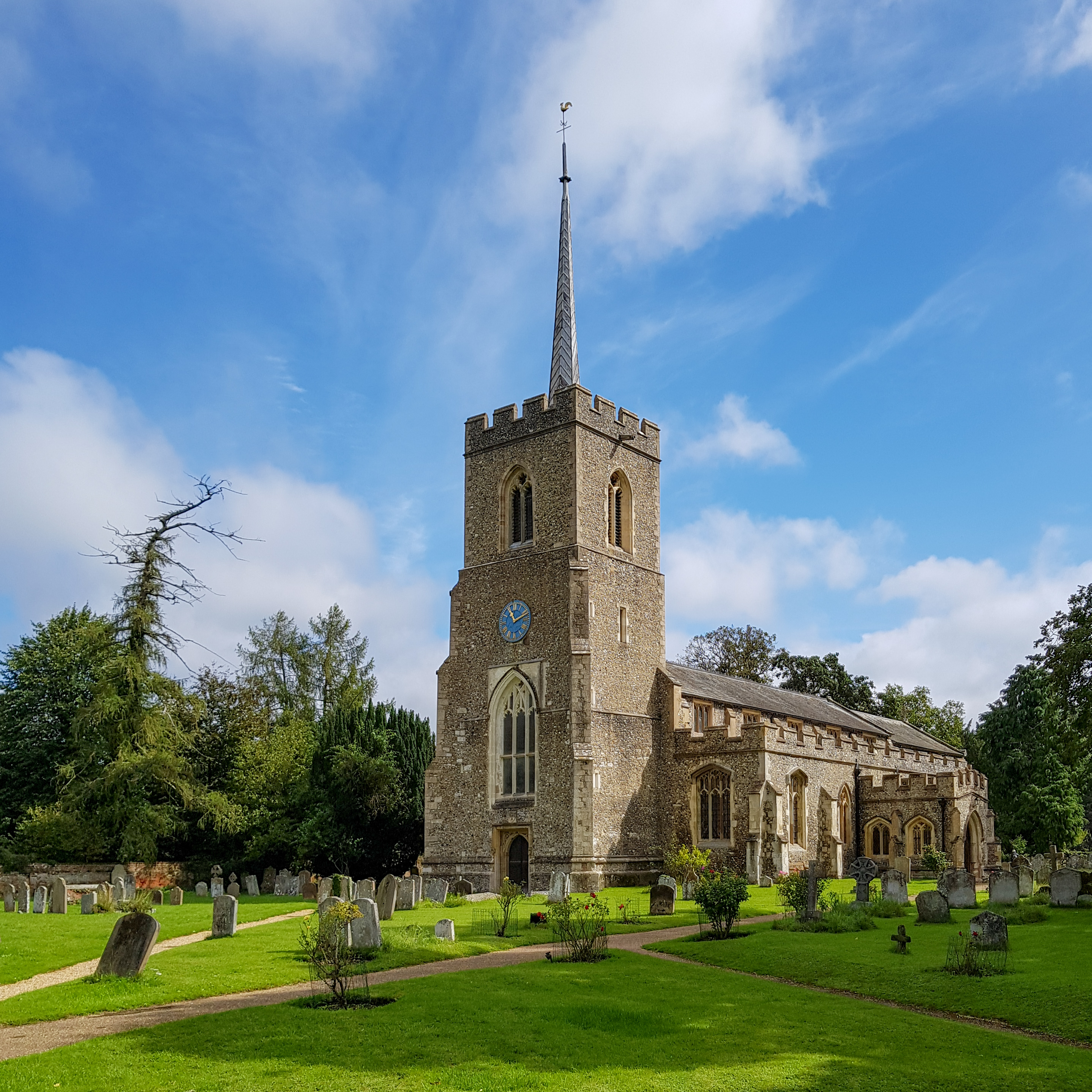
St Andrew's Church

A priest is mentioned at one of the Much Hadham manors in the Domesday Book. The Hadham area became the two parishes of Little Hadham and Much Hadham. Much Hadham's parish church, dedicated to St Andrew, probably dates from the 12th century, although most of the building as seen today was built in the 15th century.

The Bishops of London in their capacity as lords of the manor built Much Hadham Palace to the north of the church. A palace is known to have stood on the site from before the Norman Conquest; the current building dates from the early 16th century. It served as an asylum from 1817 to 1863. The building is now subdivided into private homes.

The Buntingford branch line passed through the parish, opening in 1863. Hadham railway station opened with the railway. It stood at Hadham Cross, towards the southern end of the parish. The line closed in 1965 and was subsequently dismantled. The station site was redeveloped for housing along a road called Millers View.

During the First World War, there was a British Red Cross/Order of St John auxiliary hospital in Much Hadham. Today a plaque on the front of Woodham House commemorates it.

During the Second World War Much Hadham was the site of Prisoner of War camp 69. The camp closed around 1950.

== Geography ==
The village stretches along its mile-and-a-half-long high street (High Street, Tower Hill and Widford Road), which runs along the river Ash. It is situated between Bishop's Stortford and Ware, about 12 kilometres (7.5 mi) from Hertford and about 40 kilometres (25 mi) north of London.

In 1895 the parish was reported to have an area of 4,490 acres (1,817 hectares).

== Landmarks ==
There are two church buildings in Much Hadham, the parish church and a Congregational church. Much Hadham's parish church, built largely between 1225 and 1450, is shared between the St Andrew's Church of England congregation and the Holy Cross Roman Catholic congregation. The entrance to the church is adorned with two sculptures by Henry Moore.

Peter Townsend, a noted Battle of Britain pilot later romantically linked to Princess Margaret, married his first wife, Rosemary Pawle, in St Andrew's in 1941.

The more recent Congregational church dates from 1872.

There are many listed buildings in Much Hadham, including four listed Grade I. These are St Andrew's Parish Church, Much Hadham Hall, Moor Place and the boundary wall at Yewtree Farmhouse at Hadham Cross. The many Grade II* Listed buildings in the parish include The Lordship, The Red House, Yew Tree Farmhouse and Much Hadham Palace, the site of a residence of the Bishops of London.

The Henry Moore Foundation can be found in Perry Green and includes Moore's home. In December 2005 thieves stole a 1970 bronze of a reclining figure from the site, which was melted and sold for scrap metal.

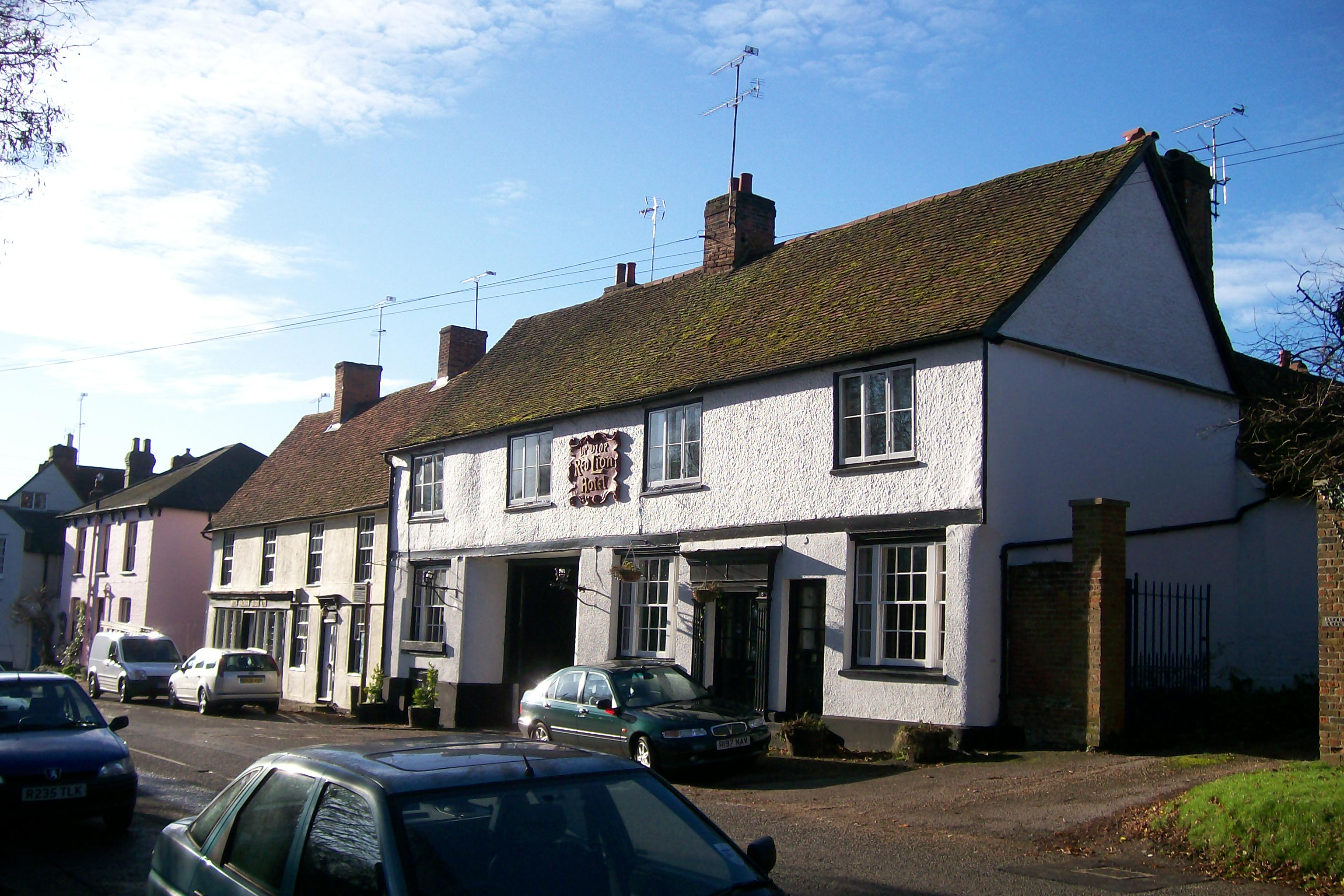
Former Red Lion public house

The Red Lion coaching inn, now converted into private houses, was built in the 15th century. It was a stopping point on the old road from London to Cambridge. Legend has it that the inn is connected to St Andrew's by a tunnel, possibly built during the time of Oliver Cromwell as an escape route for the clergy. This is highly unlikely given the height of the water table.

== Governance ==
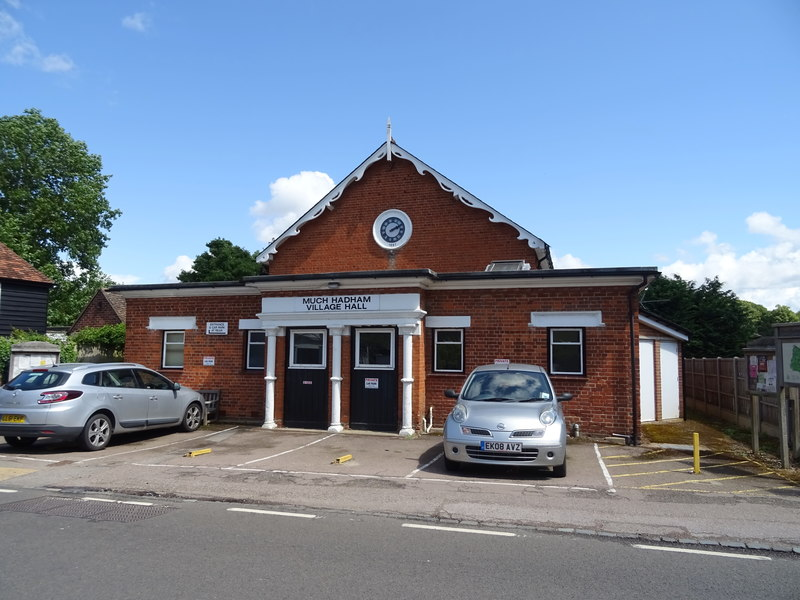
Much Hadham Village Hall

There are three tiers of local government covering Much Hadham, at parish, district, and county level: Much Hadham Parish Council, East Hertfordshire District Council, and Hertfordshire County Council. The parish council generally meets at the Village Hall on High Street.

For national elections, the parish forms part of the Hertford and Stortford constituency.

=== Administrative history ===
Much Hadham was an ancient parish in the Edwinstree hundred of Hertfordshire. From 1835, the parish formed part of the Bishop's Stortford poor law union, a group of parishes which collectively administered their responsibilities under the poor laws. When elected parish and district councils were established in 1894, Much Hadham was given a parish council and included in the Hadham Rural District, which covered those rural parishes from the Bishop's Stortford poor law union which lay within Hertfordshire. The Hadham Rural District was abolished in 1935, when Much Hadham became part of the Braughing Rural District, which was in turn abolished in 1974 on the creation of East Hertfordshire.

== Education ==
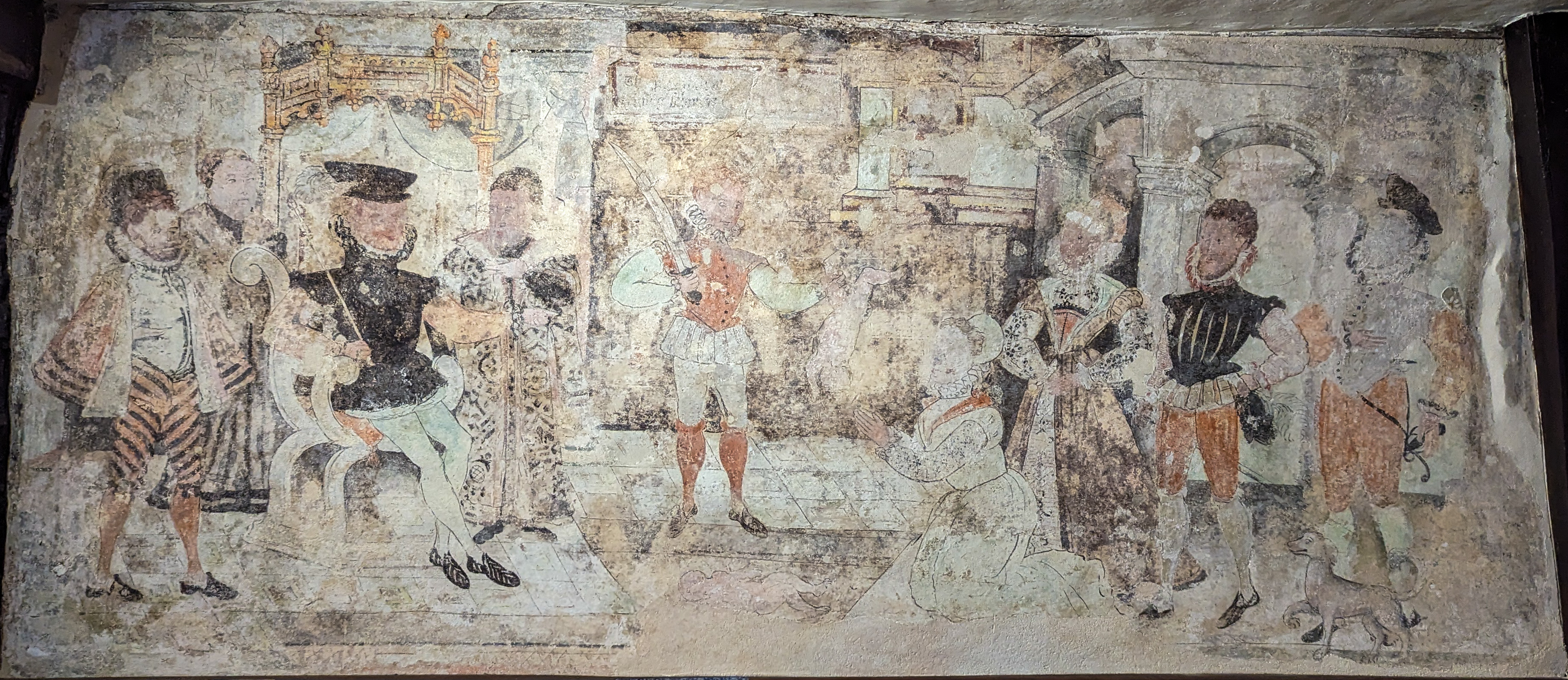
Wall painting at The Forge Museum: "The judgement of Solomon" depicting Elisabeth I as Solomon.

St Andrew's Church of England Primary School in Much Hadham is a Church of England school with links to the parish church of St Andrew's. It has about 250 pupils between the ages of 4 and 11. The school also has a nursery in the mornings for younger children. A village school has existed in the village since the 1840s. The first now known as the Flint House. A second independent pre prep school in Much Hadham, the Barn School, closed in 1998. There is also a pre-school with about 40 children aged between 2 and 4.

Outside the village of Much Hadham in the hamlet of Perry Green there is St. Elizabeth's School and residence for children and young adults with epilepsy, established in 1903, the second largest employer in the District.

Much Hadham has a small museum, The Forge Museum, which contains preserved Elizabethan wall-paintings as well as information about local history. The Henry Moore Foundation in Perry Green houses a large collection of the artist's work.

== Sport ==
The village has the charitable Sports Association which runs the publicly owned Recreation Ground and facilities. There is an infants' playground and a newly refurbished sports pavilion completed in 2015, used by the village football team and for social events.

Much Hadham Cricket Club (founded in 1889) withdrew from the Herts & Essex League in 2007 and cricket is now no longer played. The village has a football team and Tennis and Bowls Clubs are open to anyone to join for an annual fee, all on the Recreation Ground.

== Notable residents ==
Adjacent to the church is Much Hadham Palace, a country home of the Bishops of London for 800 years. Edmund Tudor, father of Henry VII, may have been born there. It was sold by the church for the last time in 1888.

- Alexander Nowell, dean of St Paul's, was rector of Much Hadham from 1862 and fished in the river Ash.
- The sculptor Henry Moore lived in Perry Green until his death.
- Charles Fitzroy Doll, architect, lived at Hadham Towers.
- Michael O'Connell, a textile artist, lived in Perry Green from 1937 until his death.
- A. C. de la Mare, paleographer and the granddaughter of the poet Walter de la Mare, was brought up in Much Hadham.

== See also ==
- The Hundred Parishes
