= Much Hadham Palace =

Manor house in Much Hadham, Hertfordshire, England, UK

Coordinates: 51°51′28″N 0°04′34″E

Much Hadham House is a manor house adjacent to the church in Much Hadham, Hertfordshire, England, formerly belonging to the Bishops of London. It is a Grade II* listed building.

== History ==
The house was originally established as the home of the Bishops of London before the Norman conquest of England in 1066. The home of Owen Tudor and his wife, Catherine of Valois, it became the birthplace of their son, Edmund in about 1430.

The present house, which dates to the early 16th century, was sequestrated during the English Civil War in 1647 and then reverted to the Bishop of London at the Restoration of the Monarchy in 1660. It became a lunatic asylum in 1817 until it passed back to the Ecclesiastical Commissioners in 1868. It was sold as a private house in 1888 and after World War II it became the home of Major Sir Edward Beddington-Behrens. The house is now a terrace of three homes, Palace House, Palace East and Palace West which are today in private ownership.
