= Katherine de la Pole =

Abbess of Barking Abbey

Lady Katherine de la Pole (1410/1411 – 1473) was the abbess of Barking Abbey.

== Life ==
Katherine de la Pole was born about 1410. She was the eldest daughter of Michael de la Pole, 2nd Earl of Suffolk and Katherine de Stafford.

She became abbess of Barking Abbey in January 1433. In this capacity, between 1437 and 1440, she took care of Edmund and Jasper Tudor, the two eldest sons of Catherine of Valois (widowed queen of King Henry V of England) by her second husband Owen Tudor. Katherine persuaded King Henry VI to take an interest in the boys, who were his half-brothers. Henry later ennobled them, thereby instigating one of the important steps to Edmund's son Henry Tudor later claiming the English throne. Edmund's wife Lady Margaret Beaufort, mother of Henry Tudor, had been a ward of Katherine's brother, William de la Pole, steward of the royal household.

There is a story about a slippery priest named Robert Colynson who managed to cheat her out of five pounds. He had offered to go to Rome and to say prayers for the nuns. He was paid five pounds in 1453 but he never went.

Her abbey's water supply was ransomed by John Rigby of Cranbrook Manor in 1462. The water conduit to the abbey had broken and John Rigby had it repaired. He then decided that the abbey should pay an annual fee for its water supply. Katherine de la Pole was annoyed at this and instigated work to find an alternative and independent supply from their own spring.

She died at Barking Abbey in 1473 and is presumed to have been buried there.
