= Queen Catharine; or, The Ruines of Love =

Historical tragedy written by Mary Pix

Queen Catherine; or, the Ruines of Love, is a historical tragedy written by Mary Pix, first performed in 1698. A historical adaptation of the Wars of the Roses, it fictionalises Edward IV’s supposed plot for revenge against Catherine of Valois (the widow of the late Henry V) and her second husband Owen Tudor. The play's epilogue was written by Catharine Trotter Cockburn.

== Summary ==
=== Act 1 ===
Edward IV speaks to his council about their impending battle with Queen Catherine's army. He then tells his brother, the Duke of Gloucester, that Catherine long ago rejected his affections because she was in love with Owen Tudor. Edward remains bitter and wants vengeance, so Gloucester offers to kill Tudor in front of Catherine.

As Edward leaves, the spy Malavill tells Gloucester that he witnessed the Duke of Clarence (Edward and Gloucester's brother) secretly meeting with Catherine's lady, Isabella.

=== Act 2 ===
Act II opens with Queen Catherine in Ludlow Castle. She receives a letter from her old love Tudor, asking her to meet in secret. She also speaks with Isabella and advises her to end her relationship with Clarence.

After Catherine leaves, Lord Thyrrold enters and begs Isabella to return his love, but she refuses. She meets Clarence and agrees to run away with him to France to start a new life together. Clarence tells Isabella to give Malavill the outer key to the castle, so that he can meet her at midnight.

Gloucester tells Edward about the relationship between Clarence and Isabella, which they wish to prevent. Gloucester plans to make Clarence jealous of a fictitious relationship between Isabella and Thyrrold, who agrees to pose as her supposed husband.

=== Act 3 ===
Owen Tudor joyfully reunites with Catherine. Elsewhere, Isabella reluctantly gives over the castle's outer key to Malavill, as Clarence instructed her.

Clarence receives a letter from Thyrrold (posing as Isabella's husband), and becomes convinced that Isabella has deceived him.

Gloucester reports to Edward that his plan for vengeance against Tudor is now in motion, and they set forth for Ludlow Castle.

=== Act 4 ===
Clarence starts to become suspicious of Malavill when they discuss the supposedly deceitful Isabella. Suddenly, Malavill is stabbed by some men, and as he dies he begins to tell Clarence the truth about Isabella's faithfulness. Before the spy can reveal the full truth, he dies.

Isabella instructs her own lady, Esperanza, to prepare their disguises for her departure with Clarence. Catherine and Tudor enter, and Catherine notices Isabella's pale face and trembling hands. Guilt-stricken, Isabella tells Catherine that she is ill and leaves the room. Catherine is uneasy and tells Tudor that she feels a strange terror.

Esperanza bursts into the room, crying out that armed men have broken into the castle. Catherine locks the door and Tudor hides. Edward, Gloucester, Thyrrold and their men enter the room and search for Tudor. Upon hearing Edward accuse him of cowardice, Tudor leaves his hiding place and stands before them. Isabella enters and tries to stay with her Queen, but Gloucester tells Thyrrold he can do whatever he wants with her. Catherine pleads for Tudor's life, but Gloucester stabs him. She then begs to be killed alongside him, but Edward commands that she not be harmed. Catherine refuses to let go of Tudor's body, but is eventually taken away from the scene.

=== Act 5 ===
Edward exults in his victory at Ludlow Castle, and states that he is willing to make peace with Catherine.

Isabella, who has in the meantime been forced to marry Thyrrol, finds out about Tudor's death. Thyrrold insists that Isabella submit to him, but she refuses. As she laments her position, Clarence and his men burst in. During the chaos, Isabella is stabbed. She and Clarence realise that Malavill betrayed them both, and she dies after asking him to bring her body to the Queen. Clarence makes ready to kill himself, but Warwick convinces him to fulfill Isabella's request.

The grief-stricken Catherine tells her advisor Lord Dacres that she cannot live without Tudor. Dacres gets her children to kneel before her, reminding Catharine that she promised to find a way to carry on for their sakes. She agrees to go to a monastery to live out the rest of her days. Esparanza brings news of Isabella's death, and says that her last wish was for the Queen to forgive her deceit. Catherine forgives Isabella, and prepares to head to the monastery.

The play closes with Edward ordering his men to march on London, where he will continue the war for the English throne.

== Performance history ==
The play was first performed in 1698 by Betterton's company at Lincoln' s Inn Fields.

== Reception ==
Queen Catharine has been studied as an example of a feminist reaction to traditional male-centred history plays.
