= Battle of Mortimer's Cross =

1461 battle in the English Wars of the Roses

- Part of the Wars of the Roses
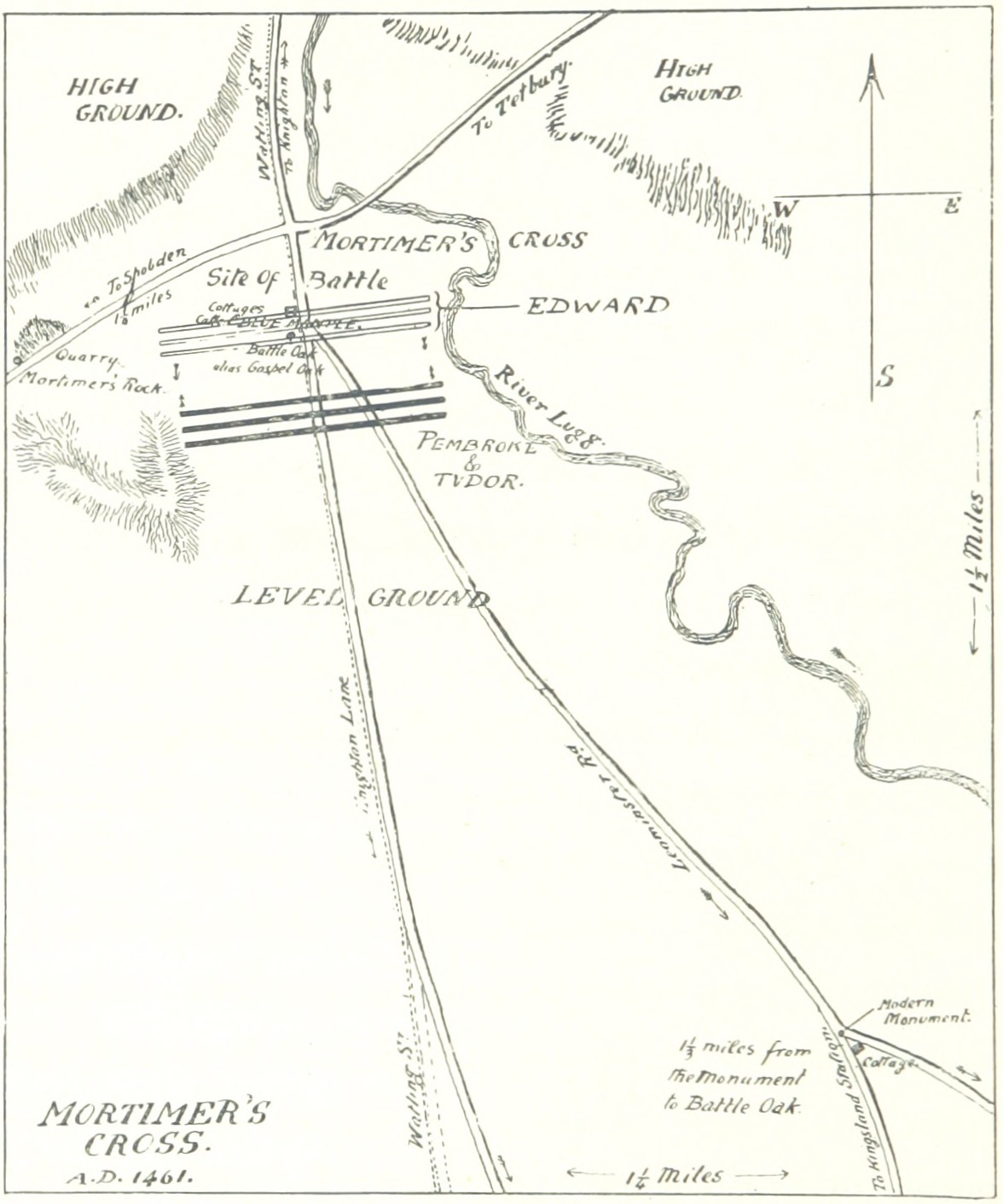
- Map of the battle by Charles Raymond Booth Barrett (1896)
| Date | 2 February 1461 |
| Location | Kingsland in Herefordshire, England 52.259°N 2.838°W |
| Result | Yorkist victory |

Belligerents
| House of York | House of Lancaster |

Commanders and leaders
| Duke of York; William Herbert; Lord Ferrers of Chartley | Owen Tudor (executed); Earl of Pembroke; Earl of Wiltshire |

Strength
| 5,000 | Unknown |

Casualties and losses
| Unknown | 4,000 |

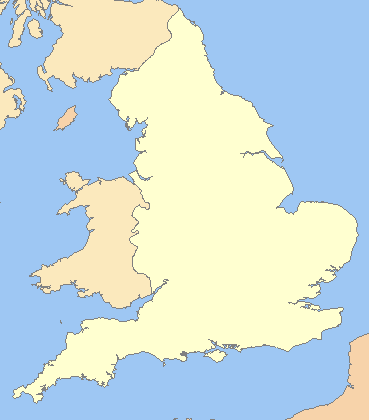
Locations:

– Battle of Mortimer's Cross; – other battles; – other places

The Battle of Mortimer's Cross was fought on 2 February, 1461 near Kingsland, Herefordshire (between Leominster and Leintwardine, by the River Lugg), not far from the Welsh border. It was a major battle of the Wars of the Roses. The opposing forces consisted of, on one side, an army led by Jasper Tudor and his father, Owen Tudor, as well as nobles loyal to King Henry VI of the House of Lancaster, his wife, Margaret of Anjou, and their seven-year-old son, Edward, Prince of Wales. On the other side, was the army of Edward, Earl of March. Some sources say it was fought on 3 February, and the exact location has been the subject of some speculation.

== Background ==
In 1460, while King Henry VI was being held prisoner, Richard, Duke of York (father of Edward, Earl of March) attempted to depose Henry and become king himself. His closest supporters dissuaded him from this step, but he secured an Act of Accord by which he and his descendants would inherit the throne on Henry's death, thus disinheriting Henry's young son Edward, Prince of Wales. Inspired by Henry's queen, Margaret of Anjou, York's enemies and rivals began gathering armies in Wales and Northern England. York sent Edward of March, his 18-year-old eldest son, to gather support in the Welsh Marches while he himself led an army to the north. On 30 December, York led his men into a trap at the Battle of Wakefield where he was killed.

With York's death, his titles and claim to the throne passed to Edward of March, now the 4th Duke of York, Edward wanted to prevent Lancastrian forces from Wales, led by Owen Tudor and his son Jasper, Earl of Pembroke, from joining the main Lancastrian army. The elder Tudor had been the second husband of Catherine of Valois, widow of Henry V. Their sons (Jasper and Edmund Tudor), who were Henry VI's half-brothers were made earls. The Tudor family became a major power in South Wales. His army included Welshmen, drawn especially from the Tudor lands in Carmarthenshire and Pembrokeshire, along with French and Breton mercenaries and Irish troops led by James Butler, Earl of Wiltshire and Ormond. Edward was based at Wigmore Castle and gathered his army from the counties at the English border with significant Welch presence as well. Lord Audley, Lord Grey of Wilton, Sir William Herbert of Raglan, Sir Walter Devereux and Humphrey Stafford were among his leading supporters. After Christmas in Gloucester, he learned of the death of his father and younger brother and began preparing to return to London. However, when Jasper Tudor's army began approaching London, he changed his plan. To prevent Tudor from joining the main Lancastrian force which was advancing on London, Edward marched north with an army of approximately five thousand men to meet the enemy at Mortimer's Cross.

== Parhelion ==
As dawn broke, the meteorological phenomenon known as parhelion occurred: three suns were seen to be rising. The appearance of this sun dog so soon before the battle seems to have frightened his troops, but Edward of York appears to have convinced them that it represented the Holy Trinity and that therefore God was on their side. He later took it as his emblem, the "Sun in splendour". The event was dramatised by William Shakespeare in King Henry VI, Part 3 (see below) and in Sharon Kay Penman's The Sunne in Splendour.

== Battle ==
One of York's advisers, Sir Richard Croft, a local lord from Croft Castle, recommended positioning archers at the crossroads (Roman Road and Ogilby Road) in order to halt the Lancastrian advance. Pembroke's army was about a thousand men smaller than York's and, being untried in battle at that point, may not have originally planned to fight but by midday it was clear that they would have to in order to cross the Lugg. The Lancastrians commenced the attack—Butler's 'battle' (division) led the first assault forcing Edward's right wing to retreat across the road, where this flank dissolved. Pembroke faced Edward's centre division and was held off but, most decisively, Owen Tudor attempted an encirclement of the Yorkist left wing; his ‘battle’ was defeated and a rout commenced. Pembroke's centre then also broke and the battle was won. Owen Tudor's men were now in full flight: some of them were followed as far as Hereford, approximately seventeen miles (27 km), and where Owen was himself captured and beheaded.

== Aftermath ==
The battle having intruded on York's plans to march to the midlands, Richard Neville, Earl of Warwick, with the captive King Henry in his train, was meanwhile forced to move to block Margaret's army's route to London on his own. He took up position north of St Albans astride the main road from the north (the ancient Roman road known as Watling Street). Although he lost the battle that followed, and Margaret of Anjou and her army could now march unopposed on to London, they did not do so. The Lancastrian army's reputation for pillage caused the Londoners to bar the gates. This in turn caused Margaret to hesitate, as did the news of the Yorkist victory at Mortimer's Cross. The Lancastrians fell back through Dunstable, losing many Scots and Borderers who deserted and returned home with the plunder they had already gathered. Edward of March and Warwick entered London on 2 March, and Edward was quickly proclaimed King Edward IV of England. Within a few weeks he had confirmed his hold on the throne with a decisive victory at the Battle of Towton.

== Alignment controversy ==
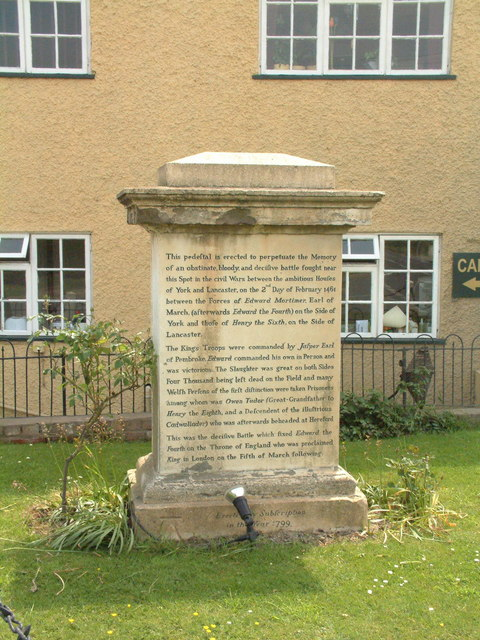
1799 memorial to the battle in Kingsland

Conventional sketch maps of Mortimer's Cross show the armies facing each other across the valley with the River Lugg at the rear of Edward's Yorkist army. This almost east/west alignment is partly based on the supposed approach routes of both armies. It has been pointed out that this would mean that Yorkist Edward had the river at his back, an obstacle which would invite disaster if the Yorkists were either pushed back or routed. His fleeing men would be cut down from behind while trying to wade the shallows. Edward was known to be militarily astute (or at least well advised) and he is likely to have been well aware of this risk. Writing for Hobilar, the Journal of the Lance and Longbow Society Andy Lamkowski suggests that a second battlefield alignment is quite plausible; that Edward drew up across the valley with the River Lugg on his left (with the Yorkists facing almost south) and the Lancastrians drew up facing almost north with the river on their right. The narrowness of the valley close to the bridge would probably mean that the two armies each drew up in a column of three divisions—if they fought close to the river crossing—but the ground widens significantly towards the present Battle Acre Cottage and Drybridge House. At that point a traditional 'three units' battle line is possible. Author Andrew Boardman also suggests that an alternative interpretation is possible saying: "It may be safe to assume that the battle was fought somewhere in the vicinity, possibly with the river securing the flanks of both armies and the hills the other". Andrew Boardman also quotes William Gregory (Gregory's Chronicle) saying that Edward: "Met his enemies on a fair plain near to Mortimer's Cross, not far from Hereford East". The usual placing of the battle in the valley beside the bridge is not 'a fair plain' but the area around Battle Acre Cottage or Drybridge House—to the south-south-east—meets that description. Andy Lamkowski also makes the point that if the Lancastrian force approached from the south rather than the west then a north/south alignment is more likely, Edward would be deploying across the valley width to prevent them moving north and would have the advantage of anchoring his flanks on the slopes of the narrowing valley and/or the River Lugg itself.

== In Shakespeare ==
Shakespeare described this parhelion phenomenon and its portentous symbolism in Act Two Scene One of Henry VI, Part 3:

Three glorious suns, each one a perfect sun;
Not separated with the racking clouds,
But sever'd in a pale clear-shining sky.
See, see! they join, embrace, and seem to kiss,
As if they vow'd some league inviolable:
Now are they but one lamp, one light, one sun.
In this the heaven figures some event.

Shakespeare omits mention of the battle.
