= Katherine of Sutton =

Katherine of Sutton, Abbess of Barking (fl. 1358–1376) was a Benedictine nun and is thought to be England's first female playwright.

== Biography ==
As Barking Abbey only accepted women of noble birth, it is almost certain that Katherine was born into nobility. Her position as Abbess of Barking would have ranked her equivalent to a Baroness in medieval English aristocracy.

Katherine held office from 1358 to 1376, during the peak of Barking Abbey’s existence. When she became the abbess of Barking Abbey in 1358, she inherited a very powerful position of authority and publicity. As the abbess, she was responsible for both the political and theological affairs of the convent. She was also responsible for the safety and well-being of all nuns in her convent, in addition to leading and planning the liturgical ceremonies. Typically in English convents, the nun of the highest ranking was considered the supreme authority and had the most responsibility. Specifically, the abbess was required to provide goods and services for royal wars, as well as housing criminals until trial. In order to display her power, the abbess carried a staff similar to a bishop's crozier.

The most historically significant power that Katherine had as an abbess was the ability to initiate changes in the liturgical practices of the convent. This was particularly significant because although some women during this time period were able to hold power in a clerical position, a man was usually present as the overall supervisor. In the case of an abbess, there was always a bishop alongside her in office, however it is unclear as to whether or not she had to report to him before making any official changes or decisions. If any changes were made to the liturgical processes, the abbess would record them in the Ordinale, a manuscript of Barking’s customs. This book was passed down to each abbess, and was for her eyes only.

Regardless of whether or not she had to report to the Bishop of London, Katherine made several changes to the liturgical process of the convent. Under her progressive authority, Katherine incorporated performing arts into the celebration of Easter, in an effort to stimulate the audience and continue their devotion towards God.

== Easter plays ==
Katherine is thought to have directed three sung Latin liturgical dramas, which were performed in Barking Abbey towards the end of the fourteenth century. These survived in one manuscript, which is now in University College, Oxford (MS 169). There is little to suggest that Katherine wrote the plays, which follow the wording and conventions of earlier Latin liturgical Easter plays. The preface the dramas states that Katherine rearranged plays so that the Descensus and Elevatio were performed after the third responsory of Matins, instead of before Matins, when had traditionally taken place 'according to ancient ecclesiastic custom'. The preface states further that she did this in order to eliminate growing 'human sluggishness' and slack devotion among the people.

There were four plays in all: Depositio, Descensus, Elevatio, and Visitatio Sepulchri.

=== Depositio ===
The first of the four plays, Depositio, was celebrated on Good Friday. In this play, two priests representing Joseph and Nicodemus take down a sculpture of Christ from the cross above the altar, while singing an antiphon. They then wash its wounds in wine and water. This washing has not been seen in other liturgical dramas. They then lay this image in a niche within the church, together with a woollen coverlet and a pillow. This burial attests to a growing interest in the late medieval period to represent Christ's death as vividly, and realistically as possible.

=== Descensus Christi ===
Descensus Christi presents the Harrowing of Hell, when, after his death, Christ descends into hell to rescue the souls that have been trapped there. During this performance, the entire convent, the Abbess along with a few priests stand in a side chapel, each holding a palm and an unlit candle. They represent the souls of the holy fathers in Hell. The officiating priest together with two deacons walk to the door of this chapel and sing the antiphon Tollite portas (tear down your gates). They then reslease the 'souls' from the chapel and process through the choir.

=== Elevatio ===
The Elevatio follows directly on from the Descensus. It represent's Christ's resurrection. In the Barking version, the officiating priest enters the 'tomb' and takes out what the text calls 'the Lord's body in a glass', which he holds before the congregation while singing the antiphon Christ is risen. This body in glass is probably a host in a monstrance.

=== Visitatio ===
The three Marys, played by nuns dressed in white surpluses and white veils, visit Christ’s tomb and discover that the body has vanished. The play then acts out John 20:15, in which Christ appears to Mary Magdalene, who then sings the news to her companions. They then go to stand on the steps in front of the altar and announce Christ's resurrection to the apostles. The play finishes with the hymn O God we praise thee.

== Legacy ==
The liturgical dramas of Barking Abbey have been credited with setting the stage for several other dramas in later years. The theatrical literature of late medieval France, Germany and Britain displays noticeable characteristics, modeled after the plays at Barking Abbey. The plays are also important in that they feature nuns playing male characters.
