= Coat of arms of the London Borough of Barking and Dagenham =

Coat of arms of Barking and Dagenham
- Armiger: Mayor and Burgesses of the London Borough of Barking and Dagenham
- Adopted: 1 September 1965
- Shield: Per saltire Gules and barry wavy of eight Argent and Azure in chief between two Keys in saltire a Sword palewise point downwards in base two Croziers with Sudarium in saltire surmounting a Lily slipped and leaved and in the flanks a representation of a Barking Well Smack in full sail to the sinister and a Cog Wheel all Or
- Motto: Dei gratia probemur rebus

The coat of arms of the London Borough of Barking and Dagenham was granted on 1 September 1965 to the council of the borough. The council is the local authority for Barking and Dagenham, Greater London, England.

The coat of arms is based on those of Barking Borough Council and Dagenham Borough Council, the predecessors of the current local authority. The various elements represent the borough; the crest, for example, includes the surviving tower of Barking Abbey.

== Design ==
The patron saints of the church of Dagenham are Saint Peter and Saint Paul, and their symbols of keys and sword respectively can be seen in the shield's upper field. The borough is situated on the north bank of the River Thames and the shield has representation of water, a fishing boat (a so-called Barking Well Smack, which was invented in the 18th century) and a cogwheel to represent the river's importance to the borough, its fishing industry and its industry in general. The crossed crosiers and the lily in the fourth field stand for the former Abbey of Barking (founded 666 and dissolved in 1539), the crosiers were also present in the arms of the former Borough of Barking and the lily in the arms of the former Borough of Dagenham.

Coats of arms of the former Municipal Boroughs of Barking (top) and Dagenham (bottom)

The arms displays the Curfew tower of Barking Abbey in its crest, this is taken from the old arms of the former Municipal Borough of Barking, granted in 1931. The tower is set before a rising sun, a symbol for progress, which was present in the arms of the former Borough of Dagenham, granted in 1936. The supporters are similar to those of the former Borough of Barking: the lions standing for the Cecil and Monteagle families while the torches represent the main industries from the time of the grant of the old arms, which were gas and electricity. To the 1931 supporters have been added collars for heraldic differencing. The collars are coloured black and red, the principal colours of the arms of Barking and Dagenham respectively.

The motto, Dei gratia probemur rebus, is Latin for "By God’s grace, let us be judged by (our) deeds." It is a combination of those of the two merged boroughs: Barking's Dei gratia sumus quod sumus (By God's grace, we are what we are) and Dagenham's "Judge us by our Deeds".

== Blazon ==
Arms: Per saltire Gules and barry wavy of eight Argent and Azure in chief between two Keys in saltire a Sword palewise point downwards in base two Croziers with Sudarium in saltire surmounting a Lily slipped and leaved and in the flanks a representation of a Barking Well Smack in full sail to the sinister and a Cog Wheel all Or.

Crest: On a Wreath Argent and Azure in front of a demi Sun in splendour Or a representation of the Curfew Tower of Barking proper.

Supporters: On either side a Lion Or gorged with a Collar per pale Sable and Gules holding a Torched inflamed Or.

Motto: Dei gratia probemur rebus.

== Badge ==
A Roundel per pale Sable and Gules charged with two Croziers and a Lily as in the Arms.

== See also ==
- Armorial of London
