= Clemence of Barking =

12th-century nun and poet-translator

Clemence of Barking (fl. 1163–1200) was a 12th-century Benedictine nun and Anglo-Norman poet-translator of Barking Abbey. She is noted for writing a translation of the biography, the Life of Saint Catherine. Clemence's hagiography of Saint Catherine of Alexandria is widely regarded as, what would be considered today, a Christian feminist text.

== Life in Barking Abbey ==
Clemence was a nun of Barking Abbey during the 12th century. Barking Abbey was a royal monastery located in the Essex Borough of Barking and Dagenham, Essex, England. Dedicated to the Virgin Mary, the abbey was established in the seventh century around 666 AD and followed the Rule of Saint Benedict. It is very likely that Barking Abbey was one of the first monasteries founded in Britain, and it retained close ties to the British monarchy throughout its existence. Mary, the sister of Thomas Becket, was appointed as abbess by Henry II during Clemence's time at the abbey of Barking. Many of the abbesses at Barking Abbey were familially related to the British royal house, and likely often selected by the monarch until the early thirteenth century. The nuns of Barking Abbey were granted with a level of social, political, and economic independence that was generally only seen in religious houses that were directly associated with social and political elites, such as the British monarchy. Because Barking Abbey was one of the most wealthy monasteries in Britain at the time, the nuns at Barking were allowed more freedom to pursue cultural and literary interests. The nuns of Barking Abbey were also granted a great deal of theological independence. The nuns often set their own liturgy, and contributed to the ecclesiastical and liturgical expansion of their religious community through letters to other monasteries. As a nun of Barking Abbey, Clemence was part of an elite religious community under the protection of British monarchy.

In addition to her work, many other texts have been associated with the abbey of Barking, including Guernes de Pont-Sainte-Maxence's Life of Thomas Becket, and Adgar's Gracial. Under the Rule of St. Benedict, daily reading in both private and communal settings was both required and necessary to properly celebrate the Bible. The presence of Barking Abbey's library suggests that reading and literature were significant components of daily life. The nuns contributed texts at the monasteries; however, very few medieval monastery manuscripts remain, making it difficult to discern how much writing nuns were contributing at the time. It is likely that Barking's nuns were creating texts to be shared with each other, with royalty, and other outside visitors. Following the Cluniac Reforms of the eleventh and twelfth centuries, the production of books was encouraged, and women were contributing more writing as a result.

There is very limited information about Clemence outside of her writings and association with Barking Abbey, as she lived a relatively anonymous life. Her monastery and its historical and political connections may reveal the most about Clemence. The only identifiable traces of Clemence's life are in her translation of the Life of Saint Catherine, in which she leaves the signature, "I who have translated [St. Catherine's] life, by name am called Clemence. I am a nun of Barking. For the love of her I undertook this work." It is believed that Clemence also translated an anonymous Anglo-Norman version of Aelred of Rievaulx's Latin Life of St. Edward the Confessor, which was composed at Barking Abbey between 1163 and 1170. Nonetheless, there is not enough evidence to determine who translated the Life of St. Edward, as anonymous writing was common in Middle English literature, and even more common among women writers.

== Life of Saint Catherine of Alexandria ==
Clemence of Barking Abbey is primarily known for her translation of the Life of Saint Catherine. Her translation of the text from Latin to vernacular French has been the subject of extensive analysis by literary scholars, with particular regard to the politics of the translation. Although there is little evidence indicating whether Clemence's translation had any influence and impact on her successors, current interest in her translation has significantly increased, and the text is widely revisited today as a source for feminist analysis.

Clemence's account of Saint Catherine is based on an eleventh-century rendition of the Latin Vulgate, which was written during the monastic revival in Normandy. Despite the lack of remaining copies of Clemence's translation, it is believed to have been relatively popular at the time of its release. Clemence's version of the account is regarded as being one of the earliest vernacular lives of the saints, and one of the only accounts written by a woman, which reveals Clemence's significance as a translator situated in the middle of England's early medieval literary development.

A prominent point of scholarly analysis is the differences of attitude towards gender between Clemence's translation and the Vulgate rendition. Many scholars suggest that Clemence's translation is a gender positive re-interpretation of the Vulgate rendition, and is perhaps meant to partially act as social commentary on women's role in society at the time. In the opening lines of Clemence's text, Clemence declares her intention to "translator la vie / De Latin respundre en rumanz / Pur ço que plus plaise as oianz" (to translate the life, expounding it from Latin into the vernacular, in order to please more those who hear it). Scholars argue that in this portion of the translation, Clemence employed self-authorization. Because the act of writing was already quite subversive for twelfth-century women in Europe, Clemence's strategy of self-authorization is regarded as a bold move. Scholars also suggest that Clemence's reclamation of authority was a strategy for taking hold of patriarchal depictions of women in literature in order to reinterpret them as a woman for women. Scholar, Gina J. Froese writes that Clemence's work "hints at an authorial anxiety that suggests a send of unease with the process of subverting and reclaiming. Though she follows and sometimes mimics the structure, form, and style her male predecessors also apply, we clearly find indications of protest against misogynistic views and corrections of such interpretations that place her at odds with the authority of her predecessors."

== Works ==
- The life of St. Catherine, Ed. William MacBain, Anglo-Norman Text Society, Oxford, Backwell, 1964.
