= Jasper Tudor =

Anglo-Welsh nobleman (1431–1495)

- Duke of Bedford; Earl of Pembroke
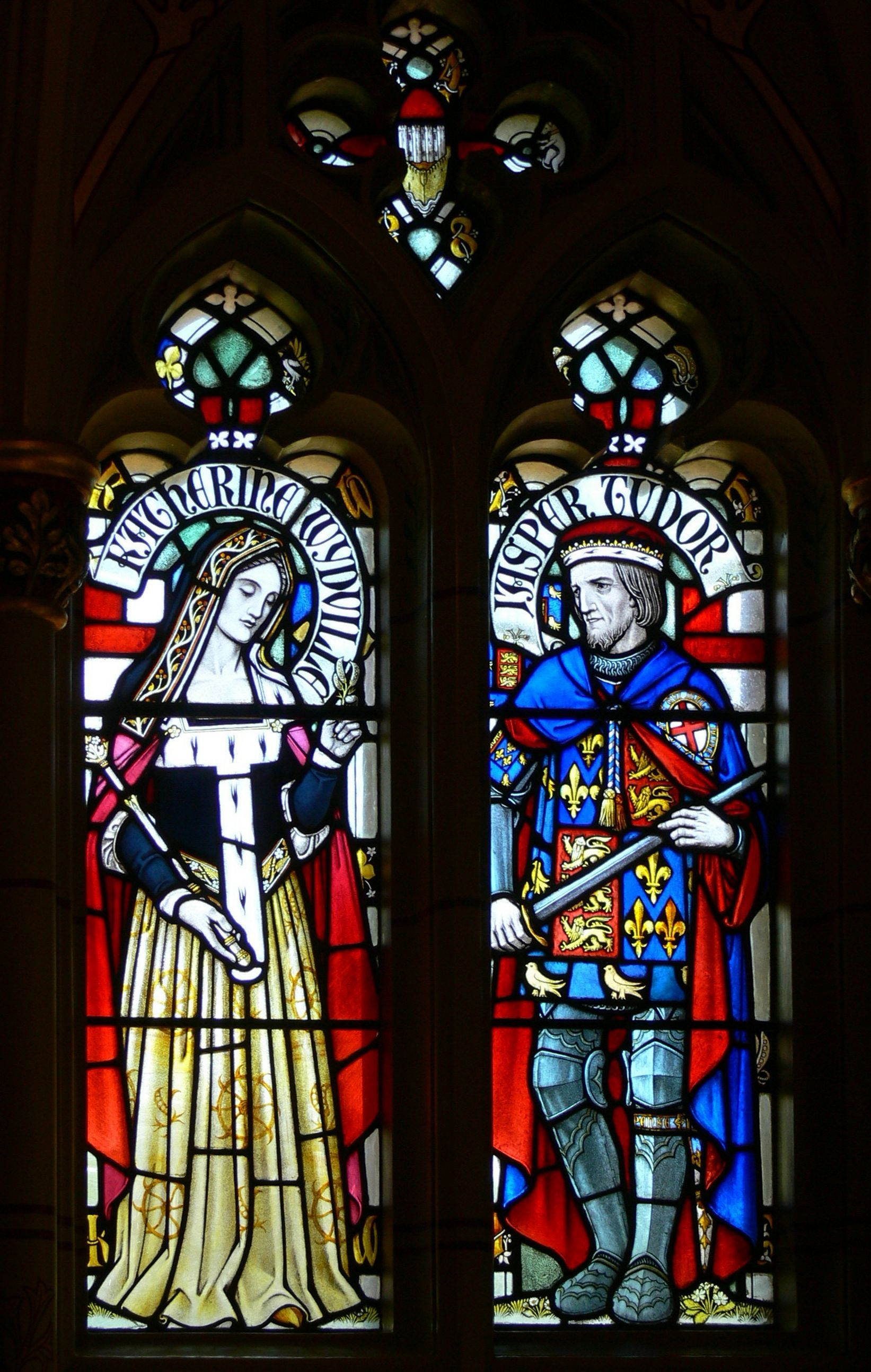
- Jasper Tudor and his wife Catherine Woodville, depicted at Cardiff Castle (Wales)
- Born: c. November 1431; Hatfield, Hertfordshire
- Died: 21 December 1495 (age 64); Thornbury Castle, Gloucestershire
- Buried: Keynsham Abbey, Somerset, England
- Noble family: Tudor
- Spouse: Katherine Woodville (m. 1485)
- Father: Owen Tudor
- Mother: Catherine of Valois

Coat of arms of Jasper Tudor

Jasper Tudor, Duke of Bedford (c. November 1431 – 21 December 1495) was the uncle of King Henry VII of England and a leading architect of his nephew's successful accession to the throne in 1485. He was a member of the Tudor family of Penmynydd.

Jasper Tudor's coat of arms, granted to him by his maternal half-brother, King Henry VI, quarters the three lilies of France with the three lions of England, with the addition of a bordure azure with martlets or (that is, a blue border featuring golden martlets).

== Family and early life ==
Jasper was the second son of Sir Owen Tudor and the former queen Catherine of Valois, the widow of King Henry V of England. He was thus half-brother to Henry VI. Through his father, Jasper was a descendant of Ednyfed Fychan, Llywelyn the Great's renowned chancellor. His mother was a daughter of King Charles VI of France.

Jasper was born at the bishop of Ely's manor at Hatfield, Hertfordshire, in 1431, his parents' second child. After the death of Jasper's mother in 1437, Owen Tudor was arrested and sent to Newgate prison. Jasper, his brother Edmund, and possibly a sister were put into the care of Katherine de la Pole, abbess of Barking Abbey, in Essex, from July 1437 to March 1442. She was the sister of William de la Pole, 1st Duke of Suffolk, a great favourite of Henry VI, and was able to provide Jasper and his siblings with food, clothing, and lodging. They were also permitted servants to wait upon them as the King's half-siblings.

In 1442, their half-brother the King began to take an interest in their upbringing. Sometime after March 1442, Jasper and his brother were brought to live at court. Henry arranged for the best priest to educate them intellectually and morally. The brothers also received military training; when they grew up they were given military positions. Jasper was recognised as Henry VI's uterine half-brother when, on 23 November 1452, he was created Earl of Pembroke.

== Adulthood ==
Owen Tudor was released from prison, most likely thanks to his stepson Henry VI who, after providing for his stepfather, also provided for his two half-brothers. It is not clear whether Henry VI had known of the existence of his half-brothers until his mother told him while she was dying in Bermondsey Abbey. It was after her death that Henry would begin to care for them and eventually raise them to the peerage by giving both brothers earldoms. Jasper became Earl of Pembroke on 23 November 1452, the seventh creation and with it came Pembroke Castle. In turn, Edmund and Jasper swore unwavering loyalty to Henry and fought and promoted him and his Lancastrian family's interests persistently throughout their lives.

Owen and Catherine's marriage was not recognised by the authorities, in large part due to the secrecy under which it was accomplished, and so the legitimacy of Jasper and his two (or three) siblings was questionable. However, Jasper enjoyed all the privileges appropriate to his birth, including being invested as a Knight of the Garter. Following the First Battle of St Albans, Jasper constantly tried to work with the Duke of York and other nobles in order to try to stop the infighting between the two houses.

On the accession of the Yorkist King Edward IV in 1461, he was subject to an attainder for supporting his Lancastrian half-brother, the deposed King Henry, to whom Jasper was loyal. He strove to place his half-nephew Prince Edward of Lancaster on the throne and provided absolute loyalty to his royal half-brother and Margaret of Anjou, his half-brother's wife. Jasper would also help his other sister-in-law Lady Margaret Beaufort assist her son Henry Tudor to win the throne in 1485 as King Henry VII, father of Henry VIII.

== Wars of the Roses ==
Jasper Tudor was an adventurer whose military expertise, some of it gained in the early stages of the Wars of the Roses, was considerable. Nevertheless, the only major battle he had taken part in before the Battle of Bosworth was the Battle of Mortimer's Cross in February 1461, where he lost the battle to the future king, Edward IV. His father, Owen Tudor, was then captured and beheaded at Hereford, where his head was placed on the market cross. Jasper occupied the castles of Carmarthen and Aberystwyth in 1456 until he lost them to William Herbert of Raglan. Subsequently, he remained in touch with his sister-in-law, Margaret of Anjou, wife of his half-brother Henry VI and he held Denbigh Castle for the House of Lancaster in 1460.

Jasper Tudor also brought up his nephew, Henry Tudor, whose father, Edmund Tudor had died before his birth. After being welcomed by King Louis XI in 1462, Jasper stayed in France for 6 years before returning to North Wales in 1468. On his return, Jasper lost Pembroke Castle to William Herbert, when Herbert was given the title of Earl of Pembroke by King Edward IV.

Jasper Tudor briefly regained the earldom of Pembroke a couple of years later when his half-brother, King Henry VI, was restored to the throne, but following the return of King Edward IV from temporary exile in 1471, Jasper fled again to the continent. During his time on the continent, he travelled and attempted to gather support for the Lancastrian cause. While escaping from Tenby with his nephew Henry, storms in the English Channel forced them to land at Le Conquet in Brittany, where they sought refuge with Francis II, Duke of Brittany. Francis housed Jasper, his nephew, and the core of their group of exiled Lancastrians at the Château de Suscinio in Sarzeau and although King Edward IV placed diplomatic pressure on him, the uncle and nephew remained safe from the clutches of the Yorkist king, who died later in April 1483. For 11 years, the Château de Suscinio became an armed camp, alert against any attempt to kidnap Jasper and Henry and return them to England, where they were under attainder and would have been promptly executed as threats to the Yorkist rule.

In October 1483, the Tudors launched an invasion of England from Brittany. However, the invasion failed and Jasper Tudor and his nephew Henry returned to Brittany. In mid-1484, when the Duke of Brittany was incapacitated with illness, his treasurer, Pierre Landais, who took over the reins of government, reached an agreement with the new Yorkist king, Richard III of England, to send Jasper and his nephew back to England in exchange for a pledge of 3,000 English archers to defend Brittany against a threatened French attack. John Morton, the Bishop of Ely who was then in exile in Flanders, learned of the scheme and warned the Tudors in time. Jasper and Henry then managed to escape separately, hours ahead of Landais' soldiers, across the nearby border into France. They were received at the court of King Charles VIII of France who allowed them to stay and provided them with resources. Shortly afterwards, when Duke Francis II had recovered, he offered the 400 remaining Lancastrians, still at and around the Château de Suscinio, safe-conduct into France and even paid for their expenses.

== Tudor reign ==
On Henry Tudor's subsequent accession to the throne in 1485, Jasper Tudor had all previous attainders annulled, and was thus restored to all his former titles, including Knight of the Garter, and was created Duke of Bedford. In 1488, he took possession of Cardiff Castle.

English royal families in the Wars of the Roses

Dukes (except Aquitaine) and Princes of Wales are noted, as are the monarchs' reigns.
†=Killed in action; =Executed
See also Family tree of English monarchs

Henry of Grosmont; Duke of Lancaster	Edward III; King of England r. 1327–1377
Edward of Woodstock "The Black Prince"; Prince of Wales	Thomas of Woodstock; Duke of Gloucester	Blanche of Lancaster	John of Gaunt; Duke of Lancaster	Katherine Swynford	Edmund of Langley; Duke of York	Lionel of Antwerp; Duke of Clarence
Edward of Angoulême	Richard II; Prince of Wales, King of England r. 1377–1399	Henry IV; Duke of Lancaster, King of England r. 1399–1413	John Beaufort	Thomas Beaufort; Duke of Exeter	Joan Beaufort	Ralph Neville	Philippa of Clarence
Owen Tudor; Lancastrian	Catherine of Valois	Henry V Duke of Lancaster, Prince of Wales, King of England r. 1413–1422	Humphrey; Duke of Gloucester	Henry Percy "Hotspur"	Elizabeth Mortimer	Roger Mortimer
Edward of Norwich; Duke of York	Richard of Conisburgh	Anne de Mortimer
John Beaufort; Duke of Somerset; Lancastrian	Margaret of Anjou; Lancastrian	Henry VI; King of England r. 1422–1461, r. 1470–1471; Lancastrian	Edmund Beaufort; Duke of Somerset; Lancastrian †1st St Albans	William Neville; Yorkist	Anne Neville	Henry Percy; Lancastrian †1st St Albans	Eleanor Neville	Richard Neville; Yorkist; (executed) Wakefield	Cecily Neville	Richard of York; Duke of York, Prince of Wales; Yorkist †Wakefield
Henry Beaufort; Duke of Somerset; Lancastrian; (executed) Hexham	Richard Woodville; (executed) Edgecote	Edmund Beaufort; Duke of Somerset; Lancastrian; (executed) Tewkesbury	Margaret Beaufort	Humphrey Stafford	Henry Percy; Lancastrian †Towton	John Neville; Yorkist, then Lancastrian †Barnet	Richard Neville "Kingmaker"; Yorkist, then Lancastrian †Barnet
Margaret Beaufort; Lancastrian	Edmund Tudor; Lancastrian	Jasper Tudor; Duke of Bedford; Lancastrian	Catherine Woodville	Henry Stafford; Duke of Buckingham; Yorkist, then Lancastrian (executed)	Elizabeth Woodville	Edward IV; Duke of York, King of England r. 1461–1470, r. 1471–1483; Yorkist	George Plantagenet; Duke of Clarence; Yorkist, then Lancastrian; (executed) Tower	Edward of Westminster; Prince of Wales; Lancastrian †Tewkesbury	Anne Neville	Richard III; Duke of Gloucester, King of England r. 1483–1485; Yorkist †Bosworth Field
Henry VII; King of England; Lancastrian r. 1485–1509	Elizabeth of York	Edward V Prince of Wales, King of England r. 1483; Yorkist; (executed) Tower	Richard of Shrewsbury; Duke of York; (executed) Tower

In 1485, Jasper financed the rebuilding of the north-west tower of Llandaff Cathedral, near Cardiff. It now holds the Cathedral bells, and is named the Jasper Tower in his honour.

In 1486, Jasper was involved in helping Henry VII put down a Yorkist threat in the form of the Stafford and Lovell Rebellion. A year later, in 1487, he was also involved in assisting Henry VII with defeating the pretender Lambert Simnel, which resulted in the defeat of Yorkist rebels at the battle of Stoke Field.

After 1485, he would describe himself as the "high and mighty Prince Jasper, brother and uncle of Kings, Duke of Bedford and Earl of Pembroke". It was after the death of his elder brother, Edmund, that Jasper took over the responsibility of maintaining the Lancastrian ties within Wales. Along with this, he took into his care his sister-in-law and infant nephew.

== Marriage and children ==
Jasper was married on 7 November 1485 to Katherine Woodville (c. 1458–1497). She was the daughter of Richard Woodville, 1st Earl Rivers and Jacquetta of Luxembourg, and was sister to Edward IV's queen Elizabeth Woodville and to Anthony Woodville, 2nd Earl Rivers and Richard Woodville, 3rd Earl Rivers. She was the widow of Henry Stafford, 2nd Duke of Buckingham, who had been executed for treason in 1483. There were no children of her marriage with Jasper Tudor.

=== Illegitimate issue ===
Jasper Tudor acknowledged paternity of no illegitimate children during his lifetime and none are recognised in his will.

The earliest formal source for any illegitimate child of Jasper Tudor appears to be the Heraldic Visitation of the northern counties in 1530 by Thomas Tonge, Norroy King of Arms (d. 1534). The records of Tonge's Heraldic Visitation were first published in 1836, by the Surtees Society. They contain a claim by Prior Gardener, of Tynmouth Monastery in Northumberland, to be the son of Ellen/Helen, a bastard daughter of Jasper Tudor, Duke of Bedford, and her husband William Gardener. The heraldic arms claimed by Prior Gardener include a shield impaling the arms of Jasper Tudor, 'debruised by a bend sinister'.

Thomas Gardyner was appointed prior of Tynmouth in 1528. He was then a monk of Westminster Abbey, and 'familiar to followers of the Tudor household as a grandson of the King's great-uncle, Jasper'. His appointment as prior was actively supported by Mary Boleyn, and it is most likely that Thomas Wolsey also approved, as the priory was a dependency of St Alban's Abbey, where Wolsey was abbot.

The next source dates from the late 17th century, nearly two hundred years after Jasper Tudor's death. William Dugdale's Baronage of England (1675–6) states that Jasper Tudor "departed this Life ... leaving no other Issue than one Illegitimate Daughter, called Ellen/Helen, who became the Wife of William Gardner, Citizen of London". Dugdale (1605–1686), an eminent antiquarian and scholar, was Norroy King of Arms (1660–1679) and Garter King of Arms (1679–1686). The records of Tonge's 1530 Visitation held by the College of Arms would have been available to Dugdale.

In the 19th century the account was embroidered, to make Ellen (or Helen) the mother of Stephen Gardiner, Bishop of Winchester and Lord Chancellor. The account that Gardiner was a descendant of Jasper Tudor is now discredited: it appears that this assertion arose from confusing Stephen Gardiner, the Bishop, with Thomas Gardiner, Prior of Tynmouth.

== Death and burial ==
Jasper Tudor died at Thornbury Castle on 21 December 1495, and was buried at Keynsham Abbey in Somerset, which Lady Agnes Cheyne, the incumbent of Chenies Manor House, bequeathed to him in 1494.
