= Catherine of Valois =

Queen of England from 1420 to 1422

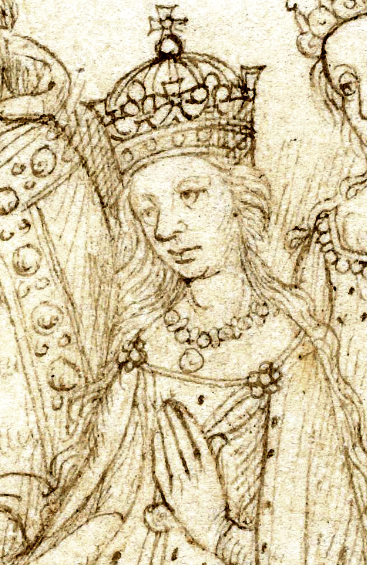
- Drawing from the Beauchamp Pageant, c. 1483–1494

Queen consort of England
- Tenure: 2 June 1420 – 31 August 1422
- Coronation: 23 February 1421
- Born: 27 October 1401; Hôtel Saint-Pol, France
- Died: 3 January 1437 (aged 35); London, England
- Burial: Westminster Abbey, London
- Spouse: Henry V of England (m. 1420; died 1422); Owen Tudor (m. c. 1428)
- Issue Detail: Henry VI of England; Edmund Tudor, Earl of Richmond; Jasper Tudor, Duke of Bedford; Edward Tudor; Margaret Tudor
- House: Valois
- Father: Charles VI of France
- Mother: Isabeau of Bavaria

Catherine of Valois or Catherine of France (27 October 1401 – 3 January 1437) was Queen of England from 1420 until 1422. A daughter of King Charles VI of France, she married King Henry V of England and was the mother of King Henry VI. (Note: Catherine's older sister Isabella had also been a Queen of England as the child bride of Richard II.) Catherine's marriage was part of a plan to eventually place Henry V on the throne of France, and perhaps end what is now known as the Hundred Years' War. But, although her son Henry VI was later crowned in Paris, the war continued.

After Henry V's death, Catherine's unexpected marriage to Sir Owen Tudor helped lead to the rise of the House of Tudor's fortunes and to her Tudor grandson's eventual elevation to the throne as King Henry VII of England.

== Early life ==
Catherine of Valois was the youngest daughter of King Charles VI of France and his wife Isabeau of Bavaria. She was born at the Hôtel Saint-Pol (a royal palace in Paris) on 27 October 1401. Early on, there had been a discussion of marrying her to Prince Henry, the son of Henry IV of England, but it was rejected due to the inflated dowry.

Some authors, such as Agnes Strickland, have maintained that Catherine was neglected as a child by her mother, with Strickland claiming that the princess and her sisters were left ‘in a piteous state.’ However, modern examination of the evidence suggests otherwise. According to the financial accounts of her mother, toys and gifts befitting a French princess were purchased, including pet turtledoves for Catherine. Religious texts were also provided, and Catherine was sent to the convent at Poissy, where her sister Marie had been consecrated, to receive an education. In 1417, Catherine accompanied her mother during her imprisonment at Tours.

== Queen of England ==
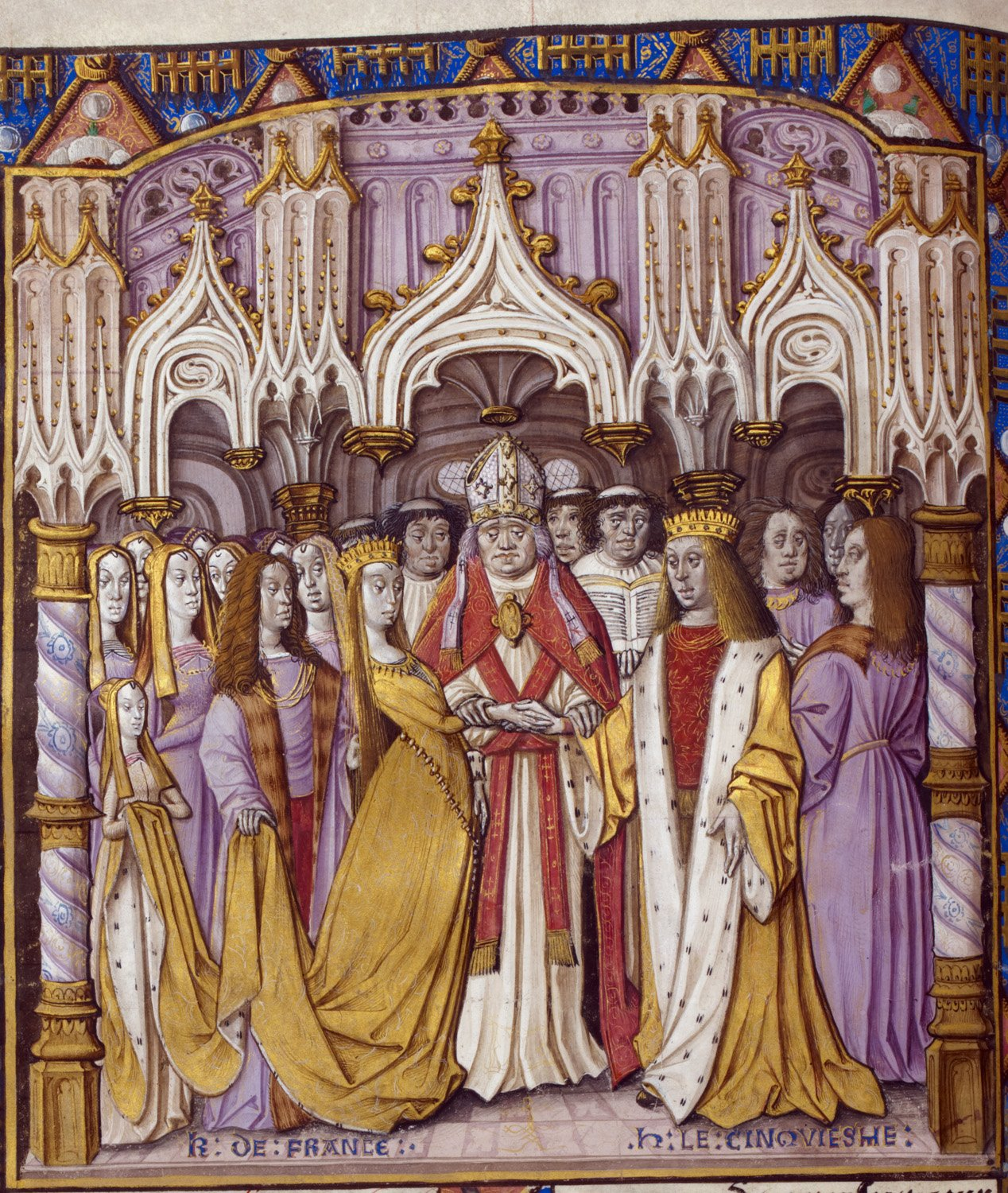
Marriage of King Henry V of England and Catherine of Valois. Illumination, Jean Chartier, Chronicle of Charles VII, av. 1494, British Library, Royal E.V., f. 9v.

In 1415 Henry V invaded France, and after the victory at Agincourt, negotiations for marriage came to a halt. After 1418, negotiations resumed and Catherine and Henry met in 1419. Catherine was said to be very attractive, and Henry became enamoured. On 21 May 1420, a peace agreement was made between England and France, the Treaty of Troyes, and Charles acknowledged Henry of England as his heir. Catherine and Henry were married at the Parish Church of St John or at Troyes Cathedral on 2 June 1420. Catherine went to England with her new husband and was crowned queen in Westminster Abbey on 23 February 1421. On 10 June 1421, Henry returned to France to continue his military campaigns.

By this time, Catherine was several months pregnant and gave birth to a son, whom she named Henry, on 6 December 1421 at Windsor. Her husband never saw their child. During the siege of Meaux, he became sick and died on 31 August 1422, aged 35. Catherine was not quite 21 and was left a queen dowager. Charles VI died a couple of months after Henry V, making the young Henry VI king of England and English-occupied northern France. Catherine doted on her son during his early childhood.

== Relationship with Owen Tudor ==
Catherine was still young and marriageable, a source of concern to her brother-in-law Humphrey, Duke of Gloucester, the guardian of her son. Rumours abounded that Catherine planned to marry Edmund Beaufort, Count of Mortain, her late husband's cousin. The Duke of Gloucester was strongly against the match, however, and the Parliament of 1427–8 passed a bill which set forth the provision that if the queen dowager remarried without the king's consent, her husband would forfeit his lands and possessions, although any children of the marriage would not suffer punishment. The king's consent was contingent upon his having attained his majority. At that time, the king was only six years old.

Catherine lived in the king's household, presumably so she could care for her young son, but the arrangement also enabled the councillors to watch over the queen dowager herself. Nevertheless, Catherine entered into a sexual relationship with Welshman Owen Maredudd Tudor, who, in 1421, in France, had been in the service of Henry V's steward Sir Walter Hungerford. Tudor was probably appointed keeper of Catherine's household or wardrobe. The relationship began when Catherine lived at Windsor Castle, and she became pregnant with their first child there. At some point, she stopped living in the King's household, and in May 1432, Parliament granted Owen the rights of an Englishman. This was important because of Henry IV's laws limiting the rights of Welshmen.

Catherine of Valois's arms as queen consort. Her arms as princess of France impaled with the arms of the Plantagenet English kings, claimants for the French throne

There is no known date of Catherine's marriage to Owen, and yet there is no contemporaneous evidence that the validity of the marriage and the legitimacy of her children were questioned in secular or canon law. From the relationship of Owen Tudor and Queen Catherine descended the Tudor dynasty of England, starting with King Henry VII. Tudor historians asserted that Owen and Catherine had been married, for their lawful marriage would add respectability and stronger royal ties to the claims of the Tudor dynasty.

Owen and Catherine had at least six children. Edmund, Jasper and Edward (who became a monk and died young) were all born away from court. They had one daughter, Margaret, who became a nun and also died young.

== Death and aftermath ==
Catherine died on 3 January 1437, shortly after childbirth, in London, and was "buried in the old Lady chapel" of Westminster Abbey. Other records state that she did not die as a result of childbirth, but entered Bermondsey Abbey, possibly seeking a cure for an illness that had troubled her for some time. She drew up her last will and testament three days before her death. She is buried at Westminster Abbey in Henry V's Chantry Chapel. After her death, Catherine's enemies decided to proceed against Owen for violating the law of the remarriage of the queen dowager. Owen appeared before the Council, was subsequently arrested, and taken to Newgate Prison. He tried to escape from there in early 1438 and eventually ended up at Windsor Castle in July of that year.

Meanwhile, Owen and Catherine's two older sons, Edmund and Jasper, went to live with Katherine de la Pole, Abbess of Barking, and sister of William de la Pole, 1st Duke of Suffolk. Sometime after 1442, the king (their half-brother) took a role in their upbringing. Owen, their father, was eventually released on £2000 bail, but was pardoned in November 1439 (and the bail cancelled in 1440). Owen was treated well afterwards and was a member of the king's household until the mid-1450s. He lived until 1461, when he was executed by the Yorkists following the Battle of Mortimer's Cross in Herefordshire. Their surviving sons were given earldoms by Catherine's son King Henry VI. With Henry's assistance Edmund married Margaret Beaufort, a descendant of both John of Gaunt and Lionel of Clarence who had consequently a claim to the throne; following the elimination by war of most other candidates, their son became King Henry VII.

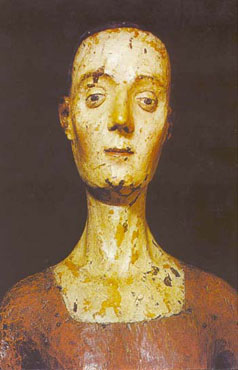
The undressed funerary effigy of Queen Catherine, as shown in 2009.

The wooden funeral effigy which was carried at Catherine's funeral still survives at Westminster Abbey, and was previously on display in the Westminster Abbey Museum in the Undercroft. It is now displayed in the new Queen's Diamond Jubilee Gallery in the abbey triforium. Her tomb originally boasted an alabaster memorial, which was deliberately destroyed during extensions to the abbey in the reign of her grandson, Henry VII. It has been suggested that Henry ordered her memorial to be removed to distance himself from his illegitimate ancestry. At this time, her coffin lid was accidentally raised, revealing her corpse, which for generations became a tourist attraction. In 1669 the diarist Samuel Pepys kissed the long-deceased queen on his birthday:

On Shrove Tuesday 1669, I to the Abbey went, and by favour did see the body of Queen Catherine of Valois, and had the upper part of the body in my hands, and I did kiss her mouth, reflecting upon it I did kiss a Queen: and this my birthday and I thirty-six years old and I did kiss a Queen.

— Samuel Pepys

Catherine's remains were not properly re-interred until the reign of Queen Victoria.

== Cultural depictions ==
Plays

- William Shakespeare's play Henry V (c. 1599) depicts Catherine of Valois' marriage to Henry V of England after the Battle of Agincourt.
- Mary Pix's play Queen Catherine; or, the Ruines of Love (1698) depicts the end of Catherine's relationship with Owen Tudor.
- Rosemary Anne Sisson's play The Queen and the Welshman (1957) tells the story of Catherine de Valois and Owen Tudor.

In historical fiction

- Catherine of Valois is the subject of Rosemary Hawley Jarman's novel Crown in Candlelight (1978)
- Margaret Frazer's medieval mystery The Boy's Tale (1995) features Catherine and her sons Edmund and Jasper.
- In The Queen's Secret by Jean Plaidy, Catherine is the title character.
- Another novel by Jean Plaidy, Epitaph for Three Women, retells the minority of Henry VI by focusing on the lives of Catherine, Joan of Arc and Eleanor, Duchess of Gloucester.
- In the historical novel, Fortune Made His Sword by Martha Rofheart, Catherine is one of five narrators who tell the story of Henry V.
- Dedwydd Jones's novel, The Lily and the Dragon (2002) tells the story of Owain Tudor and Catherine of Valois.
- Joanna Hickson's novel The Agincourt Bride (2013) tells the story of the early life of Catherine of Valois while its sequel The Tudor Bride (2014) tells of her life as the Queen of England and her relationship with Owen Tudor.
- Anne O'Brien's novel The Forbidden Queen (2013) details the life of Catherine of Valois.
- Vanora Bennett's novel Blood Royal/The Queen's Lover (2009) tells the story of Catherine's early years through her secret marriage to Owen Tudor.
- Mari Griffith's novel Root of the Tudor Rose (2014) is the story of Catherine's brief marriage to Henry V and her subsequent clandestine relationship with Owain ap Maredydd ap Tudur.

In film and TV

- In the Laurence Olivier film Henry V (1944), Catherine (listed as Katherine) is played by Renée Asherson.
- In the Kenneth Branagh film Henry V (1989), Catherine (listed as Katharine) is played by Emma Thompson.
- In the BBC adaptation of Henry V as part of The Hollow Crown TV series (2012), Catherine (listed as Katherine) is played by Mélanie Thierry.
- In the Netflix film The King (2019), Catherine is played by Lily-Rose Depp.

== Sources ==
- Adams, Tracy (2010). The Life and Afterlife of Isabeau of Bavaria. The Johns Hopkins University Press. ISBN 978-0-8018-9625-5.
- Allmand, Christopher (1992). Henry V. University of California Press. ISBN 978-0-4135-3280-0.
- Chrimes, S. B. (1980). "The Reign of Henry VI: Some Recent Contributions". Welsh History Review. 10 (1): 320–333. ISSN 0043-2431.
- Chrimes, S.B (11 July 1999). Henry VII. Yale University Press. ISBN 978-0-3002-1294-5.
- Earenfight, Theresa (2026). Queenship in Medieval Europe. Bloomsbury Academic. ISBN 9781350497924.
- Fritze, Ronald H.; Robison, William Baxter, eds. (1992). Historical Dictionary of Late Medieval England, 1272–1485. Greenwood Publishing Group. ISBN 978-0-3132-9124-1.
- Gibbon, Rachel (1996). "Isabeau of Bavaria, Queen of France (1385–1422): The Creation of an Historical Villainess: The Alexander Prize Essay". Transactions of the Royal Historical Society. 6: 51–63. doi:10.2307/3679229. JSTOR 3679229. S2CID 162409969.
- Griffiths, Ralph A.; Thomas, Roger S. (2005). The Making of the Tudor Dynasty. Sutton Publishing. ISBN 978-0-7509-3776-4.
- Haigh, Christopher, ed. (1985). The Cambridge Historical Encyclopedia of Great Britain and Ireland. Cambridge University Press. ISBN 9780521255592.
- Harvey, Barbara (2003). "The monks of Westminster and the old Lady chapel". In Tatton-Brown, Tim; Mortimer, Richard (eds.). Westminster Abbey: The Lady Chapel of Henry VII. The Boydell Press. p. 5-32. ISBN 978-1-8438-3037-5.
- Payne, Matthew (2023). "The lost Tudor". History Today. 73 (3) March: 62–67.
- Strickland, Agnes (2010). Lives of the Kings and Queens of England from the Norman Conquest. Cambridge: Cambridge University Press. ISBN 9780511736421.
- Williams, Neville; Fraser, Antonia, eds. (29 November 2000). The Tudors. University of California Press. ISBN 978-0-5202-2804-7.

Catherine of Valois House of Valois Cadet branch of the Capetian dynasty Born: 27 October 1401 Died: 3 January 1437
English royalty
Vacant Title last held by Joanna of Navarre	Queen consort of England; 2 June 1420 – 31 August 1422	Vacant Title next held by Margaret of Anjou
