= Edmund Tudor, 1st Earl of Richmond =

Anglo-Welsh nobleman (1430–1456)

Edmund Tudor
- Earl of Richmond
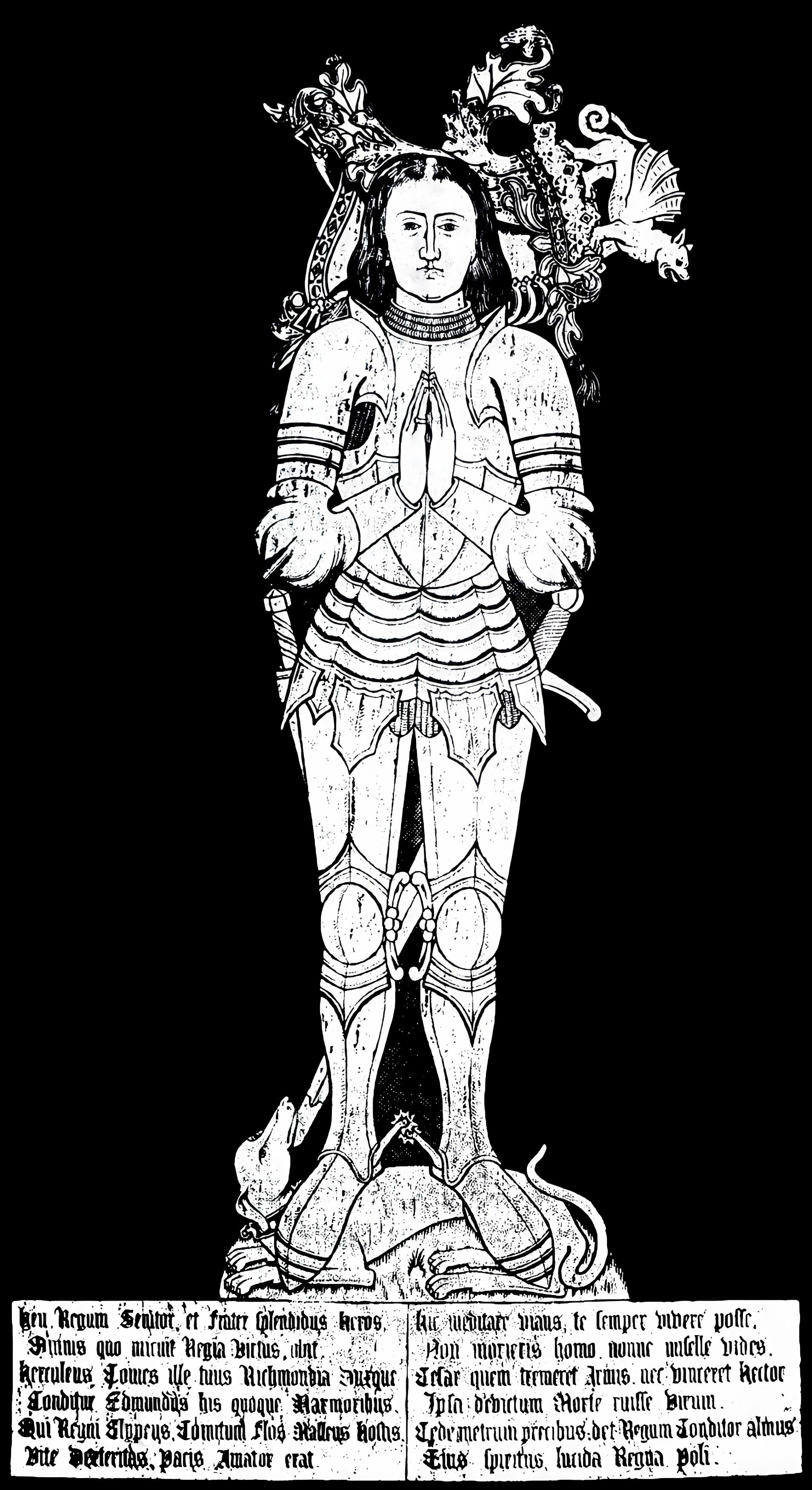
- Tomb Effigy of Edmund Tudor
- Born: c. 1430; Much Hadham Palace, Hertfordshire, England
- Died: 3 November 1456 (aged 26); Carmarthen Castle, Wales
- Buried: St David's Cathedral, Pembrokeshire
- Noble family: Tudor
- Spouse: Lady Margaret Beaufort (m. 1455)
- Issue: Henry VII of England
- Father: Owen Tudor
- Mother: Catherine of Valois

Edmund Tudor, 1st Earl of Richmond (c. 1430 – 3 November 1456), also known as Edmund of Hadham, was the father of King Henry VII of England and a member of the Tudor family of Penmynydd. Born to Sir Owen Tudor and Queen Dowager Catherine of Valois, Edmund was the half-brother of Henry VI of England. He was raised for several years by Katherine de la Pole, and Henry VI took an interest in Edmund's upbringing, granting him a title and lands once he came of age. Both Edmund and his brother, Jasper, were made advisers to the King, as they were his closest remaining blood relatives.

The brothers were created the senior earls in the kingdom and had influential positions in the Parliament of England. Edmund was also granted Baynard's Castle, London, and ran his estates successfully. He was married to Lady Margaret Beaufort, after her first marriage was annulled. Prior to the start of the Wars of the Roses, Edmund liaised with Richard, Duke of York, and even supported him when the King fell ill during 1453–1454. After war began in 1455, York sent Edmund to uphold the authority of the King in South Wales. While he was there, York was overthrown by the King and, in retaliation, Yorkist forces were sent to engage those of Tudor's in South Wales. Edmund was captured and imprisoned at Carmarthen Castle, where he died of the bubonic plague on 3 November 1456, three months before the birth of his son, the future Henry VII.

== Birth and early life ==
Following the death of Henry V of England, the Queen Dowager Catherine of Valois married the Welsh commoner Owen Tudor. The marriage took place in secret, and was not common knowledge until after Catherine's death. It is accepted that Catherine and Owen were married around 1429/30, as the Queen Dowager had stopped living in the household of her son Henry VI, and Owen was granted the rights of an Englishman in the Parliament of May 1432.

The children of Catherine and Owen were born away from court. Their first son, Edmund, was born at Much Hadham Palace, Hertfordshire, a manor house owned by the Bishop of London. In 1436, his mother retired to Bermondsey Abbey, where she died on 3 January 1437. With Catherine dead, the Queen Dowager's enemies moved against Owen. He was summoned to London, but was acquitted by the courts of charges relating to the marriage. While en route to Wales, he was arrested and imprisoned in Newgate Prison. After he escaped in early 1438, he was recaptured and imprisoned once more in Windsor Castle.

After the death of their mother and the subsequent imprisonment of their father, Edmund and his brother Jasper were brought up in the care of Katherine de la Pole, the daughter of Michael de la Pole, 2nd Earl of Suffolk, with whom they remained until at least March 1442. It was at that point that Henry VI began to take an interest in his half-brothers; he ensured that they were placed in the care of priests who oversaw their education. Edmund, and his brother and father, were taken into Henry VI's household. Henry VI was seemingly fond of his half brothers, and ennobled each of them: Edmund was created Earl of Richmond on 15 December 1449, and Jasper Earl of Pembroke on 23 November 1452.

== Earl of Richmond ==
Coat of arms of Edmund Tudor, first Earl of Richmond

As earls and half-brothers of the king, Edmund and Jasper took precedence over all other non-clerics in the court, with the exception of the dukes. They were each given lands, although Jasper received a yearly stipend until Pembroke became available. After seven years of marriage to Margaret of Anjou, Henry VI was still childless. After the death of Humphrey, Duke of Gloucester, the royal line was at risk, and the Tudor brothers were considered as possible though unlikely heirs - they were of French royal descent through their mother, but had no blood relation to the English throne.

By 1452, Edmund and Jasper were both among Henry VI's small group of personal advisers; they were the only blood relations in court. However, neither was skilled at matters of state within England, and instead they were primarily given the task of maintaining the authority of the king within Wales. This resulted in a long-held affection for the family in their native country. The formal investiture of the duo took place in the Tower of London on 5 January 1453. Later that year on 6 March, they took their seats in the Parliament of England ahead of all the other earls in the court. After a petition by the House of Commons of England, both Jasper and Edmund were recognised officially as legitimate half-brothers of the king and the statutory disabilities associated with being considered Welsh were removed. In 1452 and 1453, Henry VI gave them large monetary grants, and also gave Edmund property in Westmorland and Lancashire. Edmund ran a profitable estate and invested in the wool industry based in Boston, Lincolnshire. Henry VI also granted him the medieval palace of Baynard's Castle, near to the River Thames in London.

== Wars of the Roses and marriage ==
In the summer of 1453, Henry VI had been suffering from an unknown illness which lasted over 17 months. Several parties sought to take power during this period. Henry VI's wife, Margaret of Anjou, demanded to be declared regent. The Tudor brothers supported Richard of York, a leading claimant to the English throne, who sought to become Protector of the Realm. However, Edmund did not attend the Parliament of 3 April 1454 where York was named protector. Edmund did attend York's council of advisors, although not as frequently as Jasper. Both brothers were in attendance in November 1454, when the council reduced the size of the royal household. As a result, they each received an entourage of a chaplain, two esquires, two yeomen and two chamberlains.

Henry VI recovered around Christmas of 1454, and dismissed York, with resultant hostility. This left the Tudor brothers in a quandary. Edmund was not at the First Battle of St Albans on 22 May 1455, where Henry VI was captured by Richard of York. Both brothers attended the following Parliament where York was once again named Protector. While York cancelled the majority of the grants Henry VI had made during his reign, those to Edmund and Jasper were exempt. Both brothers were absent when the second session of Parliament that year began on 12 November; Edmund had been sent to Wales to put down the rebellion of Gruffudd ap Nicolas.

Margaret Beaufort was the daughter and only child of John Beaufort, 1st Duke of Somerset. Through her father, she also was a great-granddaughter of John of Gaunt. As such she carried a claim to the throne. Thus she was married as a child to John de la Pole, son of the ambitious Duke of Suffolk. However, the Duke was murdered in 1450.

In early 1453, the marriage of Margaret and John was annulled, and on 24 March Edmund was given wardship of Margaret, still only nine years old. Edmund married Margaret on 1 November 1455 at Bletsoe Castle. It was through Margaret that Edmund's son could claim the English throne.

The marriage was consummated much sooner than custom expected. When Edmund died in 1456, he left a 13-year-old widow who was seven months pregnant with their child, Henry Tudor.

== Capture, captivity and death ==
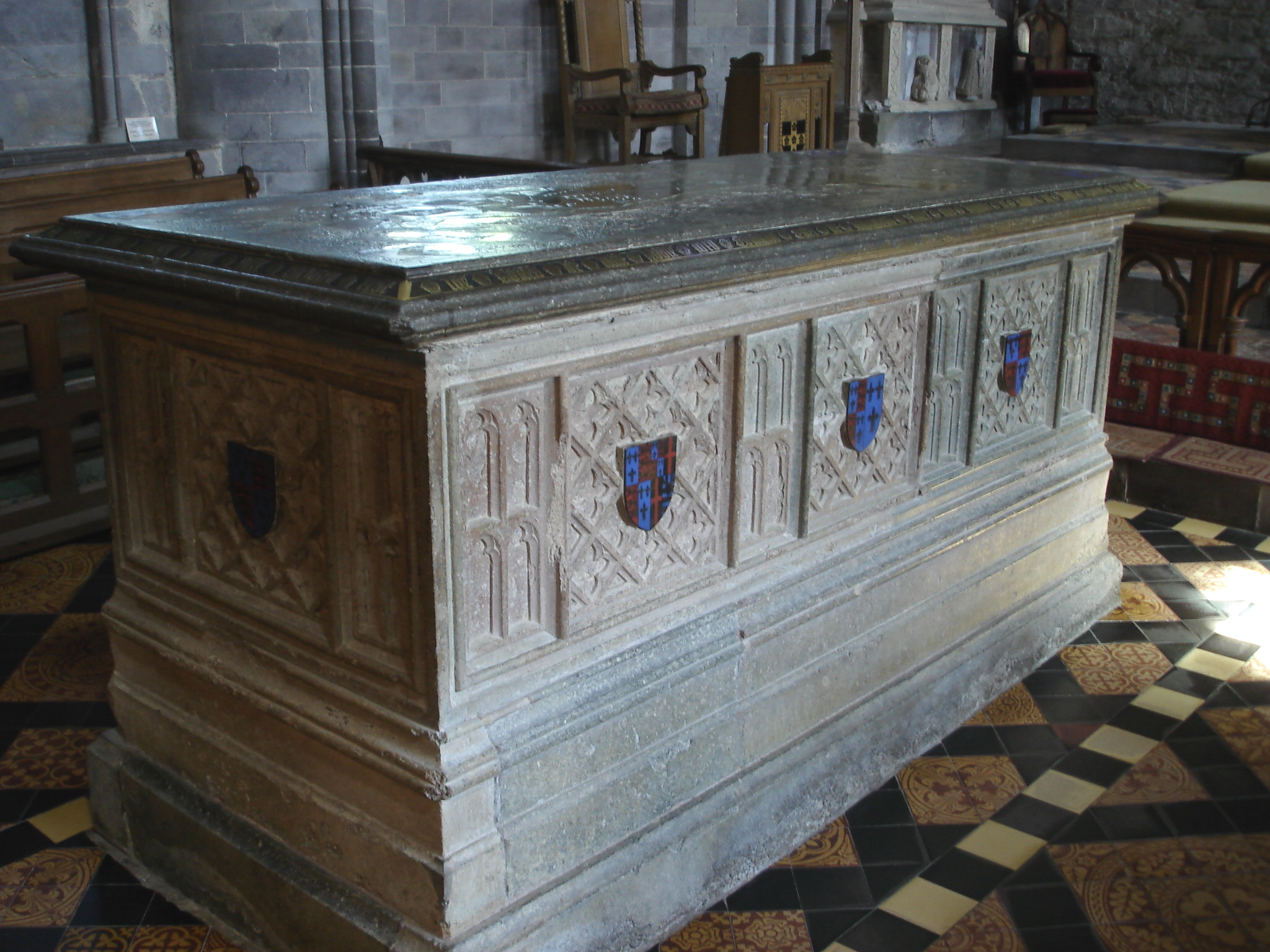
Tomb of Edmund Tudor, St David's Cathedral, Pembrokeshire

Gruffudd made war with the troops under Edmund, capturing the castles at Aberystwyth, Carmarthen and Carreg Cennen by June 1456. The rebellion didn't last long, and by early August, Edmund's forces had retaken those castles although minor skirmishes continued for several months longer. While Edmund was in Wales, the King had deposed York. In retaliation, York sent 2,000 men under William Herbert on 10 August to take South Wales. When they arrived at Carmarthen Castle, they took the stronghold and captured Edmund Tudor.

As Herbert's troops moved on to Aberystwyth, Edmund was left behind, imprisoned in Carmarthen Castle. On 3 November 1456, Edmund died there, having been infected with the bubonic plague. He was buried at the nearby Franciscan Church in Carmarthen. There were suspicions that Edmund may have been murdered, and so a trial was held several months later with several parties accused, but no one was found guilty. Edmund's remains were removed to the choir of St David's Cathedral, Pembrokeshire, in 1539, due to the dissolution of the monasteries enacted by his grandson, King Henry VIII of England of the Royal House of Tudor.

== Ancestry ==
Ancestors of Edmund Tudor, 1st Earl of Richmond

8. Tudur ap Goronwy
4. Maredudd ap Tudur
9. Marged ferch Tomos
2. Sir Owen Tudor
10. Dafydd Fychan ap Dafydd Llwyd
5. Margaret ferch Dafydd
1. Edmund Tudor, 1st Earl of Richmond
12. Charles V of France
6. Charles VI of France
13. Joanna of Bourbon
3. Catherine of Valois
14. Stephen III, Duke of Bavaria
7. Isabeau of Bavaria
15. Taddea Visconti

== Notes ==
Peerage of England
New creation Last held by John of Lancaster	Earl of Richmond; 1449 –1456	Succeeded by Henry Tudor
