= Owen Tudor =

Welsh courtier and soldier (c.1400–1461)

Sir Owen Tudor
- Arms of Owen Tudor
- Full name: Owen ap Maredudd ap Tudur
- Born: c. 1400; Anglesey, Wales
- Died: 2 February 1461
- Buried: Greyfriars Church, Hereford, Herefordshire
- Noble family: Tudor
- Spouse: Catherine of Valois (m. 1428; died 1437)
- Issue: Edmund Tudor, 1st Earl of Richmond; Jasper Tudor, Duke of Bedford; Edward Tudor (disputed); Catherine or Margaret Tudor (disputed); Sir David Owen (illegitimate)
- Father: Maredudd ap Tudur
- Mother: Margaret ferch Dafydd

Sir Owen Tudor (Welsh: Owain ap Maredudd ap Tudur, (Note: Tudur is sometimes given as Tewdwr, an etymologically unrelated name, see House of Tudor § Ascent to the throne for details.) c. 1400 – 2 February 1461) was a Welsh courtier and the second husband of Queen Catherine of Valois (1401–1437), widow of King Henry V of England. He was the paternal grandfather of Henry VII, founder of the Tudor dynasty.

== Background ==
Owen was a descendant of a prominent family from Penmynydd on the Isle of Anglesey, which traces its lineage back to Ednyfed Fychan (d. 1246), a Welsh official and seneschal to the Kingdom of Gwynedd. Tudor's grandfather, Tudur ap Goronwy, married Margaret, daughter of Thomas ap Llywelyn ab Owain of Cardiganshire, the last male of the senior branch of the princely house of Deheubarth. Margaret's elder sister married Gruffudd Fychan of Glyndyfrdwy, whose son was Owain Glyndŵr. Owen's father, Maredudd ap Tudur, and his uncles were prominent in Owain Glyndŵr's revolt against English rule, the Glyndŵr Rising.

Historians consider the descendants of Ednyfed Fychan, including Owen Tudor, one of the most powerful families in 13th to 14th-century Wales. The descendants of his many sons would form a wealthy 'ministerial aristocracy', acting as leading servants to the princes of Gwynedd, and play a key role in the attempts to create a single Welsh principality. This privilege endured after the Conquest of Wales by Edward I with the family continuing to exercise power in the name of the king of England, within Wales. However, there remained an awareness of the family's Welsh heritage and the accompanying loyalties led them to take part in the suppressed Glyndŵr Rising.

== Early life ==
The fact that little is known about Tudor's early life and that it has instead become largely mythologized is attributed to his family's part in the Glyndŵr Rising. At various times, it has been said that he was the bastard son of an alehouse keeper, that his father was a fugitive murderer, that he fought at Agincourt, that he was keeper of Queen Catherine's household or wardrobe, that he was an esquire of Henry V, and that his relationship with Catherine began when he fell into the queen's lap while dancing or caught the queen's eye when swimming.

The sixteenth-century Welsh chronicler Elis Gruffydd noted that he was her sewer (someone who places dishes on the table and tastes them) and servant. However, it is known that after the Glyndŵr Rising, several Welshmen secured positions at court, and in May 1421, an 'Owen Meredith' joined the retinue of Sir Walter Hungerford, 1st Baron Hungerford, the steward of the king's household from 1415 until 1421.

== Marriage to Catherine of Valois ==
Henry V of England died on 31 August 1422, leaving his wife, Queen Catherine, widowed. The dowager queen initially lived with her infant son, King Henry VI, before moving to Wallingford Castle early in his reign.

Catherine was rumoured to have had an affair with Edmund Beaufort, 2nd Duke of Somerset. The rumours, though based on questionable evidence, prompted a response from her son's regents, who objected to Somerset as a possible husband as he was a first cousin of Henry V through the legitimised Beaufort line sired by John of Gaunt. A parliamentary statute regulating the remarriage of widowed queens was passed by the conciliary government. She subsequently married Owen Tudor by whom she had issue, including at least two sons possibly a third son and a daughter whose existences are disputed:

=== Legitimate issue ===
- Edmund Tudor, 1st Earl of Richmond (c.1430 – 1 November 1456) born at either Much Hadham Palace in Hertfordshire or at Hadham in Bedfordshire. He gained the title Earl of Richmond in 1452 and in 1455, aged 25, married 12 year-old Lady Margaret Beaufort by whom he was the father of King Henry VII, the first monarch of the Tudor dynasty. In 1456 he died of plague in Carmarthen, three months before the birth of his son at Pembroke Castle. The historian G. L. Harriss suggested that the affair with Beaufort resulted in the birth of Edmund Tudor. Harriss wrote, "By its very nature the evidence for Edmund Tudor's parentage is less than conclusive, but such facts, as can be assembled, permit an agreeable possibility that Edmund 'Tudor' and Margaret Beaufort were first cousins and that the royal house of 'Tudor' sprang in fact from Beauforts on both sides."
- Jasper Tudor, Duke of Bedford (c.November 1431 – 26 December 1495) was born at Hatfield. He gained the title of Earl of Pembroke in 1452 but was branded as a traitor in 1461. However, he became the 1st Duke of Bedford in 1485. He was the second husband of Catherine Woodville, widow of the Duke of Buckingham and sister of Elizabeth Woodville, wife of Edward IV. They had no issue.
- Edward (or Owen) Tudor. Very little is known of this child's life. The Tudor historian Polydore Vergil stated this child, whom he did not name, became "a monk of the order of St. Benet, and lived not long after". William Camden referred to this child as Edward Tudor, and indicated that he lies buried in the chapel of St Blaise in Westminster Abbey, near the tomb of Abbot Nicholas Litlington. Even so, he is called Owen Tudor in most published sources, the reasons for which are not clear. The modern historian Pearce has shown, however, that no monk named either Edward or Owen Tudor existed at Westminster Abbey in this time period. An alternative theory advanced by Pearce is that Edward Tudor is the same person as Edward Bridgewater, a known monk at Westminster Abbey, who died c.1471. This theory appears to be groundless. Another theory, based on the archives of Westminster Abbey, equates him with a monk called Edward Hertford.
- Catherine (or Margaret) Tudor, who according to Polydore Vergil became a nun, although no other source corroborates this.

== Illegitimate issue ==
Owen Tudor had at least one illegitimate child, by an unknown mistress:

- Sir David Owen (Pembroke Castle, 1459-1535). He later acquired Southwick Court in Wiltshire before marrying. He married firstly Mary de Bohun, an heiress who brought with her the Cowdray estate in Sussex, daughter of Sir John de Bohun of Midhurst and wife Anne Arden. His second marriage was to Anne Blount, daughter of Sir William Blount and wife Margaret Etchingham. He married thirdly Anne Devereux, presumably for being a daughter of John Devereux, 9th Baron Ferrers of Chartley, and wife Cecily Bourchier. He is buried in the priory church of Easebourne, near Midhurst. He had four children by first marriage.

== Life after Catherine's death ==
Following Queen Catherine's death, Owen Tudor lost the protection from the statute on dowager queens' remarriage and was imprisoned in Newgate Prison. In 1438, he escaped but was later recaptured and held in the custody of the constable of Windsor Castle.

In 1439, Henry VI of England granted him a general pardon, restoring his goods and lands. In addition, Henry VI granted him a pension of £40 per annum, provided him with a position in court, and appointed him the Keeper of the King's Parks in Denbigh. In 1442, Henry VI welcomed his two half-brothers, Edmund and Jasper, to court. In November 1452, they were created Earls of Richmond and Pembroke respectively with the acknowledgement that they were the king's half-brothers.

In 1459, Tudor's pension was increased to £100 per annum. Owen and his son Jasper (Edmund having died in 1456) were commissioned to arrest a servant of John Dwnn of Kidwelly, a Yorkist, and later that year, Tudor acquired an interest in the forfeited estates of another Yorkist, John, Lord Clinton. On 5 February 1460, Tudor and Jasper were granted life offices in the Duke of York's lordship of Denbigh, a prelude to them later seizing the lordship.

== Death ==
Owen Tudor was an early casualty of the Wars of the Roses (1455–1487) between the House of Lancaster and the House of York. He joined his son Jasper's army as Lancastrian relations and partisans in Wales in January 1461, a force that was defeated at the Battle of Mortimer's Cross by Edward of York. On 2 February, Owen Tudor was captured and beheaded at Hereford. His head was placed on the market cross there, "and a madde woman kembyd hys here and wysche a way the blode of hys face" ("and a mad woman combed his hair and washed away the blood of his face") and set 100 candles about him.

Owen Tudor had expected to be imprisoned, rather than executed. Moments before his execution, he realised that he was to die and murmured "that hede shalle ly on the stocke that wass wonte to ly on Quene Katheryns lappe" ("that head shall lie on the stock that was wont to lie on Queen Catherine's lap"). His body was buried in a chapel on the north side of the Greyfriars' Church in Hereford. He had no memorial until his illegitimate son, David, paid for a tomb before the friary was dissolved.

== Ancestry ==
Owen was a descendant of Rhys ap Gruffydd (1132–1197), ruler of the kingdom of Deheubarth, via the lineages that follow:

Rhys had a daughter, Gwenllian ferch (daughter of) Rhys, who married Ednyfed Fychan, Seneschal of the Kingdom of Gwynedd (d. 1246).

Ednyfed Fychan and Gwenllian ferch Rhys were the parents of Goronwy ab Ednyfed, Lord of Tref-gastell (d. 1268). Goronwy was married to Morfydd ferch Meurig, daughter of Meurig of Gwent. Meurig was the son of Ithel, grandson of Rhydd and great-grandson of Iestyn ap Gwrgant, the last king of Morgannwg (reigned 1081–1091) before its conquest by the Normans.

Goronwy and Morfydd were parents of Tudur Hen, Lord of Penmynydd (d. 1311). Tudur Hen married Angharad ferch Ithel Fychan, daughter of Ithel Fychan ap Ithel Gan, Lord of Englefield. They were the parents of Goronwy ap Tudur Hen, Lord of Penmynydd (d. 1331).

Goronwy ap Tudur was married to Gwerfyl ferch Madog, daughter of Madog ap Dafydd, Baron of Hendwr. They were the parents of Tudur ap Goronwy, also known as Tudur Fychan ("Tudur the Little") to distinguish him from his grandfather Tudur Hen ("Tudur the Old"), Lord of Penmynydd (d. 1367).

Tudur Fychan married Margaret ferch Thomas of Is Coed, of the native and Ancient Royal Houses of Wales. Margaret and her sisters, Ellen and Eleanor, were descended from Angharad ferch Llywelyn, daughter of Llywelyn the Great.

Tudur and Margaret were parents to Maredudd ap Tudur (died 1406). Maredudd married Margaret ferch Dafydd, the daughter of Dafydd Fychan, Lord of Anglesey, and his wife, Nest ferch Ieuan.

Maredudd ap Tudur and Margaret ferch Dafydd were the parents of Owen Tudor.

The Penmynydd family and their relatives
Disteiniaid of the Kingdom of Gwynedd Members of the Penmynydd family Members of the House of Tudor

Tangwystl ferch Llywarch	Ednyfed Fychan d. 1246	Gwenllian ferch Rhys d. 1236	Einion ap Gwalchmai fl. 1202–1223
Llywelyn ab Ednyfed	Tudur ab Ednyfed d. c. 1281	Gruffudd ab Ednyfed Fychan d. c. 1256	Goronwy ab Ednyfed Fychan d. 1268	Angharad ferch Ednyfed	Einion Fychan ab Einion
Rhys ap Llywelyn	Heilin ap Tudur fl. 1246–1282	Rhys Hen ap Gruffudd d. 1284	Tudur Hen ap Goronwy d. 1311	Dafydd ab Einion Fychan d. c. 1282
Gwilym ap Rhys	Gruffudd ap Heilin d. c. 1340	Gruffudd Llwyd ap Rhys d. 1335	Goronwy ap Tudur Hen d. 1331	Tomos ap Llewelyn d. 1343
Ardudful ferch Gwilym	Gwilym ap Gruffudd d. c. 1370	Hywel ap Goronwy d. c. 1367	Tudur ap Goronwy d. c. 1367	Marged ferch Tomos	Elen ferch Tomos	Gruffudd Fychan II
Dafydd Llwyd ap Gwilym Gam d. c. 1350–1380	Gruffudd ap Gwilym d. 1405	Goronwy Fychan ap Tudur d. 1382	Rhys ap Tudur executed 1412	Ednyfed ap Tudur d. 1382	Gwilym ap Tudur d. 1413	Maredudd ap Tudur d. 1406	Owain Glyndŵr d. c. 1416
Gwilym ap Gruffudd d. 1431	Morfudd ferch Goronwy	Owen Tudor c. 1400–1461
Tudur Fychan	Edmund Tudor c. 1430–1456; 1st Earl of Richmond	Jasper Tudor, Duke of Bedford; 1431–1495	David Owen
Owain ap Tudur d. 1504/1505	Henry VII; 1457–1509; King of England
William ab Owain d. 1523?	John ab Owain	Richard ab Owain d. 1527 (?)	Arthur; 1486–1502; Prince of Wales	Henry VIII; 1491–1547; King of England
Richard Owen d. 1558	William Bold	Edward VI; 1537–1553; King of England	Mary I 1516–1558; Queen of England	Elizabeth I 1533–1603; Queen of England
Richard Owen Theodor (III)	David Owen Theodor d. 1624
Richard Owen Theodor (IV) fl. 1645
Richard Owen Theodor (V) fl. 1665
Richard Owen Theodor (VI) fl. 1669
