= St Gredifael's Church, Penmynydd =

Former church in Anglesey, Wales

Coordinates: 53.2510°N 4.2240°W

St Gredifael's Church
- St Gredifael's Church
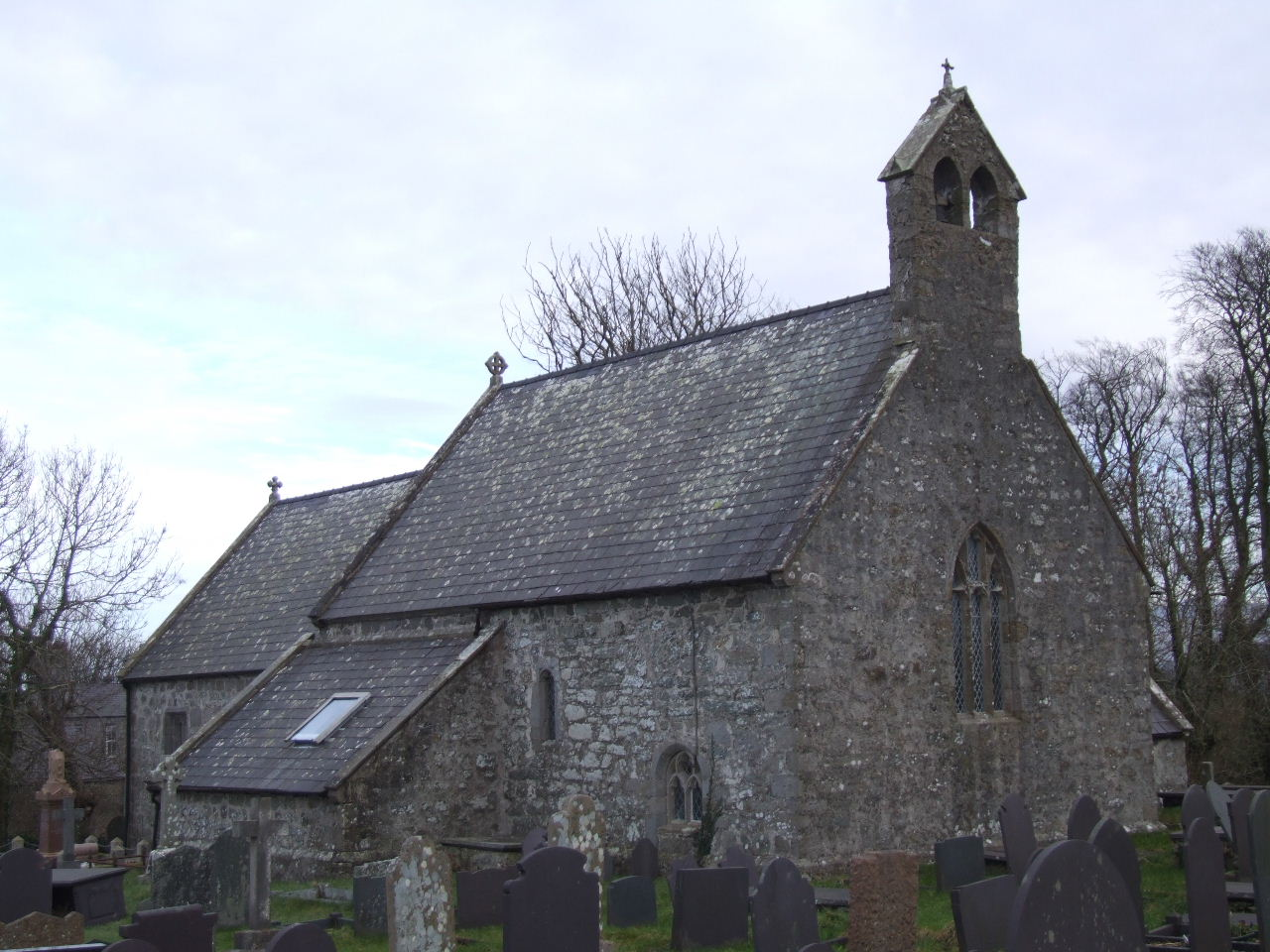
- St Gredifael's Church
- Denomination: Church in Wales
- Previous denomination: Roman Catholic; Church of England

History
- Founder: St Gredifael
- Dedication: St Gredifael

Architecture
- Functional status: Closed
- Heritage designation: Grade II*
- Designated: 1968
- Years built: 6th century

Administration
- Diocese: Diocese of Bangor
- Parish: Penmynydd

St Gredifael's Church is a former Church in Wales parish church in Penmynydd, Anglesey, Wales. The church was originally constructed in the 6th century by St Gredifael for whom it was named with the current stone building being constructed in the 12th century. The church holds the tomb of Goronwy Fychan ap Tudur, a member of the Tudors of Penmynydd and relative of the Tudor Kings of England. It is a grade II* listed building.

== History ==
The church was first constructed on the site in the 6th century AD by Saint Gredifael with a more substantial stone building being constructed later in the 12th century. The church was later reconstructed in the 14th century, with the nave and chancel being built using Norman carved stone. The church was extended in the early 15th century with the inclusion of a new north chapel (which later became known as the Tudor chapel) and new porch on the south side. Restoration work was later carried out in 1848 and again in 1969 to repair the upper sections of the walls. In 2010, there were concerns that the church would close due to being unable to afford necessary repairs. However the church was awarded a financial grant from the Welsh Assembly to allow for the repairs to be carried out and the church to remain open. The church has since closed.

The church was granted grade II* listed status in 1968. The reason for it being listed was because it was a "...as a scarcely restored medieval rural church housing an exceptionally fine late C14 alabaster effigy tomb." It also stated that "the church is of immense local and national historic interest for its connection with the Tudor family of Plas Penmynydd."

== Tudor Family ==
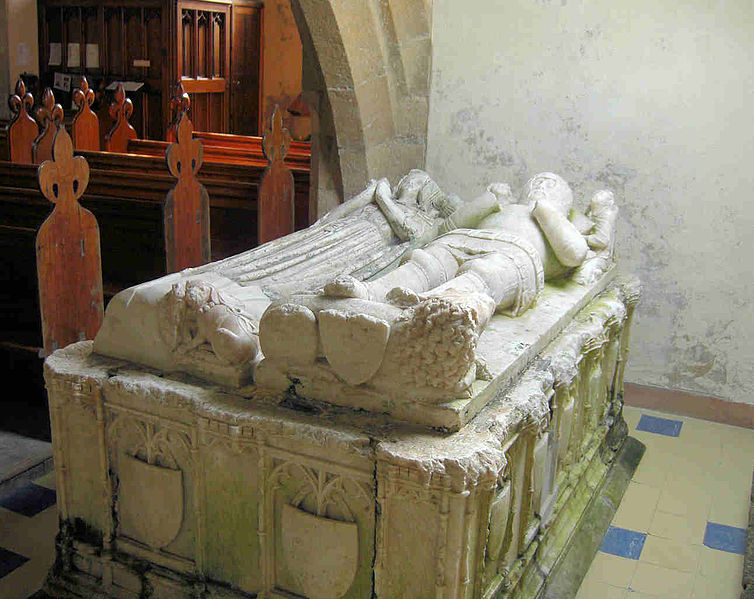
The tomb of Goronwy ap Tudur and Myfanwy Fychan

The church is closely linked to the House of Tudor as it is located in the village where the dynasty was founded. Inside the church in the north chapel is the alabaster tomb of Goronwy Fychan ap Tudur, the great-uncle of Henry VII of England of the House of Tudor alongside his wife Myfanwy Fychan. His tomb was not originally installed at St Gredifael's Church. However, it was moved there from Llanfaes Friary following the Church of England Dissolution of the Monasteries by his successor Henry VIII of England. The tombs themselves are damaged from vandalism due to pilgrims taking chips off them because of a belief that the tombs materials had healing properties. As a result of this, the effigy of Goronwy on the top of his tomb is missing its hands and the effigy on top of Mfanwy's tomb is missing its fingers.

The interior design pays tribute to the Tudor lineage with Tudor Roses in the stained glass windows alongside a portcullis representing the House of Beaufort. The window has the motto "UNDEB FEL RHOSYN YW AR LAN AFONYDD AC FEL TY DUR AR BEN Y MYNYDDD" (Unity is like a rose on a river bank and like a house of steel on top of a mountain) on it and fleur de lys on the ends of the pews in reference to Catherine of Valois, wife of Owen Tudor and the Tudor claim to the French throne. In 2007, the church was visited by the House of Tudor's descendant and heir to the throne of the United Kingdom, Charles, Prince of Wales.
