= House of Tudor =

English royal house of Welsh origin (r. 1485–1603)

- Tudor rose
- Parent house: Penmynydd family
- Country: Kingdom of England; Kingdom of Ireland; Principality of Wales
- Founded: 22 August 1485; 541 years ago
- Founder: Ednyfed Fychan (progenitor); Henry VII (first king of England)
- Final ruler: Elizabeth I
- Titles: List: King of England; King of Ireland; King of France (claim); Lord of Ireland; Queen of Scotland; Queen consort of Spain; Queen of France; Queen consort of Naples; Princesses of Asturias by marriage; Prince of Wales; Dukes of Milan; Dukes of Brabant; Duke of Bedford; Duke of Cornwall; Duke of York; Duke of Somerset; Duke of Richmond; Counts of Burgundy; Counts of Habsburg; Counts of Flanders; Counts of Tyrol; Earl of Pembroke; Earl of Richmond; Earl of Surrey; Earl of Nottingham; Earl of Lincoln
- Dissolution: 24 March 1603

The House of Tudor (/ˈtjuː.dər/, TEW-dər) was an English and Welsh dynasty that held the throne of England from 1485 to 1603. They descended ultimately from Ednyfed Fychan and the Penmynydd family, a Welsh noble family, and Catherine of Valois. The Tudor monarchs were also descended from the House of Lancaster. They ruled the Kingdom of England and the Lordship of Ireland (later the Kingdom of Ireland) for 118 years with five monarchs: Henry VII, Henry VIII, Edward VI, Mary I and Elizabeth I. The Tudors succeeded the House of Plantagenet as rulers of the Kingdom of England, and were succeeded by the Scottish House of Stuart. The first Tudor monarch, Henry VII, was descended through his mother from the House of Beaufort, a legitimised branch of the English royal House of Lancaster, a cadet house of the Plantagenets. The Penmynydd family came to power and started the Tudor period in the wake of the Wars of the Roses (1455–1487), which had resulted in the main House of Lancaster (with which the Tudors were aligned) becoming extinct in the male line.

Henry VII (a descendant of Edward III, and the son of Edmund Tudor, a half-brother of Henry VI) succeeded in presenting himself as a candidate not only for traditional Lancastrian supporters, but also for discontented supporters of their rival Plantagenet cadet House of York, and he took the throne by right of conquest. Following his victory at the Battle of Bosworth Field (22 August 1485), he reinforced his position in 1486 by fulfilling his 1483 vow to marry Elizabeth of York, daughter of King Edward IV and the heiress of the Yorkist claim to the throne, thus symbolically uniting the former warring factions of Lancaster and York under the new dynasty (represented by the Tudor rose). The Tudors extended their power beyond the boundaries of modern England, achieving the full union of England and the Principality of Wales in 1542 (Laws in Wales Acts 1535 and 1542), and successfully asserting English authority over the Kingdom of Ireland (proclaimed by the Crown of Ireland Act 1542). They also maintained the nominal English claim to the Kingdom of France; although none of them pressed the matter. Henry VIII waged wars against France primarily as a result of international alliances. After Henry's death, his daughter Mary I permanently lost control of all territory in France as a result of the Siege of Calais in 1558.

The Tudor monarchs ruled England for a total of 118 years. Henry VIII (r. 1509–1547) was the only son of Henry VII and Elizabeth of York to live to the age of maturity, and he proved a dominant ruler. Issues around royal succession (including marriage and the succession rights of women) became major political themes during the Tudor era, as did the English Reformation in religion, impacting the future of the Crown. Elizabeth I was the longest serving Tudor monarch at 44 years, and her reign—known as the Elizabethan era—provided a period of stability after the short, troubled reigns of her siblings. When Elizabeth I died childless, her cousin of the Scottish House of Stuart succeeded her, in the Union of the Crowns of 24 March 1603. The first Stuart to become King of England (r. 1603–1625), James VI and I, was a great-grandson of Henry VII's daughter Margaret (Tudor) Queen of Scots, who in 1503 had married James IV of Scotland in accordance with the 1502 Treaty of Perpetual Peace. A connection persists to the present 21st century, as Charles III is a ninth-generation descendant of George I, who in turn was James VI and I's great-grandson.

== Ascent to the throne ==
The Tudors descended from King Edward III on Henry VII's mother's side from John Beaufort, 1st Earl of Somerset, one of the illegitimate children of the 14th century English prince John of Gaunt, the third surviving son of Edward III. Beaufort's mother was Gaunt's long-term mistress, Katherine Swynford.

The descendants of an illegitimate child of English royalty would normally have no claim on the throne, although Gaunt and Swynford eventually married in 1396, when John Beaufort was 25. The church then retroactively declared the Beauforts legitimate by way of a papal bull the same year, confirmed by a proclamation read in Parliament in 1397. A subsequent proclamation by John of Gaunt's son by his first wife Blanche of Lancaster, King Henry IV, also recognised the Beauforts' legitimacy but declared the line ineligible for the throne.

Nevertheless, the Beauforts remained closely allied with Gaunt's descendants from his first marriage, the House of Lancaster, during the civil wars known as the Wars of the Roses. However the descent from the Beauforts did not necessarily render Henry Tudor (Henry VII) heir to the throne, nor did the fact that his paternal grandmother, Catherine of Valois, had been Queen of England due to her first marriage to Henry V (although, this did make Henry VII a nephew of Henry VI).

The legitimate claim was that of Henry Tudor's wife, Elizabeth of York, as daughter to Edward IV, and descendant of the second son of Edward III, Lionel of Antwerp, Duke of Clarence, and also his fourth son, Edmund of Langley, 1st Duke of York. As she had no surviving brothers, Elizabeth had the strongest claim to the crown as de facto heiress of the House of York, but while she became queen consort, she did not rule as queen regnant; for the last attempt a female made at ruling in her own right had resulted in disaster when Henry II's mother, Empress Matilda, and her cousin, Stephen of Blois, fought bitterly for the throne in the 12th century.

=== Family connections and the Wars of the Roses ===
English royal families in the Wars of the Roses

Dukes (except Aquitaine) and Princes of Wales are noted, as are the monarchs' reigns.
†=Killed in action; =Executed
See also Family tree of English monarchs

Henry of Grosmont; Duke of Lancaster	Edward III; King of England r. 1327–1377
Edward of Woodstock "The Black Prince"; Prince of Wales	Thomas of Woodstock; Duke of Gloucester	Blanche of Lancaster	John of Gaunt; Duke of Lancaster	Katherine Swynford	Edmund of Langley; Duke of York	Lionel of Antwerp; Duke of Clarence
Edward of Angoulême	Richard II; Prince of Wales, King of England r. 1377–1399	Henry IV; Duke of Lancaster, King of England r. 1399–1413	John Beaufort	Thomas Beaufort; Duke of Exeter	Joan Beaufort	Ralph Neville	Philippa of Clarence
Owen Tudor; Lancastrian	Catherine of Valois	Henry V Duke of Lancaster, Prince of Wales, King of England r. 1413–1422	Humphrey; Duke of Gloucester	Henry Percy "Hotspur"	Elizabeth Mortimer	Roger Mortimer
Edward of Norwich; Duke of York	Richard of Conisburgh	Anne de Mortimer
John Beaufort; Duke of Somerset; Lancastrian	Margaret of Anjou; Lancastrian	Henry VI; King of England r. 1422–1461, r. 1470–1471; Lancastrian	Edmund Beaufort; Duke of Somerset; Lancastrian †1st St Albans	William Neville; Yorkist	Anne Neville	Henry Percy; Lancastrian †1st St Albans	Eleanor Neville	Richard Neville; Yorkist; (executed) Wakefield	Cecily Neville	Richard of York; Duke of York, Prince of Wales; Yorkist †Wakefield
Henry Beaufort; Duke of Somerset; Lancastrian; (executed) Hexham	Richard Woodville; (executed) Edgecote	Edmund Beaufort; Duke of Somerset; Lancastrian; (executed) Tewkesbury	Margaret Beaufort	Humphrey Stafford	Henry Percy; Lancastrian †Towton	John Neville; Yorkist, then Lancastrian †Barnet	Richard Neville "Kingmaker"; Yorkist, then Lancastrian †Barnet
Margaret Beaufort; Lancastrian	Edmund Tudor; Lancastrian	Jasper Tudor; Duke of Bedford; Lancastrian	Catherine Woodville	Henry Stafford; Duke of Buckingham; Yorkist, then Lancastrian (executed)	Elizabeth Woodville	Edward IV; Duke of York, King of England r. 1461–1470, r. 1471–1483; Yorkist	George Plantagenet; Duke of Clarence; Yorkist, then Lancastrian; (executed) Tower	Edward of Westminster; Prince of Wales; Lancastrian †Tewkesbury	Anne Neville	Richard III; Duke of Gloucester, King of England r. 1483–1485; Yorkist †Bosworth Field
Henry VII; King of England; Lancastrian r. 1485–1509	Elizabeth of York	Edward V Prince of Wales, King of England r. 1483; Yorkist; (executed) Tower	Richard of Shrewsbury; Duke of York; (executed) Tower

Henry Tudor had, however, something that the others did not. He had an army which defeated the last Yorkist king, Richard III, in the field of battle and the support of powerful nobles to take the crown by right of conquest. Richard III's accession to the throne had proved controversial, even among the Yorkists.

Henry Tudor, as Henry VII, and his son by Elizabeth of York, Henry VIII eliminated other claimants to the throne, including his first cousin once removed, Margaret Pole, Countess of Salisbury, and her son Henry Pole, 1st Baron Montagu, as well as Henry Courtenay, 1st Marquess of Exeter.

On 1 November 1455, John Beaufort's granddaughter, Margaret Beaufort, married Henry VI's maternal half-brother Edmund Tudor, 1st Earl of Richmond. It was his father, Owen Tudor (Welsh: Owain ap Maredudd ap Tudur ap Goronwy ap Tudur ap Goronwy ap Ednyfed Fychan), who abandoned the Welsh patronymic naming practice and adopted a fixed surname. When he did, he did not choose, as was generally the custom, his father's name, Maredudd, but chose that of his grandfather, Tudur ap Goronwy, instead.

This name is sometimes given as Tewdwr, the Welsh form of Theodore, but Modern Welsh Tudur, Old Welsh Tutir is originally not a variant but a different and completely unrelated name, etymologically identical with Gaulish Toutorix, from Proto-Celtic *toutā "people, tribe" and *rīxs "king" (compare Modern Welsh tud "territory" and rhi "king" respectively), corresponding to Germanic Theodoric.

Owen Tudor was one of the bodyguards for the queen dowager Catherine of Valois, whose husband, Henry V, had died in 1422. Evidence suggests that the two were secretly married in 1428. Two sons born of the marriage, Edmund and Jasper, were among the most loyal supporters of the House of Lancaster in its struggle against the House of York.

Henry VI ennobled his half-brothers: Edmund became Earl of Richmond on 15 December 1449 and was married to Lady Margaret Beaufort, the great-granddaughter of John of Gaunt, the progenitor of the house of Lancaster; Jasper became Earl of Pembroke on 23 November 1452. Edmund died on 3 November 1456. On 28 January 1457, his widow Margaret, who was only 13 at the time, gave birth to a son, Henry Tudor, at her brother-in-law's residence at Pembroke Castle.

Henry Tudor, the future Henry VII, spent his childhood at Raglan Castle, the home of Lord Herbert, a leading Yorkist. Following the murder of Henry VI and death of his son, Edward, at the Battle of Tewkesbury in 1471, Henry became the person upon whom the Lancastrian cause rested. Concerned for his young nephew's life, Jasper Tudor took Henry to Brittany for safety.

Lady Margaret remained in England and remarried, living quietly while advancing the Lancastrian (and her son's) cause. Capitalizing on the growing unpopularity of Richard III (King of England from 1483), she was able to forge an alliance with discontented Yorkists in support of her son. Two years after Richard III was crowned, Henry and Jasper sailed from the mouth of the Seine to the Milford Haven Waterway and defeated Richard III at the Battle of Bosworth Field on 22 August 1485. Upon this victory, Henry Tudor proclaimed himself King Henry VII.

Family tree of the principal members of the house of Tudor
Red text indicates Monarch of England. Blue text indicates Monarch of Scotland.
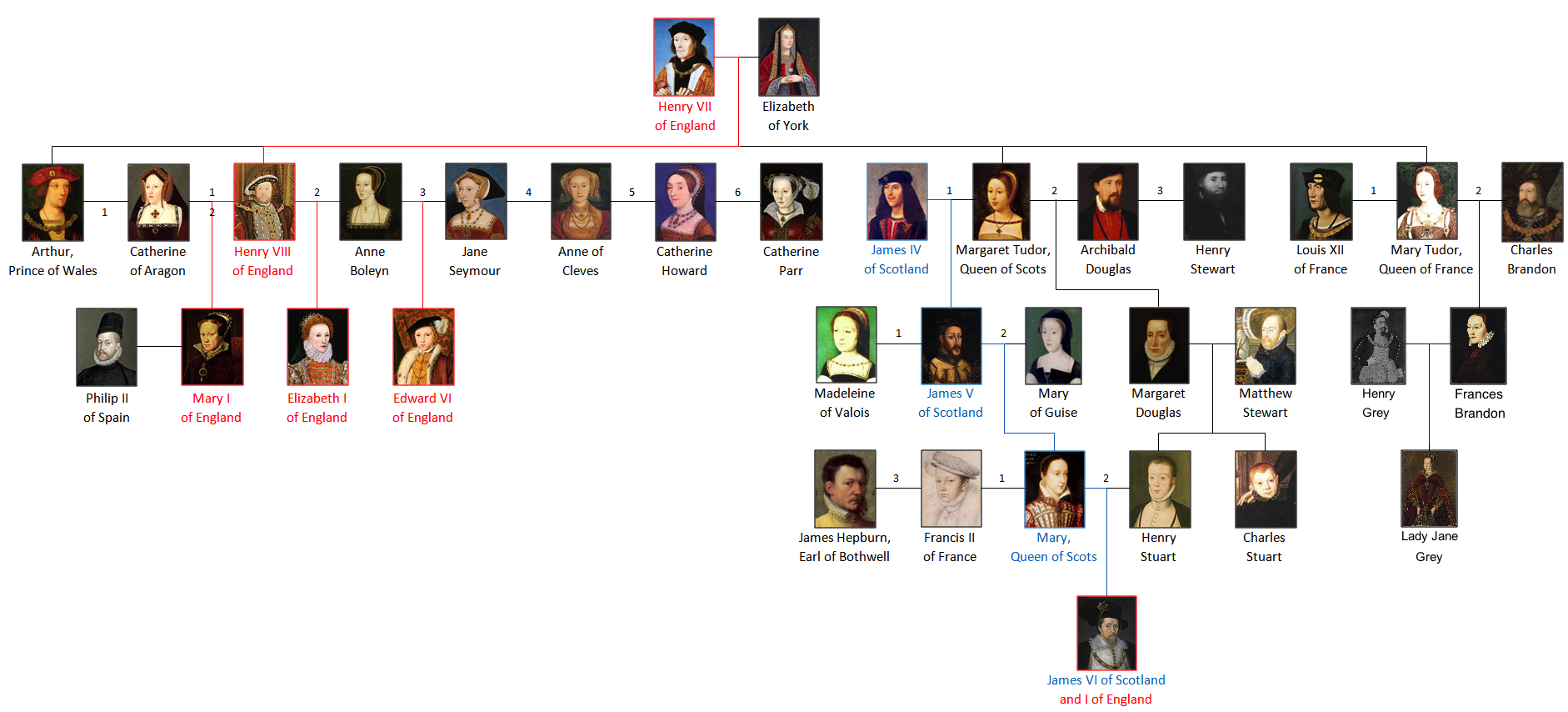

== History ==
=== Henry VII ===
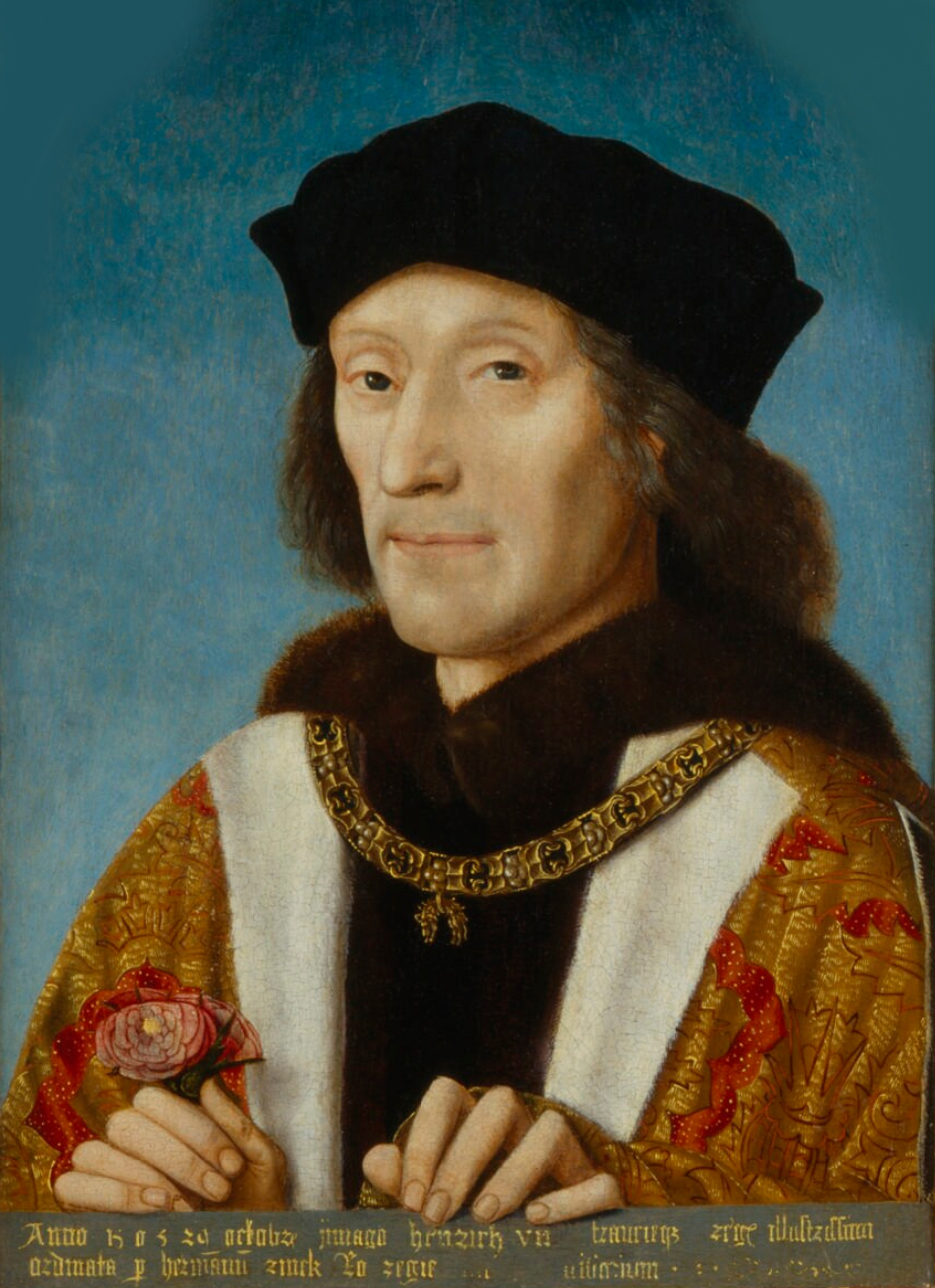
King Henry VII, the founder of the royal house of Tudor

Upon becoming king in 1485, Henry VII moved rapidly to secure his hold on the throne. On 18 January 1486, at Westminster Abbey, he honoured a pledge made three years earlier and married Elizabeth of York, daughter of King Edward IV. They were third cousins, as both were great-great-grandchildren of John of Gaunt. The marriage unified the warring houses of Lancaster and York and gave the couple's children a strong claim to the throne. The unification of the two houses through this marriage is symbolised by the heraldic emblem of the Tudor rose, a combination of the white rose of York and the red rose of Lancaster.

Henry VII and Elizabeth of York had seven children, four of whom survived early childhood:

- Arthur, Prince of Wales (born 1486, died 1502)
- Henry, Duke of York (born 1491, died 1547 as Henry VIII)
- Margaret (born 1489, died 1541), Queen of Scots, who married King James IV
- Mary (born 1496, died 1533), Queen of France, who married King Louis XII

Henry VII's foreign policy had an objective of dynastic security: he formed an alliance with Scotland with the marriage in 1503 of his daughter Margaret to James IV of Scotland, and with Spain through the marriage of his son Arthur to Catherine of Aragon, cementing an alliance with the Spanish monarchs, Ferdinand II of Aragon and Isabella I of Castile. The newlyweds spent their honeymoon at Ludlow Castle, the traditional seat of the Prince of Wales. However, four months after the marriage, Arthur died, leaving his younger brother Henry as heir apparent. Henry VII acquired a papal dispensation allowing prince Henry to marry Arthur's widow; however, Henry VII delayed the marriage.

Henry VII limited his involvement in European politics. He went to war only twice: once in 1489 during the French–Breton War and the invasion of Brittany, and in 1496–1497 in revenge for Scottish support of Perkin Warbeck and for the Scottish invasion of northern England. Henry VII made peace with France in 1492 and the war against Scotland was abandoned because of the Cornish rebellion of 1497. Henry VII made peace with James IV in 1502 with the Treaty of Perpetual Peace, paving the way for the marriage of his daughter Margaret.

One of the main concerns of Henry VII during his reign was the re-accumulation of the funds in the royal treasury. England had never been one of the wealthier European countries, and after the Wars of the Roses this was even more true. Through his strict monetary strategy, he was able to leave a considerable amount of money in the Treasury for his son and successor, Henry VIII. Although it is debated whether Henry VII was a great king, he certainly was a successful one if only because he restored the nation's finances, strengthened the judicial system and successfully denied all other claimants to the throne, thus further securing it for his heir.

=== Henry VIII ===
Henry VIII of England: Henry's quarrels with the Pope led to the creation of the Church of England

The new King Henry VIII succeeded to the throne on 22 April 1509. He married Catherine of Aragon on 11 June; they were crowned at Westminster Abbey on 24 June. Catherine had previously been the wife of Henry's older brother Arthur (died 1502); this fact made the course of their marriage a rocky one from the start. A papal dispensation had to be granted for Henry to be able to marry Catherine, and the negotiations took some time. Despite the fact that Henry's father died before he was married to Catherine, he was determined to marry her anyway and to make sure that everyone knew he intended on being his own master.

When Henry first came to the throne, he had very little interest in actually ruling; rather, he preferred to indulge in luxuries and to partake in sports. He let others control the kingdom for the first two years of his reign, and then when he became more interested in military strategy, he took more interest in ruling his own realm. In his younger years, Henry was described as a man of gentle friendliness, gentle in debate, and who acted as more of a companion than a king. He was tall, handsome and cultured and generous in his gifts and affection and was said to be easy to get along with. The Henry that many people picture when they hear his name is the Henry of his later years, when he became obese, volatile, and was known for his great cruelty.

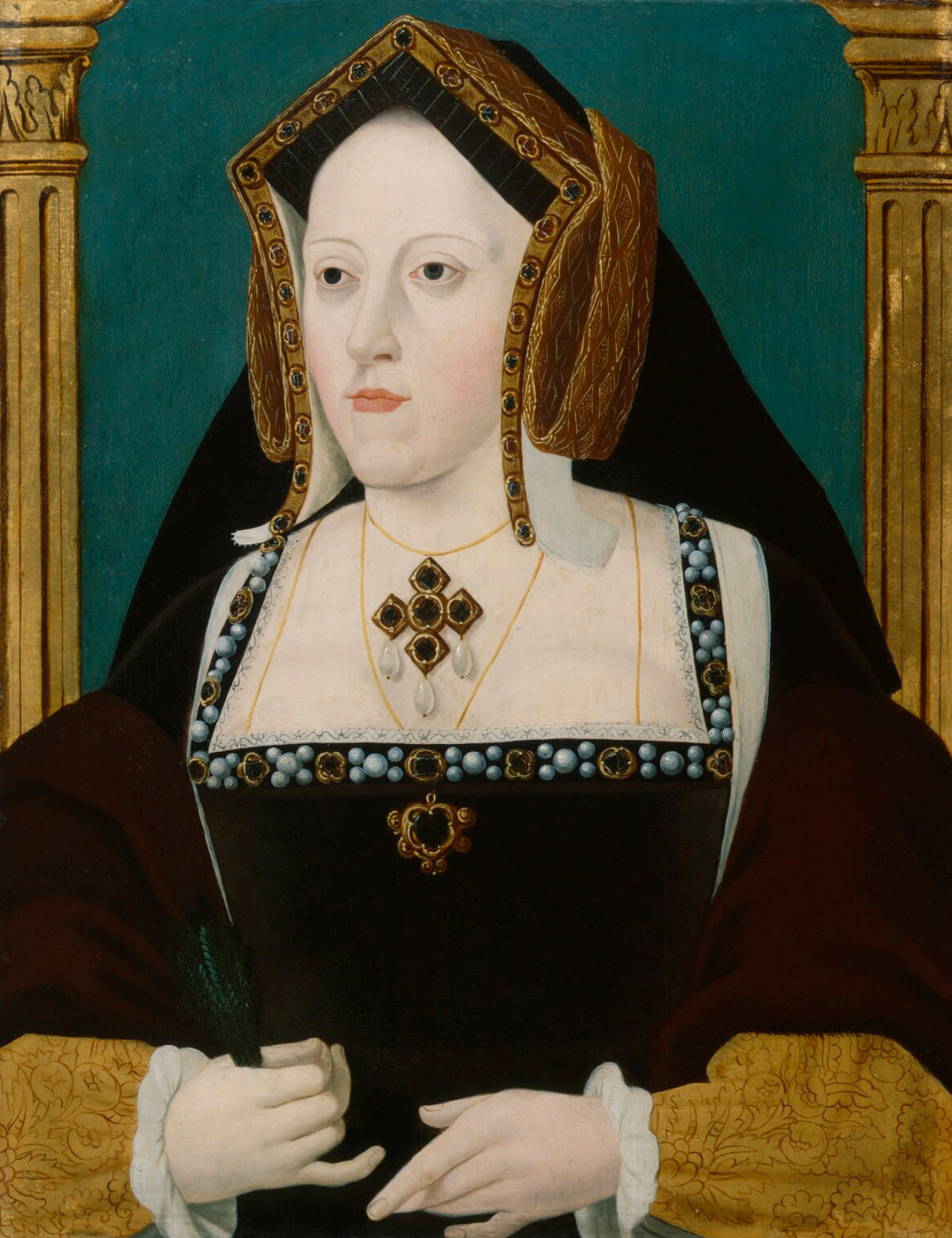
Catherine of Aragon: the Church of England annulled her marriage after she failed to produce a male heir to the Tudor dynasty

Catherine did not bear Henry the sons he was desperate for; her first child, a daughter, was stillborn, and her second child, a son named Henry, Duke of Cornwall, died 52 days after birth. A further set of stillborn children followed, until a surviving daughter, Mary, was born in 1516. When it became clear to Henry that the Tudor line was at risk, he consulted his chief minister Cardinal Thomas Wolsey about the possibility of annulling his marriage to Catherine. Along with Henry's concern that he would not have an heir, it was also obvious to his court that he was becoming tired of his aging wife, who was six years older than he was. Wolsey visited Rome, where he hoped to get the Pope's consent for an annulment. However, the Holy See was reluctant to rescind the earlier papal dispensation and felt heavy pressure from Catherine's nephew, Charles V, Holy Roman Emperor, in support of his aunt. Catherine contested the proceedings, and a protracted legal battle followed. Wolsey fell from favour in 1529 as a result of his failure to procure the annulment, and Henry appointed Thomas Cromwell in his place as chief minister c. 1532.

Despite his failure to produce the results that Henry wanted, Wolsey actively pursued the annulment (divorce was synonymous with annulment at that time). However, Wolsey never planned that Henry would marry Anne Boleyn, with whom the king had become enamoured while she served as a lady-in-waiting in Queen Catherine's household. It is unclear how far Wolsey was actually responsible for the English Reformation, but it is very clear that Henry's desire to marry Anne Boleyn precipitated the schism with Rome. Henry's concern about having an heir to secure his family line and to increase his security while alive would have prompted him to ask for an annulment sooner or later, whether Anne had precipitated it or not. Wolsey's sudden death at Leicester on 29 November 1530 on his journey to the Tower of London saved him from the public humiliation and inevitable execution he would have suffered upon his arrival at the Tower.

==== Break with Rome ====
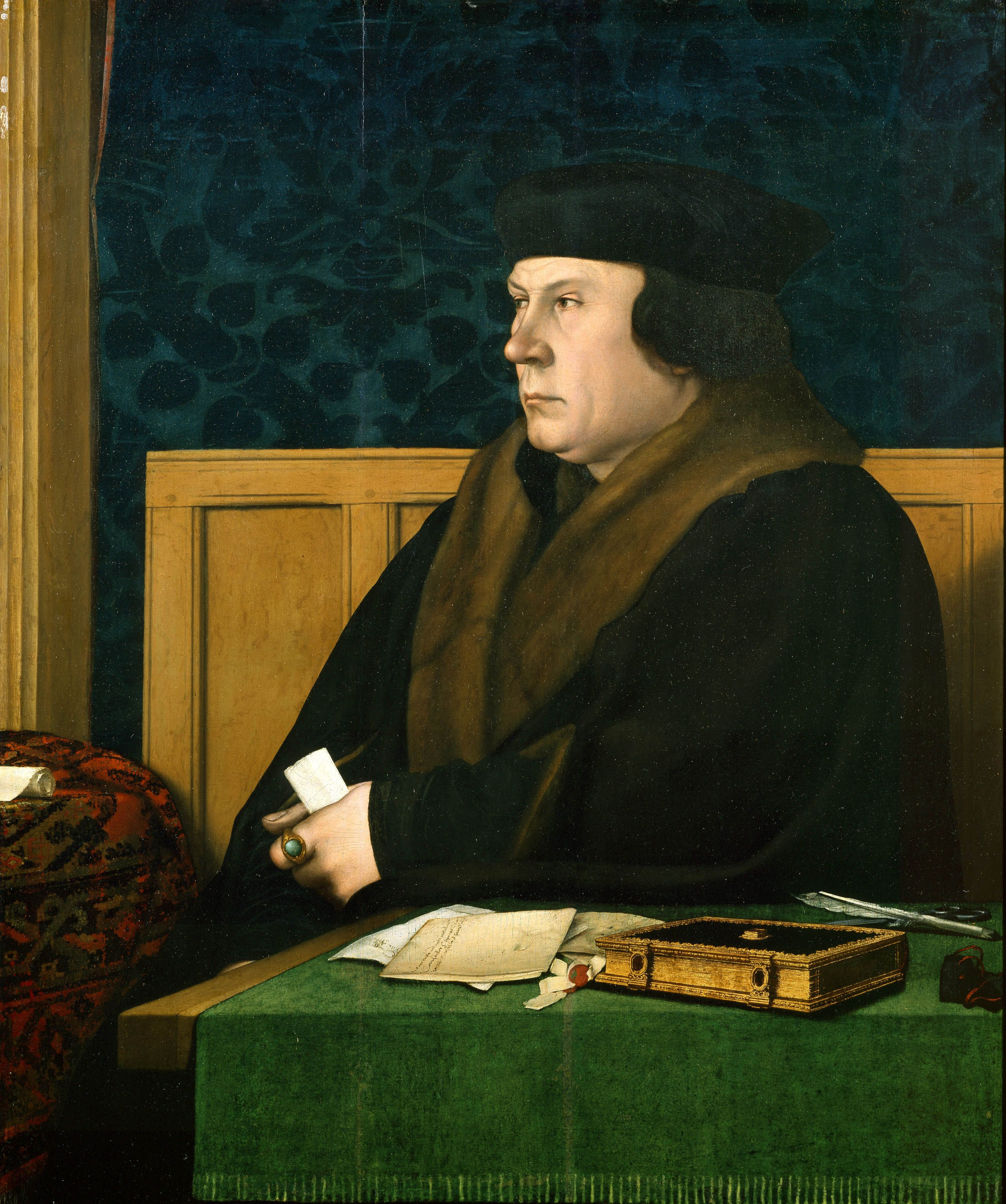
Thomas Cromwell, 1st Earl of Essex, Henry VIII's chief minister responsible for the dissolution of the monasteries

In order to allow Henry to dissolve his marriage and marry Anne Boleyn, the English parliament enacted laws breaking ties with Rome, and declaring the king Supreme Head of the Church of England (from Elizabeth I the monarch is known as the Supreme Governor of the Church of England), thus severing the ecclesiastical structure of England from the Catholic Church and the Pope. The newly appointed Archbishop of Canterbury, Thomas Cranmer, was then able to declare Henry's marriage to Catherine void. Catherine was banished from court, and she spent the last three years of her life in various English houses under "protectorship", similar to house arrest. This allowed Henry to marry Anne Boleyn. She gave birth on 7 September 1533 to a daughter, Elizabeth, named in honour of Henry's mother. Anne had two further pregnancies which ended in miscarriage. In 1536, Anne was arrested, along with six courtiers. Thomas Cromwell, Anne's former ally, stepped in again, claiming that she had taken lovers during her marriage to Henry, including her own brother, George Boleyn, and she was tried for high treason and incest. These charges were most likely fabricated, but she was found guilty and executed in May 1536.

==== Protestant alliance ====
Henry married again, for a third time, to Jane Seymour, the daughter of a Wiltshire knight, and with whom he had become enamoured while she was still a lady-in-waiting to Queen Anne. Jane became pregnant, and in 1537 produced a son, who became King Edward VI following Henry's death in 1547. Jane died of puerperal fever only a few days after the birth, leaving Henry devastated. Cromwell continued to gain the king's favour when he designed and pushed through the Laws in Wales Acts, uniting England and Wales.

In 1540, Henry married for the fourth time to the daughter of a Protestant German duke, Anne of Cleves, thus forming an alliance with the Protestant German states. Henry was reluctant to marry again, especially to a Protestant, but he was persuaded when the court painter Hans Holbein the Younger showed him a flattering portrait of her. She arrived in England in December 1539, and Henry rode to Rochester to meet her on 1 January 1540. Although the historian Gilbert Burnet claimed that Henry called her a Flanders Mare, there is no evidence that he said this; in truth, court ambassadors negotiating the marriage praised her beauty. Whatever the circumstances were, the marriage failed, and Anne agreed to a peaceful annulment, assumed the title My Lady, the King's Sister, and received a large settlement, which included Richmond Palace, Hever Castle, and numerous other estates across the country. Although the marriage made sense in terms of foreign policy, Henry was still enraged and offended by the match. Henry chose to blame Cromwell for the failed marriage, and ordered him beheaded on 28 July 1540. Henry kept his word and took care of Anne in his last years alive; however, after his death Anne suffered from extreme financial hardship because Edward VI's councillors refused to give her any funds and confiscated the homes she had been given. She pleaded to her brother to let her return home, but he only sent a few agents who tried to assist in helping her situation and refused to let her return home. Anne died on 16 July 1557 in Chelsea Manor.

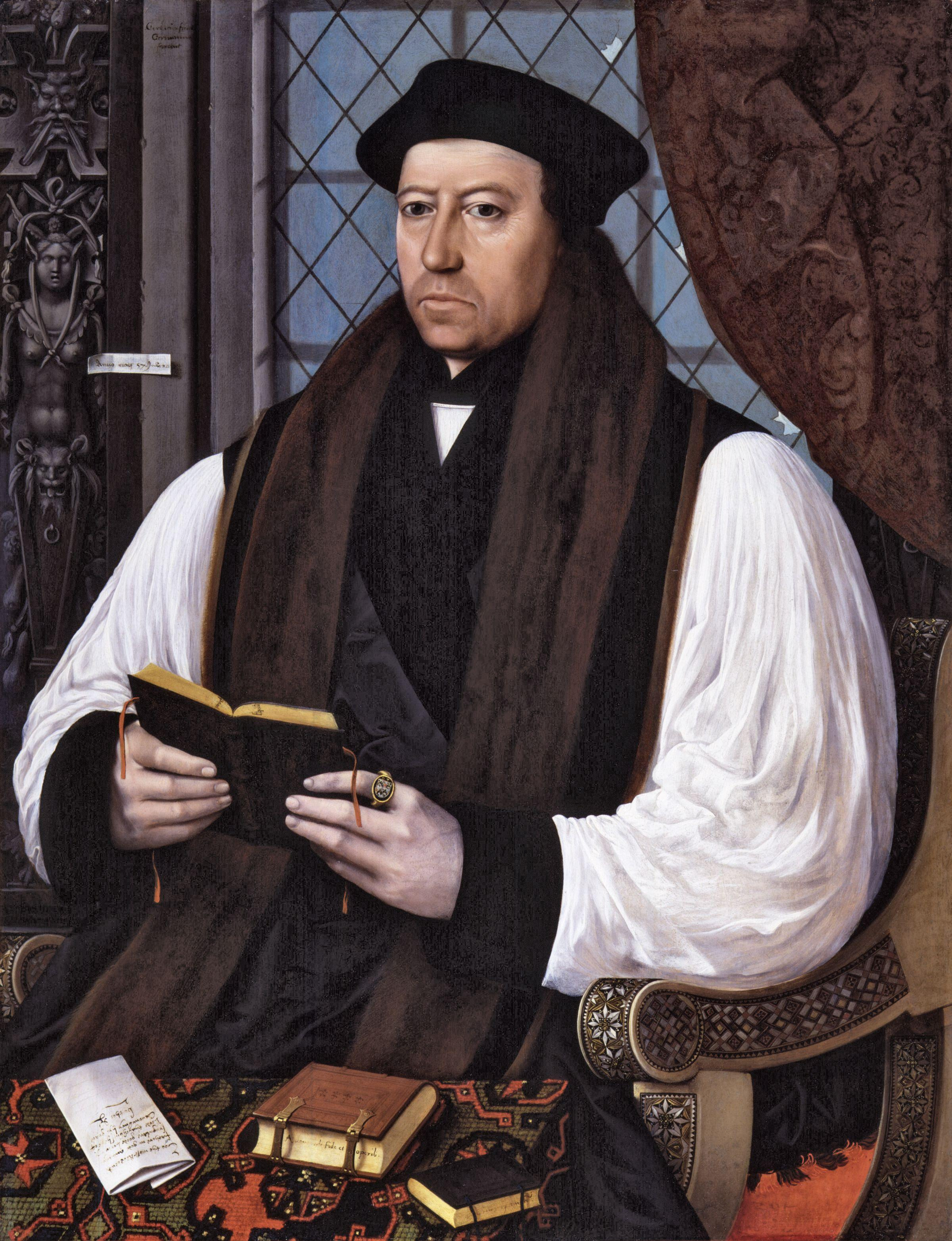
Thomas Cranmer, Henry's first Protestant Archbishop of Canterbury, responsible for the Book of Common Prayer during Edward VI's reign

The fifth marriage was to the young Catherine Howard, niece of the Catholic Thomas Howard, 3rd Duke of Norfolk. Catherine was promoted by Norfolk in the hope that she would persuade Henry to restore the Catholic religion in England. Henry called her his "rose without a thorn", but the marriage ended in failure. Henry's infatuation with Catherine started before the end of his marriage with Anne when she was still a member of Anne's court. Catherine was young and vivacious, but Henry's age made him less inclined to use Catherine in the bedroom; rather, he preferred to admire her, which Catherine soon grew tired of. Catherine, forced into a marriage to an unattractive, obese man over 30 years her senior, had never wanted to marry Henry, and allegedly conducted an affair with the King's favourite, Thomas Culpeper, while Henry and she were married. During her questioning, Catherine first denied everything but eventually she was broken down and told of her infidelity and her pre-nuptial relations with other men. Henry, first enraged, threatened to torture her to death but later became overcome with grief and self-pity. She was accused of treason and was executed on 13 February 1542, destroying the English Catholic holdouts' hopes of a national reconciliation with the Catholic Church. Her execution also marked the end of the Howard family's power and influence within the English court.

By the time Henry conducted another marriage with his final wife Catherine Parr in July 1543, the old Roman Catholic advisers, including the Duke of Norfolk, had lost all their power and influence. Norfolk himself was still a committed Catholic, and he was nearly persuaded to arrest Catherine for preaching Lutheran doctrines to Henry while she attended his ill health. However, she managed to reconcile with the King after vowing that she had only argued about religion with him to take his mind off the suffering caused by his ulcerous leg. Her peacemaking also helped reconcile Henry with his daughters Mary and Elizabeth and fostered a good relationship between her and Edward.

=== Edward VI ===
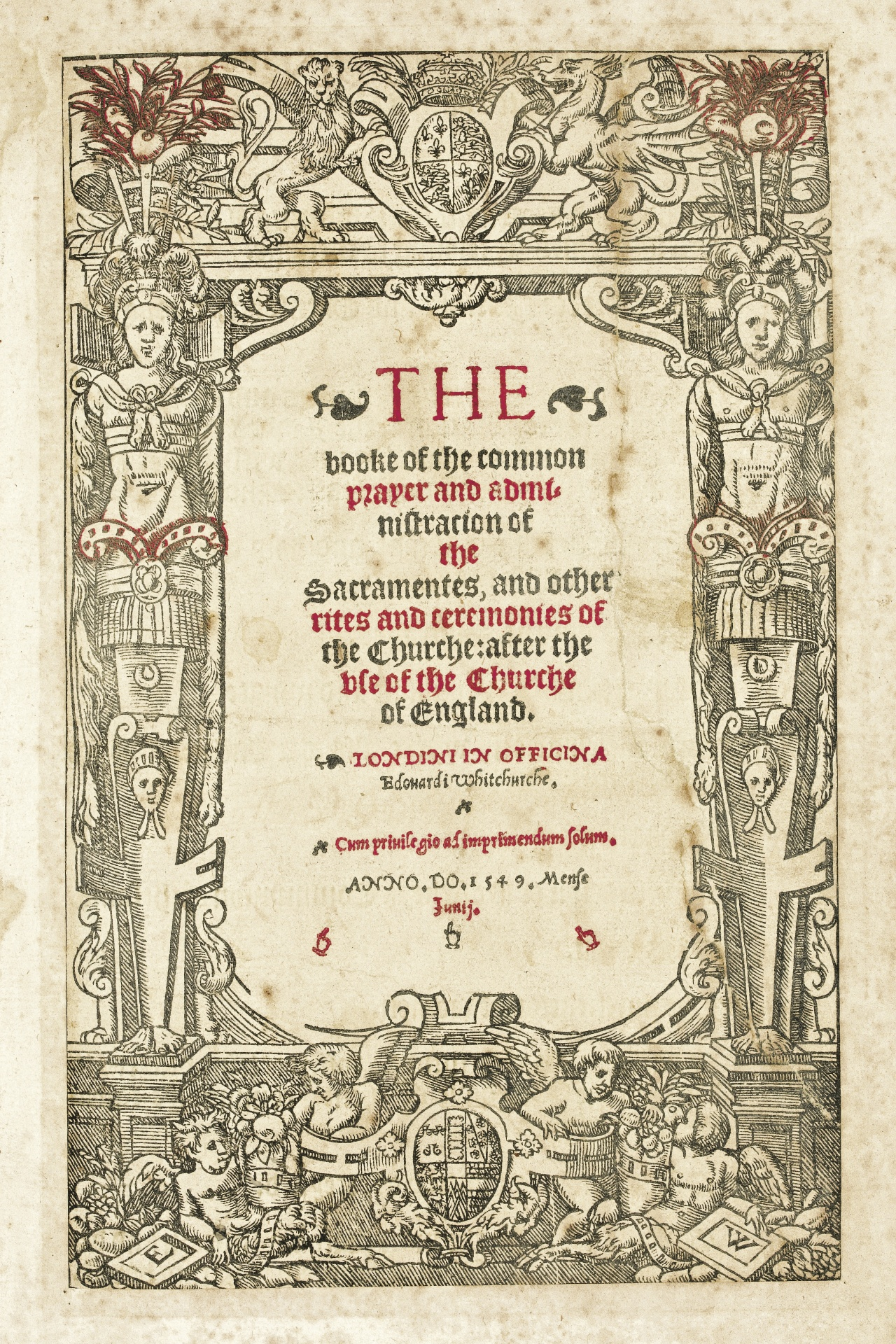
The title page of Archbishop Cranmer's Book of Common Prayer, 1549

Henry died on 28 January 1547. His will had reinstated his daughters by his annulled marriages to Catherine of Aragon and Anne Boleyn to the line of succession. Edward, his nine-year-old son by Jane Seymour, succeeded as Edward VI. Unfortunately, the young King's kingdom was usually in turmoil between nobles who were trying to strengthen their own positions in the kingdom by using the Regency in their favour.

==== England under Lord Somerset ====
Although Henry had specified a group of men to act as regents during Edward's minority, Edward Seymour, the young king's uncle, quickly seized control and created himself Duke of Somerset on 15 February 1547. His domination of the Privy Council, the king's most senior body of advisers, was unchallenged. Somerset aimed to unite England and Scotland by marrying Edward to his cousin, the young Mary, Queen of Scots, and aimed to forcibly impose the English Reformation on the Church of Scotland. Somerset led a large and well equipped army to Scotland, where he and the Scottish regent James Hamilton, 2nd Earl of Arran, commanded their armies at the Battle of Pinkie on 10 September 1547. The English won the battle, and after this Queen Mary was smuggled to France, where she was betrothed to the Dauphin, the future King Francis II of France. Despite Somerset's disappointment that no Scottish marriage would take place, his victory at Pinkie made his position appear unassailable.

Edward VI was taught that he had to lead religious reform. In 1549, the Crown ordered the publication of the Book of Common Prayer, containing the forms of worship for daily and Sunday church services. The controversial new book was not welcomed by either reformers or Catholic conservatives; it was especially condemned in Devon and Cornwall, where traditional Catholic loyalty was at its strongest. In Cornwall at the time, many of the people could only speak the Cornish language, so the uniform English Bibles and church services were not understood by many. This caused the Prayer Book Rebellion, in which groups of Cornish non-conformists gathered round the mayor. The rebellion worried Somerset, now Lord Protector, and he sent an army to impose a military solution to the rebellion. The rebellion hardened the Crown against Catholics. Fear of Catholicism focused on Edward's elder half-sister, Mary, who was a pious and devout Catholic. Although called before the Privy Council several times to renounce her faith and stop hearing the Catholic Mass, she refused. Edward had a good relationship with his sister Elizabeth, who was a Protestant, albeit a moderate one, but this was strained when Elizabeth was accused of having an affair with the Duke of Somerset's brother, Thomas Seymour, 1st Baron Seymour of Sudeley, who had married Henry VIII's widow, Catherine Parr. Seymour had invaded Edward's apartments and had killed his dog in a scheme to forcefully gain control over him. Elizabeth was interviewed by one of Edward's advisers, and she was eventually found not to be guilty, despite forced confessions from her servants Kat Ashley and Sir Thomas Parry. Thomas Seymour was beheaded on 20 March 1549.

==== Problematic succession ====
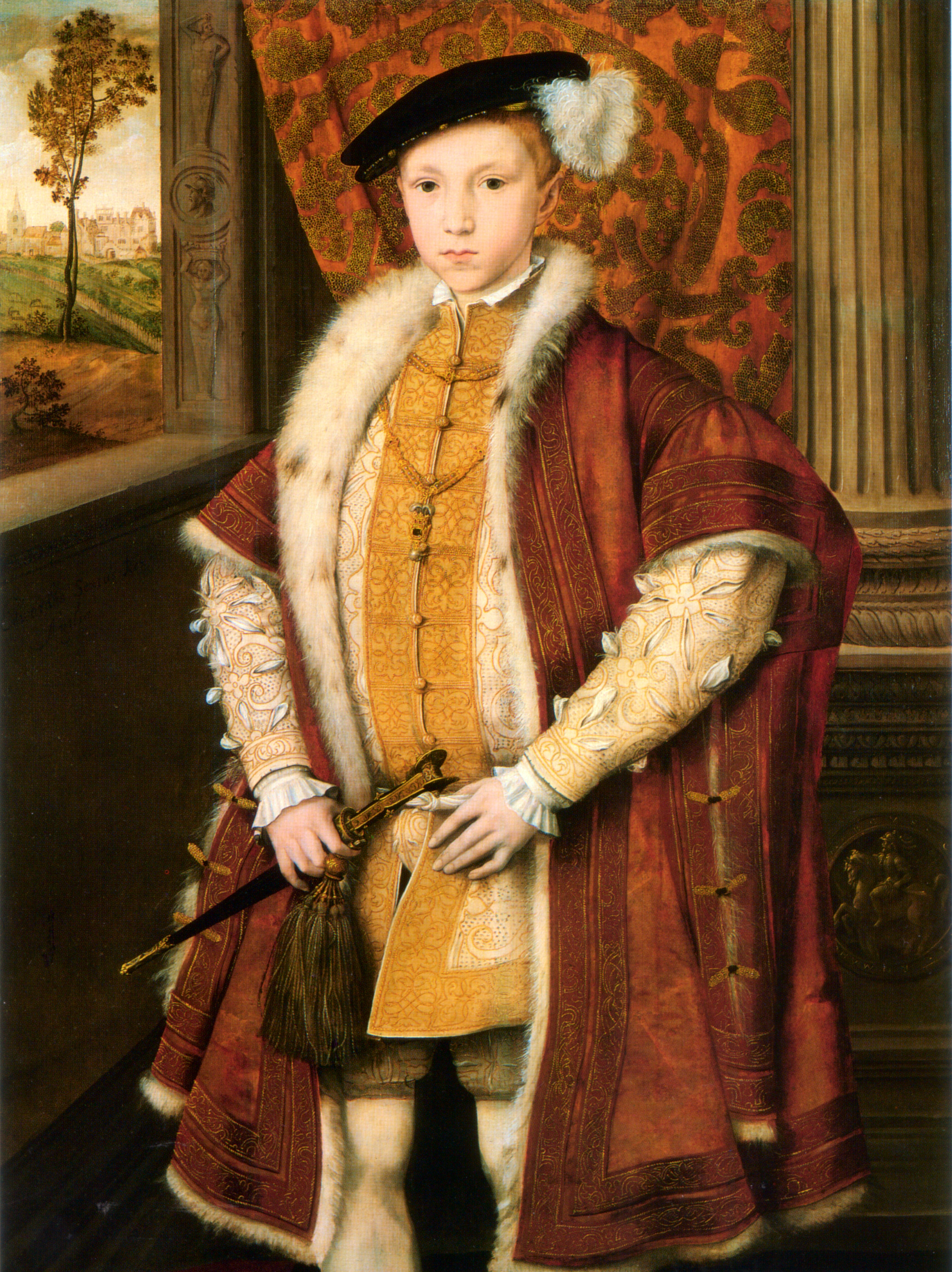
A small boy with a big mind: Edward VI, desperate for a Protestant succession, changed his father's will to allow Lady Jane Grey to become queen

Lord Protector Somerset was also losing favour. After forcibly removing Edward VI to Windsor Castle, with the intention of keeping him hostage, Somerset was removed from power by members of the council, led by his chief rival, John Dudley, Earl of Warwick, who created himself Duke of Northumberland shortly after his rise. Northumberland effectively became Lord Protector, but he did not use this title, learning from the mistakes his predecessor made. Northumberland was furiously ambitious, and aimed to secure Protestant uniformity while making himself rich with land and money in the process. He ordered churches to be stripped of all traditional Catholic symbolism, resulting in the simplicity often seen in Church of England churches today. A revision of the Book of Common Prayer was published in 1552. When Edward VI became ill in 1553, his advisers looked to the possible imminent accession of the Catholic Lady Mary, and feared that she would overturn all the reforms made during Edward's reign. Perhaps surprisingly, it was the dying Edward himself who feared a return to Catholicism, and wrote a new will repudiating the 1544 will of Henry VIII. This gave the throne to his cousin Lady Jane Grey, the granddaughter of Henry VIII's sister Mary Tudor, who, after the death of Louis XII of France in 1515 had married Henry VIII's favourite Charles Brandon, 1st Duke of Suffolk.

Edward VI died on 6 July 1553, at the age of 15. With his death, the direct male line of the House of Tudor ended.

=== Lady Jane Grey ===
The dying Edward VI, under the pressure of John Dudley, 1st Duke of Northumberland, named his cousin and Northumberland's daughter-in-law, Lady Jane Grey, as his successor due to her Protestant beliefs. Edward's reluctance to follow the line of succession, which named his half-sister Mary as next in line, stemmed from his knowledge that Mary, firmly Catholic, would restore England to the Vatican. Lady Jane Grey was consistently at court after her father was made Duke of Suffolk in October 1551. Her mother, Frances Grey, Duchess of Suffolk, was the daughter of Mary Tudor, the sister of Henry VIII. On 21 May 1553, Jane was married to Northumberland's son, Lord Guildford Dudley. This was a political move organised by the Duke to ensure that Protestantism stayed the national religion if Jane were to become queen. Edward died on 6 July 1553 and 16-year-old Jane, who fainted when she heard the news, was made queen on 10 July. However, despite the efforts of the Duke of Northumberland and Jane's father, the Duke of Suffolk, the public's support was with Lady Mary, the rightful heir according to Henry VIII's will. On 19 July Suffolk persuaded his daughter to relinquish the throne, which she had never wanted, to Mary. Mary's supporters joined her in a triumphal procession to London, accompanied by her younger sister Elizabeth. Lady Jane and her father were arrested for high treason and imprisoned in the Tower of London. Her father was pardoned, but his participation in Wyatt's rebellion led to his execution shortly after. Jane and her husband Lord Guildford were sentenced to death and beheaded on 12 February 1554. Jane was only 17 years old, and the cruel way in which her life had been lost for a throne she never desired aroused much sympathy among the public.

=== Mary I ===
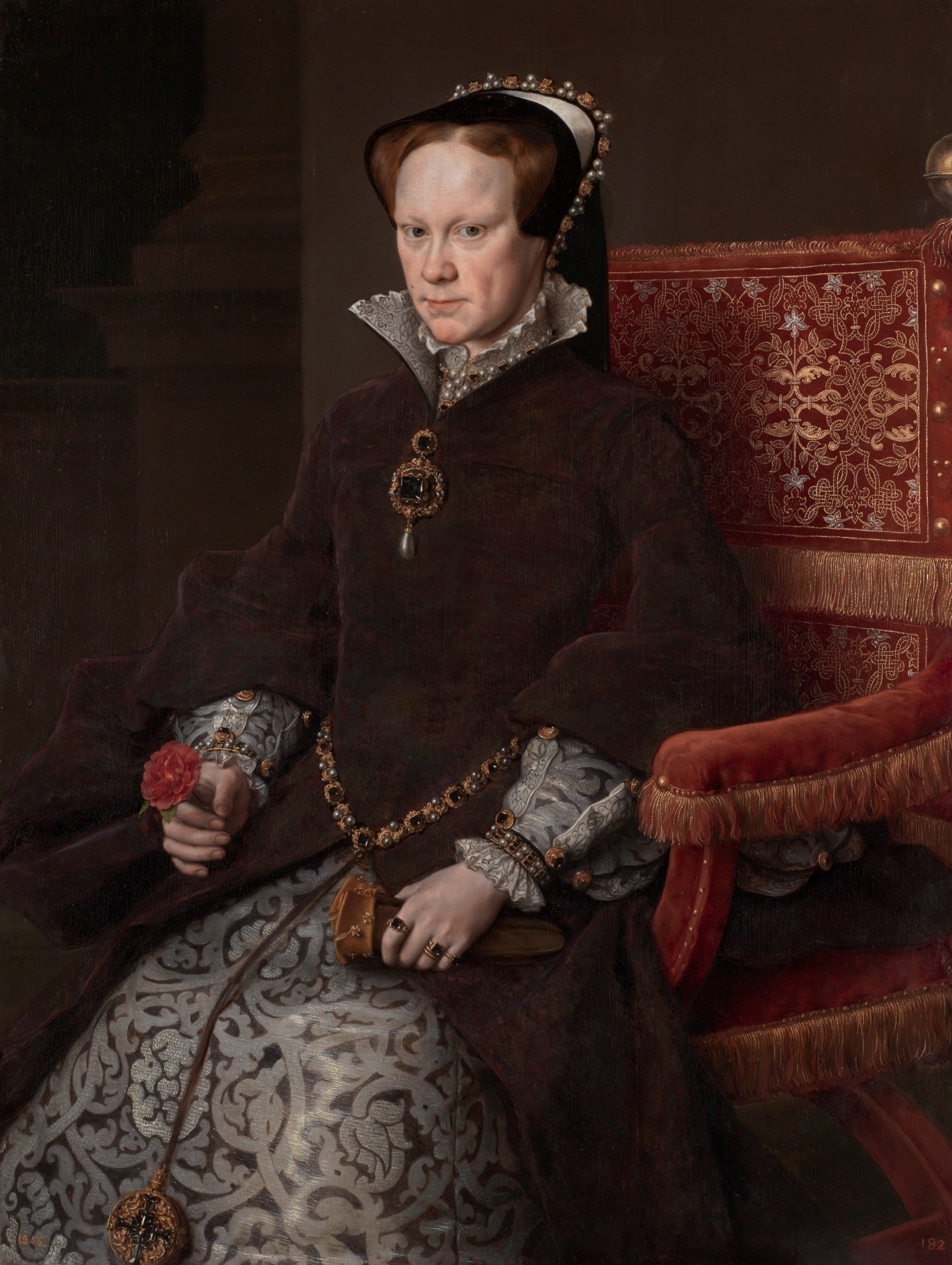
Mary I, who tried to return England to the Roman Catholic Church

Mary soon announced her intention to marry the Spanish prince, Philip, son of her cousin Charles V, Holy Roman Emperor. The prospect of a marriage alliance with Spain proved extremely unpopular with the English people, who were worried that Spain would use England as a satellite, involving England in wars without the popular support of the people. Popular discontent grew; a Protestant courtier, Thomas Wyatt the Younger, led a rebellion against Mary aiming to depose and replace her with her half-sister Elizabeth. The plot was discovered, and Wyatt's supporters were hunted down and killed. Wyatt himself was tortured, in the hope that he would give evidence that Elizabeth was involved so that Mary could have her executed for treason. Wyatt refused to implicate Elizabeth, and he was beheaded in April 1554. Elizabeth spent two months imprisoned at the Tower of London, and then was placed under house arrest at Woodstock Palace for a year.

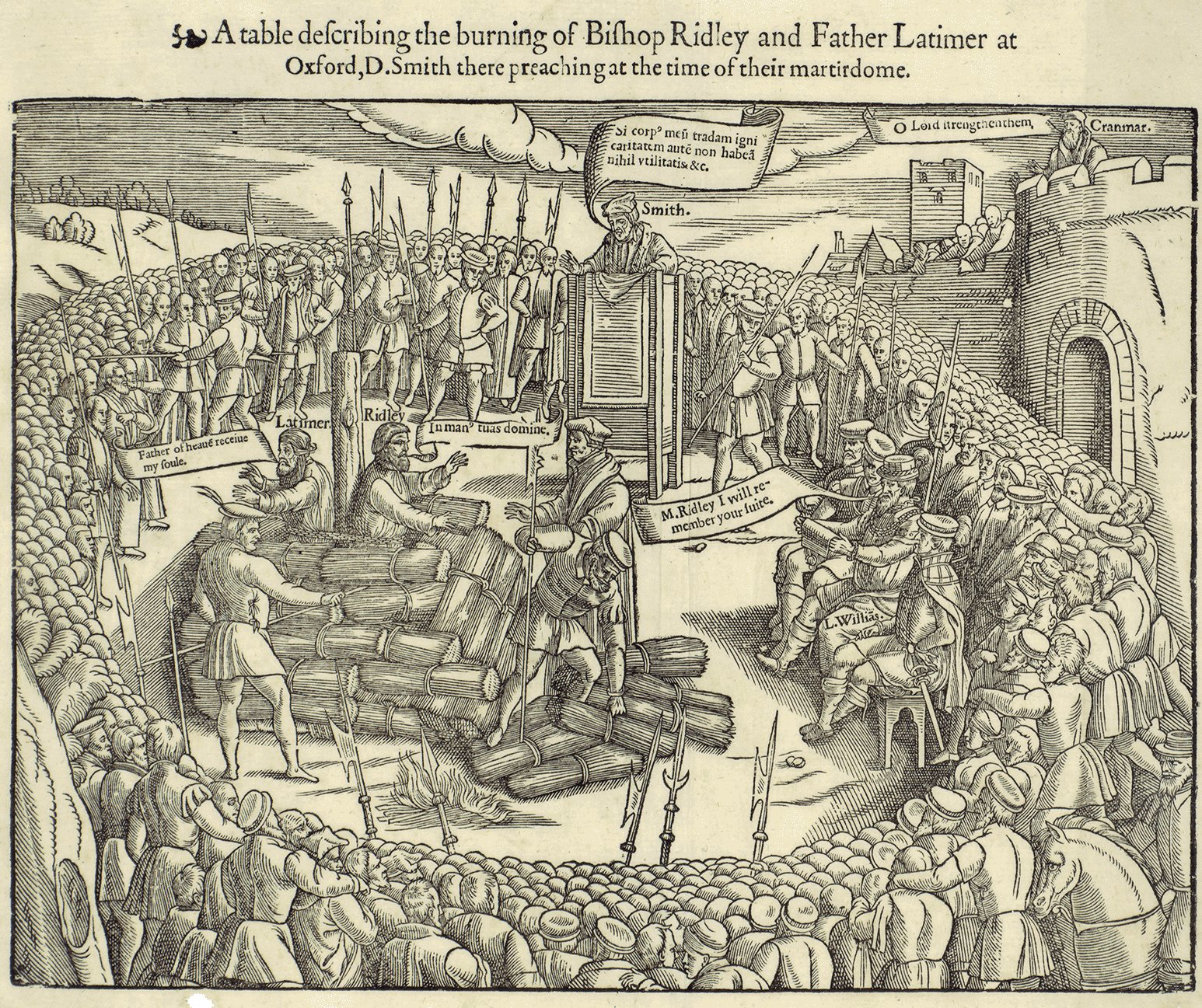
Protestants Hugh Latimer and Nicholas Ridley being burned at the stake during Mary's reign

Mary married Philip at Winchester Cathedral, on 25 July 1554, and he thereby became king jure uxoris until her death. Philip found her unattractive, and only spent a minimal amount of time with her. Despite Mary believing she was pregnant numerous times during her five-year reign, she never bore children. Devastated that she rarely saw her husband, and anxious that she was not bearing an heir to Catholic England, Mary became bitter and resentful. In her determination to restore England to the Catholic faith and to secure her throne from Protestant threats, she had over 280 Protestants burnt at the stake in the Marian persecutions, between 1554 and 1558. Protestants came to hate her as "Bloody Mary." Charles Dickens stated that "as bloody Queen Mary this woman has become famous, and as Bloody Queen Mary she will ever be remembered with horror and detestation".

Mary's dream of a new, Catholic Habsburg line was finished, and her popularity further declined when she lost Calais – the last English territory on French soil – to François, Duke of Guise, in January 1558. Mary's reign, however, introduced a new coining system that would be used until the 18th century, and her marriage to Philip II created new trade routes for England. Mary's government took a number of steps towards reversing the inflation, budgetary deficits, poverty, and trade crisis of her kingdom. She explored the commercial potential of Russian, African, and Baltic markets, revised the customs system, worked to counter the currency debasements of her predecessors, amalgamated several revenue courts, and strengthened the governing authority of the middling and larger towns. Mary also welcomed the first Russian ambassador to England, creating relations between England and Russia for the first time. Had she lived a little longer, Catholicism, which she worked so hard to restore into the realm, might have taken deeper root than it did. However, her actions in pursuit of this goal arguably spurred on the Protestant cause, through the many people she killed. Mary died on 17 November 1558 at the age of 42.

=== Elizabeth I ===
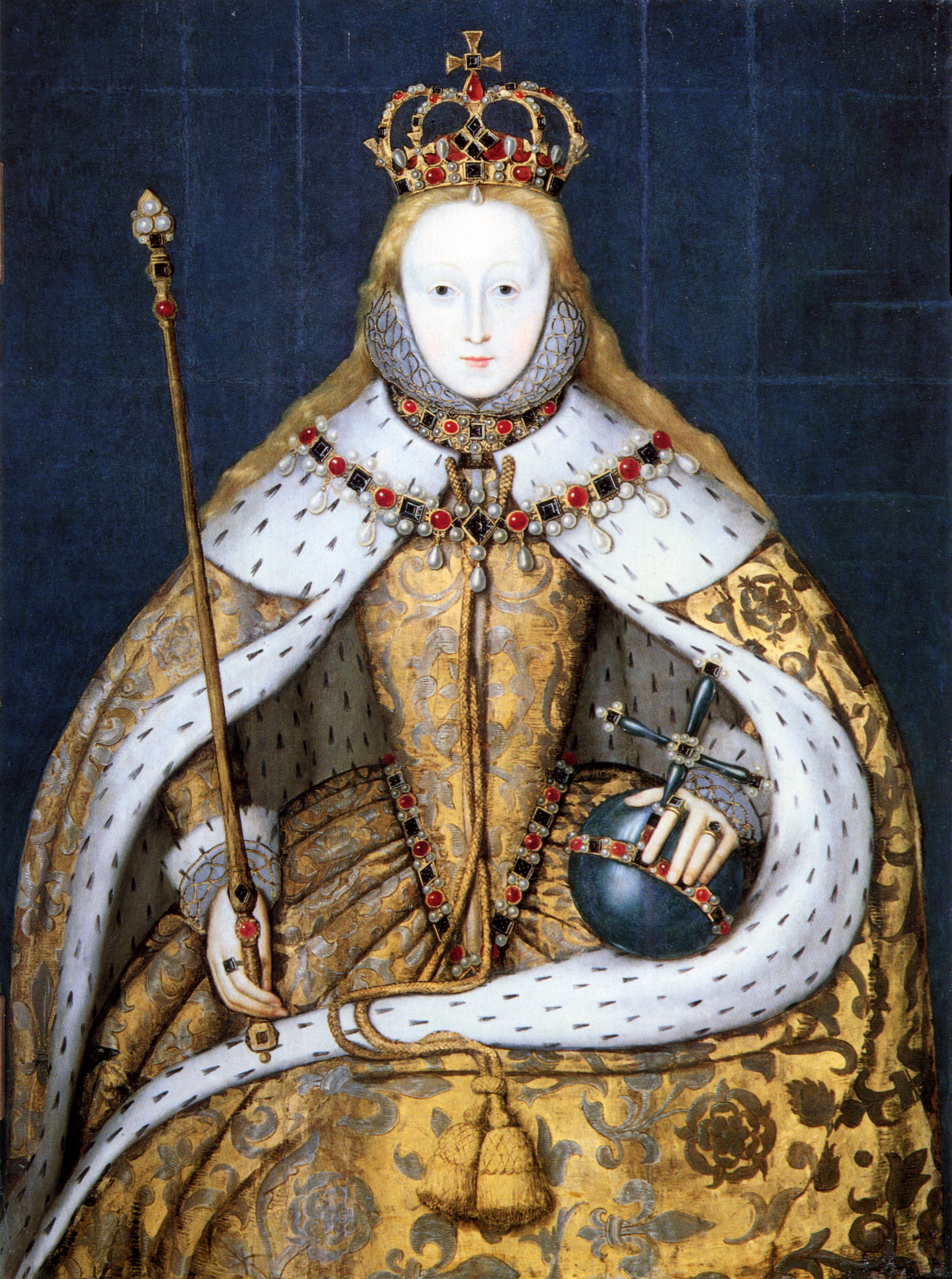
Elizabeth I at her coronation on 15 January 1559

Elizabeth I, who was staying at Hatfield House at the time of her accession, rode to London to the cheers of both the ruling class and the common people.

When Elizabeth came to the throne, there was much apprehension among members of the council appointed by Mary, because many of them (as noted by the Spanish ambassador) had participated in several plots against Elizabeth, such as her imprisonment in the Tower, trying to force her to marry a foreign prince and thereby sending her out of the realm, and even pushing for her death. In response to their fear, she chose as her chief minister William Cecil, 1st Baron Burghley, a Protestant, and former secretary to Lord Protector Edward Seymour, 1st Duke of Somerset and then to John Dudley, 1st Duke of Northumberland. Under Mary, he had been spared, and often visited Elizabeth, ostensibly to review her accounts and expenditure. Elizabeth also appointed her personal favourite, the son of the Duke of Northumberland Robert Dudley, her Master of the Horse, giving him constant personal access to the queen.

==== Early years ====
Elizabeth had a long, turbulent path to the throne. She had a number of problems during her childhood, the main one being after the execution of her mother, Anne Boleyn. When Anne was beheaded, Henry declared Elizabeth illegitimate and she would, therefore, not be able to inherit the throne. Henry returned her to the line of succession in the Third Succession Act of 1543. After the death of her father, she was raised by his widow, Catherine Parr and her new husband Thomas Seymour, 1st Baron Seymour of Sudeley. Seymour may have groomed and sexually abused her, but their relationship was seen instead as an affair and caused scandal. During the interrogations, she answered truthfully and boldly and all charges were dropped. Seymour, however, was executed on 20 March 1549. Elizabeth was an excellent student, well-schooled in Latin, French, Italian, and somewhat in Greek, and was a talented writer. She was supposedly a very skilled musician as well, in both singing and playing the lute. After the rebellion of Thomas Wyatt the Younger in 1554, Elizabeth was imprisoned in the Tower of London. No proof could be found that Elizabeth was involved and she was released and retired to the countryside until the death of her half-sister, Mary.

==== Imposing the Church of England ====
Elizabeth was a moderate Protestant; she was the daughter of Anne Boleyn, who played a key role in the English Reformation in the 1520s. She had been brought up by Blanche Herbert Lady Troy. At her coronation in January 1559, many of the bishops – Catholic, appointed by Mary, who had expelled many of the Protestant clergymen when she became queen in 1553 – refused to perform the service in English. Eventually, the relatively minor Bishop of Carlisle, Owen Oglethorpe, performed the ceremony; but when Oglethorpe attempted to perform traditional Catholic parts of the coronation, Elizabeth got up and left. Following the coronation, two important acts were passed through Parliament: the Act of Uniformity 1558 and the Act of Supremacy 1558, establishing the Protestant Church of England and creating Elizabeth Supreme Governor of the Church of England (Supreme Head, the title used by her father and brother, was seen as inappropriate for a woman ruler). These acts, known collectively as the Elizabethan Religious Settlement, made it compulsory to attend church services every Sunday; and imposed an oath on clergymen and statesmen to recognise the Church of England, the independence of the Church of England from the Catholic Church, and the authority of Elizabeth as Supreme Governor. Elizabeth made it clear that if they refused the oath the first time, they would have a second opportunity, after which, if the oath was not sworn, the offenders would be deprived of their offices and estates.

==== Pressure to marry ====
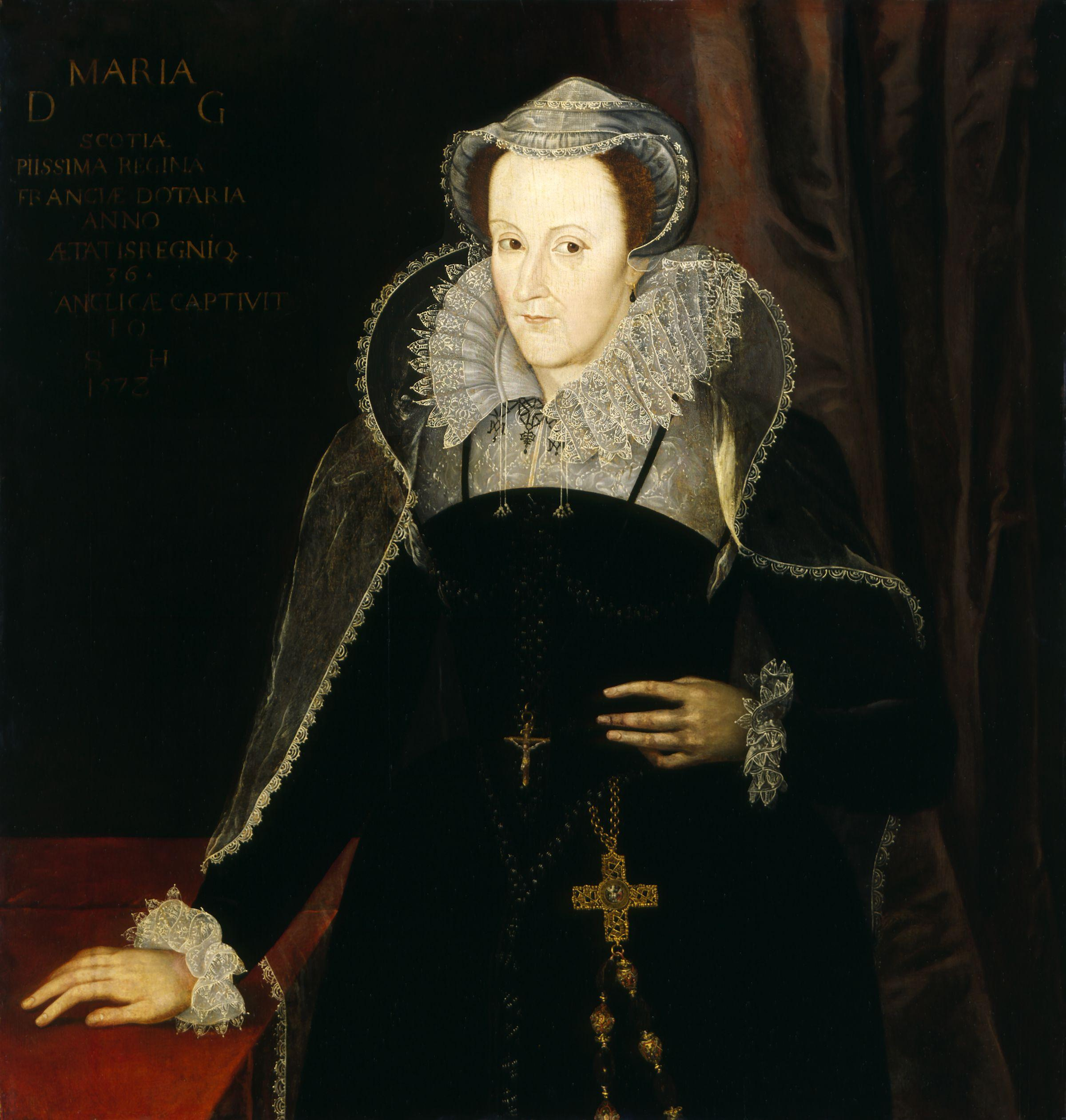
Mary, Queen of Scots, who conspired with English nobles to take the English throne for herself

Even though Elizabeth was only twenty-five when she came to the throne, she was absolutely sure of her God-given place to be the queen and of her responsibilities as the 'handmaiden of the Lord'. She never let anyone challenge her authority as queen, even though many people, who felt she was weak and should be married, tried to do so. The popularity of Elizabeth was extremely high, but her Privy Council, her Parliament and her subjects thought that the unmarried queen should take a husband; it was generally accepted that, once a queen regnant was married, the husband would relieve the woman of the burdens of head of state. Also, without an heir, the Tudor line would end; the risk of civil war between rival claimants was a possibility if Elizabeth died childless. Numerous suitors from nearly all European nations sent ambassadors to English court to put forward their suit. Risk of death came dangerously close in 1564 when Elizabeth caught smallpox; when she was most at risk, she named Robert Dudley as Lord Protector in the event of her death. After her recovery, she appointed Dudley to the Privy Council and created him Earl of Leicester, in the hope that he would marry Mary, Queen of Scots. Mary rejected him, and instead married Henry Stuart, Lord Darnley, a descendant of Henry VII, giving Mary a stronger claim to the English throne. Although many Catholics were loyal to Elizabeth, many also believed that, because Elizabeth was declared illegitimate after her parents' marriage was annulled, Mary was the strongest legitimate claimant. Despite this, Elizabeth would not name Mary her heir; as she had experienced during the reign of her predecessor Mary I, the opposition could flock around the heir if they were disheartened with Elizabeth's rule.

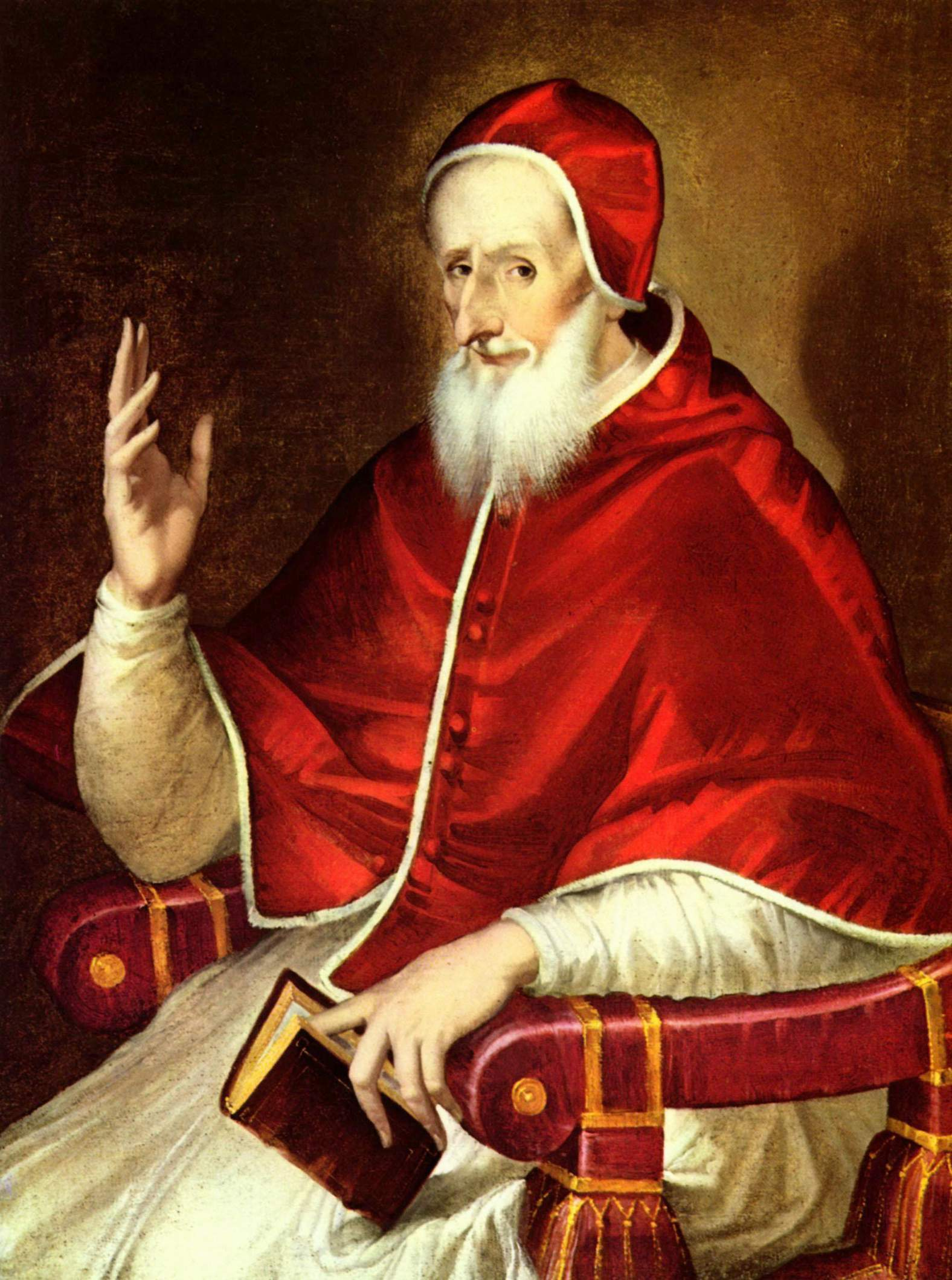
Pope Pius V, who issued the Papal bull excommunicating Elizabeth and relieving her subjects of their allegiance to her

Numerous threats to the Tudor line occurred during Elizabeth's reign. In 1569, a group of Earls led by Charles Neville, 6th Earl of Westmorland, and Thomas Percy, 7th Earl of Northumberland attempted to depose Elizabeth and replace her with Mary, Queen of Scots. In 1571, the Protestant-turned-Catholic Thomas Howard, 4th Duke of Norfolk, had plans to marry Mary, Queen of Scots, and then replace Elizabeth with Mary. The plot, masterminded by Roberto di Ridolfi, was discovered and Howard was beheaded. The next major uprising was in 1601, when Robert Devereux, 2nd Earl of Essex, attempted to raise the city of London against Elizabeth's government. The city of London proved unwilling to rebel; Essex and most of his co-rebels were executed. Threats also came from abroad. In 1570, Pope Pius V issued a Papal bull, Regnans in Excelsis, excommunicating Elizabeth, and releasing her subjects from their allegiance to her. Elizabeth came under pressure from Parliament to execute Mary, Queen of Scots, to prevent any further attempts to replace her; though faced with several official requests, she vacillated over the decision to execute an anointed queen. Finally, she was persuaded of Mary's (treasonous) complicity in the plotting against her, and she signed the death warrant in 1586. Mary was executed at Fotheringhay Castle on 8 February 1587, to the outrage of Catholic Europe.

There are many reasons debated as to why Elizabeth never married. It was rumoured that she was in love with Robert Dudley, and that on one of her summer progresses she had birthed his illegitimate child. This rumour was just one of many that swirled around the two's long-standing friendship. However, more important to focus on were the disasters that many women, such as her mother Anne Boleyn, suffered due to being married into the royal family. Her sister Mary's marriage to Philip brought great contempt to the country, for many of her subjects despised Spain and Philip and feared that he would try to take complete control. Recalling her father's disdain for Anne of Cleves, Elizabeth also refused to enter into a foreign match with a man that she had never seen before, so that also eliminated a large number of suitors.

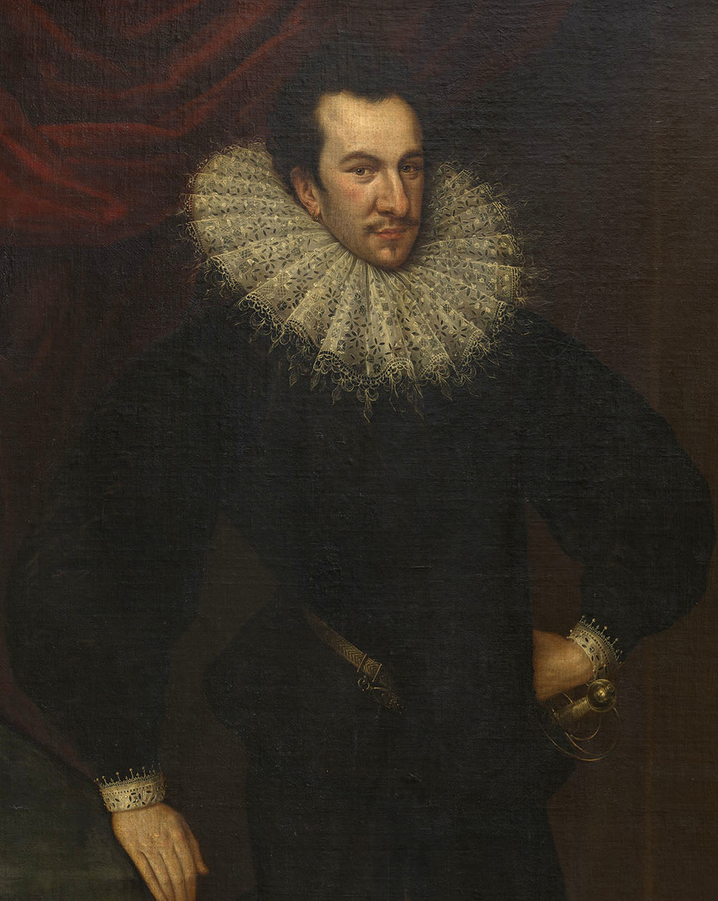
Francis, Duke of Anjou, who was the last serious suitor for Elizabeth I.

==== Last hopes for a Tudor heir ====
Despite the uncertainty of Elizabeth's – and therefore the Tudors' – hold on England, she never married. The closest she came to marriage was between 1579 and 1581, when she was courted by Francis, Duke of Anjou, the son of Henry II of France and Catherine de' Medici. Despite Elizabeth's government constantly begging her to marry in the early years of her reign, it was now persuading Elizabeth not to marry the French prince, for his mother, Catherine de' Medici, was suspected of ordering the St Bartholomew's Day massacre of tens of thousands of French Protestant Huguenots in 1572. Elizabeth bowed to public feeling against the marriage, learning from the mistake her sister, Mary I, made when she married Philip II of Spain, and sent the Duke of Anjou away. Elizabeth knew that the continuation of the Tudor line was now impossible; she was forty-eight in 1581, and too old to bear children.

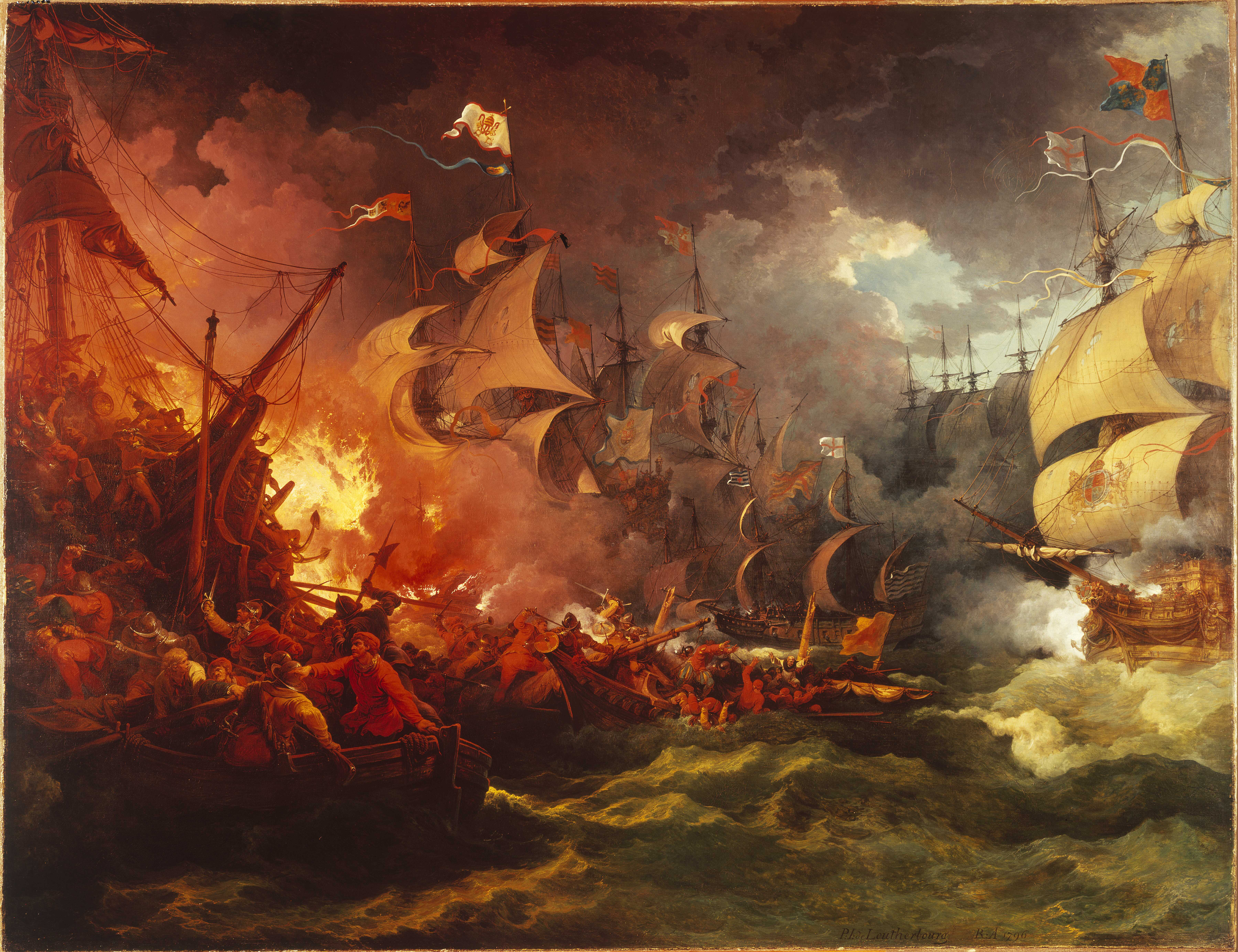
Defeat of the Spanish Armada by Philip James de Loutherbourg. The Spanish Armada: Catholic Spain's attempt to depose Elizabeth and take control of England in 1588

By far the most dangerous threat to the Tudor line during Elizabeth's reign was the Spanish Armada of 1588, launched by Elizabeth's old suitor Philip II of Spain and commanded by Alonso de Guzmán El Bueno, 7th Duke of Medina Sidonia. The Spanish invasion fleet outnumbered the English fleet's 22 galleons and 108 armed merchant ships. The Spanish lost, however, as a result of bad weather on the English Channel, poor planning and logistics, and the skills of Francis Drake and Charles Howard, 2nd Baron Howard of Effingham.

Mary, Queen of Scots was executed in 1587 after being implicated in Catholic plots against Elizabeth, which removed a Catholic alternative to her rule. Her death helped push Philip II to launch the Spanish Armada, which in 1588 was defeated by England's smaller, faster ships, the use of fireships, and bad weather. That summer at Tilbury, Elizabeth delivered her famous address; declaring she had "the body of a weak and feeble woman" but "the heart and stomach of a king", to rally the trained bands and strengthen her image as Gloriana.

While Elizabeth declined physically with age, her running of the country continued to benefit her people. In response to famine across England due to bad harvests in the 1590s, Elizabeth introduced the poor law, allowing peasants who were too ill to work a certain amount of money from the state. All the money Elizabeth had borrowed from Parliament in 12 of the 13 parliamentary sessions was paid back; by the time of her death, Elizabeth not only had no debts, but was in credit. Elizabeth died childless at Richmond Palace on 24 March 1603. She left behind a legacy and monarchy worth noting. She had pursued her goals of being well endowed with every aspect of ruling her kingdom, and of knowing everything necessary to be an effective monarch. She took part in law, economics, politics and governmental issues both domestic and abroad. Realms that had once been strictly forbidden to the female gender had now been ruled by one.

Elizabeth never named a successor. However, her chief minister William Cecil had corresponded with the Protestant King James VI of Scotland, great-grandson of Margaret Tudor, and James's succession to the English throne was unopposed. There has been discussion over the selected heir. It has been argued that Elizabeth would have selected James because she felt guilty about what happened to his mother, her cousin. Whether this is true is unknown for certain, for Elizabeth did her best to never show emotion nor give in to claims. Elizabeth was strong and hard-headed and kept her primary goal in sight: providing the best for her people and proving those wrong who doubted her while maintaining a straight composure.

The House of Tudor survives through the female line, first with the House of Stuart, which occupied the English throne for most of the following century, and then the House of Hanover, via James' granddaughter Sophia. King Charles III, a member of the House of Windsor, is a direct descendant of Henry VII.

== Rebellions against the Tudors ==
The following English rebellions took place against the House of Tudor:

- Yorkist risings against Henry VII (1486–1487)
  - The first was the Rebellion of the Stafford brothers and Viscount Lovell of 1486, which collapsed without fighting.
  - In 1487, Yorkists led by John, Earl of Lincoln rebelled in support of Lambert Simnel, a boy who was claimed to be the Earl of Warwick, son of Edward IV's brother Clarence (who had last been seen as a prisoner in the Tower). The rebellion began in Ireland, where the traditionally Yorkist nobility, headed by the powerful Gerald, Earl of Kildare, proclaimed Simnel King and provided troops for his invasion of England. The rebellion was defeated and Lincoln killed at the Battle of Stoke Field.
  - Yorkshire Rebellion (1489) — Rioting led by Sir John Egremont was suppressed by Thomas, Earl of Surrey but not before Henry, Earl of Northumberland was killed collecting taxes for the War in Brittany.
  - Cornish Rebellion (1497)
  - Second Cornish Uprising of 1497 — Perkin Warbeck, who claimed to be Richard, the younger of the "Princes in the Tower", landed in Cornwall with a few thousand troops, but was soon captured and executed in 1499.
- Rebellions against Henry VIII
  - The Amicable Grant Rebellion (1525)
  - The Pilgrimage of Grace (1536)
- Rebellions against Edward VI's "protectors"
  - The Western Rebellion or Prayer Book Rebellion (1549)
  - Kett's Rebellion (1549)
- Rebellions against Mary I
  - Wyatt's Rebellion (1554)
- Rebellions against Elizabeth I
  - The Rebellion of the Northern Earls (1569)
  - The Essex Rebellion (1601)

== Tudor monarchs of England and Ireland ==
The six Tudor monarchs were:

Portrait	Name	Birth	Accession date	Marriages	Death	Claim
	Henry VII	28 January 1457; Pembroke Castle	22 August 1485 (crowned at Westminster Abbey on 30 October 1485)	Elizabeth of York	21 April 1509; Richmond Palace aged 52	Right of Conquest. Descent from Edward III through his mother Lady Margaret Beaufort.
	Henry VIII (Note: To the Tudor period belongs the elevation of the English-ruled state in Ireland from a Lordship to a Kingdom (1541) under Henry VIII, who was the first King of Ireland.)	28 June 1491; Greenwich Palace	21 April 1509 (crowned at Westminster Abbey on 24 June 1509)	(1) Catherine of Aragon (2) Anne Boleyn (3) Jane Seymour (4) Anne of Cleves (5) Catherine Howard (6) Catherine Parr	28 January 1547; Palace of Whitehall aged 55	Son of Henry VII and Elizabeth of York
	Edward VI	12 October 1537; Hampton Court Palace	28 January 1547 (crowned at Westminster Abbey on 20 February 1547)	—	6 July 1553; Greenwich Palace aged 15	Son of Henry VIII and Jane Seymour
	Jane (disputed)	1537; Bradgate Park	10 July 1553 (never crowned)	Lord Guildford Dudley	12 February 1554 executed at the Tower of London aged 16–17	Granddaughter of Henry VIII's sister, Mary Brandon (née Tudor), Duchess of Suffolk; succeeded on the claim that Mary and Elizabeth were illegitimate, per Edward VI's will.
	Mary I	18 February 1516; Palace of Placentia	19 July 1553 (crowned at Westminster Abbey on 1 October 1553)	Philip II of Spain	17 November 1558; St James's Palace aged 42	Daughter of Henry VIII and Catherine of Aragon
	Elizabeth I	7 September 1533; Greenwich Palace	17 November 1558 (crowned at Westminster Abbey on 15 January 1559)	—	24 March 1603; Richmond Palace aged 69	Daughter of Henry VIII and Anne Boleyn

== Armorial ==
=== Before the succession ===

Earlier arms of the Tudors as Welsh noble house.

Coat of arms of Edmund Tudor, first Earl of Richmond. As he was the son of a princess of France and a minor Welsh Squire, the grant of these arms to him by his half-brother Henry VI recognises his status as part of the Lancastrian Royal Family.

Coat of arms of Jasper Tudor, Duke of Bedford, and Earl of Pembroke, brother of Edmund Tudor

=== Coat of arms as sovereigns ===

Coat of arms of Henry VII (1485–1509) & Henry VIII (1509–1547) in the first part of his reign

Coat of arms of Henry VIII (1509–1547) in the later part of his reign & Edward VI (1547–1553)

Coat of arms of Mary I (1554–1558) impaled with those of her husband, Philip II of Spain

Coat of arms Elizabeth I (1558–1603) with her personal motto: "Semper eadem" or "always the same"

As Prince of Wales, Arthur, Henry, and Edward all bore these arms,

Coat of arms of the Tudor Princes of Wales (1489–1547)

=== Tudor badges ===
The Welsh Dragon supporter honoured the Tudors' Welsh origins. The most popular symbol of the house of Tudor was the Tudor rose (see top of page). When Henry Tudor took the crown of England from Richard III in battle, he brought about the end of the Wars of the Roses between the House of Lancaster (whose badge was a red rose) and the House of York (whose badge was a white rose). He married Elizabeth of York to bring all factions together.

On his marriage, Henry adopted the Tudor Rose badge conjoining the White Rose of York and the Red Rose of Lancaster. It symbolised the Tudor's right to rule as well the uniting of the kingdom after the Wars of the Roses. It has been used by every English, then British, monarch since Henry VII as a royal badge.

Royal roses, badges of England showing the red rose of Lancaster, the white rose of York, and the combined Tudor rose.

Tudor rose, royal badge of England combining the red rose of Lancaster and white rose of York.

Tudor rose uncrowned.

Tudor dragon badge symbolizing the Tudor's Welsh heritage and the Welsh union with England.
Tudor portcullis badge taken from their Beaufort ancestors.
Crowned Fleur de lys (Tudor crown) showing the claim to crown of France.
Crowned harp of Ireland (Tudor crown) showing the Tudors as Kings of Ireland. The harp was later quartered into the royal arms.

=== Tudor monograms ===
The Tudors also used monograms to denote themselves:

Royal monogram of King Henry VIII of England.

Royal monogram of Queen Elizabeth I of England.

== Lineage and the Tudor name ==
=== The Tudor name ===
As noted above Tewdur or Tudor is derived from the words tud "territory" and rhi "king". Owen Tudor took it as a surname on being knighted. It is doubtful whether the Tudor kings used the name on the throne. Kings and princes were not seen as needing a name, and a "Tudor" name for the royal family was hardly known in the sixteenth century. The royal surname was never used in official publications, and hardly in 'histories' of various sorts before 1584. ... Monarchs were not anxious to publicise their descent in the paternal line from a Welsh adventurer, stressing instead continuity with the historic English and French royal families. Their subjects did not think of them as 'Tudors', or of themselves as 'Tudor people'". Princes and Princesses would have been known as "of England". The medieval practice of colloquially calling princes after their place birth (e.g. Henry of Bolingbroke for Henry IV or Henry of Monmouth for Henry V) was not followed. Henry VII was likely known as "Henry of Richmond" before his taking of the throne. When Richard III called him "Henry Tudor" it was to stress his Welshness and his unfitness for the throne as opposed to himself, "Richard Plantagenet", a "true" descendant of the royal line.

=== Patrilineal descent ===
The Penmynydd family and their relatives
Disteiniaid of the Kingdom of Gwynedd Members of the Penmynydd family Members of the House of Tudor

Tangwystl ferch Llywarch	Ednyfed Fychan d. 1246	Gwenllian ferch Rhys d. 1236	Einion ap Gwalchmai fl. 1202–1223
Llywelyn ab Ednyfed	Tudur ab Ednyfed d. c. 1281	Gruffudd ab Ednyfed Fychan d. c. 1256	Goronwy ab Ednyfed Fychan d. 1268	Angharad ferch Ednyfed	Einion Fychan ab Einion
Rhys ap Llywelyn	Heilin ap Tudur fl. 1246–1282	Rhys Hen ap Gruffudd d. 1284	Tudur Hen ap Goronwy d. 1311	Dafydd ab Einion Fychan d. c. 1282
Gwilym ap Rhys	Gruffudd ap Heilin d. c. 1340	Gruffudd Llwyd ap Rhys d. 1335	Goronwy ap Tudur Hen d. 1331	Tomos ap Llewelyn d. 1343
Ardudful ferch Gwilym	Gwilym ap Gruffudd d. c. 1370	Hywel ap Goronwy d. c. 1367	Tudur ap Goronwy d. c. 1367	Marged ferch Tomos	Elen ferch Tomos	Gruffudd Fychan II
Dafydd Llwyd ap Gwilym Gam d. c. 1350–1380	Gruffudd ap Gwilym d. 1405	Goronwy Fychan ap Tudur d. 1382	Rhys ap Tudur executed 1412	Ednyfed ap Tudur d. 1382	Gwilym ap Tudur d. 1413	Maredudd ap Tudur d. 1406	Owain Glyndŵr d. c. 1416
Gwilym ap Gruffudd d. 1431	Morfudd ferch Goronwy	Owen Tudor c. 1400–1461
Tudur Fychan	Edmund Tudor c. 1430–1456; 1st Earl of Richmond	Jasper Tudor, Duke of Bedford; 1431–1495	David Owen
Owain ap Tudur d. 1504/1505	Henry VII; 1457–1509; King of England
William ab Owain d. 1523?	John ab Owain	Richard ab Owain d. 1527 (?)	Arthur; 1486–1502; Prince of Wales	Henry VIII; 1491–1547; King of England
Richard Owen d. 1558	William Bold	Edward VI; 1537–1553; King of England	Mary I 1516–1558; Queen of England	Elizabeth I 1533–1603; Queen of England
Richard Owen Theodor (III)	David Owen Theodor d. 1624
Richard Owen Theodor (IV) fl. 1645
Richard Owen Theodor (V) fl. 1665
Richard Owen Theodor (VI) fl. 1669

=== Royal lineage ===
The Tudors' claim to the throne combined the Lancastrian claim in their descent from the Beauforts and the Yorkist claim by the marriage of Henry VII to the heiress of Edward IV.

Royal Lineage (Simplified)
– King of England – Scottish Royal Family
– House of Lancaster – House of York
– House of Tudor – Tudor king or queen of England

Edward III; 1327–1377
^{(1st son)} Edward the Black Prince; Prince of Wales	Blanche of Lancaster	^{(3rd son)} John of Gaunt; Duke of Lancaster	Katherine; Swynford	^{(2nd son)} Lionel of Antwerp; Duke of Clarence	^{(4th son)} Edmund of Langley; 1st Duke of York	^{(5th son)} Thomas of Woodstock Duke of Gloucester
Richard II of England; 1377–1399	Henry IV of England; 1399–1413	Charles VI of France	Maredudd ap Tudur	John Beaufort; 1st Earl of Somerset	Philippa; 5th Countess of Ulster
Henry V of England; 1413–1422	Catherine of Valois	Owen Tudor	John Beaufort; 1st Duke of Somerset	Roger; Mortimer; 4th Earl of March	Edmund; Mortimer; 5th Earl of March
Henry VI of England; 1422–1461; 1470–1471	Edmund Tudor; 1st Earl of Richmond	Margaret Beaufort, Countess of Richmond and Derby	Anne de Mortimer	^{(2nd son)} Richard; 3rd Earl of Cambridge	^{(1st son)} Edward; 2nd Duke of York
Edward of Westminster; Prince of Wales	Richard; 3rd Duke of York
Edward IV of England; 1461–1470 & 1471–1483	Richard III of England; 1483–1485	George; 1st Duke of Clarence
Isabella I of Castile	Ferdinand II of Aragon	Henry VII of England; 1485–1509	Elizabeth of York	Edward V of England; 1483	Richard of Shrewsbury; Duke of York	Edward of Middleham; Prince of Wales	Margaret Pole; Countess of Salisbury
Joanna of Castile	Maria of Aragon	Catherine of Aragon	^{(2nd son)} Henry VIII of England; 1509–1547	^{(1st son)} Arthur; Prince of Wales	Margaret; Tudor	Mary; Tudor	Reginald; Pole
Charles V Holy Roman; Emperor	Isabella of Portugal	Mary I of England; 1553–1558	Elizabeth I of England; 1558–1603	Edward VI of England; 1547–1553	James V of Scotland	Lady; Frances; Brandon
Philip II of Spain (King of England jure uxoris 1554–1558)	Mary; Queen of Scots	Lady; Jane Grey
James VI of Scotland and I of England; 1603–1625

== In popular culture ==
Numerous feature films are based on Tudor history. Queen Elizabeth I has been a particular favorite for filmmakers for generations. According to Elizabeth A. Ford and Deborah C. Mitchell, images of Elizabeth I move: "fast-forward across film history, unforgettable, iconic images: the stately bearing; the red wigs; the high forehead; the long, aristocratic nose; the alabaster makeup; the pearl-drop earrings; the stiff, ornate ruffs; the fingers dripping with jewels; and the gowns, with yards and yards of white satin, purple velvet, gold, and silver ornamented and sparkling with rubies, diamonds, and more pearls. Even a schoolchild would be hard-pressed to mistake her for any other monarch."

- The Private Lives of Elizabeth and Essex (1939), film starring Bette Davis, Errol Flynn and Olivia de Havilland
- A Man for All Seasons, a play by Robert Bolt produced for radio, television and stage which premiered in 1960
  - A Man for All Seasons (1966 film)
  - A Man for All Seasons (1988 film)
- Anne of the Thousand Days (1969), British costume drama
- BBC Drama Miniseries Trilogy on the Tudor Dynasty:
  - The Shadow of the Tower (1972) – Focuses on Henry VII and Elizabeth of York after his victory at Bosworth Field, and their efforts to establish their dynasty and thwart plots against their rule.
  - The Six Wives of Henry VIII (1970) – A six-episode series, each focusing on one of Henry VIII's wives, exploring their fates and relationships with the king and his advisors from their perspectives.
  - Elizabeth R (1971) – Covers Elizabeth I's reign, starting with the end of Edward VI's rule, with a focus on Mary I in the first episode, and briefly depicting Lady Jane Grey's imprisonment.
- Elizabeth (1998), film starring Cate Blanchett
  - Elizabeth: The Golden Age (2007), sequel
- The Other Boleyn Girl (2001), a historical novel by Philippa Gregory, based on Mary Boleyn, the sister of Queen Anne Boleyn
  - The Other Boleyn Girl (2003 film)
  - The Other Boleyn Girl (2008 film)
- Henry VIII (2003), a two-part British television serial starring Ray Winstone
- Elizabeth I (2005), television drama
- The Virgin Queen (2005), a BBC and Power co-production, four-part miniseries based upon the life of Queen Elizabeth I, starring Anne-Marie Duff
- The Tudors (2007–2010), a British-/Irish-/Canadian-produced historical fiction television series loosely based upon the reign of Henry VIII.
- The King's Daughter: A Novel of the First Tudor Queen (2008), by Sandra Worth, chronicles the origins of Tudor rule.
- Reign (TV series) (2013–2017), a four-season television series that is loosely based on the life of Mary, Queen of Scots and in later seasons, Elizabeth I of England.
- The White Princess (2017), an eight-episode series produced by Starz based on the novel by Philippa Gregory, which centers on the early reign of Henry VII and his Queen Elizabeth of York after his victory at the Battle of Bosworth, and the beginning of the Tudor period.
- Horrible Histories: Terrible Tudors
- The 2017 musical Six is inspired by the stories of Henry VIII's six wives.
- The 50-year special episode of Doctor Who "The Day of the Doctor" features Elizabeth I as one of secondary characters.
- Wolf Hall, Bring Up the Bodies and The Mirror & the Light: a trilogy of novels by Hilary Mantel, the first two of which were also adapted as Wolf Hall (TV series), which portray the dynastic, political and religious upheavals of the first part of the reign of Henry VIII from the viewpoint of Thomas Cromwell, for a time Henry's chief minister and adviser.

== See also ==
- England and Wales
- English Renaissance
- Mid-Tudor Crisis
- Richmond Castle
- Tudor architecture
- Tudor conquest of Ireland
- Tudor navy
- Tudor Revival architecture

Royal house House of Tudor
Preceded by House of York	Royal house of the Kingdom of England; 1485–1603	Succeeded by House of Stuart
