= Goronwy Fychan ap Tudur =

Welsh nobleman (died 1382)

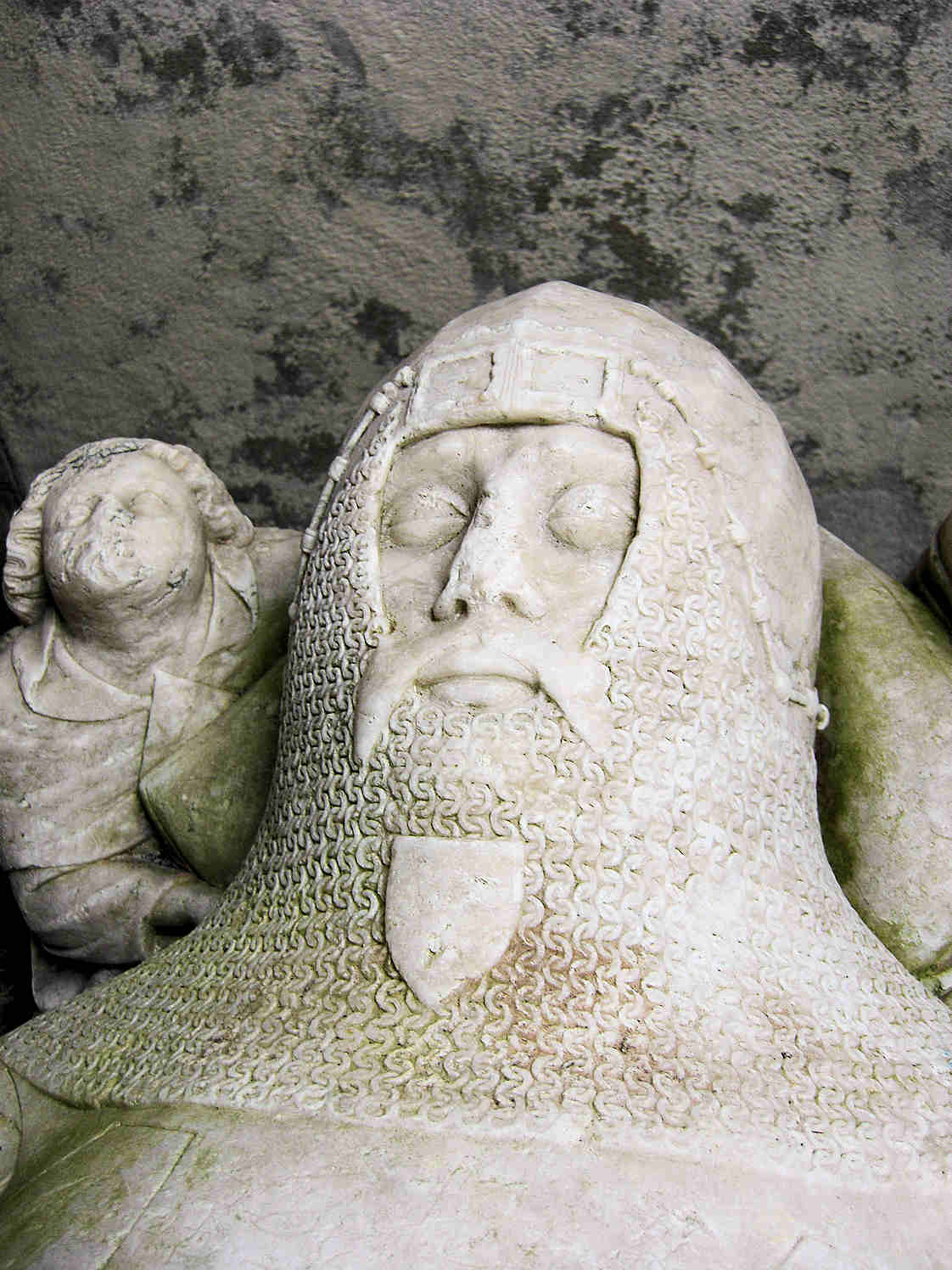
- Goronwy's effigy from his alabaster tomb in St Gredifael's Church, Penmynydd
- Died: 22 March 1382; Kent, England
- Cause of death: Drowning
- Buried: Llanfaes Friary, Llanfaes, Wales; St Gredifael's Church, Penmynydd, Wales (after the English Reformation)
- Noble family: Penmynydd family
- Spouse: Myfanwy Fychan
- Father: Tudur Fychan ap Goronwy

Goronwy Fychan ap Tudur (died 22 March 1382) was a soldier, administrator and an important member of the Tudors of Penmynydd, landowners who were under royal patronage.

Goronwy Fychan ap Tudur was the great-granduncle of Henry VII of England, and related to Owain Glyndŵr through his step-mother. He was the eldest son of Tudur Fychan ap Goronwy, and had 4 younger brothers. Goronwy was married to Myfanwy Fychan, the subject of a famous love-poem, while Goronwy himself was the patron of many important poets of the fourteenth century. He was a close associate of Richard II, and died by drowning together with his brother Ednyfed while crossing a river in Kent in 1382. This was four days after he had been made constable of Beaumaris Castle, one of the few Welshmen to be appointed to that position.

He was buried in the Franciscan friary at Llanfaes in Anglesey. The striking alabaster tomb was moved to St Gredifael's Church, Penmynydd after the dissolution of that house in 1537. His only son, Tudur, died before 1400. His daughter Morfudd married Gwilym ap Gruffudd.

== Works cited ==
- Lewis, Barry J., ed. (2023) [2003]. Gwaith Gruffudd ap Maredudd I: Canu i Deulu Penmynydd [The Work of Gruffudd ap Maredudd I: Singing to the Family of Penmynydd] (PDF). Cyfres Beirdd yr Uchelwyr (in Welsh). Vol. 24 (PDF ed.). Aberystwyth: Centre for Advanced Welsh and Celtic Studies. ISBN 978-0947531270. Archived from the original (PDF) on 29 March 2023.
- Carr, Antony D. (23 September 2004). "Tudor family, forebears of (1215-1404)". The Oxford Dictionary of National Biography. Oxford: Oxford University Press. doi:10.1093/ref:odnb/77357.
