= Gwilym ap Tudur =

- Born: c. late 14th century
- Died: 1413

Gwilym ap Tudur (died 1413) was a Welsh nobleman and a member of the Tudor family of Penmynydd. In 1401, he and his brother Rhys ap Tudur took Conwy Castle after infiltrating it, in support of their cousin Owain Glyndŵr. Gwilym was subsequently pardoned in 1413, following the execution of his brother a year earlier.

== Ancestry and early life ==
Gwilym was one of the sons of Tudur ap Goronwy alongside Ednyfed ap Tudor, Maredudd ap Tudur, Goronwy ap Tudor and Rhys ap Tudur. One of Tudur's wives, was Marged ferch Tomos, the maternal aunt of Owain Glyndŵr. The family were descended from Ednyfed Fychan, and his son Goronwy ab Ednyfed, the founder of the Tudor family of Penmynydd.

== Service to the crown ==
Along with his brother Rhys, Gwilym was one of the leaders of a Carmarthenshire contingent of soldiers which had been raised in 1386 as a precaution against a French invasion via Ireland. They were each made an esquire to King Richard II of England, and accompanied his forces to Ireland in 1394. In 1398 their military service was retained by Richard, being paid a £10 stipend each year. They also once again accompanied Richard's forces to Ireland that year.

== Revolt ==
In September 1399, King Richard II was overthrown by Henry IV. When Gwilym's cousin Owain Glyndŵr began a rebellion the following year, in 1400, he and his brothers backed him openly. While Owain's rebellion in North East Wales faltered, Rhys and his family rose up against the king on Anglesey in September of that year. Henry IV personally took an army to put down the revolt, and harried the island, burning the Franciscan Llanfaes Friary near Bangor, Gwynedd, where the Tudur family were buried.

When Henry issued a general pardon for those of North Wales in March 1401, he purposely excluded Gwilym, his brother Rhys and Owain Glyndŵr. As a result, the Tudur brothers began planning an attack on Conwy Castle. On Good Friday, 1 April 1401, the brothers and 44 men (which included those who had also been excluded from the pardons) infiltrated the castle. They had pretended to be carpenters, and captured the castle while the guard were in church. Negotiations began for the return of the castle on 13 April, with the king represented by Henry "Hotspur" Percy and Gwilym representing the Welsh forces. After seeking a compromise, which would have resulted in pardons being given to the Welshmen, the king overrode Percy's decision on 20 April. An agreement was finally reached on 24 June after several failed attempts when Gwilym began writing to the king directly, although several of the troops were executed as a result of the agreement. Gwilym, Rhys and Maredudd were outlawed by the king in 1406.

== Legacy ==
Rhys was executed in 1412, but Gwilym was given a full pardon a year later. Both their lands had been forfeited when they joined with Owain's rebellion and passed to Gwilym ap Gruffydd, who had married Morfudd, the daughter of Goronwy ap Tudur.

=== Lineage ===
Tudors of Penmynydd

Ednyfed Fychan d. 1246
I (Note: Peter Bartrum. "Marchudd 11". Prosiect Bartrum/Bartrum Project. Aberystwyth University.)	Tudur ab Ednyfed	Goronwy ab Ednyfed d. 1268
II (Note: Peter Bartrum. "Marchudd 12". Prosiect Bartrum/Bartrum Project. Aberystwyth University.)	Tudur Hen (Tudur ap Goronwy) d. 1311
III (Note: Peter Bartrum. "Bleddyn ap Cynfyn 05". Prosiect Bartrum/Bartrum Project. Aberystwyth University.)	Goronwy ap Tudur Hen d. 1331	Tomos ap Llewelyn d. 1343
IV (Note: Peter Bartrum. "Marchudd 13". Prosiect Bartrum/Bartrum Project. Aberystwyth University.) (Note: Peter Bartrum. "Rhys ap Tewdwr 07". Prosiect Bartrum/Bartrum Project. Aberystwyth University.)	Hywel ap Goronwy d. ca. 1367	Tudur ap Goronwy d. ca. 1367	Marged ferch Tomos	Elen ferch Tomos (mother of Owain Glyndŵr)
V	Goronwy ap Tudur d. 1382	Rhys ap Tudur ex. 1412	Ednyfed ap Tudur d. 1382	Gwilym ap Tudur d. 1413	Maredudd ap Tudur d. 1406
VI	Gwilym ap Griffith (Griffiths of Penrhyn)	Morfydd ferch Goronwy	Tudur ap Goronwy d. ca. 1400	Sir Owen Tudor (Owain Tudur) (ca. 1400–1461)
VII	Tudur Fychan	Edmund Tudor, 1st Earl of Richmond (ca. 1430–1456)	Jasper Tudor, Duke of Bedford (1431–1495)	Sir David Owen
VIII	Owain Tudor d. 1504/1505	Henry VII of England (1457–1509)
IX	William Owen ap Tudor Fychan	John Owen ap Tudor Fychan	Richard Owen Theodor (I) d. 1527(?)	Arthur (1486–1502)	Henry VIII (1491–1547)
X	Richard Owen Theodor (II) d. 1558(?)	William Pritchard (William Bold)	Edward VI (1537–1553)	Mary I (1516–1558)	Elizabeth I (1533–1603)
XI	Richard Owen Theodor (III)	David Owen; Theodor d. 1624
XII	Richard Owen Theodor (IV) fl. 1645
XIII	Richard Owen Theodor (V) fl. 1665
XIV	Richard Owen Theodor (VI) fl. 1669
