= Tudur Hen ap Goronwy =

Welsh aristocrat and administrator (died 1311)

- Died: 1311
- Buried: Bangor, Caernarfonshire, Wales
- Noble family: Penmynydd family
- Spouse: Anghared ferch Ithel Fychan
- Issue: Goronwy ap Tudur Hen; Madog ap Tudur Hen; Hywel ap Tudur Hen
- Father: Goronwy ab Ednyfed
- Mother: Morfudd ferch Meurig

Tudur Hen ap Goronwy was a Welsh aristocrat and administrator. He was one of three sons of Goronwy ab Ednyfed who received lands from King Edward I of England. Nonetheless, he backed the rebellion of Madog ap Llywelyn, but afterwards swore allegiance to both Edward I and his son, Edward of Caernarfon. Tudur Hen was responsible for the restoration of the Franciscan friary at Bangor, where his body was later placed on 11 October 1311.

== Ancestry and family ==
His father Goronwy ab Ednyfed (d. 1268) was seneschal to Llywelyn ap Gruffudd (also known as Llywelyn the Last), the King of Gwynedd by 1258, continuing in the role until his death on 12 October 1268. In that role, Goronwy had followed in the footsteps of his father, Ednyfed Fychan, and by doing so had tied the fortunes of the early House of Tudor to those of Llywelyn. Goronwy led Llywelyn's military forces, and in February 1263 he took them as far south as Gwent in action against the Marcher Lords. Goronwy and Marudd had 3 sons, Tudur ap Goronwy, Goronwy ap Goronwy (also known as Goronwy the Younger or Goronwy Fychan) and Hywel ap Goronwy. Tudur Hen was not the first member of the family to be named Tudur: he was preceded by his uncle, Tudur ab Ednyfed, who had been in the service of the previous Prince of Wales, Dafydd ap Llywelyn.

== Service to the English crown and rebellion ==
In September 1278, King Edward I of England granted lands to Tudur and his brothers. The majority of the noble houses in Wales sided with the Welsh forces during the English invasion of Gwynedd, but Edward proclaimed that any who joined him would retain their lands and titles under the English crown. Tudur Hen retained his prestige and lands after the death of Llywelyn in 1282 and the victory of the English. Tudur and his brother Goronwy were two of those lords who backed the rebellion of Madog ap Llywelyn against the English in 1294–95. Tudur acted as steward to Madog, while Goronwy was in his service.

Tudur and Goronwy were two of three men who witnessed the Madog's charter, known as the Penmachno Document, in 1294 which granted lands in Ardudwy and Llansannan to Bleddyn Fychan. After the revolt failed, Tudur was among those lords from North Wales who pledged their loyalty to Edward in person in 1296, and again to Edward of Caernarfon when he was invested as Prince of Wales in 1301.

Tudur Hen has since the 18th century been historically credited with the construction of the Franciscan Llanfaes Friary near Bangor, but it actually pre-dated him. Llanfaes Friary is where Princesses of Wales, Joan, Lady of Wales and Eleanor de Montfort, Princess of Wales, the wives of Llywelyn ap Iorwerth and Llywelyn ap Gruffydd respectively, were interred. It has been proposed that Tudur was responsible for rebuilding the site around 1293 after it was damaged. He arranged to be interred in the south wall of the site.

He acted as an official representative for the English Royal Family in the Perfeddwlad territories. Tudur used the English property laws, which he found more advantageous in his position than those used by the Welsh, as they allowed for inheritance of lands by a single party. He continued to hold the lands in North Wales and Cardiganshire which he had inherited. Upon his death in 1311, his holdings passed to his son Goronwy ap Tudur Hen. He had two further sons, Madog and Hywel. Tudur Hen was interned in Bangor Priory on 11 October 1311; his son, Goronwy, was also placed there on 11 December 1331 following his death.

== Legacy ==
Tudur Hen's most significant legacy was his name. The naming practice of the time in Wales was to attach the father's name to the new first name, thus his son was named Goronwy ap Tudur Hen. Tudur Hen and his wife Anghared fil Ithel Fychan had children, one of whom was named Tudur, becoming another Tudur ap Goronwy. The younger Tudur was noticed by King Edward III of England and was made a knight in his service, and he was the grandfather (through Maredudd ap Tudur) of Owain ap Maredudd ap Tudur. Owain anglicised his name to become Owen Tudor, and was the grandfather of King Henry VII of England, the founder of the Royal House of Tudor.
