= Penmynydd family =

Welsh noble family

Arms of Owen Tudor. Other branches of the Tudors of Penmynydd are reported using the same design with different tinctures, for example with an ermine or black chevron.

The Penmynydd family or the Tudors of Penmynydd (Welsh: Tuduriaid Penmynydd) were a noble and aristocratic family, connected with the village of Penmynydd in Anglesey, North Wales, who were very influential in Welsh (and later English) politics. From this family arose Sir Owen Tudor and thereby the Tudor dynasty, that ruled the Kingdom of England from 1485 to 1603. The Tudor dynasty ended in the early 17th century with the death of Elizabeth I.

== Origin and early generations ==
The family descended from one of the sons of Ednyfed Fychan (died in 1246), the Welsh warrior who became seneschal to the Kingdom of Gwynedd in north Wales, serving Llywelyn the Great and later his son Dafydd ap Llywelyn. He claimed descent from Marchudd ap Cynan, Lord of Rhos and 'protector' of Rhodri the Great, king of Gwynedd, a founder of one of the so-called Fifteen Tribes of Wales.

From Ednyfed's many sons would come a 'ministerial aristocracy' in northern Wales. He left the manors of Tre-castell, Penmynydd and Erddreiniogin, Anglesey to those of his sons born to his second marriage to Gwenllian, daughter of king Rhys ap Gruffydd of Deheubarth; among these sons was Goronwy (died 1268), founder of the line of the Penmynydd family.

Goronwy served as seneschal of the last Gwynedd king, Llywelyn ap Gruffudd. One of his sons, Tudur Hen (died 1311) would eventually submit to Edward I of England, and founded a Carmelite House of the White Friars in Bangor. In the next generation, Goronwy ap Tudur Hen (died 1331), likewise a patron of White Friars, was the father of Hywel ap Goronwy, Archdeacon of Anglesey, and of Sir Tudur ap Goronwy (died about 1367). They held Trecastell, along with a share of Penmynydd and Erddreiniog in Anglesey, plus lands in Cardiganshire.

== Owain Glyndŵr era ==
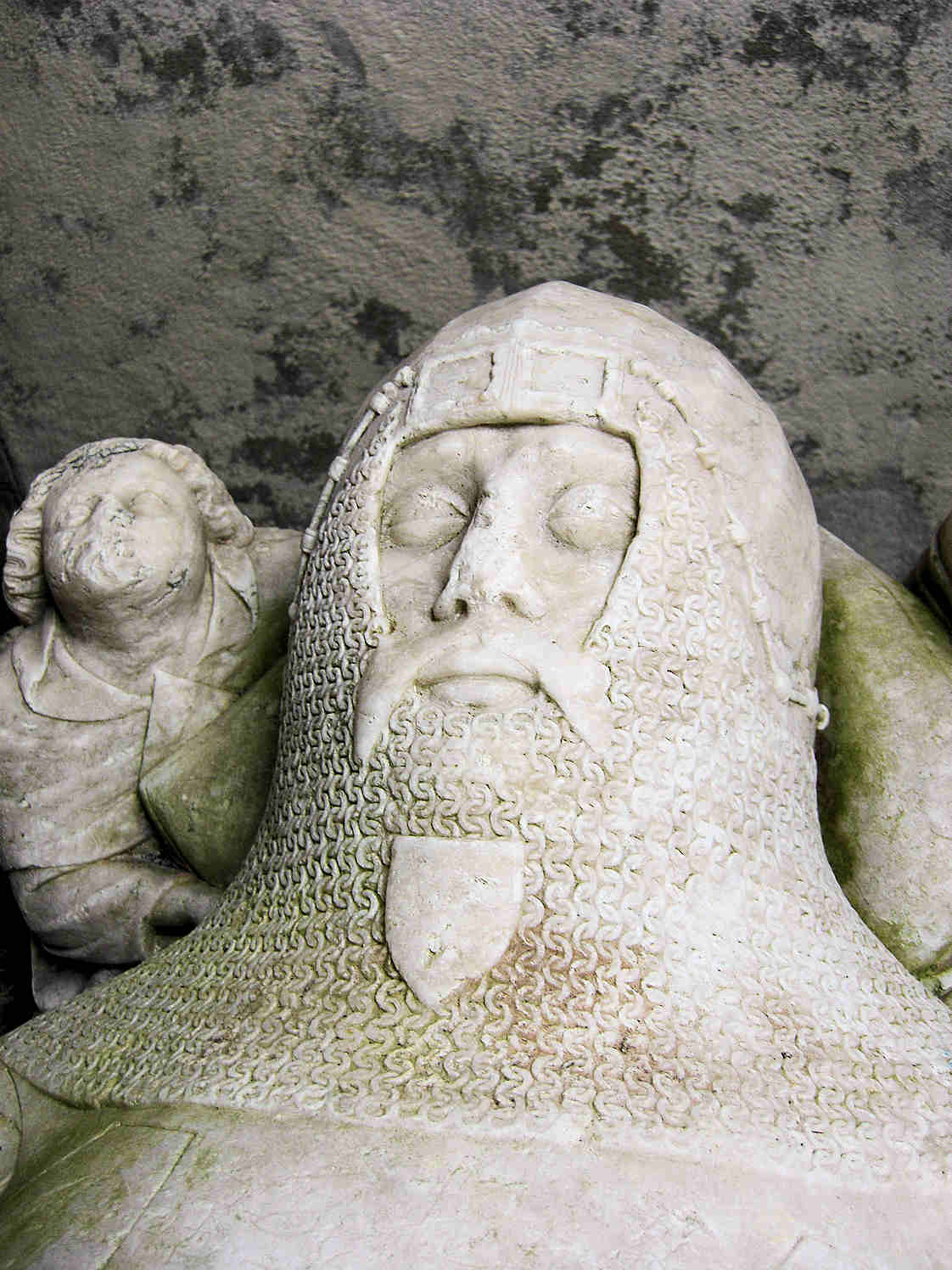
Tomb effigy of Goronwy ap Tudur, d. 1382, at St Gredifael, Penmynydd

The sons of Sir Tudur, eldest brother Goronwy Fychan ap Tudur, Forester of Snowdon and Constable of Beaumaris Castle, and his younger brothers Rhys ap Tudur and Gwilym ap Tudur, were among the personal retinue of Richard II of England. However, following that king's overthrow, Rhys, Gwilym and another brother, Maredudd ap Tudur, gave their allegiance to the rebel Owain Glyndŵr, a nephew of one of their father's wives and descendant of the earlier native Welsh princes. Rhys was executed in 1412 at Chester, and following Glyndŵr's demise much of the family's lands were taken by the English crown. The majority were then regranted to another branch of Ednyfed Fychan's lineage, the Griffiths of Penrhyn, whose head, Gwilym ap Griffith, had married Goronwy's daughter, Morfydd.

== Tudor dynasty ==
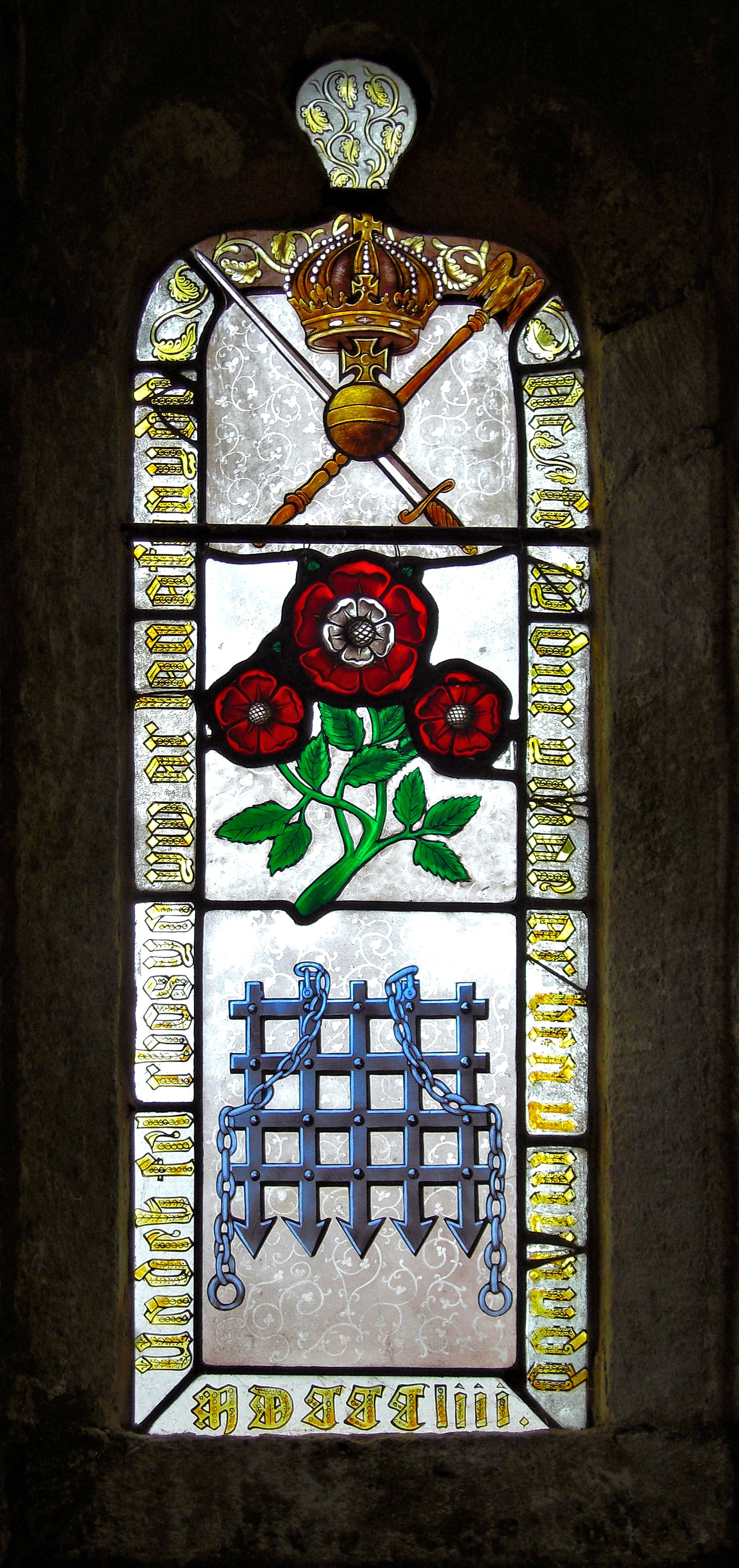
The stained glass window at Penmynydd.

The family is best known due to the descendants of a younger son. Owain Tudur (anglicised to Owen Tudor), the son of rebel Maredudd ap Tudor, became a courtier, and secretly married Catherine of Valois, widowed Queen Consort of the Lancastrian King Henry V. Owen Tudor and Catherine of Valois had two sons, Edmund Tudor, 1st Earl of Richmond (d. 1456), and Jasper Tudor, Duke of Bedford and Earl of Pembroke (d. 1495). Edmund Tudor was betrothed and married to Margaret Beaufort (1443–1509) daughter of John Beaufort, 1st Duke of Somerset, a scion of the House of Lancaster. Edmund and Margaret had a sole son, Henry Tudor, born 28 January 1457 at Pembroke Castle in Wales. He was born posthumously, Edmund Tudor having died 1 or 3 November 1456. Henry Tudor grew up in south Wales and, following the downfall of the Lancastrian cause, in exile in Brittany. Henry's mother Margaret forged an alliance of dispossessed Lancastrians and discontented Yorkists, most notably Elizabeth Woodville, widow of King Edward IV, in support of her son, who landed in South Wales, gathered further troops through Wales and the Midlands and ultimately defeated Richard III at Battle of Bosworth on 22 August 1485, Henry proclaiming himself Henry VII, King of England, on the battlefield.

After the battle, Henry VII married Elizabeth of York, the daughter of King Edward IV, granddaughter of Richard Plantagenet, 3rd Duke of York and the eldest surviving heir of the House of York and sister of the Princes in the Tower, Edward V and Richard of Shrewsbury, Duke of York. Henry and Elizabeth would have a long and happy marriage, having two sons who survived infancy, Arthur, Prince of Wales, who died in 1502 at the age of fifteen, and Henry, perhaps the most famed of Tudor monarchs. Henry VII and Elizabeth also had daughters, Margaret, queen consort of Scotland, and Mary, wife of Louis XII of France. Queen Elizabeth of York died in 1503 after giving birth to their last child Katherine, who did not survive. Henry VII died in 1509; his son Henry took the throne as King Henry VIII.

Henry VIII eventually married his brother Arthur's widow Catherine of Aragon; they had only one surviving child, the future Mary I. After nearly twenty five years of marriage, Henry, with much trouble and causing much unrest, had his marriage to Catherine annulled, claiming the marriage as unlawful due to her being the widow of his brother, and splitting with the Roman Catholic Church in the process. This action brought about the birth of the English Reformation, and the eventual beginning of the Church of England. Henry then married his pregnant mistress Anne Boleyn on 28 May 1533. Anne gave birth to a daughter, the future Elizabeth I the following 7 September. On 19 May 1536, Henry had Anne executed for treason and adultery. Henry then married Jane Seymour on 30 May 1536, and she gave birth to a son, Edward, on 12 October 1537, but Jane died of a postpartum infection on 24 October. Henry VIII married three subsequent women: Anne of Cleves in January 1540, a marriage which was annulled soon after, Catherine Howard in July 1540, who would be executed for adultery, then Katherine Parr in July 1543. She would survive Henry and go on to raise Elizabeth before her death in 1548.

After Henry VIII's death, his son assumed the throne as Edward VI, with his uncle Edward Seymour as Lord Protector. Edward died on 6 July 1553. Before his death, he had specified his succession, naming as his heir the teenage Lady Jane Grey. A granddaughter of Henry VIII's sister Mary, she had recently wed the son of Edward's chief minister, John Dudley, Duke of Northumberland. She was thus given precedence over Edward's half-sisters, Mary and Elizabeth, both declared illegitimate by their father's Second Act of Succession but readmitted to the succession by his will, which also bypassed the descendants of Henry's older sister, Margaret, in favor of those of her younger sister, Jane's grandmother Mary. Jane was proclaimed queen immediately following Edward's death, but Northumberland could not maintain her position against a groundswell of support for the dead king's half-sister as rightful heir, and Mary I was in turn proclaimed queen nine days later. She would be remembered as Bloody Mary for her ruthless persecution of Protestants during her reign. Mary married her cousin Philip II of Spain, but she died without issue in November 1558. The throne then went to Elizabeth I, Henry's daughter by Anne Boleyn, who would reign for forty five years. Elizabeth never married and had no issue, so the Tudor dynasty died with her in 1603. In total, five Tudor monarchs ruled England for 118 years, but issues around the Royal succession (including marriage, divorce, and the succession rights of women) became major political themes during the Tudor era. Elizabeth would be succeeded by her cousin, James VI of Scotland, who was doubly great-grandson of the excluded sister of Henry VIII, Margaret. Through him, the later English monarchs would carry Tudor blood.

== Second line ==
Following Glyndŵr's rebellion, the family's few remaining Penmynydd lands continued to be held by a line descended from the senior brother, Goronwy ap Tudur, who died 23 March 1382 leaving a minor son, Tudur, and a daughter Morfydd, wife of Gwilym ap Griffith of Penrhyn. Gwilym acted as guardian for his young brother-in-law, and following the latter's death, the lands passed into his own hands. After Morfydd's death, Gwilym had remarried to an English wife and would adjust the inheritance to pass most of his family properties to her sons. However, he also had a son by Morfydd, Tudur ap Gwilym, whose descendants would hold Penmynydd and retain a special status as recognized kin of the Tudor monarchs. His son, Owain, would take the surname Tudor. (Note: Traditional pedigrees show the father of this Owain Tudor to have been Tudur, son of Gwilym by Goronwy's daughter. Williams presented several reasons to question this, and while recognizing it would entail long generational chronology he instead suggests that Owain was son of Goronwy's own heir, Tudur, a placement accepted by several Welsh historians, including Pierce in Dictionary of Welsh Biography, and early work by Glyn Roberts. However, documentary evidence showing Penmynydd in the hands of Tudor ap Gwilym along with the unreasonable chronology of Williams' pedigree led Glyn Roberts to later reject that reconstruction, though he raised the possibility that the still-long chronology may indicate an additional generation between Owain Tudor and Tudor ap Gwilym.) He had three sons, William, John and Richard Owen ap Tudor Fychan, the last eventually being the heir to the family in Penmynydd; he later appears as Richard Owen Theodor (or Theodore). He was followed at Penmynydd by a son and grandson both named Richard, one of whom would serve as Sheriff of Anglesey in 1565 and 1573. (Note: The use of the same name in successive generations has given rise to disagreement over which in the sequence should be identified with the Sheriff.) The third Richard was succeeded by his brother David Owen Theodor (died 1624), whose own son Richard served as Sheriff of Anglesey in 1623. He was father of another Richard Owen Theodor, the fifth, born 27 May 1611, who became Sheriff in 1657 and died in 1665. His son, the last Richard Owen Theodor (1645–1669), died without issue. This last Richard's immediate heiress was his sister Margaret Owen Theodor, wife of Coningsby Williams of Glan-y-gor, and after her childless death Penmynydd passed through her aunt, Mary Owen Theodor, wife of Rowland Bulkeley of Porthamel, to their son Francis, whose dissolute ways forced him to sell the inheritance to a Bulkeley cousin.
