= Myfanwy Fychan =

Myfanwy Fychan was a Welsh noblewoman, born in the mid-14th century, who was involved in a famous romance with a bard.

Her story has inspired poem and song.

She was married to Goronwy Fychan ap Tudur.

== History ==
Only one poem by the poet Hywel ab Einion Llygliw has survived, but among the most famous work is an ode to Myfanwy Fychan "of Castell Dinas Brân":

Lliw eiry cynnar pen Aran,
Lloer bryd, lwys fryd o lys Frân.

[the] colour of the early snow on the top of Aran,
with the countenance of the moon, from the court of Brân

Castell Dinas Brân was in ruins by the time the poem was written, but it seems that Myfanwy ferch Iorwerth Ddu was the girl that Hywel was writing about. Myfanwy married Goronwy Fychan ap Tudur, and she is the subject of many poems written by her husband as well as poets. The fact that Hywel ab Einion's poem is titled "Ode to Myfanwy Fychan of Castell Dinas Brân" suggests that title was written later than the poem itself, and that the poem was written before Myfanwy married. It is however also possible that the music belongs to the amour courtois tradition of singing to married women.

The alabaster tombstone of Goronwy Fychan, who died in 1382, along with a statue of him and his wife, can be found in the parish church of Penmynydd.

== Romanticism of the 19th century ==
The text of the poem by Hywel ab Einion Llygliw was printed in The Myvyrian Archaiology of Wales which brought it to national prominence. A translation by Thomas Pennant ensured that it was well-known to historians and antiquarians in Wales and beyond.

The poem was the inspiration for the popular poem Myfanwy Fychan by John Ceiriog Hughes. It was composed for the Llangollen Eisteddfod in 1858 and was published for the first time two years later in the book Oriau'r Hwyr (The Late Hours). It is a typical Victorian poem, which describes a very lyrical and lovelorn Hywel ab Einion and Myfanwy Fychan. In the poem, the qualities and features of the fair maiden are extolled in a deliberate response to the damning report on the Welsh morality contained within the contemporary Reports of the Commissioners of Inquiry into the State of Education in Wales, commonly in Wales the Treason of the Blue Books.

The words were put to music by Joseph Parry and published under the title Myfanwy, which went on to become one of the most popular Welsh songs ever.

== Bibliography ==
- W. J. Gruffydd, Ceiriog (1939)
- Rhiannon Ifans (gol.), Gwaith Gruffudd Llwyd a'r Llygliwiaid eraill (Aberystwyth, 2000).
