= Gwilym ap Gruffudd =

Gwilym ap Griffith
- Born: c. late 14th century
- Died: 1431
- Occupation: Landowner
- Spouse(s): Morfudd ferch Goronwy; Joan

Gwilym ap Griffith (died 1431), also known as Gwilym ap Gruffydd, was a Welsh landowner. He briefly lent his support to Owain Glyndŵr in the Glyndŵr Rising. When his loyalty returned to the Crown, he was granted the lands of number of Glyndŵr supporters and by the end of his life had ownership of the majority of the lands previously held by the Tudors of Penmynydd.

== Early life ==
Gwilym ap Griffith was the oldest son of Griffith ap Gwilym and Generys ferch Madog. The family was descended from the 12th-/13th-century Welsh magnate and dynastic founder Ednyfed Fychan.

== Rebellion and land ownership ==
Gwilym ap Gruffydd married back into the Tudors line, through Morfudd ferch Goronwy, the daughter of Goronwy ap Tudur, head of the Tudors of Penmynydd and a distant kinsman of Gwilym. Unlike his other family members, he had avoided becoming involved in Owain Glyndŵr's revolt, but lent his support in 1402. He remarried in 1405, to Joan, a daughter of Sir William Stanley from Hooton, Cheshire. This was withdrawn by November 1407, when his forfeited lands were restored to him by the King. Gwilym ap Gruffydd was granted additional lands forfeited after the declaration of support by his first wife's uncles, Rhys ap Tudur and Gwilym ap Tudur, for Owain Glyndŵr in the Glyndŵr Rising against King Henry IV of England. These were the confiscated lands from Rhys and Gwilym ap Tudur, although he did not receive the lands held by a third brother, Maredudd ap Tudur.

These land grants were in addition to those held by a further 25 landowners. He was later also given the lands of his brother-in-law, Tudur ap Goronwy. For a brief while, Gwilym ap Gruffydd and his family lived at the historical Tudur estate in Penmynydd, Anglesey, before moving the family seat to Penrhyn Bay. By the end of his life, Gwilym ap Gruffydd's lands in Anglesey and Caernarfonshire were generating an income of more than £112 per year. The lands included those around the Menai Strait on Anglesey and the commote of Dindaethwy, and the majority of the lands previously held by various members of the Tudor family.

== Descendants ==
The descendants of Gwilym ap Gruffydd served in the households of the Tudor Kings Henry VII and Henry VIII of England. However, they did not rise to the same level of prominence in local affairs as the former landowners. They came to be known as the Anglesey Tudors, and were also referred to as the Theodores. They did not live on Anglesey, and were not written about by famous poets of their day.
