= Katherine Edgcumbe =

English aristocrat and courtier (died 1553)

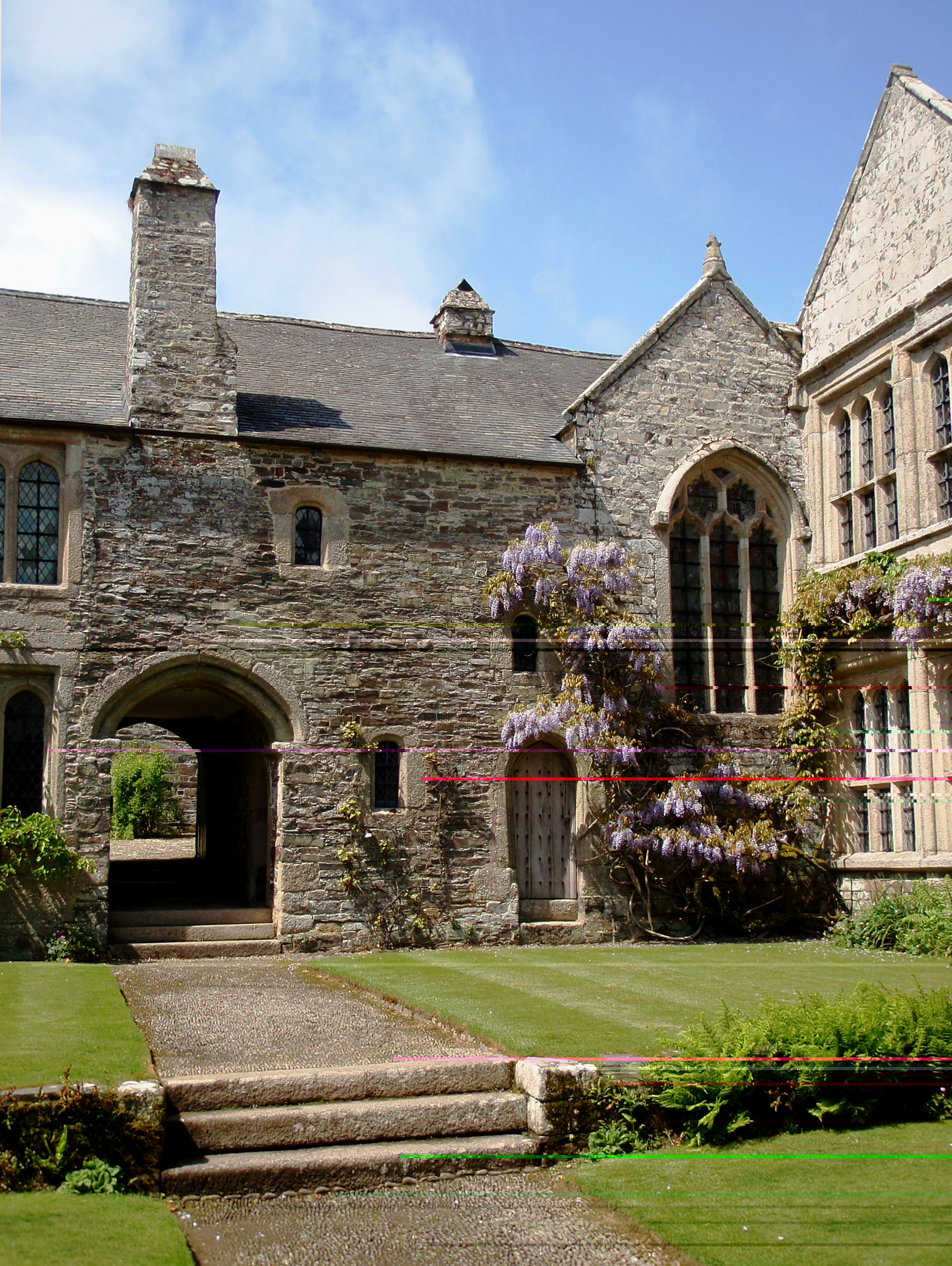
Cotehele, Katherine Edgcumbe's home in Cornwall

Katherine Edgecombe (died 1553) was an English aristocrat and courtier.

== Background ==
She was born Katherine St. John, a daughter of John St. John of Bletsoe and Sybil, a daughter or cousin of Rhys ap Morgan. She was the sister of John St. John who died in 1558.

== Career ==
She first married Gruffydd ap Rhys ap Thomas. She was appointed to wait on Katherine of Aragon in October 1501. They served Katherine of Aragon and Prince Arthur at Ludlow Castle. Gruffydd and Katherine attended Henry VIII at the Field of the Cloth of Gold in 1520. Gruffydd ap Rhys died in 1521 and was buried near Prince Arthur at Worcester Cathedral. Their son, Rhys ap Gruffydd was executed for treason at the Tower of London in 1531.

Katherine married secondly Piers or Peter Edgcumbe (died August 1539) of Cotehele in Cornwall, by 1525, when in 1524–5, Sir Piers and Katherine were sent three gallons of wine “at their first homecoming.” A carved panel from a bed tester still at Cotehele, depicting the Expulsion of Adam and Eve, is sometimes said to have been hers.

She was a lady in waiting to Anne of Cleves in 1540, as a lady of the privy chamber with Lady Rutland and Lady Browne. The chronicle writer John Stow included a story about her at the court of Henry VIII. In June 1540, Elinor Rutland, Lady Jane Rochford, and "Lady Katherine Egecombe" were talking with Anne of Cleves at Westminster. They asked her if she was pregnant, and she said no. Katherine Edgcumbe asked if she was sure, since she slept with Henry every night. The three women made and signed a formal deposition or statement about this conversation, which was relevant to the issue of whether the royal marriage had been consummated.

According to Agnes Strickland, she was a Lady of the Privy-Chamber to Katherine Howard.

In July 1543 Henry VIII wanted English servants to join the household of the infant Mary, Queen of Scots, who he hoped would marry his son Prince Edward. The diplomat Ralph Sadler recommended his friend the "Lady Edongcomb", now a widow. Sadler wrote that his own wife, Ellen Mitchell, who was pregnant, was not suitable because she was unused to life at court, and an older woman and experienced courtier like Lady Edgcumbe would be better:

And, in my poor opinion, it were the more necessary, that she, whom your majesty would have to be resident about the young queen's person here, were a grave and discreet woman, of good years and experience; and the better if she were a widow, as I think the lady Edongcomb were a meet woman for such purpose, and many others, whereof I doubt not your majesty hath choice enough

Katherine Edgcumbe did not go to Scotland, as the marriage plans negotiated by Henry VIII as the Treaty of Greenwich came to nothing, and instead he launched the war now known as the Rough Wooing. In September 1543, she sent her servant to Princess Mary with a gift of a "pair of wrought sleeves". In October 1543, Henry gave her a pension or annuity.

Katherine Edgcumbe made her will at Cotehele on 4 December 1553. She left household goods, some of which had belonged to Griffith ap Rhys, to her daughter Mary Luttrell at Dunster Castle. These goods were given to her by her husband Peter Edgcumbe's will. She left the rest of her goods and her Cornish tin mines to the care of her executors. Mary Luttrell was the wife of the soldier John Luttrell.
