= Sir Rhys ap Gruffudd =

Deputy-justiciar of South Wales (c. 1283–1356)

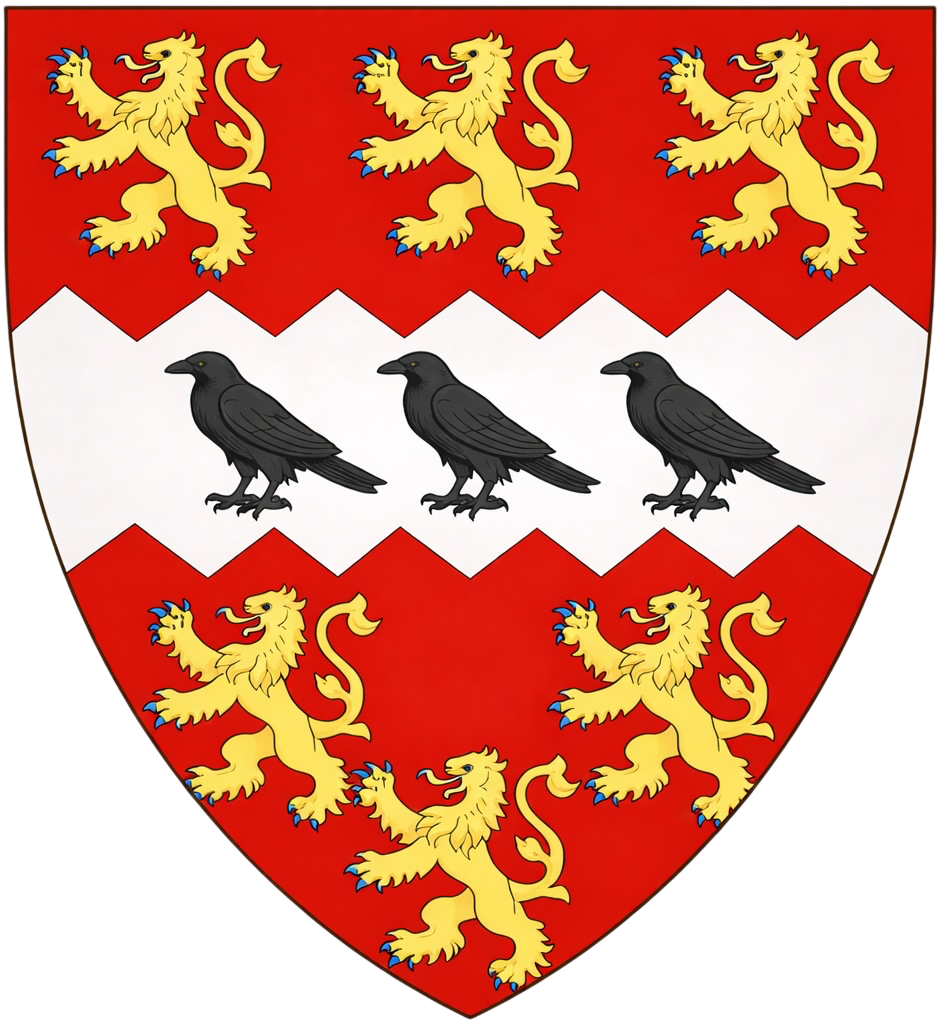
- Arms of Sir Rhys ap Gruffudd

Deputy-justiciar of South Wales
- In office 1321–1325
- Monarch: Edward II of England
- Preceded by: Robert de Malley
- Succeeded by: Robert de Malley
- In office February 1326 – February 1326
- Monarch: Edward II of England
- Preceded by: Robert de Malley
- Succeeded by: Robert de Malley
- In office 1334–1340
- Monarch: Edward III of England
- Preceded by: John Giffard
- Succeeded by: Philip de Clanvow

Personal details
- Born: c. 1283
- Died: 17 May 1356
- Spouse: Joan Somerville
- Children: Rhys ap Rhys ap Gruffudd
- Parents: Gruffudd ap Hywel (father); Nest ferch Gwrwared (mother)

Sir Rhys ap Gruffudd (c. 1283–1356), was the wealthiest nobleman in 14th-century Wales. He was the most prominent of the native supporters of the English kings during this early period of English settlement in Wales.

Rhys was the son of Gruffudd ap Hywel and his wife Nest, daughter of Gwrwared ap Gwilym of Cemais. His father was first cousin of Welsh rebel Sir Gruffydd Llwyd, while on his mother's side he was related to poet Dafydd ap Gwilym. Rhys was the great-great-grandson of thirteenth-century nobleman and dynastic founder Ednyfed Fychan, as well as of Lord Rhys of the Dinefwr dynasty. He inherited from his grandfather substantial lands around Llansadwrn, in Carmarthenshire, and held several lucrative offices in the southwest of Wales, as well as in 1308 being steward of Cardigan. In 1310 he raised and commanded troops for the English campaign against Scotland, and in 1316 against the Welsh rebel, Llywelyn Bren, and again against Scotland in 1319.

As supporter of The Elder Despenser and his son Hugh Despenser the Younger, he rose to prominence, being named sheriff of Carmarthen, deputy to the royal justice in South Wales, and receiving grants and leases to several properties as reward for his support. With their downfall, and after in August 1327 he marshalled active support from North and South Wales in a conspiracy to release the imprisoned king Edward II of England, he was forced to briefly flee to Scotland. Pardoned in February 1328, he fled again in 1330 after supporting the failed attempt of the Earl of Kent to unseat Roger Mortimer, 1st Earl of March as guardian of Edward III of England, but he was restored later in the year when the king successfully seized power. He would continue to supply and lead men for the English campaigns against Scotland through 1341, and was the predominant captain of Welsh troops, mostly archers, fighting for Edward in France, culminating in the Battle of Crecy in 1346, the same year he was knighted.

In addition to his sizable landholdings in Carmarthenshire and Ceredigion, supplemented in 1355 by additional Welsh lands inherited from his cousin, Ieuan ap Gruffudd Llwyd, his wife Joan de Somerville was coheiress to properties in six English counties. Their younger son Henry received his father's Welsh holdings, while the eldest surviving son and heir, Sir Rhys ap Gruffyud the younger, or simply Sir Rhys Griffith, born 1325, received the English inheritance of his mother, and was the first of the Griffiths of Wychnor, and ancestor through that family's heiress to the 16th-century rebel Rhys ap Gruffydd. Rhys the elder died 10 May 1356, at Carmarthen, and was buried there, having dominated south Wales for three decades.

Rhys was celebrated by Welsh poet Einion Offeiriad, and memorialized in poems by his cousin Dafydd ap Gwilym, and by Iolo Goch.

One of his descendants is the famous Rhys ap Thomas.

== Sources ==
- A. D. Carr, Medieval Wales, St. Martin's Press, 1995
- A. D. Carr, "Tudor family, forebears of". Oxford Dictionary of National Biography (online ed.). Oxford University Press. doi:10.1093/ref:odnb/77357. (Subscription, Wikipedia Library access or UK public library membership required.)
- David Green, The Hundred Years War: A People's History, Yale University Press, 2014
- R. A. Griffiths, "Rhys, Sir, ap Gruffudd". Oxford Dictionary of National Biography (online ed.). Oxford University Press. doi:10.1093/ref:odnb/48562. (Subscription, Wikipedia Library access or UK public library membership required.)
- Thomas Jones Pierce, "RHYS ap GRUFFYDD or ‘Syr RHYS’ (died 1356), nobleman", Dictionary of Welsh Biography, 1959
- Gerald Morgan, "The Growth of Gentry Estates", in Geraint H. Jenkins, ed., Cardiganshire County History, Volume 2: Medieval and Early Modern Cardiganshire, Cymdeithas Hanes Ceredigion Historical Society, 2019, pp. 391–402
- Brynley F. Roberts, "Einion Offeiriad". Oxford Dictionary of National Biography (online ed.). Oxford University Press. doi:10.1093/ref:odnb/48544. (Subscription, Wikipedia Library access or UK public library membership required.)
- Thomas Frederick Tout, "The Captivity and Death of Edward of Carnarvon", Bulletin of the John Rylands Library, vol. 6 (1923), pp. 69=115.
