= Peter Edgcumbe =

English politician (1536–1608)

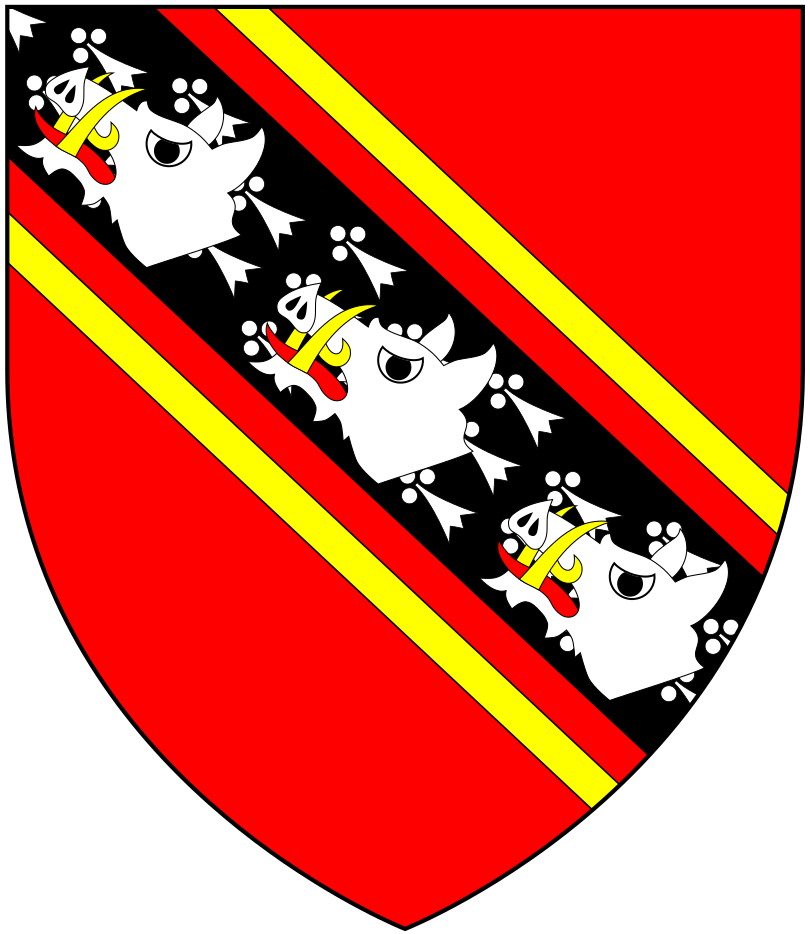
- Arms of Edgcumbe: Gules, on a bend ermines cotised or three boar's heads couped argent

Custos Rotulorum of Cornwall
- In office Before 1573-1597

Member of Parliament for Cornwall
- In office 11 January 1563 - 2 January 1567; 8 May 1572 - 1581; 1586-1593

Member of Parliament for Liskeard
- In office 1584-1585

Member of Parliament for Devon
- In office 1571

Sheriff of Cornwall
- In office 1569

Sheriff of Devon
- In office 1565

Member of Parliament for Totnes
- In office 1555

Personal details
- Born: 1536
- Died: 4 January 1608 (aged 71–72)
- Spouse: Margaret Luttrell
- Children: 9, including Richard
- Parent: Richard Edgcumbe (father)
- Relatives: Piers Edgcumbe (grandfather)

Peter (or Piers) Edgcumbe (1536 – 4 January 1608) of Mount Edgcumbe and of Cotehele in the parish of Calstock, both in Cornwall, was an English Member of Parliament.

== Origins ==
Piers was a traditional first name in his family. He was the eldest son of Sir Richard Edgcumbe (1499–1562), son of Sir Piers Edgcumbe (d.1539) of West Stonehouse and Cotehele, Cornwall.

== Career ==
He was elected a Member of Parliament for Totnes in Devon in 1555, appointed Sheriff of Devon for 1565, Sheriff of Cornwall in 1569 and Custos Rotulorum of Cornwall before 1573–1597. He was also a Member of Parliament for Cornwall in the periods 11 January 1563 – 2 January 1567 and 8 May 1572 – 1581, Devon in 1571, Liskeard in 1584–1585 and was then re-elected for Cornwall in 1586, 1589 and 1593.

He was appointed Lord Lieutenant of Cornwall for the period 8 August 1586 – 7 December 1587 and was appointed Custos Rotulorum of Cornwall in 1587.

== Marriage and issue ==
In about 1555 he married Margaret Luttrell, a daughter of Sir Andrew Luttrell, feudal baron of Dunster, of Dunster Castle in Somerset, by whom he had five sons and four daughters including:

- Richard Edgcumbe (d.1639)
- Margaret Edgcumbe, who married Sir Edward Denny of Bishops Stortford in Essex. The couple's monument with recumbent effigies survives in Waltham Abbey in Essex.

== Death and burial ==
Piers died in 1608.
