= Elizabeth Darcy =

Elizabeth Darcy may refer to:

- Elizabeth Savage, Countess Rivers (1581–1650), née Darcy
- Elizabeth Darcy, Countess of Ormond
- Elizabeth, Lady Darcy
