= Francis Arundell =

English antiquary and traveller (1780–1846)

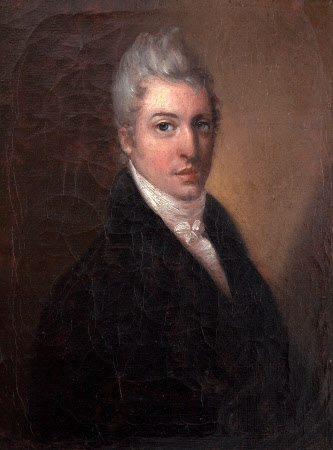
Francis Vyvyan Jago Arundell, portrait c.1815

Francis Vyvyan Jago Arundell FSA (1780–1846) was an English antiquary, Anglican clergyman and oriental traveller.

== Biography ==
Arundell was born at Launceston, Cornwall, in July 1780, being the only son of Thomas Jago, a solicitor in that town, who had married Catherine, a daughter of Mr. Bolt, a surgeon at Launceston. Francis was educated at Liskeard Grammar School and at Exeter College, Oxford, where he took the degree of M.A. in 1809, and after having been ordained in the Church of England he took a curacy at Antony in his native county.

From youth to old age Arundell was imbued with a love of antiquarian study, and after his institution in 1805 to the rectory of Landulph on the banks of the Tamar, he threw himself with avidity into the history of Cornwall. When Nicholas Condy, an artist at Plymouth, published a series of views of Cotehele, the ancient seat of Lord Mount Edgcumbe, Arundell supplied the description of the house which accompanied them. He was elected a Fellow of the Society of Antiquaries of London in 1811, but removed from the fellowship in 1845, for being 28 years behind in his subscription.

In the church of Landulph is a brass to the memory of Theodoro Palaeologus, descended from the last of the Byzantine emperors, who died on 21 January 1637, and an account of this inscription, and of the person whom it commemorated, was printed by Jago in the volume of the Archæologia for 1817, and reprinted in Davies Gilbert's Cornwall (iii, 365). This paper was afterwards amplified into Some Notice of the Church of Landulph, which was published in 1840, and a reprint of which, with additions by Joseph Polsue of Bodmin, was announced some years ago (i.e. before 1885).

=== Oriental journeys ===
One of Arundell's ancestors married a co-heiress of John Arundell of Trevarnoe, and Jago assumed that name in addition to his own on 25 February 1815. Next year (17 October) he married Anna Maria, second daughter of Isaac Morier, consul-general at Constantinople, and sister of James Morier, the author of Hajji Baba.

After this marriage, Arundell turned his thoughts towards the East and became in 1822 the chaplain to the British factory at Smyrna, where he remained for fourteen years. With characteristic energy he began, very soon after settling at Smyrna, to arrange a tour of exploration in Asia Minor. The months from March to September 1826 were spent in a pilgrimage to the seven churches of Asia and an excursion into Pisidia, a narrative of which was issued in 1828. This book was very favourably received.

Encouraged by his published success, Arundell ventured in 1833 upon another tour of 1,000 miles through districts the greater part of which had hitherto not been described by any European traveller, when he made an especial study of the ruins of Antioch in Pisidia. Two volumes describing these discoveries were published in 1834. Although he made a third tour in 1835 and 1836 through Palestine, no account of his travels was published.

Whilst residing at Smyrna, Arundell made large collections of antiquities, coins, and manuscripts; on his return to England, the coins were sold to the British Museum. He gave great assistance to the brothers Lysons in their history of Cornwall, and at one time contemplated the publication of a history of that county on his own account. It has even been said that some plates were engraved for it. The materials which he collected for histories of Smyrna and of his native town of Launceston were never used, and are probably lost. He died at Landulph on 5 December 1846 and was buried in its church, not far from the tomb of Theodore Paleologus. His widow died in Osnaburgh Street, London, on 2 June 1869, aged 80.
