= Richard Edgcumbe (died 1562) =

Member of the Parliament of England

Sir Richard Edgcumbe
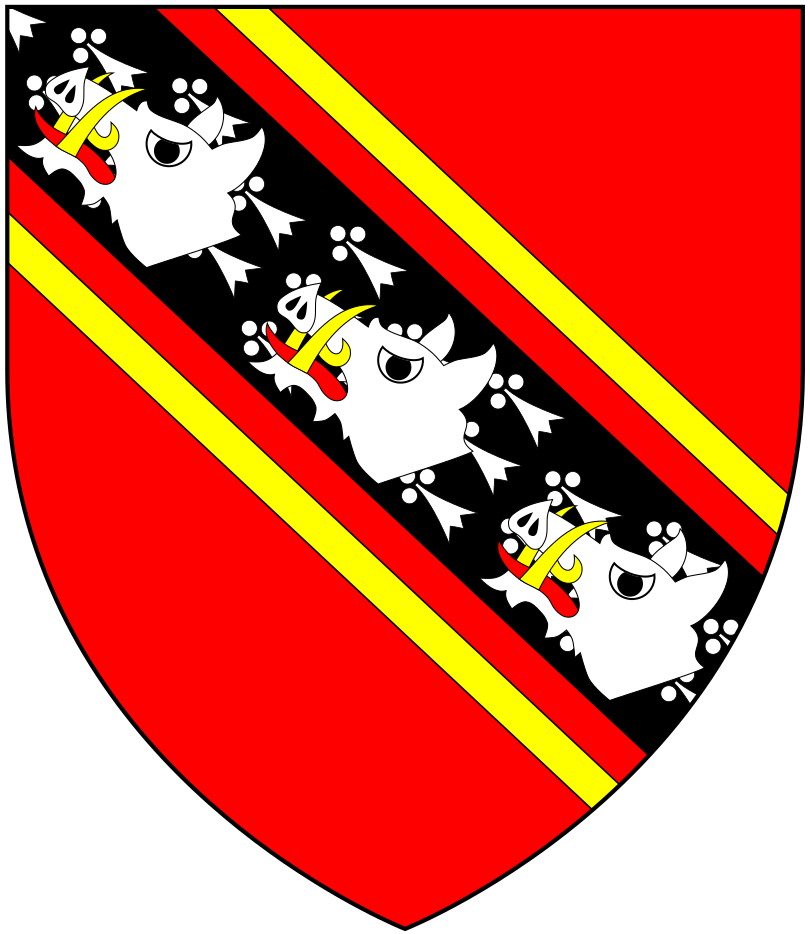
- Arms of Edgcumbe: Gules, on a bend ermines cotised or three boar's heads couped argent
- Born: c. 1499 at Cotehele, Cornwall
- Died: 1 February 1562 at Mount Edgcumbe, Cornwall
- Buried: Buried in Church of St Julian, Maker, Cornwall
- Spouses: Elizabeth Arundell; Elizabeth Tregian; Winifred Essex
- Issue: Peter Edgcumbe; Richard Edgcumbe two other sons four daughters
- Father: Sir Peter Edgcumbe
- Mother: Jane Derneford

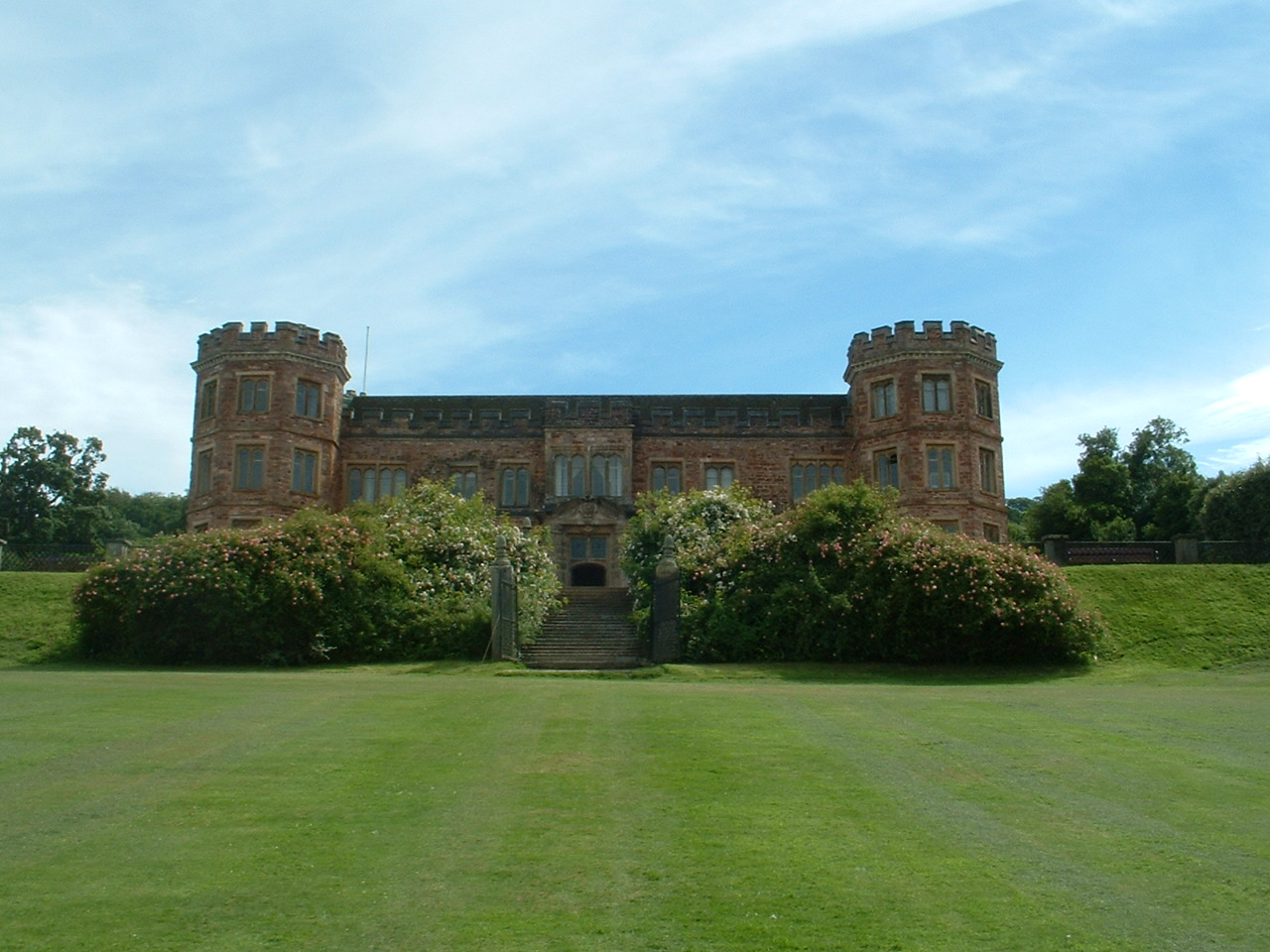
Mount Edgcumbe House, built by Sir Richard Edgcumbe

Sir Richard Edgcumbe (1499 – 1 February 1562) was an English courtier and politician.

== Family ==
Richard Edgcumbe was the eldest son of Sir Peter (or Piers) Edgcumbe (1477 – 14 August 1539) of Cotehele, Cornwall, and his first wife, Jane Derneford (d. before 1525), daughter and heir of James Derneford of Stonehouse, Devon, and widow of Charles Dynham of Nutwell, Devon.

By his father's first marriage, Richard Edgcumbe had two brothers and three sisters. His mother, Jane, died before 1525, and his father married Catherine St John, the daughter of Sir John St John of Bletsoe, and widow of Sir Gruffudd ap Rhys of Carmarthen.

== Career ==
Edgcumbe and his brother entered Lincoln's Inn on 2 February 1517. Edgcumbe's grandson, Richard Carew, says that he studied at Oxford, but of this there is no other record. He was among the knights created by Edward Seymour, 1st Earl of Hertford, 18 October 1537, and two years later he succeeded to his father's estates. On a portion of the Stonehouse property, which had come into the family through his mother, and which Sir Piers had already emparked, he built the house named by him Mount Edgcumbe, which was completed in 1553.

He was elected Member of Parliament for Cornwall in 1542 and 1547. He was High Sheriff of Devon for 1543 and 1552, High Sheriff of Cornwall for 1556 and in 1557 was named commissioner of muster in Cornwall to call out and arm three hundred men. In April 1558 he was commissioned to command the Militia of the Devonshire Hundreds around Plymouth Haven. He was complimented by Thomas Cromwell on the lucidity of the reports which he sent up from quarter sessions.

He prided himself on his housekeeping, taking care to always have in hand two years' provision of all things necessary for himself and his family, and he kept in a chest for current needs a sum of money which he never allowed to fall below £100. His hospitality earned him the name of ‘the good old knight of the castle.’ He died on 1 February 1562, as is shown by the inquisition on his will, and was buried in Maker Church under a tombstone, the inscription on which states that he died 1 December 1561.

== Marriages and issue ==
Edgcumbe married firstly, about 1516, Elizabeth Arundell, the daughter of Sir John Arundell (c. 1474 – 8 February 1545) of Lanherne, Cornwall, by his first wife, Lady Eleanor Grey, the daughter of Thomas Grey, 1st Marquess of Dorset, and his second wife, Cecily Bonville, 7th Baroness Harington. There were no issue of the marriage. He married secondly, in 1535, Elizabeth Tregian, the daughter of John Tregian of Golden, Cornwall, by whom he had four sons, including Peter Edgcumbe and Richard Edgcumbe, and four daughters. He married thirdly, Winifred Essex, the daughter of Sir William Essex of Lambourn, Berkshire. There were no issue of his third marriage.

Piers (or Peter Edgcumbe), the eldest son (1536–1607), was sheriff of Devon in 1566 and Cornwall in 1569, and represented Cornwall county in the parliaments of 1562–3, 1572, 1588, and 1592, and Liskeard borough in those of 1584 and 1586. Richard, the second son, was M.P. for Totnes 1562–3.
