= Dafydd ap Phylip ap Rhys =

Dafydd ap Phylip ap Rhys was a 16th-century Welsh poet (probably from Llangyfelach, near Swansea). He may have been a member of a holy order. A cywydd in praise of Sir Rhys ap Thomas (q.v.) is thought to be his only surviving work. He is mentioned in the Iolo Morganwg manuscripts, held by the National Library of Wales.
