= Arthur, Prince of Wales =

Heir apparent of Henry VII of England (1486–1502)

Arthur
- Prince of Wales; Earl of Chester
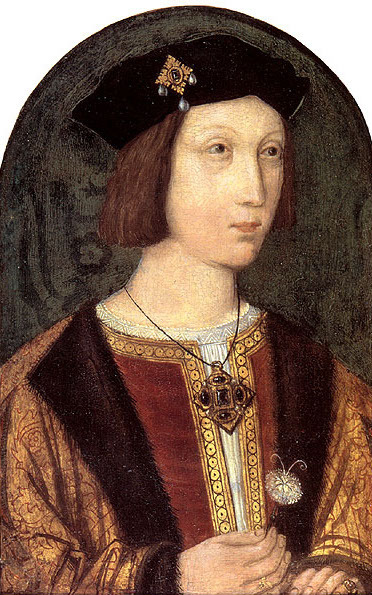
- Portrait, c. 1500
- Born: 19/20 September 1486; Winchester Cathedral Priory, Winchester, England
- Died: 2 April 1502 (aged 15); Ludlow Castle, Ludlow, Shropshire, England
- Burial: 25 April 1502; Worcester Cathedral, Worcester, England
- Spouse: Catherine of Aragon (m. 1501)
- House: Tudor
- Father: Henry VII of England
- Mother: Elizabeth of York

Arthur, Prince of Wales (19/20 September 1486 – 2 April 1502), was the eldest son of Henry VII of England and Elizabeth of York, and an older brother to the future Henry VIII. He was Duke of Cornwall from birth, and he was created Prince of Wales and Earl of Chester in 1489. As the heir apparent of his father, Arthur was viewed by contemporaries as the great hope of the newly established House of Tudor. His mother was the daughter of the Yorkist king, Edward IV, and his birth cemented the union between the House of Lancaster and the House of York.

Plans for Arthur's marriage began before his third birthday. At the age of eleven, he was formally betrothed to Catherine of Aragon, a daughter of the powerful Catholic Monarchs in Spain, in an effort to forge an Anglo-Spanish alliance against France and Scotland. Arthur was well educated and was in good health for the majority of his life. Soon after his marriage to Catherine in 1501, the couple took up residence at Ludlow Castle in Shropshire, where Arthur died six months later, possibly from the sweating sickness, which Catherine survived. Catherine later firmly stated that the marriage had not been consummated.

One year after Arthur's death, Henry VII renewed his efforts to seal a marital alliance with Spain by arranging for Catherine to marry Arthur's younger brother Henry, who would ascend to the throne in 1509 as King Henry VIII. The question over whether Arthur and Catherine had consummated their marriage was much later, and in a completely different political context, exploited by Henry VIII and his court. They pointed out that it says in the Bible, "If a man shall take his brother's wife, it is an unclean thing; they shall be childless." If Catherine's marriage to Arthur had actually been consummated, her marriage to Henry would have been a sin according to their interpretation, which would justify an annulment. This strategy was employed in order to cast doubt upon the validity of Catherine's union with Henry VIII, eventually leading to the separation between the Church of England and the Roman Catholic Church.

== Infancy ==
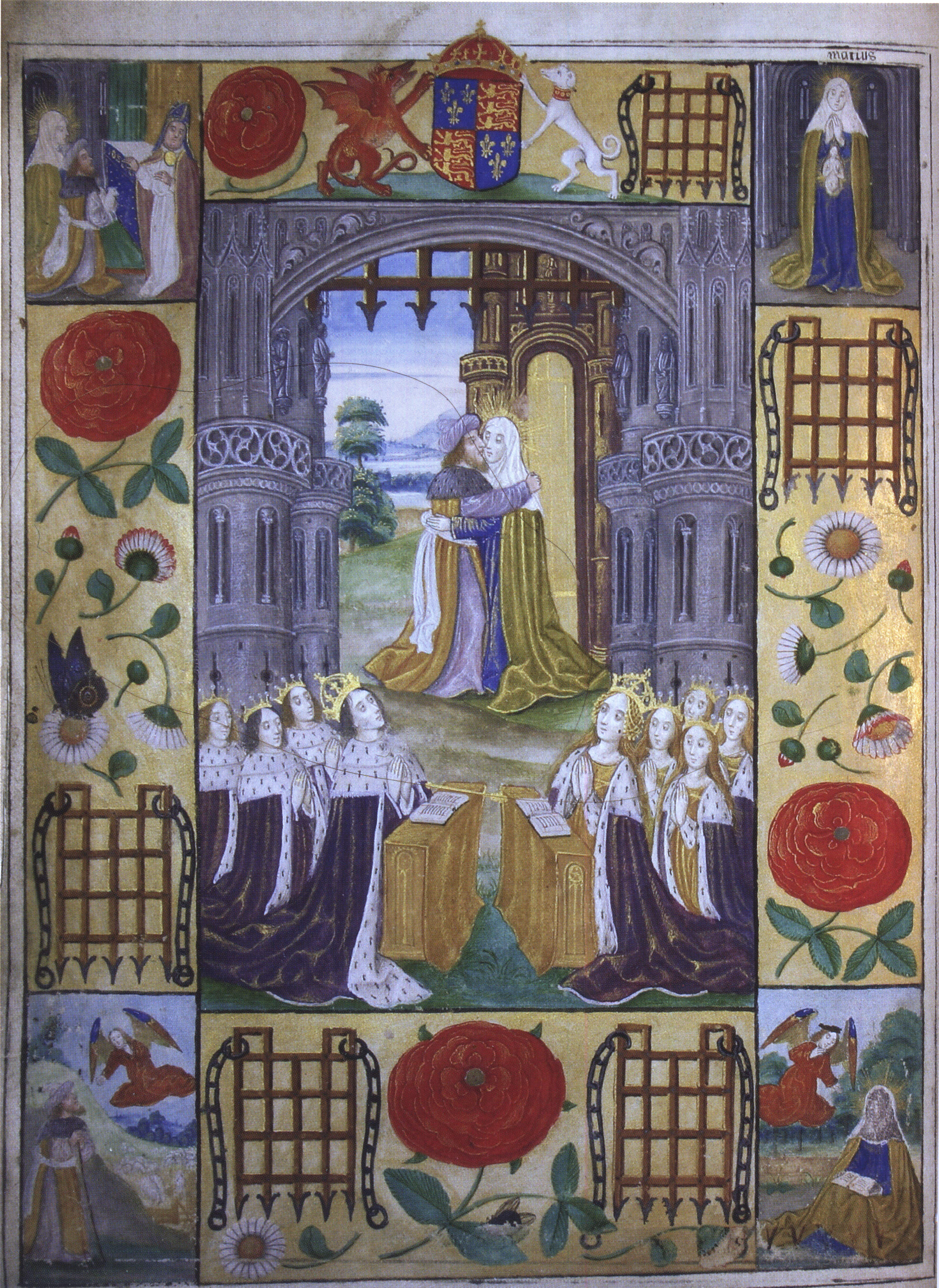
The family of Henry VII, depicted on an illuminated page.

Henry VII became King of England upon defeating Richard III at the Battle of Bosworth Field in 1485. In an effort to strengthen the Tudor claim to the throne, Henry decided on naming his firstborn son "Arthur" and having him born in Winchester – where the Legend of King Arthur originated – in order to emphasise the Welsh origin of the Tudors. On this occasion, Camelot was identified as present-day Winchester, and his wife, Elizabeth of York, was sent to Saint Swithun's Priory (today Winchester Cathedral Priory) to give birth. Born at Saint Swithun's on the night of 19/20 September 1486 at about 1 am, Arthur was Henry and Elizabeth's eldest child.

Arthur's birth was anticipated by French and Italian humanists eager for the start of a "Virgilian golden age". Sir Francis Bacon wrote that although the Prince was born one month premature, he was "strong and able". Young Arthur was viewed as "a living symbol" of not only the union between the House of Lancaster and the House of York, to which his mother belonged as the daughter of Edward IV, but also of the end of the Wars of the Roses. In the opinion of contemporaries, Arthur was the great hope of the newly established House of Tudor.

Arthur became Duke of Cornwall at birth. Four days after his birth, he was baptised at Winchester Cathedral by the Bishop of Worcester, John Alcock, which was immediately followed by his confirmation. His godparents were John de Vere, 13th Earl of Oxford; Thomas Stanley, 1st Earl of Derby; William FitzAlan, 16th Earl of Arundel; Arthur's grandmother, Queen Elizabeth Woodville; and his aunt Cecily of York. Elizabeth and Cecily carried the prince during the ceremony. Initially, Arthur's nursery in Farnham was headed by Elizabeth Darcy, who had served as chief nurse for Edward IV's children, including Arthur's own mother. After Arthur was created Prince of Wales in 1489, he was awarded a household structure at the behest of his father. Over the next thirteen years, his parents would have six more children, of whom only three – Margaret, Henry and Mary – would reach adulthood. Arthur was especially close to his sister Margaret (b. 1489) and his brother Henry (b. 1491), with whom he shared a nursery.

On 29 November 1489, after being made a Knight of the Bath, Arthur was appointed Prince of Wales and Earl of Chester, and was invested as such at the Palace of Westminster on 27 February 1490. As part of his investiture ceremony, he progressed down the River Thames in the royal barge and was met at Chelsea by the Lord Mayor of London, John Mathewe, and at Lambeth by Spanish ambassadors. On 8 May 1491, he was made a Knight of the Garter at Saint George's Chapel at Windsor Palace.

Around 1491, Arthur began his formal education under John Rede, a former headmaster of Winchester College. His education was subsequently taken over by Bernard André, a blind French poet and Augustinian friar, and then by Thomas Linacre, formerly Henry VII's physician. Arthur's education covered grammar, poetry, rhetoric and ethics and focused on history.

Arthur was a very skilled pupil and André wrote that the Prince of Wales had either memorised or read a selection of Homer, Virgil, Ovid, Terence, a good deal of Cicero and a wide span of historical works, including those of Thucydides, Caesar, Livy and Tacitus. Arthur was also a "superb archer", and had learned to dance "right pleasant and honourably" by 1501.

== Childhood ==
The popular belief that Arthur was sickly during his lifetime stems from a misunderstanding of a 1502 letter, but there are no reports of Arthur being ill during his lifetime. He grew up to be unusually tall for his age, and was considered handsome by the Spanish court: he had reddish hair, small eyes, and a high-bridged nose, resembling his brother Henry, who was said to be "extremely handsome" by contemporaries. As described by historians Steven Gunn and Linda Monckton, Arthur had an "amiable and gentle" personality and was, overall, a "delicate lad".

In May 1490, Arthur was created warden of all the marches towards Scotland and the Earl of Surrey was appointed as the Prince's deputy. From 1491, Arthur was named on peace commissions. In October 1492, when his father travelled to France, he was named Keeper of England and King's Lieutenant. Following the example of Edward IV, Henry VII set up the Council of Wales and the Marches for Arthur in Wales, in order to enforce royal authority there. Although the council had already been set up in 1490, it was headed by Jasper Tudor, Duke of Bedford. By 1493, Arthur had been sent with his household to Ludlow Castle, near Wales. In March 1493, Arthur was granted the power to appoint justices of oyer and terminer and inquire into franchises, thus strengthening the council's authority. In November of that year, the Prince also received an extensive land grant in Wales, including the County of March.

Arthur was served by sons of English, Irish and Welsh nobility, such as Gerald FitzGerald, 9th Earl of Kildare, who had been brought to the English court as a consequence of the involvement of his father, Gerald FitzGerald, 8th Earl of Kildare, in the crowning of pretender Lambert Simnel in Ireland during Henry VII's reign. Other servants were Anthony Willoughby, a son of Robert Willoughby, 1st Baron Willoughby de Broke, Robert Radcliffe, the heir of the 9th Baron FitzWalter and Maurice St John, a favourite nephew of Arthur's grandmother Lady Margaret Beaufort. He was brought up with Gruffydd ap Rhys ap Thomas, the son of powerful Welsh nobleman Rhys ap Thomas. Gruffydd grew quite close to Arthur and was buried in Worcester Cathedral upon his death in 1521, alongside the Prince's tomb.

== Marriage ==
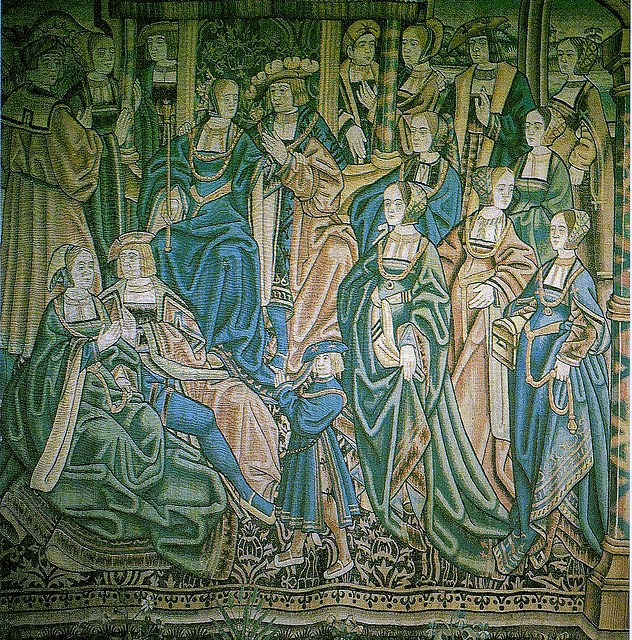
A Flemish tapestry depicting Arthur and Catherine's court.

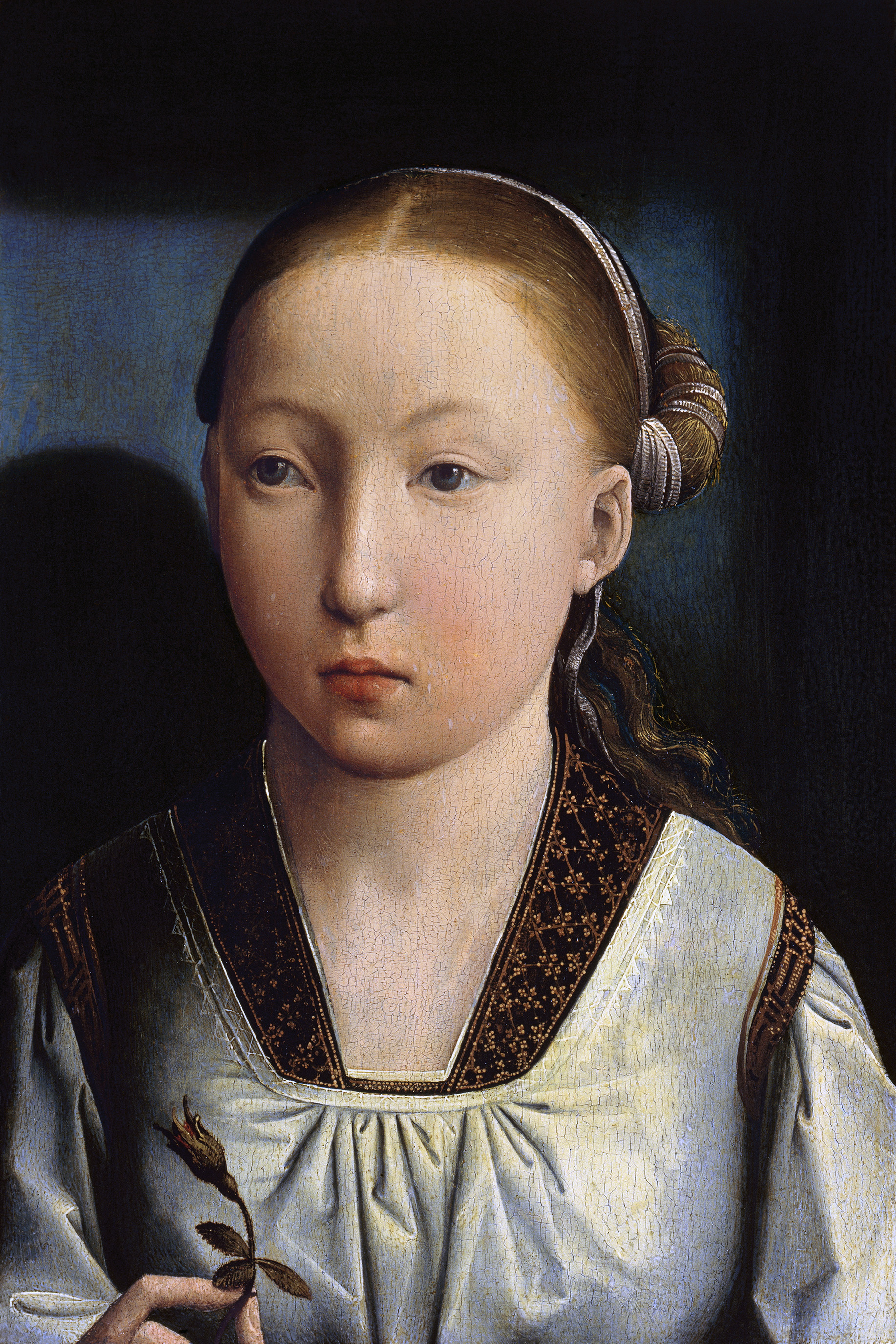
1496 Portrait by Juan de Flandes thought to be of 11-year-old Catherine. She resembles her sister Joanna of Castile.

Henry VII planned to marry Arthur to a daughter of the Catholic Monarchs, Isabella I of Castile and Ferdinand II of Aragon, in order to forge an Anglo-Spanish alliance against France. It was suggested that the choice of marrying Arthur to Ferdinand and Isabella's youngest daughter, Catherine (b. 1485), would be appropriate. Thanks to negotiations by the Spanish ambassador Rodrigo González de la Puebla, the Treaty of Medina del Campo (27 March 1489) provided that Arthur and Catherine would be married as soon as they reached canonical age; it also settled Catherine's dowry at 200,000 crowns (the equivalent of £5 million in 2007). Since Arthur, not yet 14, was below the age of consent, a papal dispensation (i.e., waiver) allowing the marriage was issued in February 1497, and the pair were betrothed by proxy on 25 August 1497.

To demonstrate his status as heir to the throne, Arthur made a Royal Entry to Coventry in October 1498. He was welcomed with pageants of the Nine Worthies, introduced by King Arthur, by Queen Fortune, and by Saint George defending a maiden from the dragon. In 1499, a marriage by proxy took place at Arthur's Tickenhill Manor in Bewdley, near Worcester; Arthur said to Roderigo de Puebla, who acted as proxy for Catherine, that "he much rejoiced to contract the marriage because of his deep and sincere love for the Princess". In October 1499, Arthur, referring to Catherine as "my dearest spouse", wrote:

"I cannot tell you what an earnest desire I feel to see your Highness, and how vexatious to me is this procrastination about your coming. Let be hastened, the love conceived between us and the wished-for joys may reap their proper fruit."

The young couple exchanged letters in Latin until 20 September 1501, when Arthur, having attained the age of 15, was deemed old enough to be married. Catherine landed in England about two weeks later, on 2 October 1501, at Plymouth. The next month, on 4 November 1501, the couple met for the first time at Dogmersfield in Hampshire. Arthur wrote to Catherine's parents that he would be "a true and loving husband"; the couple soon discovered that they had mastered different pronunciations of Latin and so were unable to easily communicate. Five days later, on 9 November 1501, Catherine arrived in London.

On 14 November 1501, the marriage ceremony finally took place at Saint Paul's Cathedral; both Arthur and Catherine wore white satin. The ceremony was conducted by Henry Deane, Archbishop of Canterbury, who was assisted by William Warham, Bishop of London. Following the ceremony, Arthur and Catherine left the Cathedral and headed for Baynard's Castle, where they were entertained by "the best voiced children of the King's chapel, who sang right sweetly with quaint harmony".

What followed was a bedding ceremony laid down by Arthur's grandmother Lady Margaret Beaufort: the bed was sprinkled with holy water, after which Catherine was led away from the wedding feast by her ladies-in-waiting. She was undressed, veiled and "reverently" laid in bed, while Arthur, "in his shirt, with a gown cast about him," was escorted by his gentlemen into the bedchamber as viols and tabors played. The Bishop of London blessed the bed, and prayed for the marriage to be fruitful, after which the couple were left alone. This is the only public bedding of a royal couple recorded in Britain in the 16th century.

== Death ==
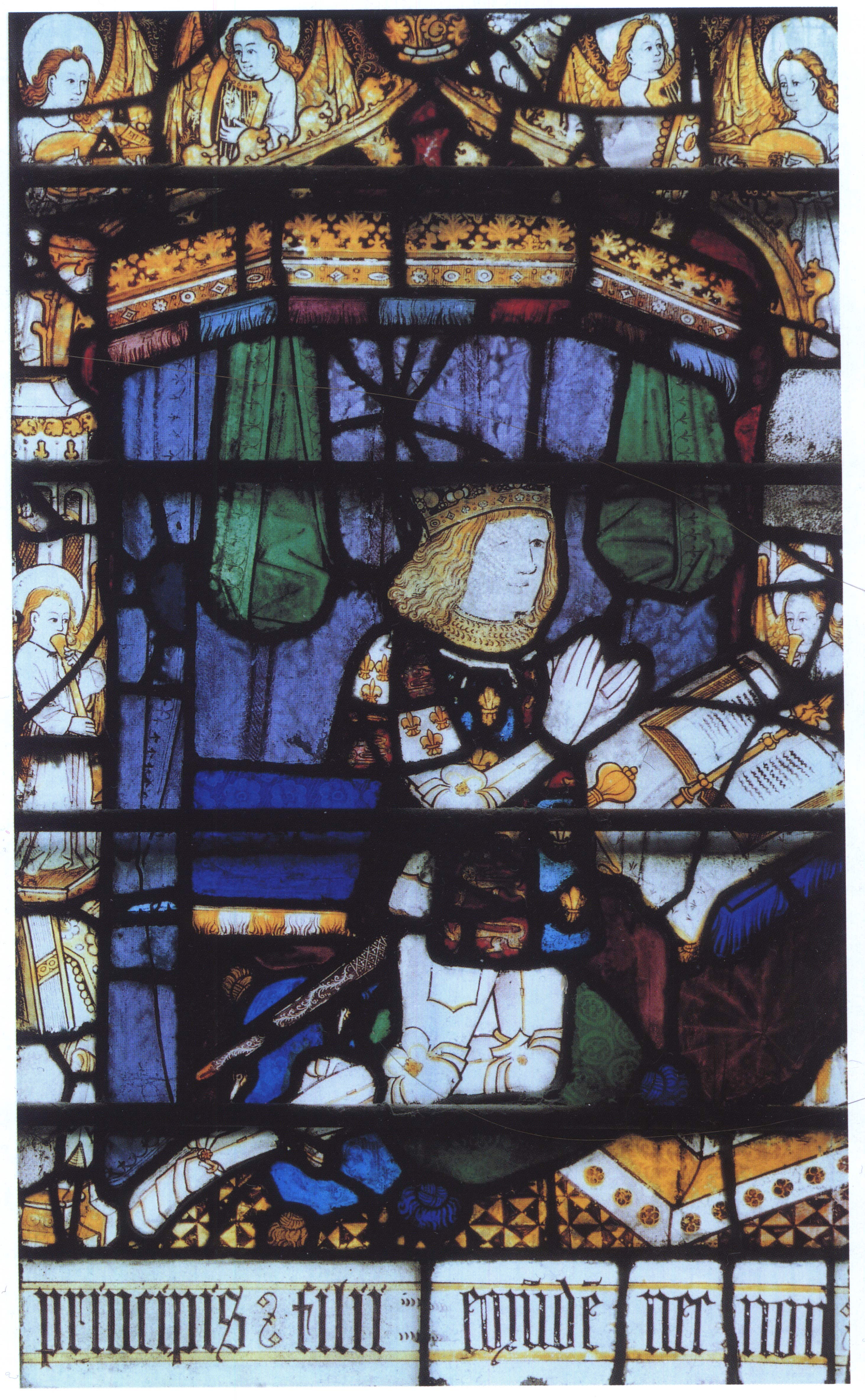
Prince Arthur at prayer, depicted on a stained glass window in Great Malvern Priory

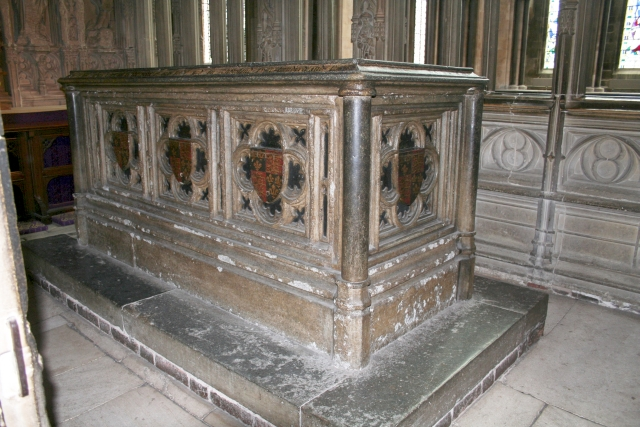
Prince Arthur's Tomb in Worcester Cathedral

After residing at Tickenhill Manor for a month, Arthur and Catherine headed for the Welsh Marches, where they established their household at Ludlow Castle. Arthur had been growing weaker since his wedding, and Henry VII thus seemed reluctant to allow Catherine to follow him, until ultimately ordering her to join her husband.

Arthur found it easy to govern Wales, as the border had become quiet after many centuries of warfare. In March 1502, Arthur and Catherine were afflicted by an unknown illness, "a malign vapour which proceeded from the air." It has been suggested that this illness was the mysterious English sweating sickness, tuberculosis ("consumption"), plague or influenza. (Note: In 2002, Arthur's tomb was opened, but experts could not determine the exact cause of death; a genetic ailment which also affected Arthur's nephew, Edward VI, was mentioned as a possible cause being investigated.) While Catherine recovered, Arthur died on 2 April 1502 at Ludlow, six months short of his sixteenth birthday.

News of Arthur's death reached Henry VII's court late on 4 April. The King was awoken from his sleep by his confessor, who quoted Job by asking Henry "If we receive good things at the hands of God, why may we not endure evil things?" He then told the king that "[his] dearest son hath departed to God," and Henry burst into tears. "Grief-stricken and emotional," he then had his wife, Elizabeth, brought into his chambers, so that they might "take the painful news together"; Elizabeth reminded Henry that God had helped him become king and "had ever preserved him," adding that they had been left with "yet a fair Prince and two fair princesses and that God is where he was, and [they were] both young enough." Soon after leaving Henry's bedchamber, Elizabeth collapsed and began to cry, while the ladies sent for the King, who hurriedly came and "relieved her."

On 8 April, a general procession took place for the salvation of Arthur's soul. That night, a dirge was sung in St Paul's Cathedral and every parish church in London. On 23 April, Arthur's body, which had previously been embalmed, sprinkled with holy water and sheltered with a canopy, was carried out of Ludlow Castle and into the Parish Church of Ludlow by various noblemen and gentlemen. On 25 April, Arthur's body was taken to Worcester Cathedral via the River Severn, in a "special wagon upholstered in black and drawn by six horses, also caparisoned in black." As was customary, Catherine did not attend the funeral. Thomas Howard, 1st Earl of Surrey acted as chief mourner. At the end of the ceremony, Sir William Uvedale, Sir Richard Croft and Arthur's household ushers broke their staves of office and threw them into the Prince's grave. During the funeral, Arthur's own arms were shown alongside those of Cadwaladr ap Gruffydd and Brutus of Troy. Two years later, a chantry was erected over Arthur's grave.

== Legacy ==
Shortly after Arthur's death, the idea of betrothing the widowed Catherine to the new heir apparent, Henry, had arisen; Henry VII and Isabella I were keen on moving forward with the betrothal and the pope granted a dispensation towards that end. Henry VIII ascended the throne on 22 April 1509 and married Arthur's widow on 11 June. They had six children; their three sons died before reaching three months of age, one daughter was stillborn, and another lived for only a week. The couple's surviving child was Mary I (b. 1516). In 1526, Henry started to pursue the affections of Anne Boleyn. At the same time, he became troubled by what became known as the King's "great matter", that is, finding an appropriate solution for his lack of male descendants. It soon became the King's wish to dissolve his marriage and marry Anne, who was more likely to bear children.

Henry believed that his marriage was cursed, and believed he found confirmation in the Bible, in Leviticus 20:21. (Note: Although Henry would have read the verse in Latin, the translation provided by the 1604 King James Version states that "and if a man shall take his brother's wife, it is an unclean thing: he hath uncovered his brother's nakedness; they shall be childless.") Although in the morning following his wedding, Arthur had claimed that he was thirsty "for I have been in the midst of Spain last night" and that "having a wife is a good pastime", these claims are generally dismissed by modern historians as mere boasts of a boy who did not want others to know of his failure to perform. Until the day she died, Catherine maintained that she had married Henry while still a virgin. After Henry's constant support of the claim that Catherine's first marriage had been consummated, an annulment was issued on 23 May 1533, while the King had already married Anne on 25 January. Anne was beheaded for high treason in 1536, after which Henry proceeded to marry four more times. At the time of his death in 1547, Henry only had three living children; the only son, Edward VI, succeeded but died six years later. His successors were Henry's daughters by Catherine and Anne, Mary I and Elizabeth I. Upon Elizabeth's death in 1603, the House of Tudor came to an end.

In 2002, following the initiative of Canon Ian MacKenzie, Arthur's funeral was reenacted with a requiem mass at Worcester Cathedral, on occasion of the quincentenary of his death. Despite his role in English history, Arthur has remained largely forgotten since his death.

Henry VIII owned a portrait of Arthur wearing a "red cap with a brooch upon it, and a collar of red and white roses". A portrait of Arthur was rediscovered by English art dealer Philip Mould.

The stained-glass image of Arthur Tudor praying is in the west window of the nave in St Laurence's Church in Ludlow, Shropshire where he died at the castle in 1502. Arthur's bowels (called euphemistically "the heart") had been buried in a lead box in the church's choir but were noted in 1723 as having been taken up not long since.

== In popular culture ==
Arthur has been featured in several historical fiction novels, such as The King's Pleasure, by Norah Lofts, Three Sisters, Three Queens by Philippa Gregory and Katherine, The Virgin Widow, by Jean Plaidy. In The Constant Princess, by Philippa Gregory, Catherine promises Arthur to marry his brother, thus fulfilling not only her own destiny of becoming Queen of England but also the couple's plans for the future of the kingdom. The Alteration, by Kingsley Amis, is an alternate history novel whose first point of divergence is Arthur's survival and reign as king, being succeeded by his son Stephen II.

The historical drama The Six Wives of Henry VIII was broadcast in 1970, with Martin Ratcliffe as "Prince Arthur". In 1972, BBC2 aired a historical miniseries titled The Shadow of the Tower, with "Lord Arthur, Prince of Wales" played by Jason Kemp. He is portrayed by Angus Imrie in 2019 period drama The Spanish Princess.

Arthur, Prince of Wales House of Tudor Born: 19 September 1486 Died: 2 April 1502
Peerage of England
Preceded by Edward of Middleham	Prince of Wales; 1486–1502	Succeeded by Henry Tudor
