= Peter Edgecumbe (died 1539) =

British courtier and politician

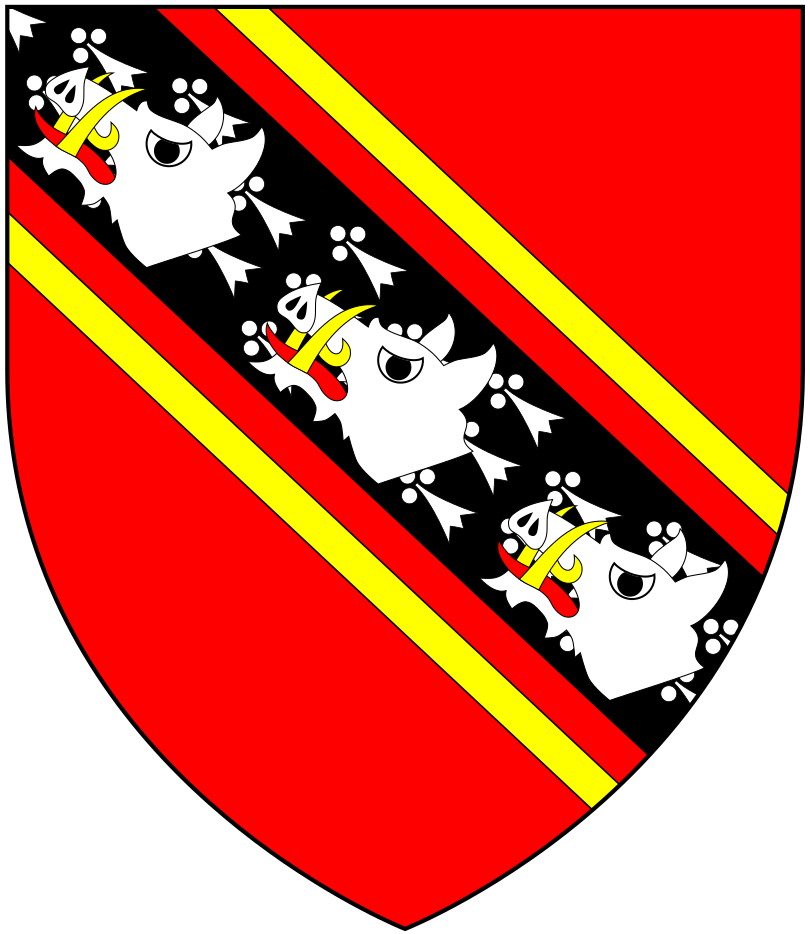
- Arms of Edgcumbe: Gules, on a bend ermines cotised or three boar's heads couped argent

High Sheriff of Cornwall
- In office 1498–1499; 1505–1506; 1516–1517; 1534–1535

High Sheriff of Devon
- In office 1494–1495; 1497–1498; 1518–1519; 1529–1530

Member of Parliament of England
- In office 1515; 1529

Personal details
- Born: 1468/1469
- Died: 1539 (aged 69–71)
- Spouse(s): Jane Dernford; Katherine St. John
- Children: 3, including Richard
- Parent: Richard Edgecumbe (father)

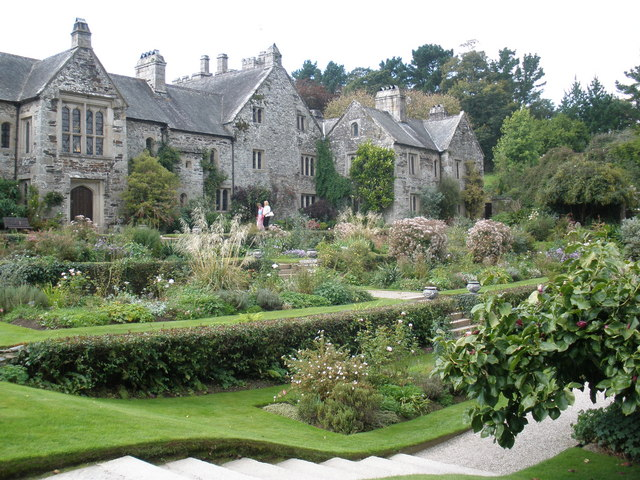
Cotehele

Sir Peter (or Piers) Edgecumbe (1468/69 – 1539) of Cotehele, Cornwall was an English courtier, sheriff and Member of Parliament.

== Biography ==
He was born the son of Richard Edgecumbe of Meavy, Devon and Cotehele and admitted to Lincoln's Inn in 1488. He succeeded his father in 1489.

He was an esquire of the body by 1489 and created a Knight of the Bath by 1504. He succeeded his father as constable of Launceston Castle from 1489 to his own death. He was pricked High Sheriff of Devon for 1494–95, 1497–98, 1518–19 and 1529–30 and High Sheriff of Cornwall for 1498–99, 1505–06, 1516–17 and 1534–35. He was knight of the shire for Cornwall in the Parliament of England in 1515 and 1529.

In 1497, he enlisted the men of Devon and Cornwall to suppress Perkin Warbeck's rebellion and was involved in the relief of Exeter. In 1513 he accompanied Henry VIII to France where, in recognition of his bravery, he was made knight banneret. In 1520 he was present with Henry VIII at the Field of the Cloth of Gold.

He died in 1539, having married twice. His first marriage was with Jane, the daughter and heiress of James Dernford of West Stonehouse and widow of Charles Dynham of Nutwell, Devon, with whom he had 3 sons, including his heir Richard Edgecumbe and 4 daughters.

He married secondly by 1525, Katherine, the daughter of Sir John St. John of Bletsoe, Bedfordshire and the widow of Sir Griffith ap Rhys of Carmarthen, when in 1524–25, Sir Piers and Katherine were sent three gallons of wine “at their first homecoming.” She was a lady-in-waiting to Anne of Cleves in 1540, and a Lady of the Privy-Chamber to Queen Katherine Howard. The diplomat Ralph Sadler admired Katherine's gravity, and in July 1543 advised Henry VIII to send her to Scotland to join the household of Mary, Queen of Scots at Stirling Castle, under a provision of the Treaty of Greenwich. This plan was cancelled by the War of the Rough Wooing.
