= Prospect Tower =

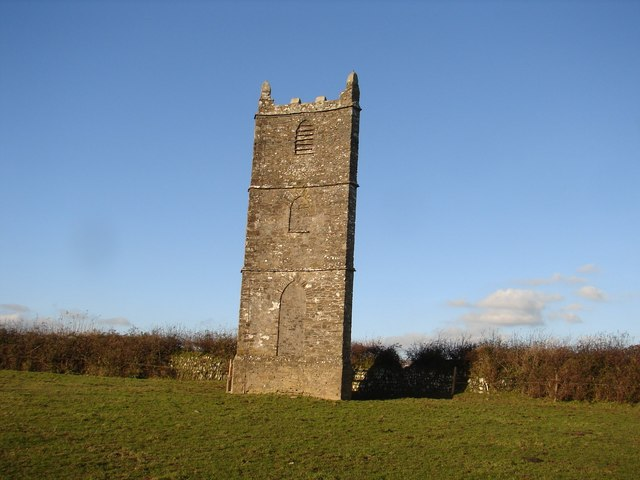

- Location within Cornwall
- 50°29′56″N 4°13′31″W
- Type: Folly
- Location: Calstock

History
- Built: 1789

Site notes
- Owner: National Trust

Listed Building – Grade II*
- Official name: The Prospect Tower
- Designated: 19 October 1987
- Reference no.: 1311985

Prospect Tower is a folly on the Cotehele Estate. It has three sides and is 60 ft high. When the National Trust was given the Cotehele Estate in 1947 the Trust renovated the tower and constructed a wooden spiral staircase inside, to allow visitors. The Tower was last renovated in 2018 and is still open to the public.

== History ==
Prospect Tower was built by the 2nd Earl of Mount Edgcumbe in celebration of the royal visit of King George III.
