= Nicholas Condy =

English painter

Nicholas Condy (1793 – 8 January 1857) was an English painter.

Condy was baptised on 2 April 1793 in Withiel, Cornwall. His father Nicholas Condy, of Mevagissey, had married Elizabeth Thomas in Withiel on 28 June 1790. A Nicholas Condy died in 1807 in Torpoint, presumably his father. Although Condy is also recorded as being born at Torpoint, in the then parish of Antony East, Cornwall, in 1793, no entry of his baptism is to be found in the register kept at Antony Church.

Condy married Ann Trevanion Pyle (1792–1860) on 3 October 1814 in Stoke Damerel, now Plymouth. Ann was from Falmouth and daughter of Captain Mark Oates of the Marines. The couple had a son, maritime painter Nicholas Matthews Condy, who is often confused with him, who died before him.

He was gazetted to the 43rd Regiment as an ensign on 9 May 1811 fighting against Napoleon's army in the Peninsula War, in Spain and Portugal. He became a Lieutenant on 24 February 1818, and was thenceforth on half-pay during the remainder of his life.

From 1818 he devoted his attention to art, and became a professional painter at Plymouth. He chiefly produced small oil paintings and water-colours on tinted paper, about eight inches by five inches, which he sold at prices ranging from fifteen shillings to one guinea each.

Condy made many paintings of Cotehele and Mount Edgcumbe and the 2nd and 3rd Earls of Mount Edgcumbe were patrons of his.

Condy exhibited two landscapes at the Royal Academy. In 1843 'An interior of an Irish cottage at Ballyboyleboo, Antrim' and in 1845 'The Cloisters of Lacock Abbey'. Between 1830 and 1845 he also exhibited two paintings at the British Institution, and at Suffolk Street Gallery.

His best known painting is entitled The Old Hall at Cotehele on a Rent-day. He brought out a work called Cotehele, on the Banks of the Tamar, the ancient seat of the Right Hon. the Earl of Mount-Edgcumbe, by N. Condy, with a descriptive account written by the Rev. F. V. J. Arundell, 17 plates, London, published by the author, at 17 Gate Street, Lincoln's Inn Fields, with text supplied by Francis Vyvyan Jago Arundell.

He died at 10 Mount Pleasant Terrace, Plymouth, aged 64, and was buried in St. Andrew's churchyard.

== Paintings (selected ==
- In the Scullery
