= Gruffydd ap Rhys ap Thomas =

Welsh nobleman

The coat of arms of Rhys's family

Sir Gruffydd ap Rhys KG (c. 1478–1521) (also known as Griffith Ryce in some antiquarian English sources) was a Welsh nobleman. He was the son of Sir Rhys ap Thomas, the de facto ruler of most of south-west Wales who aided Henry Tudor in his victory on Bosworth Field in 1485 and Efa ferch Henry.

== Early life ==
In the reign of Richard III his father's loyalty was questioned to the house of York as support grew for Henry of Richmond (later Henry VII of England). Around the time of Richard's usurpation and Buckingham's rebellion in 1483, as a way of keeping Rhys ap Thomas's loyalty, Richard demanded an oath of allegiance from Gruffydd's father as well as demanding that his young son Gruffydd be in his own custody. Rhys assured Richard of his loyalty but refused to hand over young Gruffydd, who was only four or five at the time.

When Gruffydd was older he became a member of Prince Arthur's household. Henry VII of England aimed to have his son friends with influential young men with powerful fathers in Henry's kingdom, and Gruffydd's father was one of the most powerful men in Wales after the death of Jasper Tudor in 1495, and he was chosen to serve the young Prince. Gruffydd and Prince Arthur seem to have been quite close; in 1501 Gruffydd was made a Knight of the Garter, and was with Arthur and his bride Katherine of Aragon when they returned to Ludlow in December 1501; and was there for Arthur's death in April 1502.

== Death of the Prince ==
On the death of Prince Arthur in 1502, Gruffydd ap Rhys was a prominent mourner. He accompanied the Prince's body from Ludlow to its final resting place in Worcester. The following contemporary record gives an account of Gruffydd as he travelled with the "rich chariot" which carried Prince Arthur's body: "in mourning habit, rode next before the leading horse on a courser trapped with black, bearing the Prince's banner." During the funeral service for the Prince in Worcester Cathedral, he once again carried Arthur's "rich embroidered banner."

== Later life ==
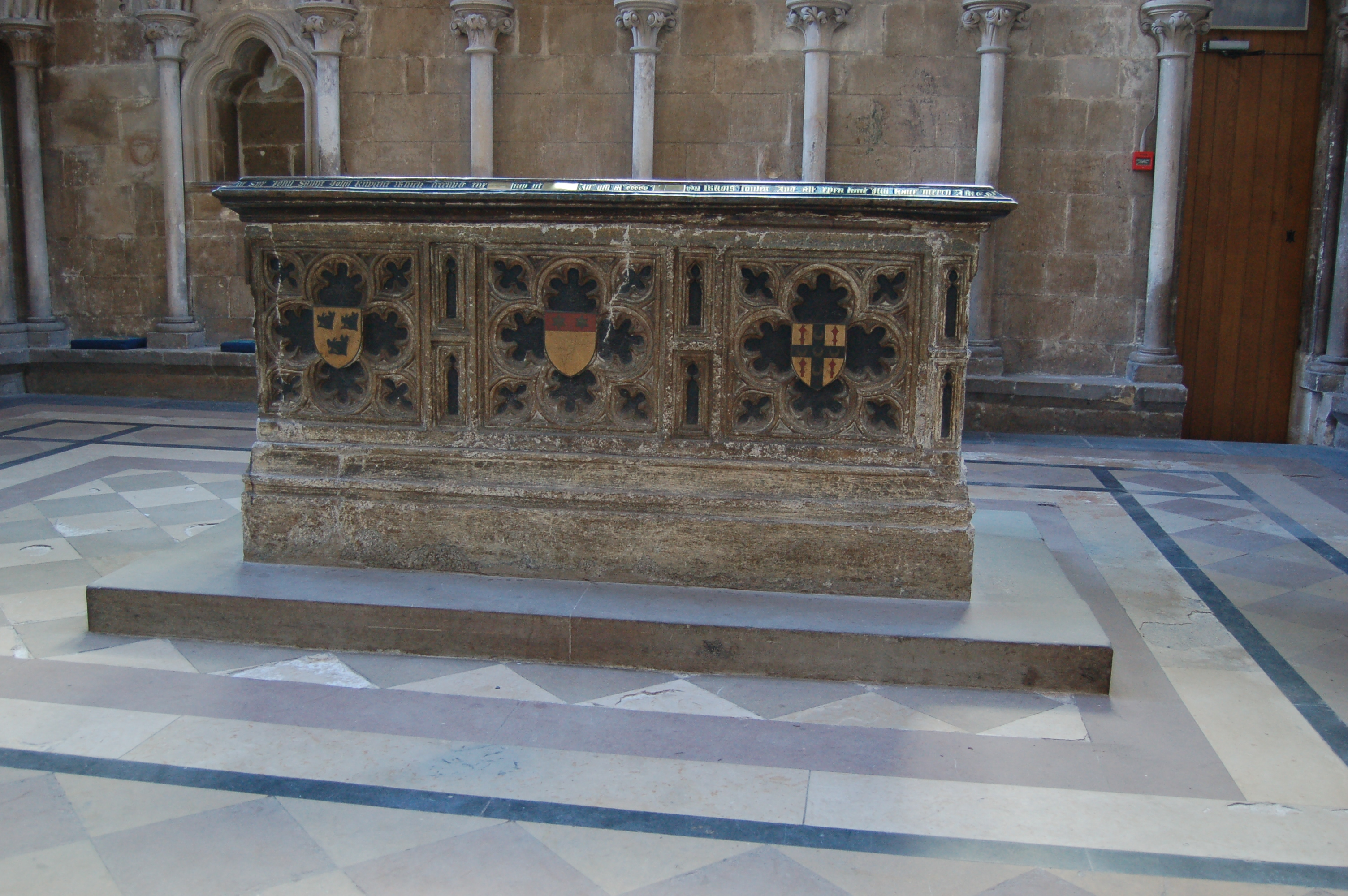
Sir Gruffydd ap Rhys's tomb.

Around 1500 Gruffydd married Katherine St. John, daughter of John St. John, who was related to Margaret Beaufort through her mother, Duchess Margaret Beauchamp of Bletso. She was appointed to wait on Katherine of Aragon in October 1501. They had one son: Rhys ap Griffith (1508–1531), who was later executed by Henry VIII for treason as he was considered a threat to Henry VIII and was executed for treason on charges widely believed to be false in 1531 (purportedly for inscribing the name "Fitz Uryan" on his armour).

Gruffydd and Katherine were present with Arthur's younger brother Henry VIII of England when Henry travelled to France for the famous Field of the Cloth of Gold in 1520. Gruffydd's tomb is also in Worcester Cathedral, alongside Prince Arthur's.

Katherine married Peter Edgecumbe. After his death, in July 1543 her friend the diplomat Ralph Sadler recommended her to Henry VIII to be sent to Scotland to join the household of Mary, Queen of Scots. This plan was interrupted by the war of Rough Wooing.
