= Justiciar of South Wales =

The Justiciar of South Wales, sometimes referred to as the Justiciar of West Wales was a royal official of the Principality of Wales during the medieval period. He controlled the southern half of the principality.

== Background ==
Justiciar was a title given to one of the monarch's chief ministers in both England and Scotland during the medieval period, and was introduced to Wales in the 13th century. With the final defeat of the Principality of Wales in 1282, Edward I of England "annexed and united" its territories to the English crown although it did not become part of the Kingdom of England but was the king's personal fief. The governance and constitutional position of the principality after its conquest was set out in the Statute of Rhuddlan of 1284. The new administration comprised a number of royal officials appointed at the King's pleasure, including the Justiciar of South Wales.

== Responsibilities ==
Based at Carmarthen, the Justiciar was responsible for the administration of the southern part of the royal lands in Wales and acted as the King's vice-gerents in the region. The counties within his remit were Carmarthenshire and Cardiganshire. They enjoyed limited powers of patronage to appoint a variety of officials within their territory.

== Notable Justiciars ==
- Robert de Tiptoft
- Maurice de Berkeley, 2nd Baron Berkeley
- Rhys ap Gruffydd
- Rhys ap Thomas
- Edmund FitzAlan, 9th Earl of Arundel
