= Elizabeth, Lady Darcy =

English noblewoman and courtier (1436–1507)

Elizabeth, Lady Darcy (1436–1507) also called Elizabeth Tyrell, was an English noblewoman and courtier. She was the governess of the English royal children, among them the future queen Elizabeth of York and her son Arthur, Prince of Wales, between 1466 and 1497.

== Biography ==
Elizabeth Darcy was born to Sir Thomas Tyrell of Heron and Anne Emma Marn. She married first to Sir Robert Darcy, and secondly to Richard Haute (1434–1487).

She was royal governess for the children of King Edward IV at Eltham Palace After the Tudor dynasty came to power, her former charge Elizabeth of York became queen consort. At the birth of Arthur, Prince of Wales in 1486, Elizabeth Darcy was appointed "lady governess" or lady governor, Elizabeth Gibbs as wet nurse and Alice Bywymbe, Agnes Hobbes and Evelyn Hobbes as rockers. Darcy raised the royal children at Farnham in accordance with the instructions of the king's mother Margaret Beaufort. She retired in 1497 and was succeeded by Elizabeth Denton.
