= Rhys ap Thomas =

Welsh soldier and landowner (1449–1525)

Sir Rhys ap Thomas KG
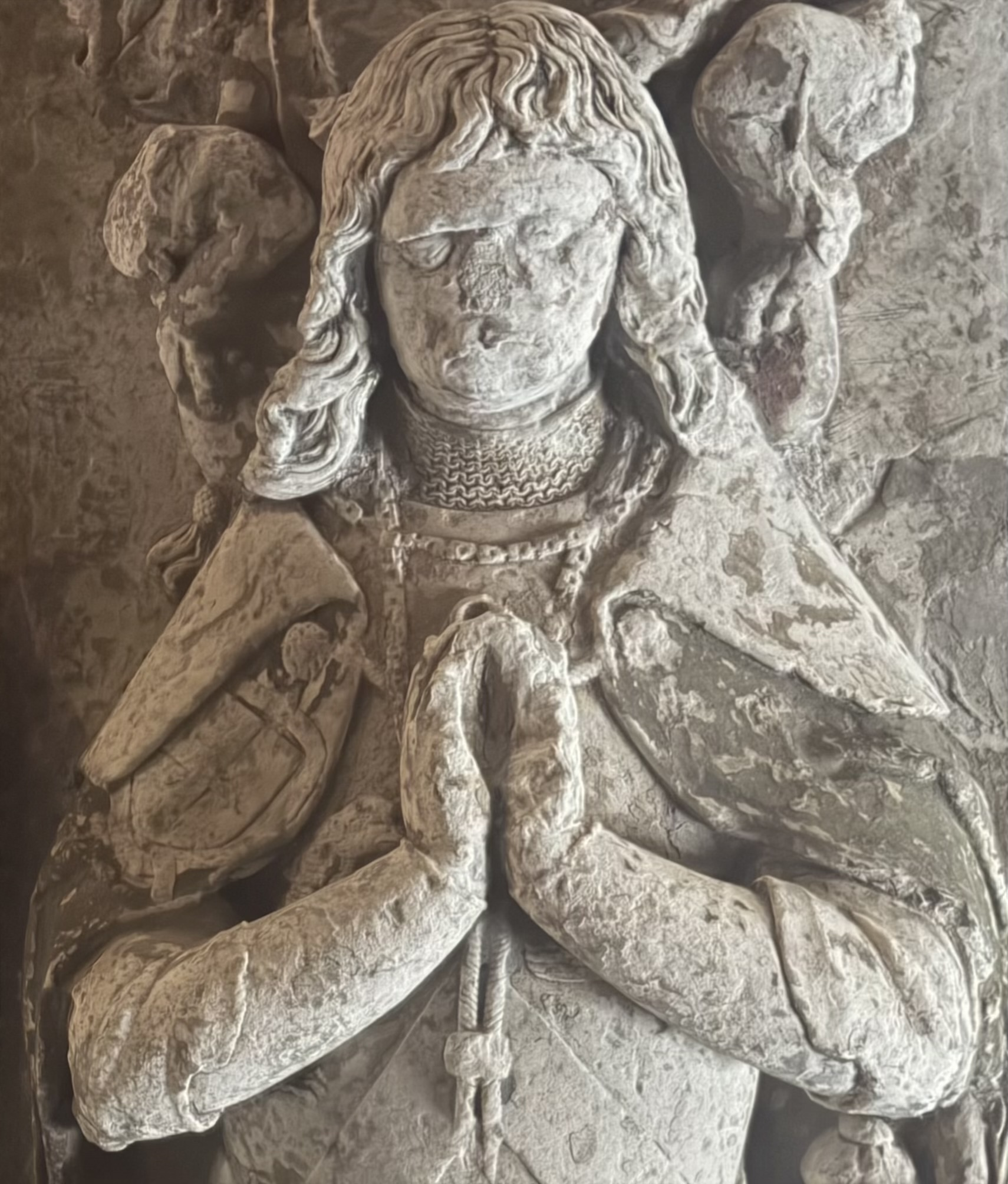
- Detail of Rhys ap Thomas' tomb effigy

Justiciar of South Wales
- In office 4 January 1496 – Summer 1525
- Monarchs: Henry VII; Henry VIII
- Preceded by: Jasper Tudor

Personal details
- Born: c. 1449
- Died: Summer 1525 Carmarthen Priory
- Spouse: Eva ferch Henri ap Gwilym
- Children: Gruffudd ap Rhys
- Parents: Thomas ap Gruffudd (father); Elizabeth ferch John (mother)

Sir Rhys ap Thomas, KG (1449 – 1525) was a Welsh soldier and landowner who rose to prominence during the Wars of the Roses, and was instrumental in the victory of Henry Tudor at the Battle of Bosworth. He remained a faithful supporter of Henry and was rewarded with lands and offices in South Wales.

== Early life ==
Rhys was the youngest legitimate son of Thomas ap Gruffydd ap Nicolas of Llandeilo in Carmarthenshire, and Elizabeth, daughter of Sir John Gruffydd of Abermarlais, also in Carmarthenshire. His grandfather was Gruffudd ap Nicolas, lord of Dinefwr. His maternal great-grandfather, Sir Thomas Griffith, who married Anne, daughter of Sir Walter Blount, was the grandson of Sir Rhys ap Gruffydd, and through him, was a descendant of Ednyfed Fychan as well as of Lord Rhys, Prince of Wales and member of the royal House of Dinefwr.

In 1460, after decades of increasing unrest among the nobility and armed clashes, the supporters of Richard, Duke of York, challenged the right of King Henry VI of the House of Lancaster to rule England. Most Welsh landholders claimed their titles through grants made by Henry's father and grandfather for loyalty to the English crown during the revolt of Owain Glyndŵr. They therefore generally supported Henry, rather than the rival Yorkist claimants to the throne. In 1461, when Rhys ap Thomas was twelve or thirteen, a Lancastrian army raised in Wales under Jasper Tudor, the Earl of Pembroke, moved into England but was defeated at the Battle of Mortimer's Cross by Edward, Earl of March (the eldest son of Richard of York who had been killed a few weeks before). Rhys's grandfather Gruffydd ap Nicholas was killed in the battle. Within a few weeks, Edward had been proclaimed King Edward IV, and the main Lancastrian armies were crushed at the Battle of Towton in Yorkshire.

Some Lancastrians, including Rhys's father Thomas, continued to resist in Wales. Thomas and his brother Owain defended Carreg Cennen Castle near Llandeilo. They were forced to surrender in 1462 after a siege. The victorious Yorkists slighted the castle to prevent it being used as a Lancastrian stronghold again. The lands of the defeated Lancastrians were confiscated, and Thomas, with the young Rhys, went into exile at the court of Philip the Good, the Duke of Burgundy. Thomas and Rhys returned to Wales in 1467, and reacquired at least some of their former lands. This was during a period which included the Readeption of Henry VI, when many former Lancastrians regained their lands, and contrived to keep them even after the subsequent victory of Edward IV in 1471. Thomas died in 1474. Rhys's two elder brothers had already died, and Rhys inherited his father's estates.

== Reign of Richard III ==
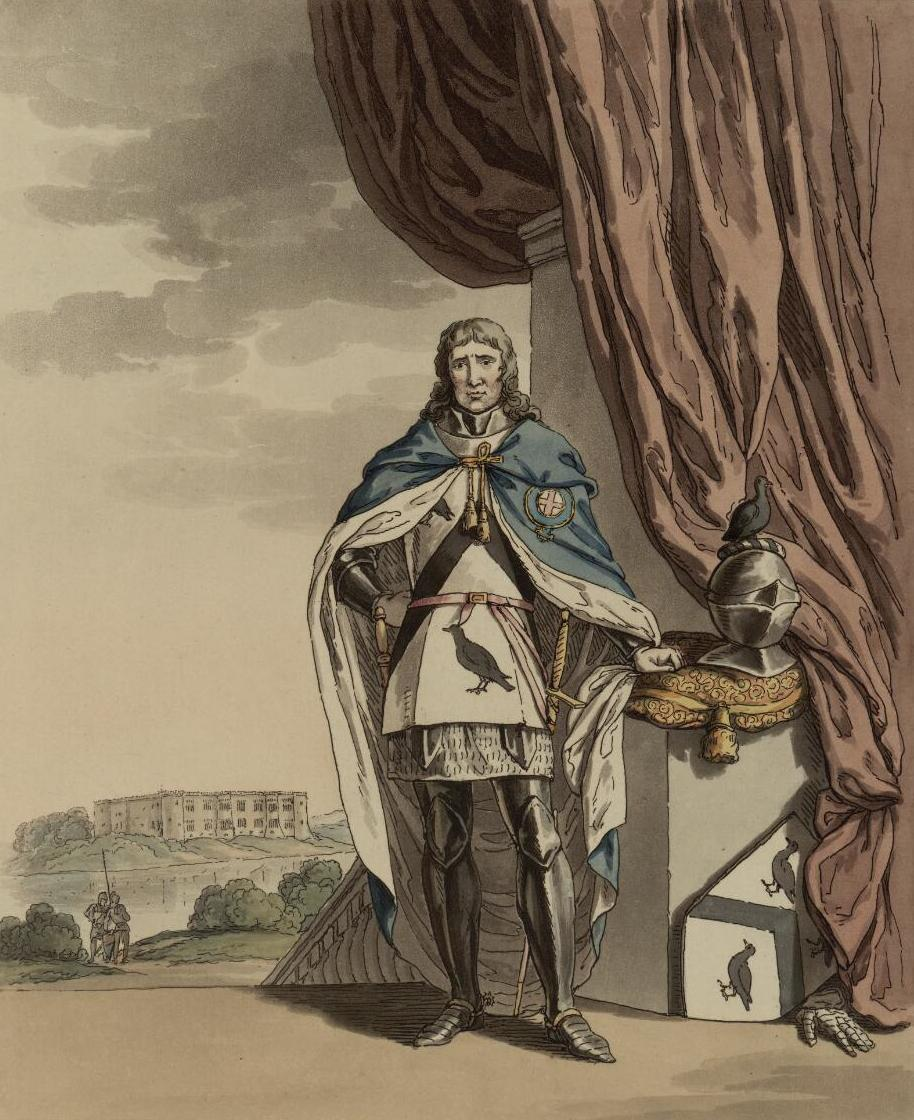
1812 portrait of Rhys

In 1483, Edward IV died. His son Edward V was still a minor. Edward's surviving brother Richard of Gloucester and the Duke of Buckingham moved to prevent the unpopular relatives of Elizabeth Woodville, Edward's Queen, from sharing in power or even dominating the government during the young King's minority. However, Richard went further, declaring Edward's children illegitimate and seizing the throne himself. The young Edward V and his younger brother (the Princes in the Tower) disappeared and were probably murdered. Buckingham turned against Richard and led a revolt aimed at restoring the House of Lancaster, in the person of the exiled Henry Tudor, Earl of Richmond, to the throne. The revolt failed. Buckingham himself had raised a force at Brecon in mid-Wales, but storms and floods prevented him crossing the River Severn to join other rebels in England, and his starving soldiers deserted. He was soon betrayed and executed. The same storms prevented Henry from landing in the West Country.

Rhys had declined to support Buckingham's uprising. In the aftermath, when Richard appointed officers to replace those who had joined the revolt, he made Rhys ap Thomas his principal lieutenant in south west Wales and granted him an annuity for life of 40 marks. Rhys was required to send his son Gruffydd ap Rhys ap Thomas to the King's court at Nottingham as a hostage, but he excused himself from this obligation by claiming that nothing could bind him to his duty more strongly than his conscience. He is supposed to have taken an oath that

Whoever ill-affected to the state, shall dare to land in those parts of Wales where I have any employment under your majesty, must resolve with himself to make his entrance and irruption over my belly.

Nevertheless, he is presumed to have carried on some correspondence with Henry Tudor, who was preparing another attempt in France to overthrow Richard. The intermediary was Dr. Lewis Caerleon, who was personal physician to Lady Margaret Beaufort, Henry Tudor's mother.

== Bosworth campaign ==
On 1 August 1485, Henry set sail from Harfleur in France. With fair winds, he landed at Mill Bay near Dale on the north side of Milford Haven, close to his birthplace in Pembroke Castle, with a force of English exiles and French mercenaries. At this point, Rhys should have engaged him. However, Rhys instead joined Henry. Folklore has it that the Bishop of St. David's offered to absolve him from his previous oath to Richard. The Bishop also suggested that Rhys fulfil the strict letter of his vow by lying down and letting Henry step over him. This undignified procedure might have weakened Rhys's authority over his men, so instead, Rhys is said to have stood under the Mullock Bridge about 2 miles (3.2 km) north of Dale while Henry marched over it.

Henry's and Rhys's forces marched separately through Wales, with Rhys recruiting 500 men as he proceeded. They rejoined at Welshpool before crossing into England. Rhys's Welsh force was described as being large enough to have "annihilated" the rest of Henry's army. On 22 August, they met Richard's army near Market Bosworth. In the resulting Battle of Bosworth, Richard launched an attack led by John Howard, 1st Duke of Norfolk. According to a contemporary ballad, Rhys's men halted the assault. "Norfolk's line began to break under pressure from Rhys ap Thomas's men" and the Duke was killed by an arrow shot. Hoping to turn the tide and win the battle rapidly by killing his rival, Richard and his companion knights charged directly at Henry. The king was unhorsed and surrounded.

The poet Guto'r Glyn narrates the death of Richard III in his surviving panegyric to Rhys ap Thomas. It has previously been suggested that Guto credits Rhys personally with the killing blow based on line 38 of the poem: Lladd y baedd, eilliodd ei ben 'killing the boar, he shaved his head'. A white boar was the symbol of Richard, but, Dafydd Johnston notes that the grammatical subject of the phrase in this poem is y Cing Harri 'King Henry' in line 35. The reference to the shaving likely refers instead to a post mortem ritual shaving of Richard's head, to be compared with the shaving of a boar's head before cooking. Nevertheless, the poet does appear to suggest Richard was killed by a group of soldiers led by Rhys.

== Later life ==
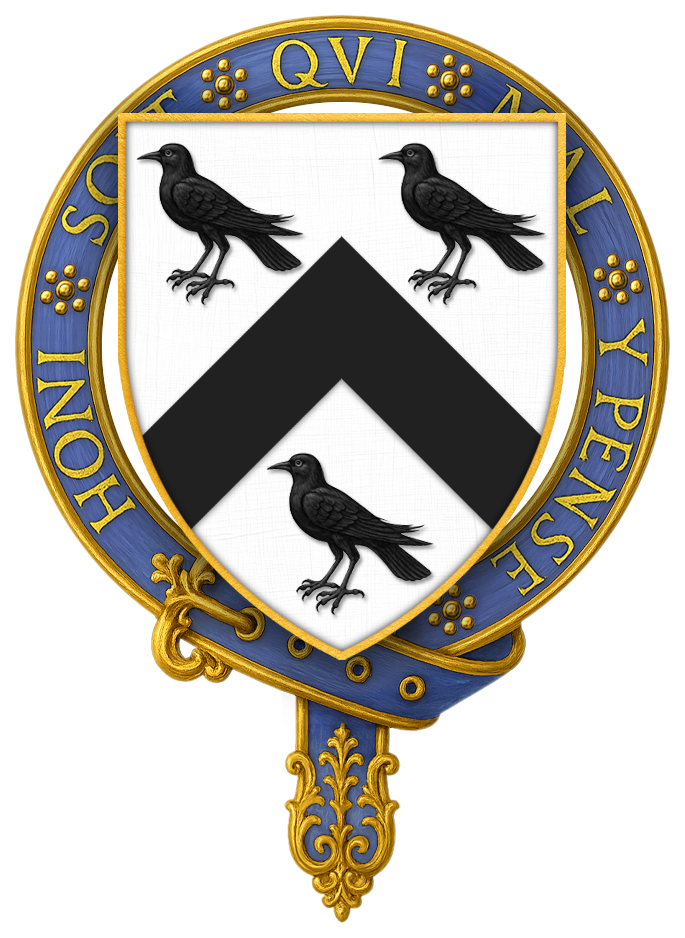
Rhys ap Thomas' coat of arms

Rhys demonstrated his continuing loyalty to Henry by suppressing a Yorkist rebellion at Brecon in 1486, and taking part in the campaign against the pretender Lambert Simnel in 1487 and the subsequent campaigns against Perkin Warbeck. He played a part in the defeat of the Cornish Rebellion of 1497, capturing the rebel leader Lord Audeley, for which he was awarded the honour of knight banneret. As reward for his loyalty to Henry, he acquired many lands and lucrative offices in South Wales. He was appointed Constable and Lieutenant of Breconshire, Chamberlain of Carmarthenshire and Cardiganshire, Seneschall and Chancellor of Haverfordwest, Rouse and Builth, Justiciar of South Wales, and Governor of all Wales.

He was also a Privy Councillor and in 1505 he was made a Knight of the Garter, which he celebrated with a great tournament at Carew Castle in 1507. After the death of Henry VII, he remained a supporter of his son, Henry VIII and took part in the Battle of the Spurs in 1513, where the troops under his command captured four French standards. He was one of the Garter Knights to accompany Henry VIII in 1520 at his meeting with Francis I of France at the Field of the Cloth of Gold. Rhys was married twice: to Eva, daughter of Henri ap Gwilym of Cwrt Henri; and to Janet, daughter of Thomas Mathew of Radyr, who was widow of Thomas Stradling of St Donats. However, although Rhys had numerous mistresses and several illegitimate children, his legitimate son Gruffydd ap Rhys ap Thomas died in 1521. Rhys himself died at Carmarthen Priory in 1525. After Henry VIII suppressed the monasteries, Rhys's tomb was moved to St. Peter's Church, also in Carmarthen.

Rhys's estates and offices were meant to pass to his grandson and heir Rhys ap Gruffydd, however they were taken by the Crown and given to Lord Ferrers for life. Rhys ap Gruffydd was later beheaded by Henry VIII in 1531 for treason after fighting Ferrers and provoking civil unrest amongst the citizens of Carmarthen who were still angry about the disinheritance. The current claimed heirs of Rhys's are the Lords Dynevor, although with existing unclaimed heirs; with the most famous and prominent being the Evanses of Carmarthen, Vaughans of Carreg Cennen Castle, Morgans of Llandeilo and Williamses of Dynevor Castle. Each of these unclaimed heirs all claim to be a descendant from one or multiple of Rhys's illegitimate children with each having claim to the baronetcy whilst also having claims in their own rights [Speculation from Oral Traditions carried out in Carmarthenshire].

== Works cited ==
- Johnston, Dafydd, ed. (2013). "Moliant i Syr Rhys ap Tomas o Abermarlais". Guto'r Glyn.net. Aberystwyth: Centre for Advanced Welsh and Celtic Studies. Archived from the original on 19 June 2015.
