= Rhys ap Gruffudd (rebel) =

Welsh landowner

The coat of arms of Rhys's family

Rhys ap Gruffudd (1508 – December 1531) was a powerful Welsh landowner who was accused of rebelling against King Henry VIII by plotting with James V of Scotland to become Prince of Wales. He was executed as a rebel. He married Lady Katherine Howard (b. abt 1499 Ashwellthorpe, Norfolk, England), the daughter of Thomas Howard, 2nd Duke of Norfolk and his second wife Agnes Tilney.

By this marriage, he became the uncle of Anne Boleyn and Catherine Howard, and granduncle of Queen Elizabeth I.

== Early life ==
Rhys was the grandson of Rhys ap Thomas, the most powerful man in Wales and close ally of Henry VIII. His father, Gruffudd ap Rhys ap Thomas, died in 1521, leaving him his grandfather's heir. In 1524 Rhys married Katherine Howard, daughter of Thomas Howard, 2nd Duke of Norfolk.

His mother was Katherine St. John, Lady Edgecombe.

As his grandfather's heir, Rhys expected to inherit his estates and titles. When Rhys ap Thomas died in 1525, Henry VIII gave his most important titles and powers to Walter Devereux, Lord Ferrers, leading to a feud between Rhys and Ferrers, which escalated over the next few years.

== Conflict with Ferrers ==
Rhys attempted to increase his status in Wales, petitioning Cardinal Thomas Wolsey to be given various posts. The potential for conflict with Ferrers increased when both men were given the right to extend their number of retainers; this led to the emergence of competing armed gangs. The bad blood between Rhys and Ferrers reached a crisis point in June 1529 when Ferrers made a display of his status during preparations for the annual Court of Great Sessions in Carmarthen. Rhys, surrounded by forty armed men, threatened Ferrers with a knife. Rhys was arrested and imprisoned in Carmarthen Castle. Rhys's wife Katherine escalated the situation by collecting hundreds of her supporters and attacking the castle. She later threatened Ferrers himself with an armed gang. In the conflict between the two factions, several of Ferrers's men were killed. The factions continued to cause other disruptions over the coming months, leading to deaths in street fights and acts of piracy.

== Treason charges ==
The rebellious actions of Rhys's supporters led to Rhys's transfer to prison in London in 1531. By this stage, Henry was claiming that Rhys was attempting to overthrow his government in Wales. Rhys had added the title Fitz-Urien to his name, referring to Urien, the ancient Welsh ruler of Rheged, a person of mythical significance. Rhys's accusers claimed that this was an attempt to assert himself as Prince of Wales. He was supposed to be plotting with James V of Scotland to overthrow Henry in fulfilment of ancient Welsh prophecies.

Rhys was convicted of treason and was executed in December 1531. The execution caused widespread dismay and he was openly said to have been innocent. Contemporary writer Ellis Gruffudd, however, argued that the arrogance of the Rhys family had caused their downfall, saying that "many men regarded his death as Divine retribution for the falsehoods of his ancestors, his grandfather, and great-grandfather, and for their oppressions and wrongs. They had many a deep curse from the poor people who were their neighbours, for depriving them of their homes, lands and riches."

Historian Ralph Griffith asserts that "Rhys's execution...was an act of judicial murder based on charges devised to suit the prevailing political and dynastic situation". Since it was linked to Henry's attempt to centralise power and break with the church of Rome, he argues that it "in retrospect made him [Rhys] one of the earliest martyrs of the English Reformation." Rhys was believed to be opposed to the Reformation and had spoken disparagingly of Anne Boleyn. He had also been friendly with Katherine of Aragon and Cardinal Wolsey, so ridding himself of Rhys helped Henry to prepare the ground for the Reformation. The execution led to fears of a Welsh rebellion. One clergyman was concerned that the Welsh and Irish would join together.

== Family ==
With his death, Rhys' vast possessions were forfeit to the crown. His children are known by the Anglicised surname "Rice" or "Ryse". His son, Griffith Rice (c.1530–1584), was restored to some of the family estates by Queen Mary. His daughter Agnes Rice had a much-publicised affair with William Stourton, 7th Baron Stourton, and in defiance of the rights of his widow and children, she inherited much of the Stourton estates after his death in 1548. She later married Sir Edward Baynton, and had children with both William and Edward.
