= Cotehele =

Historic house in Calstock, United Kingdom

- Kosheyl (Cornish)
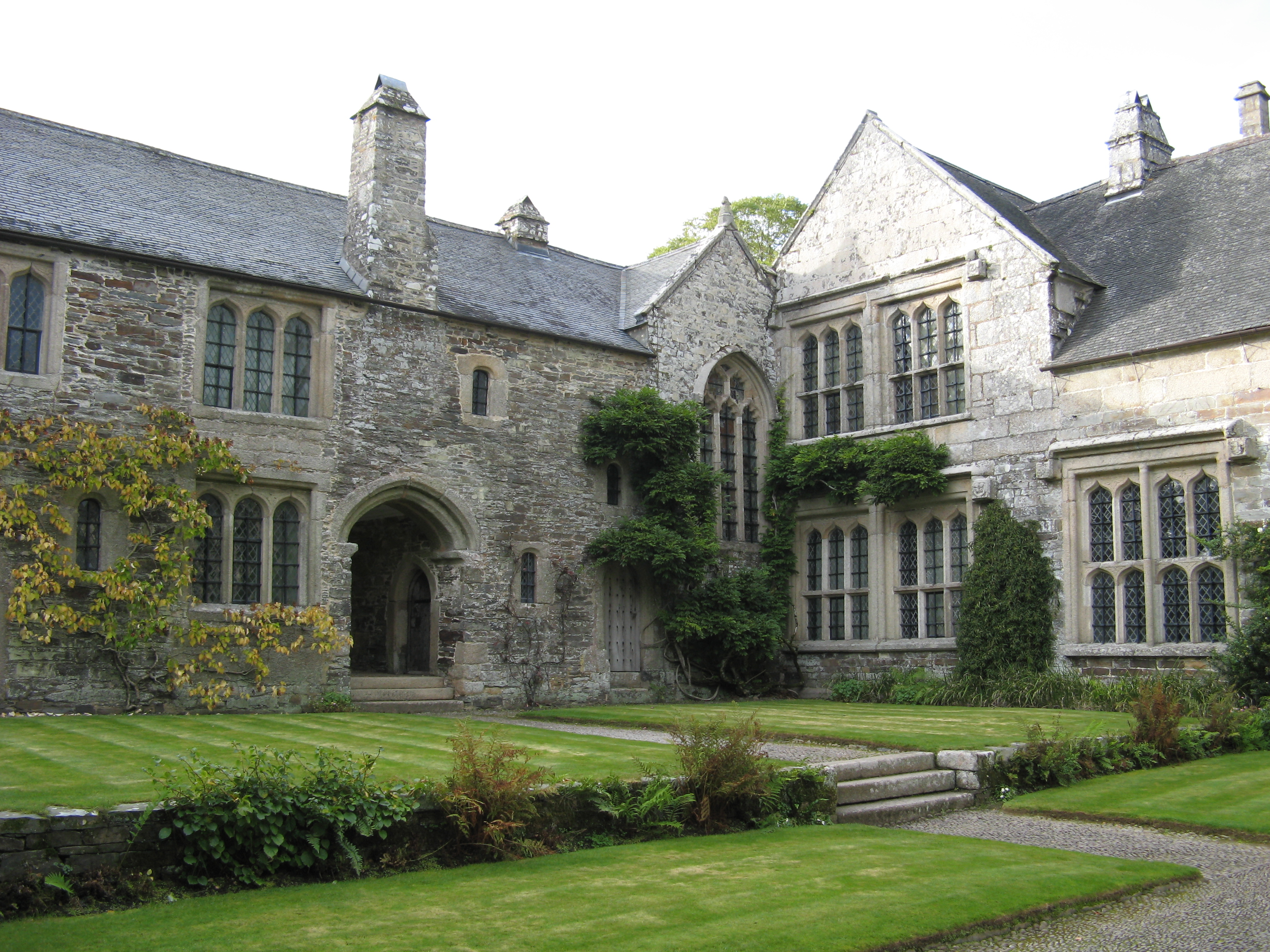
- Courtyard of Cotehele House

- Location within Cornwall
- 50°29′45″N 4°13′33″W
- Type: Country house
- Location: Calstock
- OS grid reference: SX4224068618

Site notes
- Area: Cornwall
- Architectural styles: Medieval & Tudor
- Owner: National Trust

Listed Building – Grade I
- Official name: Cotehele House
- Designated: 21 July 1951
- Reference no.: 1140255

National Register of Historic Parks and Gardens
- Official name: Cotehele
- Designated: 11 June 1987
- Reference no.: 1000648

Cotehele (Cornish: Kosheyl, meaning wooded estuary) is a medieval house with Tudor additions, situated in the parish of Calstock in the east of Cornwall, England, and now belonging to the National Trust. It is a rambling granite and slate-stone manor house on the banks of the River Tamar that has been little changed over five centuries. It was rebuilt by the Edgcumbe family after Sir Richard Edgcumbe was financially rewarded for supporting Henry Tudor at the Battle of Bosworth in 1485.

== History ==
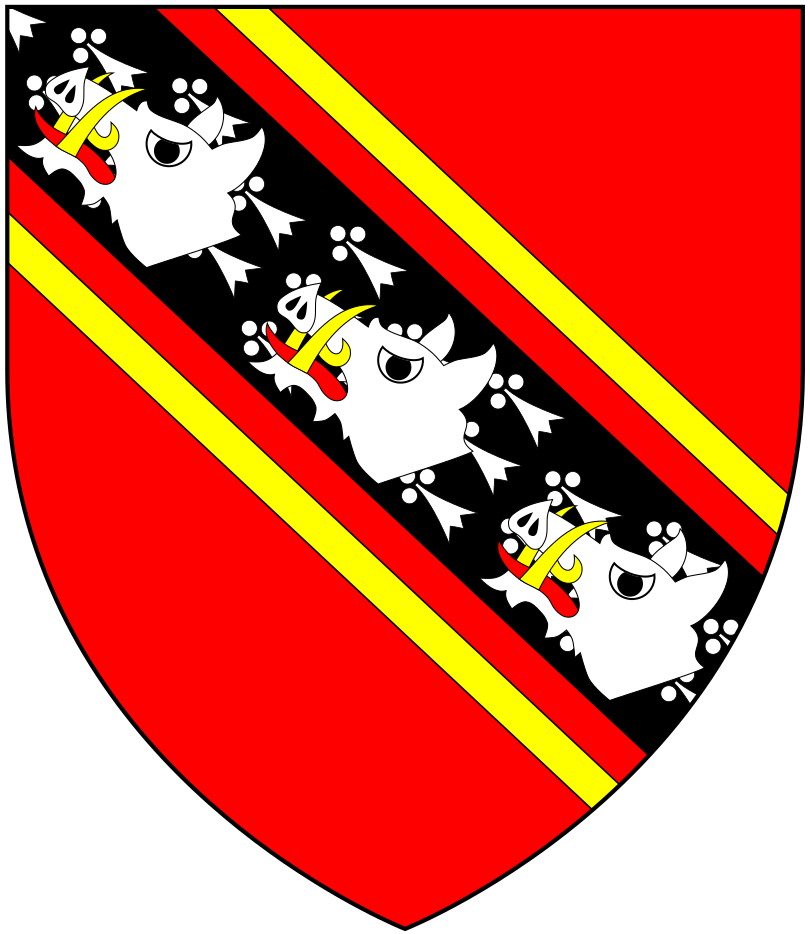
Arms of Edgcumbe, Earls of Mount Edgcumbe: Gules, on a bend ermines cotised or three boar's heads couped argent

A William de Cotehele is recorded in 1270, suggesting that there may have been a house on the site by this time. The house was acquired by William Edgcumbe through his marriage to Hilaria, heiress of Cotehele, in 1353. The earliest parts of the present house may be early 15th century - the chapel was licensed in 1411 - but there is no certain evidence predating Sir Richard Edgcumbe's reconstruction after 1485. This work continued until the 1560s, creating a large manor house rambling around three courtyards.

In 1547-53, Richard Edgcumbe II built the more fashionable Mount Edgcumbe House, and Cotehele was relegated to being a second home before it was even complete. This preserved the house in its Tudor state, though it also led to its being neglected. Nonetheless, the house was reoccupied by Colonel Piers Edgcumbe in the mid-17th century, after Mount Edgcumbe was damaged in the English Civil War. Colonel Piers was a Royalist, and may have retreated to the more isolated Cotehele to avoid unwanted attention during the Interregnum, though he remained there after the Restoration until his death in 1666 or 1667. He modified the house's private apartments, ceiling off and partitioning the Great Chamber and adding a new staircase.

Colonel Piers' son, Richard Edgcumbe IV, returned to Mount Edgcumbe. His son, Richard, 1st Baron Edgcumbe, remodelled Mount Edgcumbe around 1742, and sent its old furnishings to Cotehele. This began a tradition of filling Cotehele with historic furniture and tapestries, and presenting it as a Romantic and antiquarian attraction. Visitors to the house included King George III and Queen Charlotte (1789), and Queen Victoria (1846 and 1856). Victoria thought the tapestried rooms 'very cheerless,' as she noted in her diary.

After Ernest, 3rd Earl of Mount Edgcumbe died in 1861, his son William, 4th Earl restored the east range of Cotehele as a dower house for Lady Caroline, Ernest's widow. This range was separate from the hall and state rooms of the "Old House", which were developing as a visitor attraction. The house's first guidebook was written at this time, and illustrated by Nicholas Condy (see below).

The Edgcumbes again returned to Cotehele in the Second World War, after Mount Edgcumbe was gutted by German incendiaries in 1941. It was the first property to be accepted by the Treasury in payment of death duty. The house and estate are now under the care of the National Trust. The house is a Grade I listed building, having been so designated on 21 July 1951. Cotehele is known for its annual flower garland, which is hung in the great hall.

== The house ==
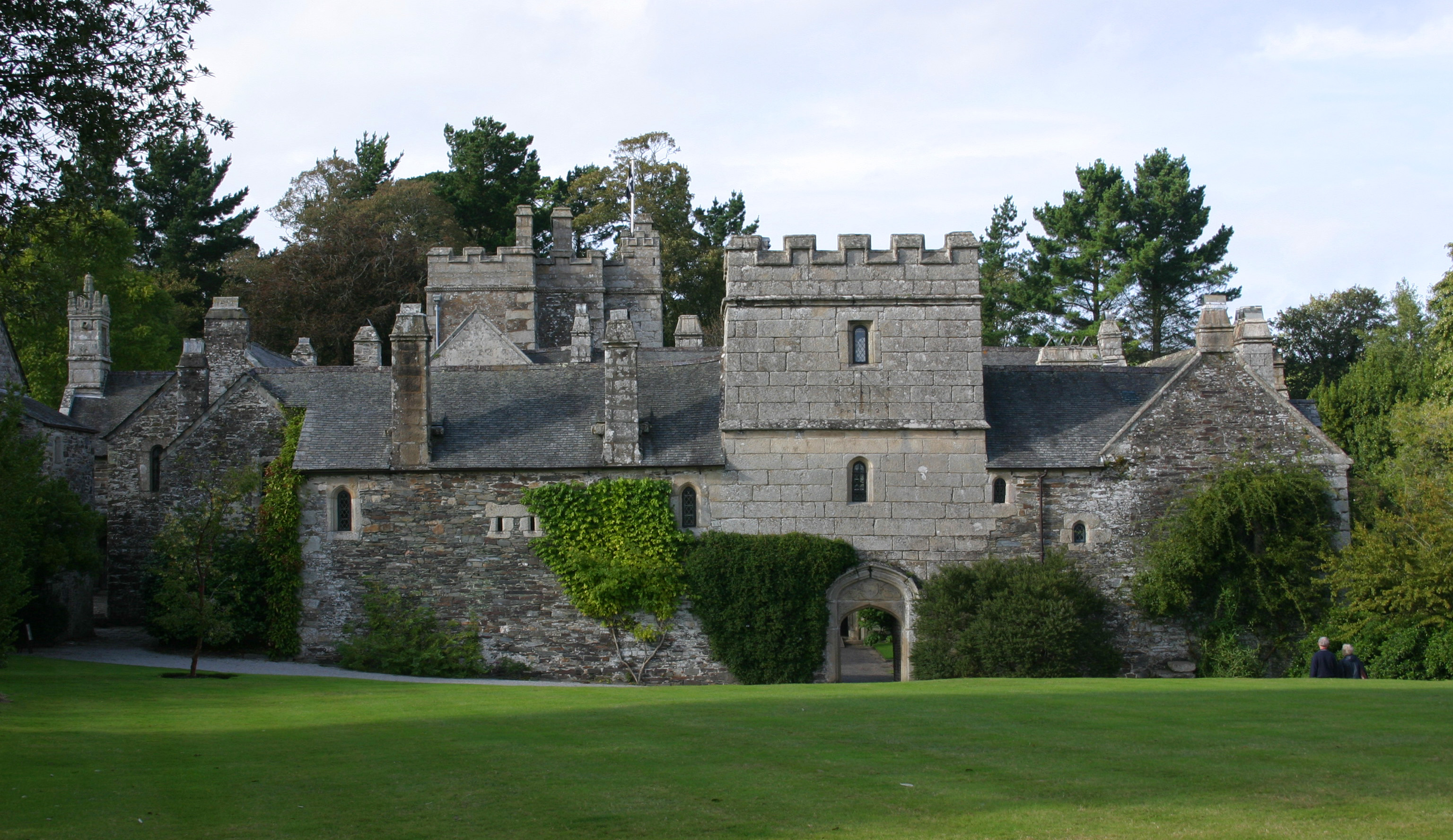
The house from the south. The chapel bellcote and the north-west tower are in the background.

Cotehele is one of the least altered Tudor houses in the United Kingdom. It is built around three courts: Hall Court, Retainers' Court and Kitchen Court. There is also a Base Court in front of the house, which contains the barn (now the café).

Sir Richard Edgcumbe seems to have been involved in the first phase of development from 1486 to 1489, with his son Sir Piers Edgcumbe taking over for the second phase, from 1489 to 1520. In general, the earlier work is built of slate rubble, while the 16th century work uses large, expensively-cut blocks of granite ashlar, particularly in the gatehouse, hall and north-west tower. The building history is made more complex by the use of conservative architectural details, and the reuse and re-location of earlier features, most notably the entire hall roof.

=== Hall Court ===
Hall Court appears to have been the full extent of the late 15th century house, though the original hall was smaller than the present one. It has two entries: the main one from the south, and a lesser one from Retainers' Court to the west. The main entrance has a prominent tower of c. 1520-30, and a ribbed tunnel-vaulted passage. The western entrance has no tower, but is defended by a gunloop. The external walls are mostly pierced with small, barred windows, suggesting that security was still a concern. The east range was much rebuilt in 1861-2, particularly on the side facing the garden. The service ranges around the court were heightened to their present two storeys in the 16th century.

==== Great Hall ====
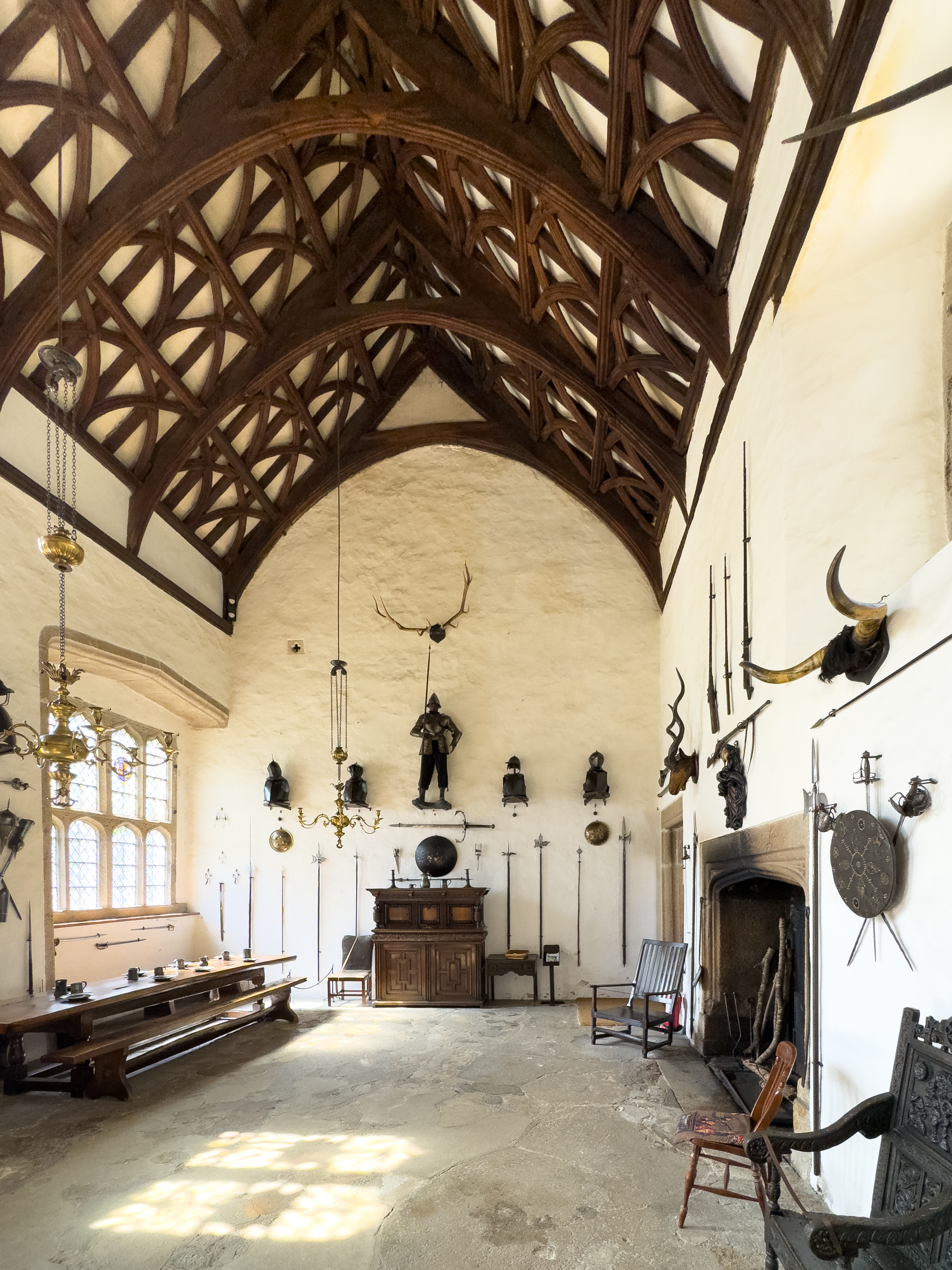
The great hall, facing the high table

The great hall is, as was usual, the largest and most impressive room in the house, standing to the north of Hall Court. It was widened in the early 16th century, when the elaborate arch braced roof was constructed. Dendrochronology has given the roof timbers a felling date of c. 1500. The hall was raised to its present height in the 1520s (the new work being clearly distinguished by its use of granite ashlar) and the roof dismantled and re-erected at the new level. The former dais is lit by a large mullion-and-transom window, while the services are accessed by the traditional three doors. There is no surviving evidence of a screens passage.

==== Private apartments ====
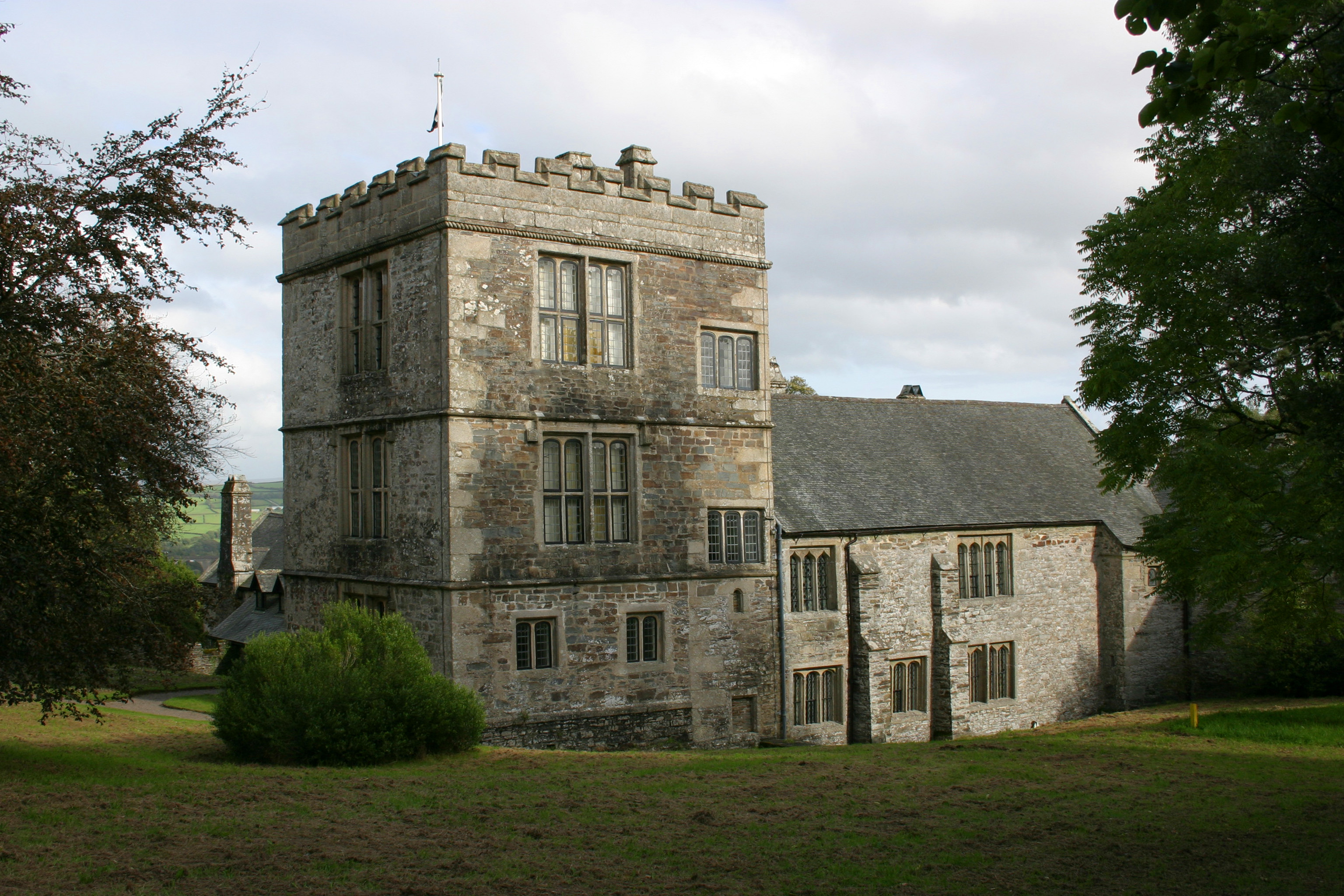
The north-west tower (left) and private apartments (right)

The private apartments occupy the north-west corner of the house, accessed from a stair in the hall. They originally consisted of a single grand room, soon replaced with a parlour below, and a great chamber or solar above. The great chamber had an impressive arch-braced roof, like that of the hall. The north-west tower was added in the mid- or late 16th century to extend the apartments, as a rather anachronistic solar tower in the manner of great medieval houses. The tower contains the White Room, the Old Drawing Room, Queen Anne's Room and King Charles' Room. The apartments were much altered in the 1650s by Colonel Piers. He divided the parlour into the Dining Room and Punch Room, and the great chamber into the South Room, Red Room and Upper Landing, as well as ceiling off the old roof and rebuilding the stair.

==== Chapel ====
On the west side of Hall Court are the vicarage and the chapel. The chapel is connected to the main building via a small passageway leading to the dining room. The patron saints are St. Katharine and St. Anne. The chapel is among the oldest rooms in the house, with parts of the north wall possibly dating from the 1411 licence. The bellcote is early 16th century and resembles those found in Brittany.

=== Kitchen Court ===
Kitchen Court, behind the great hall, is the smallest of the three courts, and has been extensively altered. Much of it is now filled with Colonel Piers' stair of 1652. The high Tudor kitchen survives, with its oven and large fireplaces.

=== Retainers' Court ===
Retainers' Court was an early 16th century addition, now surrounded with much-altered lodging ranges. These would have been a mixture of private chambers and dormitories for the Edgcumbes' retainers and servants. Retainers' Court also contains the malthouse, brewhouse and dairy. The chapel projects into this court.

=== Contents ===
Notable contents include the Cotehele cupboard and the Cotehele clock in the chapel. This turret clock is the oldest unaltered domestic clock in England, and is still operational. The house contains many tapestries that came, along with much of the furniture, from Mount Edgcumbe House. Regrettably, some have had pieces cut out to fit them in their new locations. The chapel retains some original stained glass and woodwork, as well as an early 16th century Flemish painting of the Crucifixion.

== The estate ==
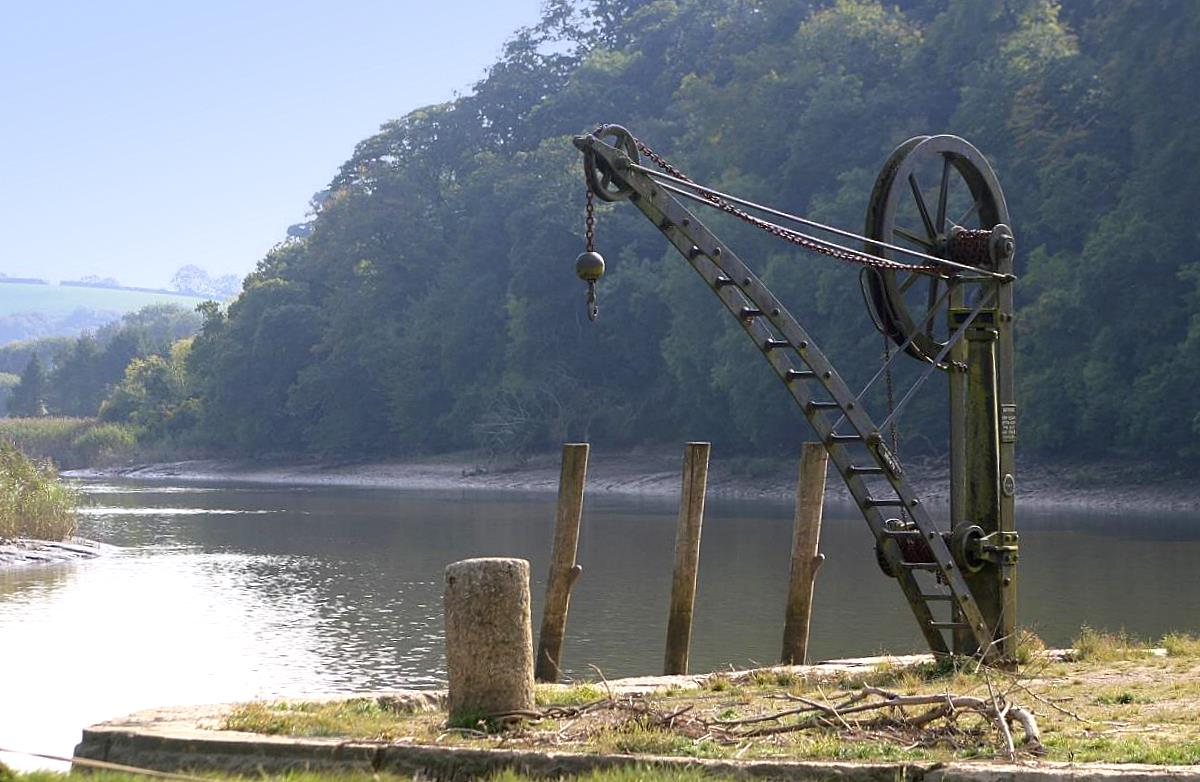
The Tamar at Cotehele Quay

The grounds stretch down to a quay on the River Tamar where there is an outpost of the National Maritime Museum. This quay is home to the preserved Tamar barge Shamrock (built 1899). There are a number of formal gardens and a richly planted area in the valley; features include a well-preserved medieval dovecote, a stewpond, a Victorian summerhouse and the eighteenth century Prospect Tower. The gardens and parkland are listed as Grade II* on the Register of Parks and Gardens of Special Historic Interest in England. The south west side of the estate is bordered by the Morden stream which joins the Tamar at the quay. The estate mill is fed by this stream. The mill was used to grind grain bought in Plymouth and brought upriver on the barge Myrtle, and also to drive a sawmill and a generator for electricity. The Grade II listed mill has been restored to working order, producing flour for use in the restaurant as well as for sale.

In 2008 a 'Mother Orchard' of over 250 apple trees, mainly of West-country varieties, was planted. The 8 acre orchard site is divided into eating, culinary and cider varieties.

=== Woodland Chapel ===
In the grounds of Cotehele, directly east of the House close to the River Tamar, lies a peaceful, basic chapel. inside there are pews going around the walls, two minister's benches and a very ornate table. The patron saints of the chapel are St George and St Thomas Becket. The chapel was built by Sir Richard Edgcumbe (died 1489) between 1485 and 1489 as a thanksgiving for his escape from forces loyal to Richard III in 1483.

=== The Edgcumbe Chapel ===
The Edgcumbe Chapel (built 1558) is located in the east of the north aisle at St. Andrew's Church, Calstock. It contains two monuments of the late 17th century: to Colonel Piers Edgcumbe (d.1666 or 1667) and to Jemima, Countess of Sandwich (d.1674). It is no longer a chapel, but used by ministers to store religious items.

== Nicholas Condy ==
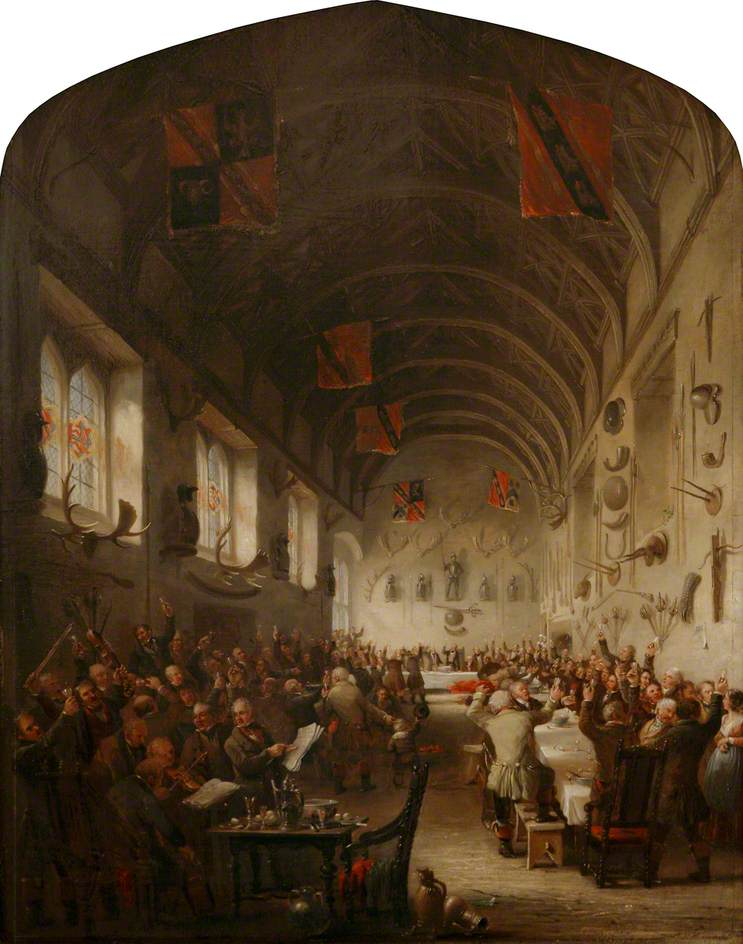
The Court Dinner at Cotehele, by Nicholas Condy

The artist Nicholas Condy (1793-1857) made watercolours and paintings of Cotehele and the 2nd and 3rd Earls of Mount Edgcumbe were his patrons. Condy's painting, The Court Dinner at Cotehele, and watercolours of the outside of Cotehele are on display in Mount Edgcumbe House

== Film location ==
Cotehele was used in the filming of Trevor Nunn's 1996 film adaptation of Twelfth Night. it was used for scenes taking place in the quayside tavern and the inside of Orsino's castle.

== Gallery ==
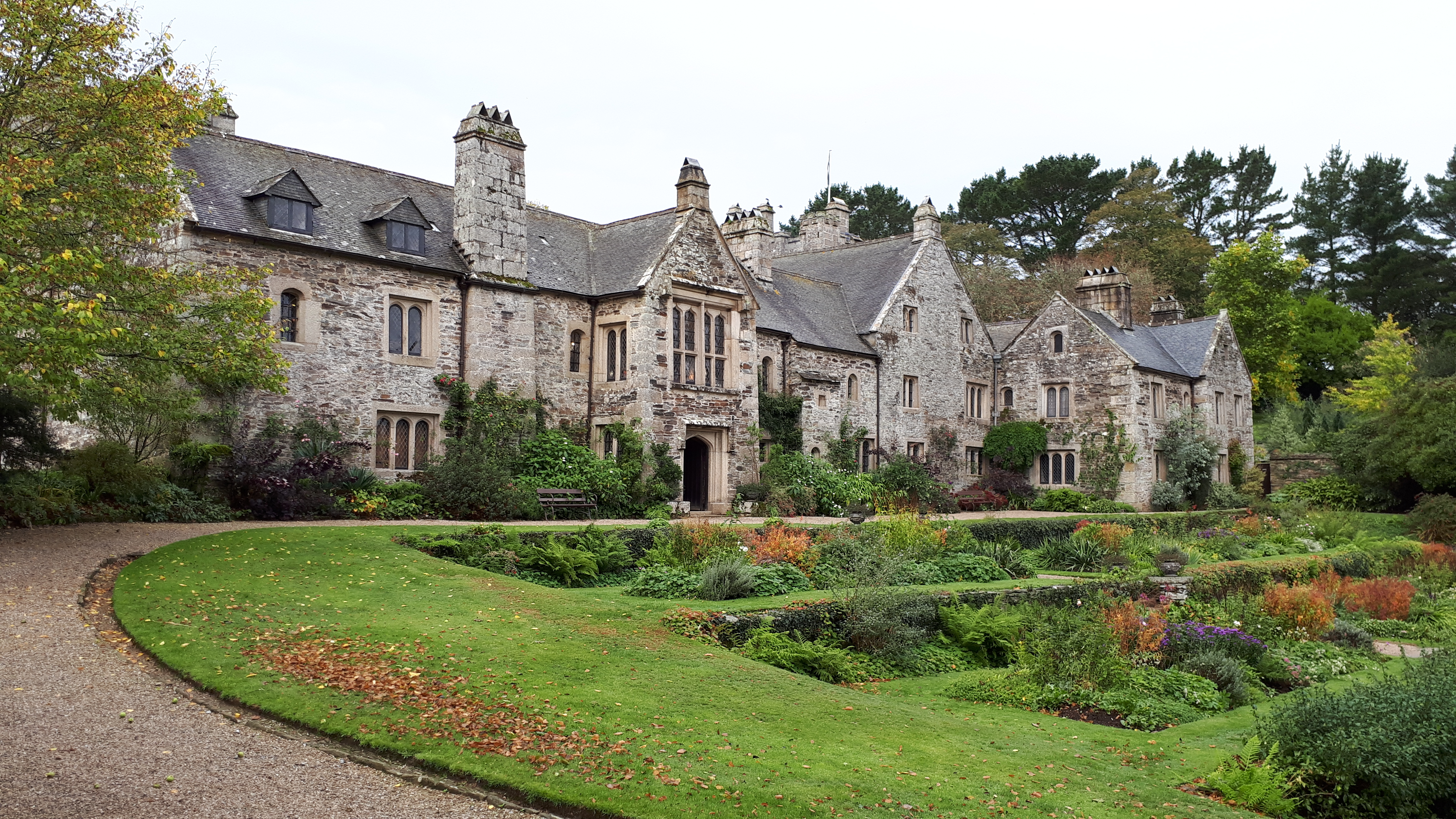
Main building and garden

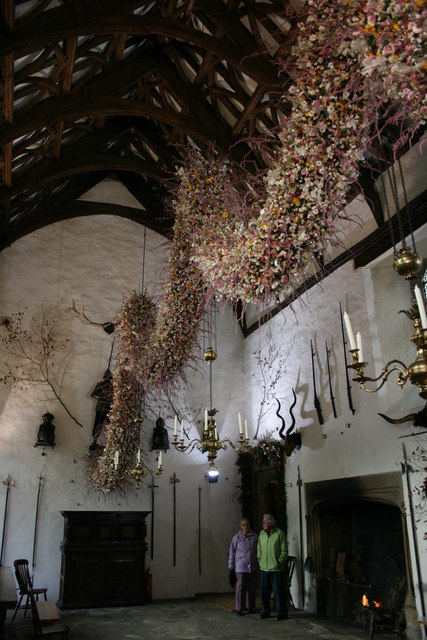
Flower garlands at Cotehele

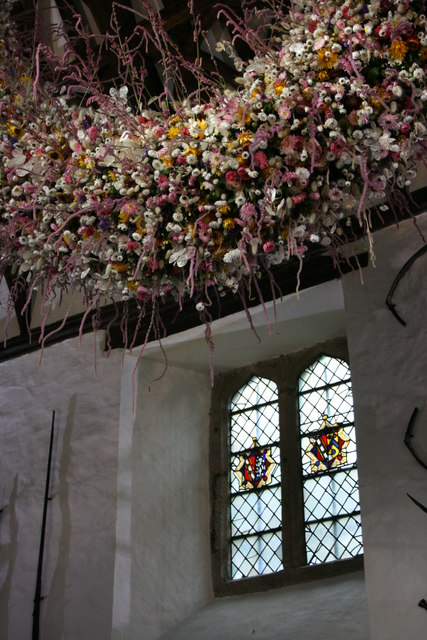
Flower garlands at Cotehele

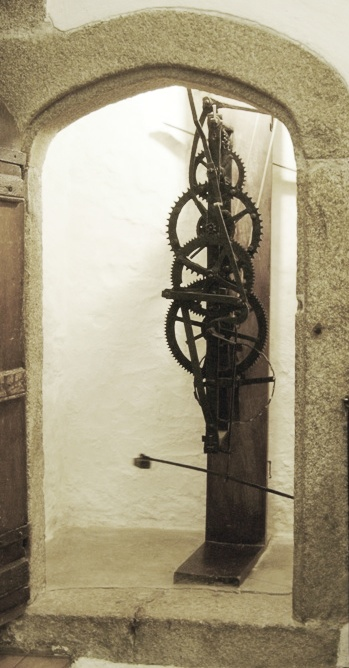
The Cotehele Clock in the chapel

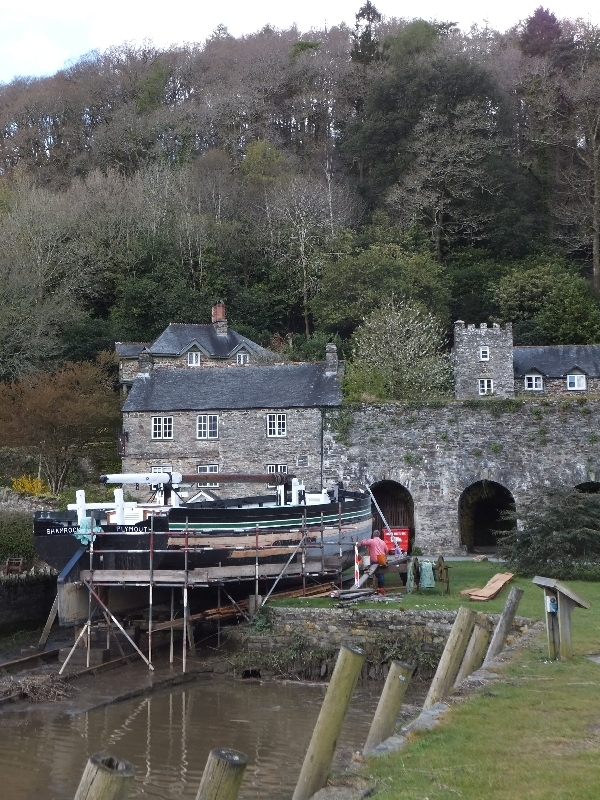
Shamrock at Cotehele Quay

== See also ==
- Mount Edgcumbe House
- Cotehele clock
- List of topics related to Cornwall

== Sources ==
- Emery, Anthony (2006). The Greater Medieval Houses of England and Wales. Vol. 3. Cambridge: Cambridge University Press. pp. 522–529.
- Hunt, Rachel (2023) [2013]. Cotehele (3rd ed.). Swindon: National Trust.
