= Maredudd ap Rhys =

Welsh poet and priest

Maredudd ap Rhys (fl. 1450–1485), also spelt Meredudd ap Rhys, was a Welsh language poet and priest from Powys. He was born in gentry, having pedigree blood, as discovered from the Peniarth Manuscripts. He is thought to have been the bardic tutor to Dafydd ab Edmwnd, and thus won distinction both as a poet and as a poetry teacher.

== Priesthood ==
Maredudd lived at Ruabon as parish priest. While some sources date this position to 1430, no evidence of his vicarhood this early can be found. By 1450, he was also rector of Meifod and Welshpool. In the 1480s, Guto'r Glyn accused Maredudd of hankering after his place in Valle Crucis abbey.

== Poetry ==
Various manuscripts attribute at least twenty-one cywyddau (a form of Welsh metre) to Maredudd on the theme of love, religion and nature. He wrote both private and social as well as prophetic poems. However, only five of his poems have ever been printed. Within his poems, Maredudd had taken inspiration from Dafydd ap Gwilym, among other earlier poets, similarly composing a cywydd to the wind. He also wrote two lyrical cywyddau following the death of two priestly friends, wherein he accused winter of preventing his seeing his friends more often and praised spring as their ally.

Maredudd was fond of fishing and thus wrote a humorous poem concerning the coracle and a 'begging poem' on fishing-nets, where Maredudd compares himself with Madog ab Owain Gwynedd, this being the earliest certain reference to the man believed at one point to have discovered America in the 12th century.

Some of Maredudd's prophetic poetry presents himself as among the seers of the 15th century, as he questions the teaching that fate would ensure that the anarchy prevailing in Wales at the time would reduce. He complains of the endless killings of lords and in war, writing of the uncertainty of life. In 1483, he also wrote an elegy for king Edward IV, who he hoped would restore peace in Wales.

Maredudd's religious poems often took the form of didactic poems of God as the creator, of the passion of Christ and of the intercession of the Virgin Mary. One poem tells the story of a man cured of agonising hip pain through the 'Living Image' at St. John's church, Chester. In this church, he claims that the deaf will have their hearing restored, speech will be given to the dumb, sight to the blind and life to the dead.

== Personal life ==
Maredudd ap Rhys married a woman named Angharad, who bore him a son named Siôn and a daughter.
