= Gwawdodyn =

Traditional Welsh poetic four-line or six-line stanza

Gwawdodyn (Welsh pronunciation: [gwau̯'doːdɨn]) is a metre of Welsh poetry which exists in two forms. The more common Gwawdodyn byr ("short gwawdodyn") is a four-line stanza with lines of 9, 9, 10, and 9 syllables. It consists of a couplet in the 9-syllable metre cyhydedd naw ban ("nine-part length") followed by a toddaid couplet.

The less common Gwawdodyn hir ("long gwawdodyn") is a six-line stanza with lines of 9, 9, 9, 9, 10, and 9 syllables, that is to say, two cyhydedd naw ban couplets followed by a toddaid couplet.

In both cases, the same main rhyme is used throughout the stanza, but in the penultimate line, as is usual in a toddaid, the main rhyme comes one, two, or three syllables before the end of the line and is followed by an additional word or words called a gair cyrch, which rhymes with the word before the caesura in the last line. In writing there is usually a dash before the gair cyrch. In Dafydd ap Gwilym, the gair cyrch most often has two syllables, less often one syllable, and least often three syllables.

Each line of a gwawdodyn stanza is ornamented with the Welsh system of internal rhyme and alliteration known as cynghanedd. There may also be cymeriad llythrennol, meaning that the same initial letter is used throughout the stanza.

Each line has a caesura or break (Welsh gorffwysfa or "pausing place"), usually after the fifth syllable, but sometimes after the 4th. There are two accents in each half-line.

Both forms of gwawdodyn are included in the list of 24 traditional Welsh poetic metres whose use is specified in competitions for the bardic chair at the National Eisteddfod of Wales.

The name gwawdodyn is derived from gwawd "hymn of praise, eulogy".

== Gwawdodyn byr ==
=== An example from Dafydd ap Gwilym ===
The gwawdodyn metre is used in two poems by the 14th-century poet Dafydd ap Gwilym. One is Moliant Hywel, Deon Bangor ("Praise of Hywel, Dean of Bangor"). In this, three stanzas of englyn unodl union begin the poem, before the metre changes to gwawdodyn byr for another eight stanzas. Throughout these eight stanzas the main rhyme is -aidd and almost every line begins with "N". This feature, in which the same letter is repeated at the beginning of each line, is known as cymeriad llythrennol.

The other poem is Moliant Ieuan Llwyd ab Ieuan Fwyaf ("Praise of Ieuan Llwyd ab Ieuan Fwyaf"), which consists of 12 four-line stanzas written entirely in the gwawdodyn byr metre. The main rhyme -aeth is continued throughout the poem. The lines of the first four stanzas all start with "N", the lines of stanzas 5 to 8 all start with "G", and the lines of stanzas 9 to 12 all start with "D".

The first stanza is as follows:

Neud Mai, neud erfai / adarfeirdd traeth, (S)
Neud manwyrdd coedydd, / wŷdd weyddiaeth, (S)
Neud meinwedn gan edn / ganiadaeth––anawdd, (S)
Neud mi a'i heurawdd, / neud mau hiraeth. (C)

("It is May, truly the bird-poets of the shore are splendid,
the woods are a fine green, a weaving of trees,
piercing and complex is the intricate song of a bird,
truly it is I who made it famous, truly mine is the longing.")

In the above verse, in addition to the obligatory end-rhymes (-aeth and -awdd, with cross-rhyming in the second couplet), the poet has ornamented each line with cynghanedd sain (S), which combines internal rhyme and consonance. Thus the first line has -ai dérf / -ai dárf; the second line has -ydd w(ýdd) / -ydd w(éydd); the third line has -edn ganéd / -edn ganiád.

The fourth line contains a full cynghanedd groes (C), in which all the consonants of the first half-line (excepting the last one) are repeated in the second half and are arranged in the same way around the stressed vowel. But in addition, the gair cyrch and 4th line together make an extended cynghanedd sain with alternating rhyme and consonance -awdd neudmeaihéur / -awdd neudmauhír.

Each line has a caesura or break after the fifth syllable. There is also cymeriad cynganeddol in that all the lines in the stanza begin with Neud m- (stress).

=== An example from William Llŷn ===
Occasionally an additional rhyme is introduced in the third line of a stanza, with the word before the caesura in line 3 rhyming with the gair cyrch as well as with the word before the caesura in line 4, making a triple rhyme. The following example is by William Llŷn (16th century):

Aur glan ag arian / yma gerir, (S)
Ag o wan allu / a gynullir; (C)
A da'r byd / i gyd / a gedwir––dros bryd, (S)
A da'r hyd / i gyd / yma gedir. (S)

("Pure gold and silver are loved here,
And are gathered by those of weak power;
All the world's wealth is kept––for a time,
But in the end, it is all left behind here.")

The cynghanedd used here is (S) = cyghanedd sain, (C) = cynghanedd groes. The cymeriad llythrennol is "A" at the beginning of each line.

== Gwawdodyn hir ==
This metre, which is less common, is made by adding another couplet of cyhydedd naw ban in front of a gwawdodyn byr to make a stanza of 6 lines. An example of this metre is found in the 18th-century poet Goronwy Owen's ode Marwnad John Owen ("Elegy for John Owen"), a work demonstrating the use of all of the 24 Traditional Welsh poetic metres.

Chychwi y gweiniaid, / och eich geni! (C)
A marw 'ch triniwr, / mawr yw 'ch trueni. (C)
Pwy rydd luniaeth, / pa rodd yleni (C)
Yn ail i Sion, / iawn eluseni? (C)
Oer bod achos / i'r byd ochi;––nis daw (C)
Er gofidiaw / awr i gyfodi. (C)

("You poor people, alas that you were born!
And your provider dead, great is your sorrow.
Who will give sustenance, what gift this year
Second to Sion, true charity?
Cold that the world has cause to groan; there comes not
For all the grieving an hour to rise again.")

Contrary to the style of Dafydd ap Owen and William Llŷn, Goronwy Owen here uses cynghanedd groes (C) in every line. This is expected, since after the 14th century, cynghanedd sain became less common, and cynghanedd groes more common. As with the previous examples, the last line and a half, taken together, make an extended cynghanedd sain. The caesura is sometimes after the 4th syllable, sometimes after the 5th.

According to John Morris-Jones, this longer form of the metre was very rarely used in the 14th century, but became more common in the 15th and 16th.

== Bibliography ==
- Crawford, T. D. (1990). "The Toddaid and Gwawdodyn byr in the poetry of Dafydd ap Gwilym, with an Appendix concerning the Traethodlau attributed to him". Études Celtiques. 27: 301–336. doi:10.3406/ecelt.1990.1935.
- Morris-Jones, John (1925). Cerdd Dafod. Oxford. (In Welsh)
- Parry, Thomas (1961). "The Welsh metrical treatise attributed to Einion Offeriad". (British Academy documents)
- Turco, Lewis (1986). The new book of forms: a handbook of poetics. Hanover: University Press of New England. ISBN 978-0-87451-380-6.
