= Traditional Welsh poetic metres =

24 traditional metres used in Welsh-language poetry

The traditional Welsh poetic metres consist of 24 types of metre, called Y Pedwar Mesur ar Hugain in Welsh. They are all written in cynghanedd of varying degrees of complexity. The classification is often attributed to the early 14th-century poet and grammarian Einion Offeiriad. It has been suggested that Einion may have chosen the number 24, since it conforms to the number of letters in the Welsh alphabet. To achieve this number he divided some metres (such as englyn proest) into different types, and is said to have added some new metres of his own. Einion grouped the metres into three different types: englyn (short stanza), cywydd (longer poem in rhyming couplets), and awdl (more complex metres used in odes). In his original classification, there were 12 englynion and cywyddau, and 12 awdlau, also symbolic numbers.

Later in the 14th century, Dafydd Ddu o Hiraddug, edited Einion's list and made minor changes. He joined englyn proest dalgron and englyn lleddf-broest under one heading called englyn proest cyfnewidiog and added rhupunt hir to rhupunt. It was this new list that Dafydd Nanmor used in the 15th century in his ode for Dafydd ap Tomas ap Dafydd demonstrating the use of all the 24 metres.

In the 15th century at the Carmarthen Eisteddfod of 1451 the list of metres was modified by Dafydd ab Edmwnd. He omitted two of the older forms, namely the thee-line englyn milwr and englyn penfyr, and added two new ones, gorchest y beirdd and cadwynfyr. Only a few of the metres were widely used by the professional poets (Beirdd yr Uchelwyr), and the use of some of the more complicated ones is confined to occasional poems of technical virtuosity dating to the end of the Middle Ages. In fact, John Morris-Jones showed that only 12 of the metres were used by the Gogynfeirdd (12th and 13th-century poets) and that the rest were added to the list by "clever and somewhat arrogant manipulation of recognized metres".

The current rules for submission of a poem for the Bardic Chair competition at the National Eisteddfod are that it should consist of an ode or collection of poems in strict cynghanedd, in more than one of the traditional measures, up to 250 lines. In recent competitions the most commonly used metres for odes have been cywydd deuair hirion and englyn unodl union. Two other metres, gwawdodyn, and toddaid, are commonly used to transition between sections.

== The 24 metres ==
The twenty-four Welsh poetic metres according to current bardic rules and as prescribed by Dafydd ap Edmwnd in 1451 are as follows:

Englyn:

- Englyn unodl union
- Englyn unodl crwca
- Englyn cyrch
- Englyn proest cyfnewidiog
- Englyn proest cadwynog

Cywydd:

- Awdl gywydd
- Cywydd deuair hirion
- Cywydd deuair fyrion
- Cywydd llosgyrnog

Awdl:

- Rhupunt byr
- Rhupunt hir
- Cyhydedd fer
- Byr-a-thoddaid
- Clogyrnach
- Cyhydedd naw ban
- Cyhydedd hir
- Toddaid
- Gwawdodyn byr
- Gwawdodyn hir
- Hir-a-thoddaid
- Cyrch-a-chwta
- Tawddgyrch cadwynog
- Gorchest y beirdd
- Cadwynfyr

The original 24 metres specified by Einion Offeiriad and described in John Morris-Jones (1925) Cerdd Dafod, pp. 319–348, differ slightly from these. Einion's version includes the three-line englyn penfyr and englyn milwr; it divides the englyn proest cyfnewidiog into two different types, named englyn proest dalgron (using simple vowels) and englyn proest leddf (using long diphthongs); it omits cadwynfyr and gorchest y beirdd; and combines rhupunt hir and rhupunt byr into one category.

Despite being more or less an exact contemporary of Dafydd ab Edmwnd (c. 1450–90), Dafydd Nanmor did not include Dafydd ab Edmwnd's two new metres in his ode written for his patron Dafydd ap Tomas ap Dafydd demonstrating the 24 metres, but instead used the englyn penfyr and englyn milwr from Einion's original list.

== Sources ==
The oldest copy of the book usually referred to as Gramadeg Einion Offeriad (anonymous, but thought to be by Einion) is preserved in the Red Book of Hergest, written in the late fourteenth century. A slightly later copy is found in Llanstephan MS. 3. Two later incomplete copies occur in Bangor MS. 1 and Peniarth MS. 20, both of which were probably written in the early part of the fifteenth century. All of these are slightly different, and appear to be revisions of the original work.

Other versions of the twenty-four Welsh metres found in manuscript sources dating to the 16th century include:

- Peniarth MS 56 (Traethawd y Felin, & c.) – Doesn't include the Dafydd ab Edmwnd metres (cadwynfyr and gorchest y beirdd).
- NLW MS 17116B (Latin homilies and Welsh material relating to heraldry, poetry and music) – Includes all the Edmwnd metres and the ofer-fesurau ("false measures", referring to metres such as englyn cildwrn, trybedd menaich, englyn pendrwm, englyn milwr, old measures from the Red Book of Hergest and perhaps a few others).
- Peniarth MS 155 (Llyfr Richard Phylip o Picton) – Doesn't include the ofer-fesurau.
- Peniarth MS 147 (Cantrefi a chymydau Cymru, &c.) – The ofer-fesurau are included.
- Peniarth MS 77 (Barddoniaeth Lewis Glyn Cothi) – Doesn't include the Edmwnd metres or the ofer-fesurau.
- BL Add. 14875 – Includes the Edmwnd metres but not the ofer-fesurau.
- Llanstephan MS 55 (Poetry, vocabulary, Dafydd Ddu's Grammar, &c.) – Doesn't include the Edmwnd metres.

== Englyn metres ==
=== Englyn unodl union ===
Englyn unodl union (Welsh pronunciation: ['ɛŋlɨn 'ɨnɔdl 'injɔn]) is "by far the most popular" type of englyn. It is a four-line stanza consisting of a combination of one toddaid byr couplet and one cywydd deuair hirion couplet. The lines are therefore of 10, 6, 7 and 7 syllables; there is usually a caesura after the 5th syllable of line 1.

All four lines have the same rhyme, but the rhyme in line 1 comes before the end of the line, and is followed by an extra word or words called the gair cyrch, which can be one, two, or three syllables long. The gair cyrch is linked to a word in line 2 by consonance or by rhyme. Usually a dash is written between the rhyming word and the gair cyrch.

The first two lines of an englyn unodl union are known as the paladr ("shaft (of an arrow)") and the 3rd and 4th line are known as the esgyll ("feathers" or "fins").

The following englyn is a riddle by Dafydd ap Gwilym (14th century):

Doe gwelais / cyd â gwialen––o gorn, (T)
Ag arno / naw cangen; (Cy)
Gŵr balch / ag og ar ei ben, (C)
A gwraig foel / o'r graig felen. (C)

Yesterday I saw coupling with a rod of horn
And on it nine branches;
A proud husband with a harrow on his head
And a bald wife from the yellow rock.

Each line is decorated with consonantal cynghanedd: (T) = cynghanedd draws, (Cy) = cynghanedd gyrch (linking the end of line 1 with the beginning or middle of line 2), (C) = cynghanedd groes.

The following is a well-known englyn by Tudur Aled (15th-16th century):

Mae'n wir / y gwelir / argoelyn––difai (S)
Wrth dyfaid / y brigyn; (Cy)
Hysbys / y dengys / y dyn (S)
O ba radd / y bo'i wreiddyn. (C)

("It is true that a faultless sign is seen
By the growth of the twig;
Clearly it is that a person shows
From what grade his rootstock is.")

In the following example, the poet William Phylip (17th century) bids farewell to his home, Hendre Fechan in Merionethshire, which he was forced to flee because of his support for King Charles I:

Yn iach, / gyfrinach / y gân––wych iawndrefn, (S)
Yn iach, Hendre Fechan; (Cy)
A'r llyfrau cerdd, / loywgerdd / lân, (S)
I chwithau, / yn iach weithian (C)

("Farewell, secret of song––splendid, perfect order,
Farewell, Hendre Fechan;
And the books of poetry, pure and shining song,
To you also, farewell henceforth.")

In a toddaid couplet like the first couplet of this poem, the gair cyrch can be linked to the middle of the next line either by rhyme or by consonance, but in an englyn unodl union consonance is much more common. In the 51 englynion from the 14th to 20th century printed in The Oxford Book of Welsh Verse (pp. 268–72, 528–36), every single one has consonantal cynghanedd gyrch rather than rhyme. However, rhyme is occasionally found, as in the following by Dafydd ap Gwilym, where Ffwg rhymes with Morgannwg:

O wychder, / fy nêr / un arial––â Ffwg, (S)
Morgannwg / mawr gynnal, (C)
Ofer dyn, / fwriad anial, (C)
Ofer deg / wrth Ifor dal. (T)

("In splendour, my lord of the same spirit as Fulk,
Glamorgan's great support,
any man is worthless, marvellous intent,
ten are worthless compared to tall Ifor.")

=== Englyn unodl crwca ===
The Englyn unodl crwca ("Crooked single-rhymed stanza") is similar to the englyn unodl union except that the order is reversed. The first two lines are a couplet in the cywydd deuair hirion metre and the 3rd and 4th lines are a toddaid byr. Thus the lines are of 7 + 7 + 10 + 6 syllables.

This type of englyn is hardly ever used. The following example is part of an ode composed by Goronwy Owen (18th century) to demonstrate all the 24 metres:

Mawr gwynaw / y mae 'r gweinion (C)
"Gwae oll y sut / golli Sion"; (C)
Ni bu rwyddach / neb o'i roddion––diwg, (C)
Diledwg / i dlodion. (C)

("Greatly do the weak lament
'Woe to all such loss of Sion';
There was no one freer with his gifts, cheerful,
Kind to the poor.")

Every line of the stanza is ornamented with cynghanedd groes. Instead of consonantal cynghanedd, as is usual in the englyn unodl union, the gair cyrch (diwg) is linked to the following word by rhyme, as in the gwawdodyn metre, thus making an extended cynghanedd sain covering the last line and a half.

=== Englyn cyrch ===
Englyn cyrch is a stanza consisting of four 7-syllable lines, made up from a cywydd deuair hirion couplet, followed by an awdl-gywydd couplet. Lines one, two, and four rhyme, but line 3 rhymes with the word before the caesura in line 4.

The following example is by Dafydd Nanmor (15th century):

Deng mil o filioedd / oeddyn', (L)
Draw dri llu / hyd ar dir Llŷn; (C)
Dilýnaist / hwynt dal-ýn-nal (T)
Dair ystál, / nid arhoes dyn. (C)

Ten thousand of thousands they were,
Yonder three hosts along the land of Llŷn;
You followed them neck-and-neck
For three stages, not a man stood his ground.

(L) = cynghanedd lusg, (C) = cynghanedd groes, (T) = cynghanedd draws. There is also cymeriad llythrennol, in that all the lines begin with D.

This kind of englyn can also be written with proest ("half-rhyme") in lines 1, 2, and 4 instead of rhyme.

The englyn cyrch is very similar in its rhyme scheme to the popular South Wales verse form the triban. One difference is that the triban has eight syllables in the third line of the stanza, with four accents in that line.

=== Englyn proest cyfnewidiog ===
Englyn proest cyfnewidiog ("the alternating half-rhyme englyn") is also called englyn proest gyfnewidiog since the word proest can be masculine or feminine.

An englyn proest cyfnewidiog usually has four lines, each line 7 syllables long. Instead of rhyme (odl), the four lines use proest (half-rhyme); that is, each line ends in the same consonant or consonants but uses a different vowel. The vowels in the rhymes must be either all short or all long, but not a mixture.

Einion Offeiriad divided this type of englyn into two subtypes, namely englyn proest dalgron (using simple vowels) and englyn lleddfbroest (using long diphthongs).

Dafydd ap Gwilym included three stanzas of this metre in his poem Marwnad Llywelyn ap Gwilym ("Elegy for Llywelyn ap Gwilym", Dafydd's uncle, who was apparently murdered). The remaining 32 stanzas of the poem are englyn unodl union. The first of the proest stanzas is as follows:

Gwae fi weled, / trwydded / drwg, (S)
Neuaddau milwr, / tŵr / teg, (S)
Annawn oes, / un yn ysig, (C)
A'r llall, / do gwall, / yn dŷ gwag. (S)

("Woe is me to see (cruel privilege!)
The halls of a soldier, a fair tower,
(calamity of the age!) one (hall) shattered,
and the other, with broken roof, an empty house.")

(S) here = cynghanedd sain and (C) = cynghanedd groes. The rhymes can be stressed or unstressed at will.

Another example of this metre comes from a poem by Tudur Aled (16th century). Apart from this one stanza, the rest of the poem is composed in the metres englyn unodl union and cywydd llosgyrnog:

Oes dâl i'm hoes / o dalm hwnt? (C)
Oes iso goed / Siese gynt? (C)
Oes, o'r un blaid / swrn o blant (C)
O Siân, / arglwyddes o Went. (T)

Is there anything left for my age from that time?
Is there, beneath the tree of Jesse of old?
There is, from the same party an abundance of children,
From Jane, the Lady of Gwent.

(C) here = cynghanedd groes and (T) = cynghanedd draws.

Occasionally a stanza in this metre has six lines, as in poems 8 and 43 of Guto'r Glyn.

=== Englyn proest cadwynog ===
In englyn proest cadwynog ("chained half-rhyme englyn") there are four lines, each seven syllables long. The rhyme scheme is A B A B; but the two rhymes must half-rhyme with each other according to the rules of proest.

The following example is by Goronwy Owen (18th century). All four lines have cynghanedd sain (S):

Ymddifad / ei thad, / a thwn (S)
Archoll / yn ei friwdoll / fron, (S)
Yng nghur / digysur, / da gwn, (S)
Yn gaeth / o'm hiraeth / am hon (S)

("Orphaned of her father, and a broken
gash in her wounded breast,
In comfortless anguish, well I know,
Being captive to my longing for her.")

The long diphthongs ⟨ŵy, ae, oe, ei⟩, which are considered lleddf "languid", do not rhyme with simple vowels, but must be used together. The following example is by Lewis Glyn Cothi (15th century):

At ryw y rhain / trwy yr hŵyr (C)
Y trof / (cadwed Duw yr aer!) (T)
Troi i'r gwin / a'r tri rhyw gŵyr, (C)
Troi ar gylch / i'r tŵr a'r gaer. (C)

("To the nature of these, through the evening,
I will turn (may God protect the heir!);
turning to the wine and the three kinds of wax,
turning in a circle to the tower and the fortress.")

== Cywydd metres ==
A cywydd, except for the cywydd llosgyrnog, is a long poem made of rhyming couplets.

=== Awdl-gywydd ===
Awdl-gywydd is a type of cywydd that was originally popular amongst minstrel poets, before being adopted by professional poets in the fifteenth century. Among these was Dafydd ab Edmwnd, who decided that regular cynghanedd must be used in it. The metre, without cynghanedd added to it, continued to be used in cwndidau (literally, "condut"; a religious song or carol) and harp stanzas. It was rare for it to be used on its own and therefore was commonly incorporated into the metrical forms englyn cyrch and cyrch-a-chwta. Sometimes, awdl-gywydd is used to refer to just two lines of the normal quatrain, especially when incorporated into other forms.

An awdl-gywydd is very similar to a cywydd deuair hirion in that it has lines of seven syllables formed into couplets. The rhyme scheme, however, is different in that the final syllable of the first line of each couplet must rhyme with the syllable before the caesura of the second line, and the final syllable of the second line of a couplet must rhyme with the final syllable of all the couplets throughout the poem. An example of a single couplet is as follows:

Cynnes / ydyw'r fynwes / fau (S)
Can fwydau / cynefodig (C)

("My heart is warm
with traditional foods")

The main rhyme -ig is repeated at the end of every couplet throughout the poem. Cynghanedd is used just as in a cywydd deuair hirion. Here (S) = cynghanedd sain, (C) = cynghanedd groes. The second line of a couplet always has cynghanedd groes or cynghanedd draws, but the first line may have any type. Because of this consonantal cynghanedd in the last line, the ending of the first line when combined with the last line make an extended cynghanedd sain in each couplet.

The awdl-gywydd is so called because it has continuous rhyme (odl) throughout the poem like an awdl, but it is composed of couplets like a cywydd.

=== Cywydd deuair hirion ===
Cywydd deuair hirion ("cywydd of long couplets") is the most frequently used type of cywydd, and in fact, it is common for a poem in this metre to just be referred to simply as a cywydd. Popularised by Dafydd ap Gwilym in the 14th century, it became so commonly used that the period from 1330 to 1640 is sometimes known as the cyfnod y cywyddau ("period of the cywydds"). This period also coincided with the introduction of strict rules for alliteration and rhyme, known as cynghanedd gaeth ("rigorous or strict harmony").

This metre was used for various purposes: praise poems, elegies, narratives, descriptions of the seasons or of nature, requests for a present or thanks for one, and love poems.

A poem in the metre is composed of rhyming couplets, which may be of any number. Each couplet is made of lines 7 syllables long. In any couplet, one line (either the first or the second) must end in a stressed syllable, and the other in an unstressed one. Every line uses cynghanedd (with some exceptions in the 14th century), which is mainly of four different types: croes, traws, sain or llusg. Of these, cynghanedd lusg is the least common, and is only used in the first line of a couplet. There is usually a caesura in the middle of the line, mostly after the third syllable, but sometimes after the second or fourth, dividing it into two parts. When cynghanedd sain is used, the line is divided into three parts.

An example is the following couplet from a love poem in which Dafydd ap Gwilym addresses a seagull:

Dilwch / yw dy degwch / di (S)
Darn fal haul / dyrnfol heli (C)

("Immaculate is your beauty
Like a piece of sun, a gauntlet of sea")

In the above example, the first line has cynghanedd sain, with two internal rhymes interleaved with alliteration (-wch d- -wch -d). The second line has cynghanedd groes, with the consonants {D R N F L H (stress) L} found in that order in both halves.

The following couplet, from Tudur Aled (15th/16th century) describing a horse, has cynghanedd lusg (L) in the first line, which involves internal rhyme with a penultimate syllable, and cynghanedd draws (T) in the second, with echoed consonants {L N C (stress)} in both halves of the line:

I arial / a ddyfalwn (L)
I elain coch / ym mlaen cŵn. (T)

("His spirit I would compare
to a red hind in front of dogs.")

The following couplet, by Edmwnd Prys (16th/17th century), again has cynghanedd lusg in line 1 but paired with cynghanedd sain in line 2:

Amlwg fydd trwyn / ar wyneb (L)
Rhaid i ni / nodi / neb (S)

("Obvious is a nose on a face;
there is no need for us to mention anyone.")

=== Cywydd deuair fyrion ===
Cywydd deuair fyrion ("short couplet cywydd") is a type of cywydd that is rarely used. A cywydd deuair fyrion has lines four syllables long, formed into rhyming couplets. These can be written one above the other or with both halves of the couplet on the same line of text. It sometimes has cynghanedd and sometimes not. For example, without cynghanedd:

Ei thegwch / hi // bu'n saeth / imi.

("Her beauty was an arrow for me")

In the following by John Morris-Jones, there is some alliteration, but not full cynghanedd in every line:

Ond Ef, / mad oedd.
Oediog / ydoedd,
Di lid / ei law,
Hir cyn / taraw.

("But He was good;
He was patient.
His hand was without anger
long before striking.")

A poem in this metre can consist of any number of couplets. In each line there are two accents, making 4 accents in the whole couplet.

=== Cywydd llosgyrnog ===
Cywydd llosgyrnog is another type of cywydd that is rarely used. The basic stanza has three lines, but it is usually used in pairs. The rules for cywydd llosgyrnog are that it has lines of 8, 8, 7, 8, 8, 7 syllables. Lines one and two rhyme and cross rhyme with the 3rd syllable of line three, and lines four and five rhyme and cross rhyme with the 3rd syllable of line six. Lines three and six rhyme with each other.

An example is the following by Dafydd ab Edmwnd (15th century). (C) = cynghanedd groes, (T) = cynghanedd draws.

Y mae goroff / em a garaf (C)
O gof aelaw / ag a folaf (C)
O choeliaf / gael i chalon; (T)
Am na welais / i myn Elien (C)
O Lanurful / i lyn Aerfen (C)
Wawr mor wen / o’r morynion (C)

("There is a beloved gem that I love.
Of a rich memory and whom I shall praise,
If I trust to win her heart;
For I have not seen, by Saint Elen,
From Llanerfyl to the waters of Aerfen (the River Dee),
A dawn so bright among maidens.")

Llosgyrnog means "tailed", since the third line of the stanza is considered to be like a tail. John Morris-Jones conjectured that this metre might have been imitated from a Latin hymn form.

== Awdl metres ==
An awdl originally was a poem using the same rhyme (odl) for a number of verses or even the whole poem. Sometimes more than one metre was used in a poem. Today it is defined as a long poem displaying at least two of the traditional metres, with cynghanedd in each line. (The continued rhyme is no longer required.)

=== Rhupunt byr ===
A rhupunt (Welsh pronunciation: ['r̥ɨ̞pɨ̞nt]) is a 12-syllable line divided into three sections each of 4 syllables. The first two sections rhyme together, while the third section rhymes with other lines in the poem. Another form of the name, which was used already in the 15th century, was hupunt.

An example is:

Duw rhy'm rhoddwy, / rheidun arlwy, / erlid cyngor,
Rhodd fodd fedru, / rhif brif brydu, / brydest ragor

("May God grant me, by the provision of the Lord, the pursuit of counsel,
the gift of skill, to reckon foremost verse, an excellent poem.")

In the above example, in addition to consonantal alliteration (rhodd- rheidd-, arl- erl etc.), both lines display a form of cynghanedd sain across the whole line; and in addition line 2 has a shorter cynghanedd sain in each of its first two sections. The alliteration is of the early type known as cynghanedd braidd gyffwrdd.

The metre does not have to be written in couplets but can continue for a number of lines in succession.

In 1451 a further specification was added by Dafydd ab Edmwnd, that if sections 1 and 2 of the line ended in an unaccented syllable, the rhyme in those sections must be a double (two-syllable) one, for example:

Iawn o'i berchi / i bawb erchi, / o bob eirchiad,
Ar y diben / oes anniben / i Siôn Abad.

("Right it is to respect him, for everyone to petition, of every petitioner;
For this end there is no end for Abbot John.")

As with the previous example, each line as a whole is an example of cynghanedd sain, with internal rhyme in parts 1 and 2, and cynghanedd groes alliteration between sections 2 and 3.

The 18th-century poet Goronwy Owen preferred to write this metre with the sections as separate lines. The following is from his Marwnad John Owen ("Elegy for John Owen"), a poem demonstrating all 24 of the traditional metres:

Os tra pherchid,
O mawr eurid,
Am arwredd;
Deufwy cerid,
Mwy yr enwid,
Am ei rinwedd.

("As much as he was revered,
(O great majesty!)
For (his) heroism,
Twice as much he was loved,
The more he was named,
For his virtue.")

Although written as separate lines, the three sections of lines 1–3 together make a single cynghanedd sain, with alternating internal rhyme and consonance: -id, mawréur, -id, marẃr, and the same with lines 4–6. The rule about double rhymes is not observed.

=== Rhupunt hir ===
Rhupunt hir ("long rhupunt") is a rhupunt with an additional 4-syllable section, thus it is made of couplets of 16 syllables, with each line divided 4 + 4 + 4 + 4. Sections 1, 2, and 3 of the first line of a couplet rhyme with each other and also often with the same sections in the second line. The name rhupunt hir can also be used to refer to a couplet in this form.

The example below is by Dafydd Nanmor (15th century):

Un oes a wnair, / a dwy neu dair (C + C)
i'r iarll a gair, / er lliw a gwedd; (C)
A'r groes oedd grair i Dduw ddiwair (T + C)
a bair Gwyry Fair / a'r Gŵr a fedd. (~C)

("One life is made, and two or three
are obtained for the earl, despite his colour and appearance;
And the cross was a relic to the faithful God,
whom the Virgin Mary creates, and the Lord who rules.")

The first two sections of each line each have their separate cynghanedd, while the third and fourth together have a single cynghanedd.

=== Cyhydedd fer ===
The form cyhydedd fer (Welsh pronunciation: [kɘ'hɘdɛð 'vɛr]) ("short length verse") consists of rhyming couplets of eight-syllable lines. (Welsh fer (Welsh) is the feminine form of byr ("short").) Generally the same rhyme is used for a number of couplets. The metre exists in two versions, used in earlier and later poetry respectively, the earlier form having three beats to the line, and the later version four beats.

==== Early version ====
The 242-line ode Canu Tysilio ("Song of Tysilio") by the 12th-century poet Cynddelw Brydydd Mawr is written in this metre. This ode was sung c.1156–60 at Meifod under the patronage of Madog ap Maredudd, prince of Powys, in honour of the Saint Tysilio. The poem has nine sections each with its own rhyme; thus the first 52 lines (26 couplets) all have the rhyme -edd. It begins:

Duw dinag, / dinas / tangnefedd, (BG)
Duw, dy nawdd, / na’m cawdd / i’m camwedd, (S)
Duw doeth / i deithi / teÿrnedd, (BG)
Teÿrnas / wenwas / wirionedd; (S)

("Generous God, the stronghold of peace,
God, (grant me) your protection, do not punish me in my wickedness,
God, who came to the patrimony of kings,
the truth of the blessed dwelling of the kingdom (of heaven).")

In this early version of the metre the lines tend to be divided into three sections with three accents per line. In the above example, lines 1 and 3 have cynghanedd braidd gyffwrdd (BG), in which only the words in the middle of the line have alliteration (e.g. dinag dinas). Lines 2 and 4 have cynghanedd sain (S), with internal rhyme and alliteration.

==== Later version ====
In the later version of the metre, the line tends to split into two halves after the fourth syllable, with four accents, as in this poem by Lewis Glyn Cothi (15th century):

Pob rhyw adar / pupuredig (C)
In a nodant / yn enwedig (C)
Sy o fwydau / yn safedig (C)
A gai wawdydd / fai dysgedig (T)

("Every kind of speckled birds
Which they note for us particularly,
Which are sustained from soft foods,
Will receive praise from a learned poet.")

The above example has cynghanedd groes (C) in lines 1, 2, and 3 and cynghanedd draws (T) in line 4. (In line 1, pob rhyw ("every kind") is pronounced pop rhyw, because of the h, thus matching the consonants of pupuredig ("peppery").)

The 18th-century revivalist poet Goronwy Owen included a verse in this metre in his Elegy for John Owen. He has decorated each line of the stanza with cynghandedd groes (C):

Cu hil hynaws! / cael o honynt, (C)
Duw 'n dedwyddwch, / Di 'n Dad iddynt; (C)
Yn ymddifad / na 'moddefynt (C)
Gyrchau trawster; / gwarchod trostynt. (C)

"Dear, kind offspring! May they receive
God as their happiness, You as a Father to them;
As orphans may they not suffer
the assaults of oppression; watch over them."

Because of its different caesura and accentuation, this later version of the metre is really a separate metre from the older one, despite the fact that the line-length and rhyme-scheme are the same. The later version resembles the cywydd deuair fyrion in its rhythm, but differs in its rhyme scheme.

=== Byr-a-thoddaid ===
The metre byr-a-thoddaid ("short and toddaid") consists of any mixture of cyhydedd fer couplets consisting of 8 syllables per line and toddaid byr couplets consisting of 10 syllables + 6 syllables. (A toddaid is a couplet with cross-rhyming or cynghanedd gyrch, similar to the first two lines of an englyn unodl union described above.) There can be various arrangements of these two types of couplet, the only rule being that two toddaid couplets may not come together.

Einion Offeiriad gives the following example, which is the beginning of a longer poem:

Y Gwr a'm rhoddes / rhinieu––ar dafawd, /
ag arawd / a geirieu,
A'm troses / i gyffes / nid geu,
A'm troso / i'r toseb / goreu,
I guriaw / gorwisg / fy ngruddieu
I garu / Mab Duw / diameu,
I gymryd penyd / rhag poeneu––uffern /
Ag affeith / bechodeu.

("May the Lord who gave me gifts upon the tongue,
and eloquence and words,
turn me to confession which is not false,
and turn me to the best pursuit,
to beat the covering of my cheeks,
to love the Son of God without doubt,
to take penance against the pains of Hell
and the corruption of sins.")

The example above begins and ends with a toddaid byr. In the first toddaid the two lines of the couplet are linked by rhyme (-awd -awd), and in the second they are linked by consonance (uff- aff-). In effect the whole part from ar dafawd to a geirieu is a long cynghanedd sain. Line 3 also has cynghanedd sain.

The cyhydedd fer couplets in Einion's example are of the older style where the lines are divided into three parts, with three accents rather than four. The same rhyme (-eu) is used in every line.

A later example of bir-a-thoddaid is the following, by the 18th-century poet Goronwy Owen from his Elegy for John Owen. Here the cyhydedd fer lines show the later style with four accents to the line:

Ar hyd ei fywyd_/_o'i fodd,––iawn haelwas, (CoG)
Yn helaeth / y rhannodd; (Cy)
A'i Dduw eilwaith / a addolodd; (C)
Wiw baun dethol, / a'i bendithiodd. (C)
Diwall oedd / a da y llwyddodd; (C)
Am elw ciried / mil a'i carodd; (C)
Hap llesol, / pwy a'i llysodd?––Duw un—tri, (C)
Ei Geli / a'i galwodd. (C)

("Throughout his life willingly, a truly generous servant,
Abundantly he shared;
And his God in turn he worshipped;
A choice, worthy peacock! and He blessed him.
Faultless he was, and well did he prosper;
For his blessed benefit, a thousand loved him;
A fortunate success, who could reject it? God, the One-in-Three,
His Lord it is who called him.")

The first line, as far as the dash, has cynghanedd groes o gyswllt (CoG), in which the last consonant of the first half-line is "borrowed" to complete the consonantal pattern in the second half-line. As with the previous example, the first toddaid links the gair cyrch to the next line by cynghanedd gyrch (Cy), while the second toddaid (lines 7–8) uses rhyme. The other lines are all ornamented with cynghanedd groes (C)

=== Clogyrnach ===
Clogyrnach is a metre that consists of a rhyming couplet of cyhydedd fer (8 syllables + 8 syllables), followed by a traeanog, which is a couplet of 10 syllables + 6, with three internal rhymes. The whole stanza therefore has lines of 8, 8, 10, 6 syllables. In a clogyrnach stanza, lines 1, 2, and 4 rhyme together with the main rhyme, which is repeated in later stanzas, and a secondary rhyme links the middle of line 3, the end of line 3, and the middle of line 4. This secondary rhyme changes in each stanza.

The early style of the cyhydedd fer metre differs from the later style. In the earlier style the line is broken into three, with three accents, while in the later style it is broken into two, with four accents. An example of the earlier style is the following stanza by Gwalchmai ap Meilyr (12th century):

A chymradw / a hirgadw / hirgwyn,
A hirgur / o ddolur / 'i ddwyn;
Ac i Dduw o'i ddawn / ydd archaf arch iawn,
Awdl ffrwythlawn, / ffrwyth gymwyn.

("And frail and long-kept long-grief,
and a long-pining of sorrow to bear;
And to God from His grace I ask a righteous request,
A fruitful ode, a pleasant fruit.")

In the above example, lines 1 and 2 each make a cynghanedd sain (combining internal rhyme in parts 1 and 2 with alliteration in parts 2 and 3), while lines 3 and 4 taken as a whole make cynghanedd sain teirodl (i.e. cynghanedd sain with three internal rhymes).

An example of the later style is a series of ten stanzas in this metre (lines 45–84) included in Guto'r Glyn's poem Awdl foliant i’r Abad Dafydd ab Ieuan o Lyn-y-groes ("Ode of Praise for Abbot Dafydd son of Ieuan from Lyn-y-Groes"), dating to the 15th century. One of the stanzas reads as follows:

Derw yw’r adail, / doir i’w rodio, (C)
Deled Wynedd, / daw Iâl dano. (C)
Dwyfil, o dyfydd, / difalch yw Dafydd, (C)
Dinegydd, / dawn Iago. (C)

("The building is of oak, they come to wander around it,
may Gwynedd come, Yale will come under his authority.
Should two thousand come, Dafydd will not be haughty,
he refuses no one, he of St James’s blessing.")

In this example, every line has cynghanedd groes (C). The cymeriad llythrennol (the letter D at the beginning of each line) continues throughout the 40 lines of the passage, as does the main rhyme in -o.

The reason for the name clogyrnach is unknown. It is evidently connected with clogwrn ("cliff, rock"). William Richards (see below) translated it as "rugosity" (i.e. rockiness, roughness).

=== Cyhydedd naw ban ===
Cyhydedd naw ban ("nine-part length") is a 9-syllable line that must rhyme with at least one other 9-syllable line to form at least a couplet. In each line there is a caesura after the 5th syllable. The metre is an old one: for example, part of no. 5 (7th century) in The Oxford Book of Welsh Verse is in this metre, as is the whole of no. 7 (9th century), in praise of Tenby, which begins:

Archaf wên i Dduw, / plwyf esgori,
Perchen nef a llawr, / pwyllfawr wofri.

("I pray for the blessing of God for the people's deliverance,
Owner of heaven and earth, of great wisdom.")

A good example of this metre is the Marwnad Gruffudd ap Cynan ("Elegy for Gruffudd ap Cynan") by the 12th-century poet Meilyr Brydydd ap Mabon, written about A.D. 1137. This has 172 lines all in the same metre, using just four different rhymes (-awd, -awc, -ydd, -ed). Part of it (in modern spelling) reads:

Gruffudd grym wriawr / o'i wawr fenydd,
ni'm didoles nu / ni bu gelwydd,
yni fwyf gynefin / a derwin wydd,
ni thorraf a'm car / fy ngharenhydd.

("Gruffudd, warrior's might, from his great youth,
did not part from me, it was no falsehood;
until I am more familiar with the oak wood,
I will not break with my friend, my kinsman.")

The above poem also contains internal rhymes in each line (underlined above), linking the syllable before the caesura with another syllable one or two syllables later in the line. The fourth line has cynghanedd lusg with a rhyme linked to the antepenultimate syllable, which was not uncommon in this period.

However, this internal rhyming is not an essential part of the metre. Later writers, such as Dafydd Nanmor (15th century), in conformity with later practice, wrote the metre with consonantal cynghanedd rather than rhyme:

Un dwrf â llew / yn d'arfan lliwiog (C)
Yn tarfu gwerin / mewn tref gaerog (C)

("A noise like a lion in your colourful shouting
Disturbing the people in a fortified town.")

The above couplet has cynghanedd groes (C) in both lines and no rhyme except at the end. The first line also differs from the previous examples in that the caesura comes after the 4th foot.

When one couplet, or two couplets, of cyhydedd naw ban is followed by a toddaid hir of 10 syllables + 9, it makes the metre gwawdodyn (see below).

=== Cyhydedd hir ===
The metre cyhydedd hir ("long-length verse") (Welsh pronunciation: [kɘ'hɘdɛð 'hir]) consists of a couplet in which each line has 19 syllables, divided 5 + 5 + 5 + 4. The first three sections of each line rhyme together and the last section rhymes with the second line of the couplet. Usually each line is written as two separate half-lines. The following example comes from Dafydd Benfras (13th century), praising Llywelyn ap Gruffudd, prince of Gwynedd:

Mwyfwy 'i gythrudd, / mireinfab Gruffudd, /
Mae yn i ddeurudd / ddawn ni chilia
Cymen Lywelyn, / cymyrth 'i derfyn, /
Cymru o gylchyn / a gylchyna

("More and more is his passion, the splendid son of Gruffudd;
in his two cheeks there is a talent that will not recede.
Wise Llywelyn seized his borders,
all around Wales, he encompasses it.")

The above example has alliteration (e.g. cym- ... cym- in line 3) but the alliteration does not follow the same rules as the cynghanedd customary in the 14th century onwards. Each 19-syllable line, taken as a whole, however, is an example of cynghanedd sain deirodl, i.e. cynghanedd sain with three rhymes.

The second half of Tudur Aled's Elegy for Siân Stradling is written in this metre. (Jane Stradling, wife of Sir William Griffith of Penrhyn near Bangor, died about 1520.) This part of the poem consists of ten 19-syllable couplets, followed by a stanza of three 19-syllable lines in the same metre. One of the couplets (printed as six lines) is as follows:

Parcau, tyrau teg, (S)
Plaid o ddugiaid, ddeg, (S)
Pibau yn rhedeg, / pob anrhydedd; (C)
Aur a myrr_/_a main, (CoG)
A gwiw rhwysg_/_y rhain, (CoG)
Gwedi, im arwain / gyda mawredd. (C)

"Parks, fair towers,
A party of dukes, ten,
Pipes running, every honour;
Gold and myrrh and precious stones,
And the worthy pomp of these,
Afterwards, to lead me with majesty.")

(S) = cynghanedd sain, (C) = cynghanedd groes, (CoG) = cynghanedd groes o gyswllt, a type of cynghanedd in which a consonant is borrowed from the first half of a line to complete the matching consonant pattern in the second half. Here the two patterns are {R M (stress)} and {G Rh (stress)}.

=== Toddaid ===
The toddaid metre is very like the cyhydedd hir described above in that it is made of sections of 5 + 5 + 5 + 4 syllables arranged in two lines; however, the rhyme scheme is different. In the toddaid a new rhyme is introduced one, two, or three syllables before the end of line 1; this syllable has the main rhyme, which matches the end of the second line and continues in other lines in the poem. The syllable at the end of line 1 rhymes with the syllable at the midpoint of line 2. Usually the last portion of line 1, known as the gair cyrch, is separated from it by a dash; but this dash is just a metrical mark and doesn't necessarily represent a break in sense.

To make the toddaid metre, two 19-syllable toddaids are joined together to make a stanza, as in the example below by Dafydd ap Gwilym (14th century):

Hardd eisyllydd rhydd / (rhodd ddidor––meddlyn!) (S)
Helmwyn Lywelyn, / wawl gychwior. (S)
Heddiw nid ydiw / didwyll iôr––gwyndal (S)
Hafal hael ddyfal, / hylwydd Ifor. (S)

("Fair generous offspring (a ceaseless gift of mead!)
of white-helmeted Llywelyn, shining kinsman.
Today there is not an honest white-foreheaded lord
Like constantly generous, prosperous Ifor.")

Here, in addition to the rhymes mentioned above, there are also the additional internal rhymes and alliteration of cynghanedd sain (S) in every line. There is also cymeriad llythrennol, since each line begins with the letter ⟨H⟩.

The above stanza is from Dafydd's Awdl i Ifor Hael (an ode to his patron Ifor ap Llywelyn). This poem consists of four englyn unodl union stanzas (10 + 6 + 7 + 7 syllables), followed by eight toddaid hir stanzas (10 + 9 + 10 + 9 syllables). All 12 stanzas end in the name Ifor, and the rhyme "-or" is used in every line. Dafydd also used the metre in four other poems, always preceded by one or more englyn unodl union stanzas.

The 19-syllable toddaid itself was commonly used in the early period of Welsh poetry, but always mixed with other metres. The first poet to make a stanza out of two toddaid couplets is thought to have been Gwilym Ddu o Arfon in 1322.

Another example of a toddaid stanza is the following from an elegy by Dafydd Nanmor (15th century). It is the first of a series of 10 stanzas of the same kind, all rhyming in -awr. In this stanza, in addition to the usual toddaid cross-rhyme, there is also cynghanedd sain (S) in lines 1 and 3, and cynghanedd groes (C) in lines 2 and 4:

Mab Rhys aeth o'i lys / i lawr––yr Erwig (S)
Mewn gro a cherrig / mae'n garcharawr. (C)
Ban aeth gwroliaeth / ar elawr––o'r llys, (S)
Bu bobl 'i ynys / heb ei blaenawr. (C)

("The son of Rhys went from his court down to Erwig
In gravel and stones he is a prisoner.
When manhood went on a bier from the court,
The people of his island were without their leader.")

A 20th-century poem in this metre is the "Song of the Angels" from Geraint Bowen's ode Awdl Foliant i'r Amaethwr ("In Praise of the Farmer"), which won the bardic chair at the 1946 Eisteddfod. This consists of 11 four-line toddaid stanzas, with an englyn unodl union at the beginning and end. One of the stanzas reads:

Mewn llwch mae harddwch / Ei hedd––di-dristwch, (S)
A chyll ei hagrwch / a'i holl lygredd; (C)
Sawr dwys Baradwys / ar wedd––ac ar gŵys, (S)
Pren Ei grwys ar bwys / llaw a bysedd. (S)

("In dust lies the beauty of His sorrowless peace,
And it will lose its ugliness and all its corruption;
The profound fragrance of Paradise on countenance and on sod,
The wood of His cross near to hand and fingers.")

=== Gwawdodyn byr ===
Gwawdodyn byr ("short gwawdodyn") (Welsh pronunciation: [gwau̯'doːdɨ̞n 'bɨ̞r]), also known simply as gwawdodyn, is a stanza of lines of 9, 9, 10, and 9 syllables, with a caesura usually after the fifth syllable in each line. The first two lines are couplet in the nine-syllable cyhydedd naw ban metre, and the last two lines are a toddaid with the usual cross-rhyming between the gair cyrch and the fifth syllable of the line which follows it. Sometimes, in addition, the fifth syllable in the same line as the gair cyrch can also rhyme with the gair cyrch, but this is not found in every example.

The following stanza, by William Llŷn (16th century), has internal rhymes of cynghanedd sain in lines 1 and 3, and cynghanedd lusg in line 2. The fourth line has cynghanedd groes, but the last line and a half taken together is an extended cynghanedd sain:

Mawr y sych y gwynt, / helynt / hwyliad, (S)
Mawr y gwlych y glaw, / pan ddel cawad, (L)
Mawr gryfdwr / yw'r dŵr / ar doriad––gweilgi, (S)
Mwy yw'r daioni / ym mro Danad. (C)

("Great is the drying of the wind, a trouble for sailing,
Great is the wetting of rain when a shower comes,
Great is the strength of the water on the breaking of the ocean;
Greater is the goodness in the region of Tanat.")

The following earlier example is from Dafydd Nanmor (15th century) from his ode to Dafydd ap Tomas ap Dafydd. In the first two lines the caesura is after the 4th syllable:

Un llaw ydwyd / ar wayw yn llidiog, (C)
Â llaw Domas / ar wayw lledemog; (C)
Ef a'th ad / Duw Dad / odidog––deirgwart (S)
Yn nhyrau Edwart / yn hir oediog. (C)

("You are one hand on a spear, angry,
With Tomas's hand on his studded spear;
Wonderful God the Father will allow you (to stay) three quarters
In Edward's towers for a long lifetime.")

The gwawdodyn byr is used in two poems by Dafydd ap Gwilym, Moliant Ieuan Llwyd ab Ieuan Fwyaf and Moliant Hywel, Deon Bangor ("Praise of Hywel, Dean of Bangor"). In the second of these, three stanzas of englyn unodl union begin the poem, before the metre changes to the gwawdodyn.

=== Gwawdodyn hir ===
Occasionally an extra two lines are added to the gwawdodyn to make a gwawdodyn hir ("long gwawdodyn"), with lines of 9, 9, 9, 9, 10, 9 syllables. An example from Dafydd Nanmor's demonstration ode for Dafydd ap Tomas ap Dafydd (15th century) is the following:

Anos / yw d'aros, / a'th wayw diriog (S)
Wrth gastell / no'r wiber asgellog; (L)
A'th ofn ar feilch, / a'th faner fylchiog (C)
Yn dilyn gwaedwyr / hyd Lan Gadog, (C)
O'r bron, / uwch afon, / a chyfog – bob dri (S)
Y gwŷr, a'u torri / yn gwarterog. (C)

("It is more difficult to withstand you, and your conquering spear,
By the castle, than the winged viper;
And your terror upon the proud, and your torn banner,
Following blood-men as far as Llangadog,
From the hill, above the river, and the vomiting three by three
Of the men, and cutting them into quarters.")

As before, the last couplet is a toddaid of 10 syllables + 9.

Cynghanedd is used: (L) = cynghanedd lusg, (S) = cynghanedd sain, (C) = cynghanedd groes. Lines with cynghanedd sain are divided into three sections by their internal rhymes; they also have alliteration in the 2nd and 3rd sections (e.g. d'ar ... dir in line 1 above and chaf ... chyf in line 5). In lines with cynghanedd lusg, the penultimate syllable rhymes with a word earlier in the line.

Another example, by Wiliam Llŷn (16th century), is the following:

Ef a wnaed derwgist / a faint hirgawr (C)
I roi'i gorff addfwyn, / eurgarw ffyddfawr; (C)
A rhoi hon ymhell / dan ganghell-/lawr (S)
A rhoi gwaed ochain / uwch main / mynawr; (S)
A'i enaid a gaid / heb na gawr––na gwae; (S)
Yn y lle da mae / yn llaw Duw mawr. (C)

("An oak coffin was made and of giant size,
To place his gentle body, noble and mighty in faith;
And to put this far beneath the chancel floor,
And to shed the blood of groans above the marble stone;
And his soul was found without crying or woe;
It is in a good place, in the hand of the great God.")

Cynghanedd sain (S) is used in lines 3, 4, and 5, and cynghanedd groes (C) in lines 1, 2, and 6. The last two lines show the normal cross-rhymes of a toddaid hir.

=== Hir-a-thoddaid ===
Hir-a-thoddaid is a sestet, said to have been invented by Einion Offeiriad. It was added to the list by the middle of the fifteenth century, after a form of englyn was removed. In this metre all the lines have ten syllables. In most lines there is a caesura after the fifth syllable. The syllable at the end of the fifth line rhymes with the syllable before the caesura in the middle of line six.

The name hir-a-thoddaid ("long and toddaid") comes from there being four lines of long verse (cyhydedd hir) followed by a toddaid couplet.

The following example is by Dafydd ab Edmwnd (15th century):

Gwae fi am Degau! / gwiw fu am dygiant; (C)
Gan gario llafur / gwn gur a llifiant; (C)
Gwar rywiog ydiw; / goreu y gadant, (C)
Gannaid, o Gymry, / gwineudeg amrant; (C)
Gwawdwaith, / Eigr afiaith, / o groywfant––gweais; (S)
Gwiw iddi rhwymais / gywyddau rhamant. (C)

("Woe is me for Tegau! Worthy was she of good fortune;
By bearing trouble, I know pain and a flood of tears.
She is gentle and kind; the best of those they left behind.
Radiant one, of Wales, with wine-coloured glance.
A work of praise, joyful Eigr, from a pure sweet lip, I have woven;
Fitting for her, I have bound romantic poems.")

The cynghanedd in this example is shown as (C) = cynghanedd groes, (S) = cynghanedd sain. In addition every line begins with G, a feature which is known as cymeriad llythrennol.

The hir-a-thoddaid metre continues to be popular today. It is used in several sections of T. Gwynn Jones's poem Ymadawiad Arthur, which won the competition in the Eisteddfod of 1902. The most famous part as it is usually quoted begins:

Draw dros y don / mae bro dirion, / nad ery
Cwyn yn ei thir, / ac yno ne thery
Na haint na henaint / fyth mo'r rhai hynny
A ddêl i'w phur, rydd / awel, a phery
Pob calon yn hon / yn heiny a llon,
Ynys Afallon / ei hun sy felly.

("Yonder across the waves is a gentle region, where there does not stay
sorrow in its land, and there
neither plague nor old age ever afflicts those
who come to its pure, free breeze, and
every heart in it remains sprightly and joyful,
it is the Isle of Avalon itself which is thus.")

The first line above is irregular in having 11 syllables. Later, in 1910, Gywnn Jones issued a revised version omitting the word Draw.

The hir-a-thoddaid metre is also used in four-line stanzas in the first section of Hedd Wyn's famous ode Yr Arwr ("The Hero"), which won the chair in the 1917 Eisteddfod. The first stanza of Yr Arwr is as follows:

Wylo anniddig / dwfn fy mlynyddoedd (T)
A'm gwewyr glyw-wyd / ar lwm greigleoedd (T)
Canys Merch y Drycinoedd––oeddwn gynt: (T)
Criwn ym mawrwynt / ac oerni moroedd. (C)

("Fretful the weeping of my deep years,
And my anguish was heard on bare, rocky crags.
For I was once the Daughter of the Tempests:
Crying out in the great gale and the chill of the seas.")

=== Cyrch-a-chwta ===
Cyrch-a-chwta is an octave stanza, that was invented by Einion Offeiriad. A poem in cyrch-a-chwta has eight 7-syllable lines, in effect three couplets of cywydd deuair hirion and one couplet of awdl-gywydd. The same rhyme is shared by 1 to 6 and 8, while the last syllable of line 7 rhymes with the word before the caesura in line 8.

The following example is by Dafydd Nanmor (15th century), from his ode demonstrating the 24 metres for his patron Dafydd ap Tomas ap Dafydd.

Ond wyd ddoeth / a chyfoethog, (L)
A dewr a glew / mewn dur glog, (T)
A gwrol / a thrugarog, (T)
A di dlawd / a dlyedog, (C)
A llawen / a galluog, (T)
A dihafarch / wrth farchog? (L)
A dewr fuost / drwy fowart (C)
Yn llu Edwart yn llidiog. (C)

("But are you wise and wealthy,
And brave and valiant in a steel cloak,
And courageous and merciful,
And rich and noble,
And joyful and powerful,
And fearless against a knight?
And you were brave through boasting
In Edward's army, fiercely.")

(L) = cynghanedd lusg, (T) = cynghanedd draws, (C) = cynghanedd groes.

Another example is by Goronwy Owen (18th century), praising the Welsh language, as follows:

Neud esgud / un a'i dysgo, (C)
Nid cywraint / ond a'i caro, (C)
Nid mydrwr / ond a'i medro, (C)
Nid cynnil / ond a'i cano, (C)
Nid pencerdd / ond a'i pyncio, (C)
Nid gwallus / ond a gollo (C)
Natur ei iaith, / nid da'r wedd; (C)
Nid rhinwedd / ond ar honno. (C)

("Swift indeed is the one who learns it,
Yet none is skilled save he who loves it,
None a poet save he who masters it,
None prudent save he who sings it,
None a master musician save he who chants it,
None is faulty save he who loses
The nature of his language – bad is that form;
No virtue exists apart from it.")

The name cyrch-a-chwta means "abrupt and curt" or "attack and curtailed", perhaps referring to the rhymes in the last couplet.

=== Tawddgyrch cadwynog ===
Tawddgyrch cadwynog is based on rhupunt hir, but has a more complex rhyme scheme. It consists of two rhyming couplets of lines 16 syllables long, each line divided into 4-syllable sections. Sections 1, 2, and 3 of each line must rhyme with each other, but in the first couplet (as the example below shows) sections 1 and 2 are linked by consonance instead, and section 1 of the first line of the first couplet also rhymes with section 1 of the second line. The main rhyme continues, but the secondary rhymes are different in each couplet. The second couplet with its triple internal rhyme, is the same as rhupunt hir.

An early example of the metre is the following poem, written to honour Rhys ap Gruffudd, 12th-century ruler of Deheubarth in South Wales:

Ruddiant i feirdd, / fyrddeu dramwy, (BG)
Dramawr ofwy, / ofeg hael Nudd; (BG)
Hoywon a heirdd, / gan hardd facwy (BG)
Fyddant hwy rwy / o'i ra a'i rudd. (S+C)
Arfeu pybyr, / erfei dymyr, (Tbg)
Arfawg frehyr / a'r gwŷr gwaywrudd;
Arial milwyr, / eirieu myfyr, (Tbg)
Eryr rhyswyr, / Rhys ab Gruffudd. (S)

("Splendour for poets, tables of passage,
A great visitation, of the generous mind of Nudd;
Lively and beautiful men, alongside a handsome page,
They will have abundance of his grace and his gold.
Powerful weapons, fine territories,
An armed lord and his red-speared men;
The passion of soldiers, thoughtful words,
Eagle of combatants, Rhys son of Gruffudd.")

The cynghanedd in the above example is of a type typical of the 12th century. (BG) = cynghanedd braidd gyffwrdd, in which two words in the centre of the line are linked by alliteration; (Tbg) = cynghanedd draws bengoll, in which the end of the line has unmatched consonants.

A later version of the metre is found in the climax to Dafydd Nanmor's Ode to Dafydd ap Tomas ap Dafydd (15th century):

Bogwl cynnen, / bugail cannau, (C)
Briwa'r grannau, / bwrw'r gwŷr enwog, (C)
Bâr a brynnen', / bwrw beiriannau, (C)
Bwried rannau / brwydr dariannog. (C)
Bwrw'n y glynnau / bawb dros rynnau,
Bwrw'n y llynnau / â'th bren lliniog; (C)
Bwriaist gynnau / bobl ar frynnau;
Bwriwch ynnau, / wŷr Brycheiniog. (C)

("Threat of strife, shepherd of hundreds,
Smash the cheeks, cast down the famous men,
Wrath that they would merit, cast down the war-engines,
Let the portions of a battle with shields be cast down.
In the valleys cast everyone over the ridges,
In the lakes cast them down with your club (?)dripping with blood;
A short while ago you cast down people on the hills;
Strike now in your turn, men of Brycheiniog!")

In this section of his poem, in addition to the complex rhyme scheme with double rhymes (-ynnen, -annau, -ynnau), Dafydd Nanmor has also included cynghanedd groes (C) in six of the sections. In the second half of the poem in each 19-syllable line there is cynghanedd sain teirodl ("cynghanedd sain with three rhymes") filling the line. There is also cymeriad llythrennol with the repeated B- and Bwr- at the beginnings of the half-lines.

In the following example, from Guto'r Glyn (15th century), the first section of each line in the second half has no rhyme, but in compensation every half-line has cynghanedd groes:

Er bod talau / â’r bateloedd (C)
Wrth ryfeloedd / ni thrafaeliaf; (C)
O daw’r hwyliau / o’r dŵr heli (C)
At Duw Celi / i’w dai ciliaf, (C)
I’r fron uchel / gyfrinachus, (C)
I’r tir iachus / a’r tŵr uchaf, (C)
I gwrt Rhufain / a’i gartrefydd, (C)
I gôr crefydd / y gŵr cryfaf. (C)

("Though armies receive payments,
I will not journey on account of wars;
if the sails arrive from the sea’s waters,
I will retreat to the Lord God’s buildings,
to the secluded and lofty hill-side,
to the land which promotes healing and to the highest tower,
to the court of Rome and its dwelling places,
to the strongest man’s church of devotion.")

=== Gorchest y beirdd ===
The metre gorchest y beirdd ("Bards' masterpiece") was created by the poet Dafydd ab Edmwnd and added to the 24 metres at the Carmarthen Eisteddfod of c. 1491, when the englyn penfyr and englyn milwr were removed.

This consists of a couplet of two 15-syllable lines, each line divided 4 + 4 + 4 + 3 syllables. Each of the first three sections of each line has a double internal rhyme, while the last section rhymes with the other line of the couplet. In addition there is cynghanedd groes in each section, sections 1 and 2 of each line having their own separate cynghanedd groes, while sections 3 and 4 taken together have one long cynghanedd groes.

An example by Dafydd ab Edmwnd himself is as follows:

I'ch llys iach llawn / wiw Rys, yr awn, / (C, C)
A gwŷs a gawn, / agos ged; (C)
A'th fudd, wyth fael, / o gudd i'w gael, / (C, C)
Aur rhudd, ŵr hael, / rhwydd y rhed. (C)

("To your healthy, full court, worthy Rhys, we go,
And a summons we receive, a near gift;
And your gain, an eightfold reward, from hiding to be found,
Ruddy gold, generous man, freely it runs.")

Another example of a poem using the metre is:

I rhwydd air hîr, / i'w chwydd och wîr, (C, C)
I'w swydd a'i sîr, / y sydd saeth: (C)
I glai a glyn, / i rhai o'r hyn, / (C, C)
I ddai y ddyn, / i Dduw ddaeth. (C)

("To a free, long word, to its swelling—oh, truth!
To his office and his shire, which is an arrow:
To clay and valley, to some of these,
To the God of the man, to God he went.")

=== Cadwynfyr ===
The metre cadwynfyr ("short chain") is a quatrain created by the poet Dafydd ab Edmwnd and added to the classification at the Carmarthen Eisteddfod of c. 1491, when the englynion o'r hen ganiad (i.e. the three-lined englynion) were removed.

In cadwynfyr every line is 8 syllables long, and divided into two halves. Each half line has its own individual cynghanedd groes, but each line considered as whole also has cynghanedd groes. A further requirement is that there are two rhymes, one alternating between the end of lines 1 and 3 and the middle of lines 2 and 4, the other between the end of lines 2 and 4 and the middle of line 3, in the form of a chain.

The following example is by Dafydd ab Edmwnd himself. The meaning is not completely certain, but the rhyme and alliteration is clear:

Gwenfyn gwynfawr / geinfwyn gynfyl (C)
Gariad gweryl / giried gorau (C)
Gwirfudd gyrfau / gorfydd Gweirful (C)
Goruc eryl / gwiw ragorau (C)

("Fair maiden of great fairness, gentle and beautiful,
Love's dispute is the best grace.
True desire of paths Gweirful will overcome,
An extraordinary pursuit of worthy excellences.")

== Appendix: William Richards' metres ==
In his book The Welsh Nonconformists' Memorial; or, Cambro-British Biography (1820), the Welsh Baptist Minister William Richards wrote an account of a different tradition of the metres. He agrees with other authors that there are three primary distinctions of metre, namely the Cowydd, the Ynglyn, and the Awdl. He then divides the different possible lengths of verse into nine gorchanau ("elements of song or primary principles"), as follows:

Gorchanau:

- Cyhydedd fer (4 syllables)
- Cyhydedd gaeth (5 syllables)
- Cyhydedd drosgyl (6 syllables)
- Cyhydedd lefyn (7 syllables)
- Cyhydedd wastad (8 syllables)
- Cyhydedd draws (9 syllables)
- Cyhydedd wen (10 syllables)
- Cyhydedd laes (11 syllables)
- Cyhydedd hir (12 syllables)

In addition he specifies fifteen adlawiaid ("secondary or compound principles"), as follows:

Adlawiaid:

- Ban cyrch "recurrent pause"
- Toddaid "confluency"
- Triban Milwr "warrior's triplet"
- Triban cyrch "recurrent triplet"
- Cowydd "recitative"
- Traethodyn "compound recitative"
- Proest cadwynawyt "combined alternate rhyme"
- Proest cyfnewidiawg "combined vowel alternity"
- Clogyrnach "rugosity"
- Llostodyn "cuspidated strain"
- Llamgyrch "recurrent transition"
- Cadwyngyrch "recurrent catenation"
- Ynglyn "continuity"
- Cynghawg "complexity"
- Dyri "unconnected quantity"

Though some of the names are recognisable, Richards gives no details of how they are put together to form different metres.

== See also ==
- Medieval Welsh literature
- Welsh poetry
- Welsh literature
- Eisteddfod

== Bibliography ==
- Crawford, T. D. (1985). "The Englynion of Dafydd ap Gwilym". Études Celtiques. 22: 235–285.
- Crawford, T. D. (1990). "The Toddaid and Gwawdodyn byr in the poetry of Dafydd ap Gwilym, with an Appendix concerning the Traethodlau attributed to him". Études Celtiques. 27: 301–336. doi:10.3406/ecelt.1990.1935.
- Jacques, Michaela (2020). The Reception and Transmission of Bardic Grammars in Late Medieval and Early Modern Wales (Doctoral dissertation). Harvard University, Graduate School of Arts & Sciences.
- Jones, Edward (1784). Musical and Poetic Relicks of the Welsh Bards. London.
- Lloyd, D. M. (1968). "Some metrical features in Gogynfeirdd poetry". Studia Celtica 3, 38–46.
- Morris-Jones, John (1925). Cerdd Dafod. Oxford University Press.
- Parry, Thomas (1962). "The Welsh Metrical Treatise Attributed to Einion Offeiriad" (PDF). Proceedings of the British Society 47, 1961. Sir John Rhŷs Memorial Lecture. Vol. 47.
- Richards, William (1820). Evans, John (ed.). The Welsh Nonconformists' Memorial; or, Cambro-British Biography (PDF). London.
- Stephens, Meic, ed. (1998). The New Companion to the Literature of Wales. Cardiff: University of Wales Press. ISBN 0-7083-1383-3.
- Turco, Lewis (2020). The Book of Forms : A Handbook of Poetics (Fifth ed.). Albuquerque: University of New Mexico Press. ISBN 9780826361882.
