= Dafydd Offeiriad =

Dafydd Offeiriad was a 15th-century Welsh cleric and poet. His poetic work is known to have been vaticinatory. Little of his work is thought to survive. One surviving work, a cywydd, is held by the National Library of Wales.
