= Triban (poem) =

Traditional Welsh short folk poem form

The triban is a type of Welsh folk poem or song consisting of a four-line stanza arranged according to a specific pattern and rhyme scheme. It has lines of 7, 7, 8, 7 syllables with an accentual iambic rhythm, such that lines 1, 2, and 4 each have three accents, while line 3 has four accents. Lines 1, 2, and 4 rhyme together with an unaccented rhyme, while line 3, with an accented rhyme, rhymes with any syllable in the middle of line 4.

The triban is particularly associated with the Glamorgan (Morgannwg) region in South Wales. It is sometimes known as triban Morgannwg for that reason.

== Examples ==
Mi wnaf i'r creigiau hollti
Ac agor fel briallu
A gwnaf i'r llwynog fod mor ffôl
Â mynd ar ôl y milgi.

("I will make the rocks split
And open like a primrose;
And I will make the fox be so foolish
As to chase after the greyhound.")

The following is believed to date from before 1820 from pre-industrial Tredegar:

Mi dreiliais lawer diwrnod
Ar lan Sirhywi wiwglod,
I dynnu cnau ar frigau'r fro
A thwyllo'r glân frithyllod

("I spent many hours
on the bank of splendid Sirhowy,
Picking nuts from the country
and deceiving the gleaming trout.")

Line three of the poem also has cynghanedd sain, a traditional Welsh poetic pattern of internal rhyme and alliteration.

Another triban references the town of Caerphilly, about 7 miles north of Cardiff. The Piccadilly Inn is a historic local pub located on Piccadilly Square, Caerphilly:

Mae castell yng Nghaerffili
A gwely plu i gysgu,
A lle da i ware wic
O flaen y Picadili.

("There is a castle in Caerphilly
And a feather bed for sleeping,
And a good place to play tag
In front of the Piccadilly.")

Another triban mentions the town of Aberdare, near Merthyr Tydful in Glamorgan:

Os ffaelis yn fy amsar
Gael tyddyn wrth fy mhlesar,
Pan af i fynwant Aberdâr
Caf yno siâr o’r ddaear.

("If I fail in my time
To get a smallholding to my liking,
When I go to Aberdare cemetery
I will get a share of the earth there.")

The following triban was quoted by a writer in 1754. The rhythm of line 3 is slightly syncopated but it still has the usual four accents. In a whisky mill, the "pillows" are the bearings which carry the rollers, and the "bridge" is the frame holding the machinery together; but they are here used metaphorically.

Roedd hon yn felin wisgi,
Yn troi â dwr o tani,
A dwy obenydd a’i phont bres;
yr oedd hi’n llafnes lysti.

("This one was a whisky mill,
Turning with water underneath her,
And two pillows and her brass bridge;
She was a lusty girl.")

== History and Cultural Significance ==
The triban is believed to have been one of the metres of the Clêr (itinerant poets/minstrels) in the Middle Ages. The earliest surviving examples date back to the 16th century. It became a highly popular metre sung all across Wales, but it is uniquely characteristic of the folk poetry tradition of Glamorgan, with examples tied to the Mari Lwyd custom and other folk traditions. However, it is less often heard as a folk poem in Glamorgan today, since the number of Welsh speakers in the region is now only 12% or less.

Quotations in the dictionary Geiriadur Prifysgol Cymru show that the triban was formerly accompanied by the harp (telyn (1608) or crwth (18th-19th century). It could also be sung by a ploughman to encourage the oxen.

The origin of the name triban ("three parts" or "three limbs") is obscure. One 18th-century scholar argued that the poem is so called because it has three parts, namely line 1, line 2, and then lines 3 and 4 together as a long line of 15 syllables. However, in one of the traditional folk tunes to which it is sung, line 1 is sung separately, then lines 2 and 3 together, then line 4 separately, with a short snatch of music between each part.

== Form and rhyme scheme ==
In form and rhyme scheme the popular triban is very similar to the more formal Welsh poetic stanza known as the englyn cyrch. One difference is that the englyn cyrch has 7 syllables in every line.

The triban is also similar in structure to the limerick, in that the beats of the triban are 3 + 3 + 4 + 3, with the main rhyme in the first, second, and final line. However, in the limerick the rhythm is anapaestic rather than iambic, and also in the limerick the 3rd line is divided into two separate parts, each with its own rhyme, making it 3 + 3 + 2 + 2 + 3 beats. Both the limerick and the triban are popular in Wales today, and each has its own section as part of the Welsh poetry competition in the National Eisteddfod.

The rhyme scheme, in which the last syllable of the penultimate line rhymes with a syllable in the middle of the last line, is found in a number of metres in formal Welsh poetry, such as englyn cyrch, awdl-gywydd, cywydd llosgyrnog, bir-a-thoddaid, cadwynfyr, clogyrnach, cyhydedd hir, cyrch-a-chwta, gorchest-a-beirdd, gwawdodyn, rhupunt hir, and tawddgyrch cadwynog. (For these metres see Traditional Welsh poetic metres.)

== Triban and Plaid Cymru ==
Using another meaning of ban ("peak, summit"), the name triban is also the name of the former Plaid Cymru logo because it contains three peaks (tri ban), which are three triangles in the colours of Wales representing the Welsh mountains. This logo was used from 1933 to 2006, when the party decided to adopt a new official logo of a yellow Welsh poppy. The name Triban is still used, however, for the party's donation scheme.

== Bibliography ==
- Jones, Tegwyn (1976). Tribannau Morgannwg.
