= Dafydd ab Edmwnd =

Welsh poet

Dafydd ab Edmwnd (fl. c. 1450–97) was one of the most prominent Welsh language poets of the Later Middle Ages.

== Life ==
Dafydd was born into a family of Norman ancestry in Hanmer, in Flintshire (now Wrexham County Borough), north-east Wales. As a freeman and landowner within Welsh society he was not, like most of his contemporaries, dependent upon patronage.

Dafydd was the bardic disciple of Maredudd ap Rhys and was in turn, the bardic tutor of Tudur Aled and Gutun Owain.

== Poetry ==
The main themes of Dafydd’s poetry were love and nature in the tradition of Dafydd ap Gwilym. His best-known poems include the following cywyddau:

- Cywydd Merch ("To a girl")
- I Wallt Merch ("A lady’s hair")
- Enwi’r Ferch ("Naming the girl")

Unlike many of his contemporaries, such as Guto'r Glyn or Lewys Glyn Cothi, Dafydd eschewed the Wars of the Roses and politics. However, Dafydd was moved to compose an elegy for his friend, the harpist Siôn Eos, who was hanged for killing a man in a tavern brawl. In this, arguably his finest poem, Dafydd expresses his own anti-English sentiment, and regrets that Siôn Eos could not have been sentenced under the more humane Welsh Laws of Hywel Dda, resulting in compensation being paid to the victim’s family rather than being sentenced to the death penalty under cyfraith Lundain ("London’s law").

- Marwnad Siôn Eos ("The Death of Sion Eos")

== 1450 eisteddfod and its legacy ==
In 1450 Dafydd won the silver chair at an eisteddfod held at Carmarthen. This was achieved with a cywydd in praise of the Trinity, which exemplified the 24 metres of Welsh bardic poetry reformed by Dafydd, previously codified by Einion Offeiriad and Dafydd Ddu o Hiraddug. He deleted two metres and replaced them with the more complicated Gorchest y Beirdd and the Cadwynfyr.

The 24 metres presented by Dafydd at the eisteddfod became widely adopted throughout Wales. While the training of poets had always been kept within bardic circles, with the craft handed down from tutor to pupil, Dafydd’s reforms of the metres subsequently increased the segregation between the “professional elite” and the amateur poets. However the consequence of this, and of Dafydd in particular, was that greater emphasis was placed upon the bardic craft with its adherence to the stricter metres rather than on the content and theme of the poems. The passion and intensity of Dafydd ap Gwilym and Llywelyn Goch ap Meurig Hen tended to be lost.

== Bibliography ==
- Gwaith Dafydd ab Edmwnd (ed. by Thomas Roberts, Bangor, 1914).
- Welsh Literature - Chapter 7: Poets of the Gentry
- Meic Stephens, The New Companion to the Literature of Wales (University of Wales Press, Cardiff 1998)
- Gwyn Williams, The Burning Tree: Poems from the First Thousand Years of Welsh Verse (Faber and Faber, 1956). Includes a complete translation of the poems.
