= Traethodl =

The traethodl is a Welsh verse form consisting of couplets in which seven-syllabled lines rhyme. It is first attested in medieval Welsh literature. With the addition of cynghanedd, it was elaborated in the 14th century and developed into the cywydd.

Very few poems in this metre have survived, but one is The Poet and the Grey Friar by the 14th-century poet Dafydd ap Gwilym. This poem of 44 rhyming couplets has the appearance of a cywydd, like most of Dafydd's other poems, but it mostly lacks the ornamentation of internal rhymes and consonance known as cynghanedd: in fact only five of the lines have cynghanedd. The rules for rhyme also are less strict, since a cywydd must have one stressed and one unstressed rhyme in each couplet (in either order), whereas this poem has several couplets where both rhymes are unstressed (e.g. Dáfydd ... cýwydd in the last couplet). (There are no couplets, however, where both rhymes are stressed.) Most of the lines have seven syllables, as in a cywydd, but there are some (lines 49, 63, 66, 76) where there appear to be eight syllables. It is not clear, however, if this is a permissible feature of the metre or simply a copyist's error.

Three other traethodl poems have been attributed to Dafydd ap Gwilym, though rejected as inauthentic by Parry. These are Y Ceiliog Rhedyn a'r Grugionyn ("The Grasshopper and the Ant"), Eiddig a'r Toryn ("The Jealous Man and the Cloak") and Y Gath a'r Llygoden ("The Cat and the Mouse"). An analysis of the poems reveals that apart from an almost complete lack of cynghanedd in the last of these, the features of all four poems are very similar.

The etymology of the name traethodl is unknown; possibly it is from traeth "treatise" and odl "rhyme".

== Works cited ==
- T.D. Crawford (1990). "The Toddaid and Gwawdodyn byr in the poetry of Dafydd ap Gwilym, with an Appendix concerning the Traethodlau attributed to him". Études Celtiques. 27: 301–336. doi:10.3406/ecelt.1990.1935.
- dafyddapgwilym.net. Website containing all of Dafydd ap Gwilym's poems with notes and translations. (University of Swansea).

== See also ==
- Welsh poetry
- Cywydd
- Traditional Welsh poetic metres
