= William Phylip =

Welsh poet and Royalist supporter (c. 1590-1670)

William Phylip (c.1590-1670) was a Welsh poet and Royalist supporter.

The son of Phylip Sion ap Tomas (died 1625), he was born about 1590. In 1649, on the death of Charles I, he wrote a Welsh elegy on the king, which was printed in the same year. Under the Commonwealth his property at Hendre Fechan, near Barmouth in Merionethshire, was confiscated, and he was forced to go into hiding. After an interval he made his peace with the authorities, who made him a collector of taxes. He died at a great age on 11 February 1670, and was buried in Llanddwywe churchyard.

Poem 123 in the Oxford Book of Welsh Verse (p. 152) is a poem of farewell he wrote to Hendre Fechan when he was forced to flee his home, leaving behind his books of poetry. It consists of four verses in the metre englyn unodl union.
