= Guto'r Glyn =

Welsh poet and soldier

Guto'r Glyn (c. 1412 – c. 1493) was a Welsh language poet and soldier of the era of the Beirdd yr Uchelwyr ("Poets of the Nobility") or Cywyddwyr ("cywydd-men"), the itinerant professional poets of the later Middle Ages. He is considered one of the greatest exponents, if not the greatest, of the tradition of "praise-poetry", verse addressed to a noble patron.

== Biography ==
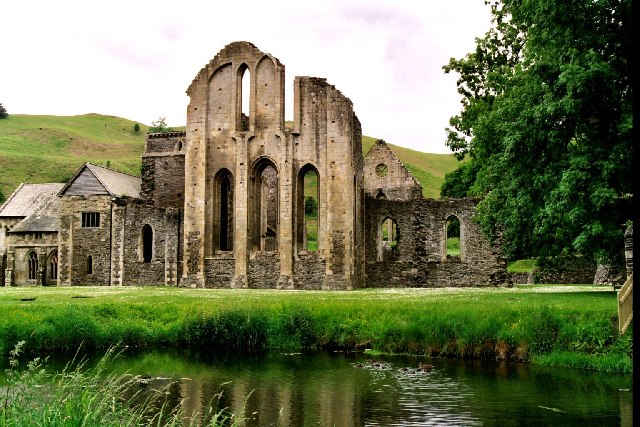
Valle Crucis Abbey. Guto spent his last years here, and it has been suggested that he was adopted by the abbey and educated there.

Guto is associated with the Ceiriog Valley, in the modern Wrexham county borough of north-east Wales, and many of his patrons lived in the same region, although he visited houses across Wales in the course of his journeys. His early life is obscure, but Glyn Ceiriog or Glyndyfrdwy have been suggested as his places of birth in the years between 1412 and 1420. It is also possible that y Glyn refers to Valle Crucis Abbey, and various suggestions and references within his poetry infer that he may have been a child adopted by and brought up at the abbey itself, explaining some of his later association with Cistercian institutions: he was certainly not from the noble or gentry class and may have come from a farming family. Guto is a diminutive of the Welsh name Gruffudd, and his father's name was Siancyn, so he was probably christened Gruffudd ap Siancyn using the patronymic system of the time. His poetic career seems to have blossomed relatively early and he was already a well-known poet by the early 1430s, while in 1441 he is known to have enlisted to fight in the Hundred Years War.

From various of his poems we know that Guto was large and physically strong, recognised for his courage and sporting prowess, wore a beard and had black hair (though he rapidly went bald, leading him to jokingly compare himself to a tonsured monk wandering the countryside). Poets of the time commonly traded insults in verse, and the Hanmer poet Dafydd ap Edmund wrote that Guto was not good-looking and had a nose like a billhook, while another poet described him as having the alarming features of a bear.

He was acknowledged as a master of praise poetry forms, an opinion echoed by the poet Tudur Aled, though he was also skilled at satirical poetry and like most bards of the period could exhibit a sharp humour on occasion. Work as a drover led to an incident in which he lost the priest of Corwen's sheep, instigating a poetic controversy with his rival Tudur Penllyn. While Guto chides Penllyn, who worked as a drover and wool-merchant, for not assisting him and vows never to set foot in the Marches again, Penllyn responds by describing a fantastical end for Guto's flock and suggests that Guto has in fact stolen the sheep to give to his wool-combing wife in Oswestry, in the process including digs at Guto's baldness. His finest and, to modern understanding, most powerful poems were written at the end of his long life and reflect on mortality, while he dismissed his earlier work as "babbling sweet nonsense continually" ("malu son melys ennyd").

As a soldier, Guto fought on the Yorkist side during the Wars of the Roses, and composed poems in praise of King Edward IV and prominent Yorkists such as William Herbert and Sir Roger Kynaston. Despite this, after the Battle of Bosworth he praised Welsh Lancastrian Rhys ap Thomas for killing Richard III, writing that he "killed the boar, shaved his head". He also fought in France, and was widely travelled by the standards of his time. From one of his poems, In praise of Oswestry, it is apparent he lived for some years in the Shropshire town of which he described himself "Long wedded here, a burgess am I" (i.e. a freeman of the borough). He spent his last years in blindness as a lay guest at the Cistercian abbey of Valle Crucis, near Llangollen.

== Metre of the poems ==
Guto'r Glyn's surviving work consists of about 110 poems. Of these the great majority are cywyddau, written in the cywydd deuair hirion metre. However, there are also five awdlau (odes) written in more elaborate metres, richly ornamented with alliteration and rhyme, and two poems consisting only of stanzas of englyn unodl union:

- Poem 8: Ode in praise of Abbot Rhys ap Dafydd of Strata Florida. There are ten englynion (a mixture of two six-line and two-four line englyn proest cyfnewidiog, and six englyn unodl union), followed by 6 stanzas of tawddgyrch cadwynog.
- Poem 12: Ode in praise of Dafydd ap Tomas of Blaen-tren. It consists of 7 englynion (with a mixture of englyn unodl union, englyn proest cyfnewidiog and englyn proest cadwynog), followed by 9 couplets of cyhydedd hir.
- Poem 43: Ode in praise of Syr Benet, parson of Corwen. There are eight englynion (a mixture of englyn unodl union and englyn proest cyfnewidiog, including two with six lines), followed by 15 couplets of cyhydedd nawban.
- Poem 46: Guto’r Glyn’s response to Ieuan ap Tudur Penllyn. It consists of 7 stanzas of englyn unodl union only. The rhyme -in is used throughout.
- Poem 111: Ode in praise of Abbot Dafydd ab Ieuan of Valle Crucis. There are nine englynion of different types, followed by 4 stanzas of tawddgyrch cadwynog.
- Poem 113: Ode in praise of Abbot Dafydd ab Ieuan of Valle Crucis. There are 11 stanzas of englyn unodl union, all with the rhyme –au, followed by ten stanzas of clogyrnach, all with the main rhyme –o, and ending in one englyn unodl union. In the clogyrnach section, every line begins with D.
- Poem 119: His last englyn. It consists of a single englyn unodl union, apparently written in Guto's old age.

== Editions ==
- Ifor Williams (ed.), Gwaith Guto'r Glyn (University of Wales Press, 1939). Annotated edition of the poems, in Welsh.
- Gyto'r Glyn.net Online edition, translations and notes by Ann Parry Owen and nine others, University of Wales.
