= Cynghanedd =

Sound form within Welsh poetry

In Welsh-language poetry, cynghanedd (Welsh pronunciation: [kəŋˈhaneð], literally "concinnity" or "harmony") is the concept of sound-arrangement within one line, using stress, alliteration and rhyme. The various forms of cynghanedd are used in all formal Welsh verse forms, such as the cywydd, awdl and englyn. Cynghanedd developed gradually over the period 1100–1350; by the middle of the 14th century it had developed into a fixed system with four recognised types: cynghanedd groes, cynghanedd draws, cynghanedd sain, and cynghanedd lusg. The system of strict cynghanedd (y gynghanedd gaeth) is particularly associated with the cywydd poets of the period c. 1330–1640. From the 15th century onwards it became a requirement for serious poetry that virtually every line should have one or other of the four types of cynghanedd.

Though of ancient origin, cynghanedd and variations of it are still used today by many Welsh-language poets. A number of poets have experimented with using cynghanedd in English-language verse, for instance Gerard Manley Hopkins. Some of Dylan Thomas's work is also influenced by cynghanedd.

== Forms of cynghanedd ==
The four main forms of cynghanedd are the following:

- Cynghanedd groes: In this, most or all of the consonants of the first half of the line (except usually the last) are repeated in the same order in the second half. The consonants must be arranged in the same way around the stressed vowel in each half:

Hudolion / a'i hadeilws
["Magicians made it"]

- Cynghanedd draws: In this, the consonants in the first section of the line are repeated at the end of the line, but there are some unmatched consonants in the centre of the line:

Deithum / i ddinas dethol
["I came to a choice town"]

- Cynghanedd sain: In this, the line is divided into three parts. Parts 1 and 2 rhyme, and parts 2 and 3 are linked by the repetition of at least one consonant:

Nac undydd / i drefydd / drwg
["Not one day to evil towns"]

- Cynghanedd lusg: In this, the ending of a word earlier in the line rhymes with the stressed penultimate syllable of a polysyllabic word at the end of the line. There is no alliteration:

Haws cerdded nos / ar rosydd
["It is easier to walk on moors at night"]

The above forms apply in any metre. The following applies only in certain metres, such as the stanza-form englyn unodl union:

- Cynghanedd gyrch: The consonants in the last word or words of a line are repeated at the beginning or in the middle of the following line.

The term cynghanedd gytsain ["consonantal cynghanedd"] refers to any kind of consonantal cynghanedd, including cynghanedd groes and cynghanedd draws.

Because the noun cynghanedd is feminine, the descriptors croes, traws, llusg, cyrch and cytsain are mutated to groes, draws, lusg, gyrch and gytsain when they follow it.

Examples in this article

Cynghanedd can be applied to lines of any length, but in this article, most of the illustrative examples are from the commonly used seven-syllable cywydd metre, popularised by Dafydd ap Gwilym in the 14th century. In a cywydd poem, nearly every line has some form of cynghanedd, but the poet is free to use the different types in random order.

Note that ⟨dd⟩, ⟨ll⟩ and ⟨ch⟩ are digraphs in the Welsh alphabet, each representing a single consonant /ð/, /ɬ/ and /χ/ respectively.

== Cynghanedd groes ==
In cynghanedd groes ("cross-harmony"), a line is divided into two roughly equal halves, by a caesura or break; in a seven-syllable line with cynghanedd groes, this caesura is usually after the 3rd syllable, but sometimes after the 2nd or 4th. With certain exceptions, all the consonants in the first half of the line are repeated in the second half in the same order. However, the consonants at the very end of each half of the line must be different.

The stressed vowels also play a role, in that those consonants which precede and follow the main stressed vowel in the first half of the line must do the same in the second half. (The main stressed vowel in each half is considered to be the last stressed vowel in each half line.) The main stressed vowel of each half must be different, but vowels other than those under the main stresses may be of any kind.

The caesura or break (gorffwysfa) between the two halves of the line in cynghanedd groes is often marked by a break in sense; but in some lines the words flow on smoothly without any pause, especially in the kind called "linked" cynghanedd (cynghanedd o gyswllt).

=== Classification ===
There are three main different types of cynghanedd groes, classified according to whether the last syllable in each half-line is stressed or unstressed. Three types are permitted: stressed ending + stressed, unstressed ending + unstressed, and stressed ending + unstressed. The fourth type, unstressed + stressed, is not used in cynghanedd groes or cynghanedd draws, but is found in cynghanedd sain.

A stressed ending in either half of the line is usually a monosyllable; but it can also be a polysyllable stressed on the final, such as erioed ("ever before"), prynhawn ("afternoon") or Caerdyf ("Cardiff").

==== Type 1 ====
The simplest and most common kind of cynghanedd groes is a line where both halves of the line end in a stressed syllable. This type is known as cynghanedd gytbwys acennog ["balanced, accented cynghanedd"]. In this type the consonants are repeated only up as far as the stressed vowel, but not usually after it. A seven-syllable line may be divided 3 syllables + 4, or 4 syllables + 3.

The example below, taken from Dafydd ap Gwilym (14th century), has the consonantal pattern {N D [stress]} in both halves:

Yn y dydd / ai un ai dwy
["In the day either one (girl) or two"]

The second, also by Dafydd ap Gwilym, has the more complex pattern {G R Dd D R [stress]} in both halves, as in this line describing the wind:

Agwrdd drwst / a gerdda draw
["A mighty commotion which passes yonder"]

Occasionally the break may be found after the fourth syllable, as in the following example, which has the pattern {L L M [stress]} in both halves:

Lawlaw â mi / lili mor
["Nearby me, lily of the sea"]

The break may also be found after the second syllable, but this is rare:

Glyn gwyrdd / y galwynau gwin
["Green valley of the flagons of wine"]

When the word carrying the stress in the first half starts with a vowel or a semivowel with no consonant immediately preceding, the matching word in the second half often also starts with a vowel or semivowel, as if the vocalic onset itself was the equivalent of a consonant. The following example from Dafydd ap Gwilym reports the words of an angry husband chasing Dafydd:

Llyma'i ôl / a llym yw ef!
["There are his tracks – a sharp one, he is!"]

Another example from the same poem is the following line describing icicles:

Dagrau oer, / dagerau iâ
["Cold tears, daggers of ice"]

It can be seen from these examples that the secondary stresses (e.g. dágrau, dagérau) do not affect the position of the consonants in the cynghanedd. It is only the last stress in each half of the line which is taken into account.

But although the last consonant before the stress usually comes directly before the stressed vowel in both halves of the line, or is separated from it in both halves, it is also sometimes possible to have another vowel intervening in one half but not the other, as in this line by Tudur Aled, where the consonant {N} directly precedes the stress in the first half, but is separated from it in the second:

Mi a’i gwnaf, / o’ m genau i,
["I will do it, from my own mouth"]

==== Type 2 ====
In a second type, known as cynghanedd gytbwys ddiacen ["balanced, unaccented cynghanedd"], both halves of the line end in feminine ending with unstressed final. Here the consonants both before and after the stressed vowel are repeated, but the consonants at the very end of each half must not match. Again, the line may be divided 3 + 4, or 4 + 3. The first example below, by Dafydd ap Gwilym, is divided 3 syllables + 4, and has the pattern {H L B R [stress] N W}:

Hwylbrenwyllt / heli bronwyn
["The wild-masted, white-breasted sea"]

The following is by Dafydd ab Edmwnd (15th century), with consonants {B N F [stress] L}:

Benfelen / bun o Faelawr
["A yellow-haired maid of Maelor"]

Occasionally with type 2 the break is found after the fourth syllable. The following has the pattern {Ll R I [stress] N G}:

Llywiwr iawngamp / llariangerdd
["Excellent ruler of gentle verse"]

If the stressed vowel in the first half is followed by a vowel or semivowel, the corresponding stressed vowel in the matching word in the second half is likewise followed by a vowel or semivowel, as in this example by Dafydd ap Gwilym. Here the pattern is {G R [stress] [vowel]}:

Ag aur eos / garuaidd
["And the beloved golden nightingale"]

This type with an unstressed ending in each half of the line is less common than type 1.

==== Type 3 ====
In the third type of cynghanedd groes, known as cynghanedd anghytbys ddisgynedig ["descending unbalanced cynghanedd"], the first half-line ends in a monosyllable, and the second half in a polysyllable stressed on the penultimate. (The reverse, namely unstressed + stressed (cynghanedd anghytbwys dyrchafedig ["raised, unbalanced cynghanedd"]), is not found in cynghanedd groes although it is common in cynghanedd sain.) Here the division of the line must be 3 syllables + 4.

In this type, any consonants immediately following the stressed vowel are repeated in both halves. An example is this line by Dafydd ap Gwilym from his poem The Seagull, which repeats the seven consonants {D R N F L H [stress] L}:

Darn fal haul / dyrnfol heli
["Like a piece of sun, a gauntlet of sea"]

In the following line in the same way all the consonants of the first half, {C R Dd W [stress] S}, are repeated in the same order in the second half; but the second ⟨w⟩ in the word dewiswyrdd is not used:

Cerdda, was, / câr ddewiswyrdd
["Go, lad, admire the superb greenery"]

If the monosyllable at the end of the first half has no consonant after the stressed vowel, the polysyllable at the end of the second line should also have no consonant (or only a semivowel) after its stressed vowel, as in this line by Tudur Aled (16th century), in which the pattern is {G Ll M [stress]}:

Gwell i mi / golli ' mywyd
["It would be better for me to lose my life"]

If the stressed vowel in the first half is followed by two different consonants, both consonants may be echoed in the second half, as in this line attributed to Wiliam Llŷn (16th century):

Eryr gwyllt / ar war gelltydd
["A wild eagle on the heights of the cliffs"]

In other lines of this kind, however, in combinations such as ⟨br⟩, ⟨dl⟩, ⟨ml⟩ etc., where in spoken language an epenthetic vowel may be added between the consonants, the second consonant after the stressed vowel in the first half is often omitted from the cynghanedd, as in this line by Tudur Aled (16th century), in which the ⟨l⟩ of crupl is ignored:

A' r dyn crupl / er doe' n cropian
["and the crippled man, even yesterday, was crawling"]

This is known as cynghanedd drychben ("truncated head cynghanedd").

=== Unmatched consonants ===
In cynghanedd groes there are in principle no consonants in the second half of the line which are not part of the consonantal echoing, apart from the consonant or consonants at the very end of the line. However, there are certain exceptions to this rule: for example, the consonant ⟨h⟩ and the semivowels ⟨w⟩ and ⟨i̯⟩ (as in iach) can optionally be ignored.

For example, in the following line by Tudur Aled, the ⟨w⟩ in both halves is unmatched, the pattern being {R [stress] N}:

Ar ei winoedd / ar unwaith
["On his wines, immediately"]

One regular feature of cynghanedd groes is that the first ⟨n⟩ of either half can be ignored. Thus in the following line by Wiliam Llŷn (16th century), the first ⟨n⟩ is ignored in the pattern {Ll [stress] DR}:

Anllywodraeth / a lladrad
["Anarchy and brigandage"]

In the following line by Dafydd ap Gwilym, in which the pattern in each half is {H R Dd C [stress]}, the first ⟨n⟩ of the second half is omitted from the cynghanedd:

Hirddu cas / yn hyrddio coed
["(Winter), long, dark and unpleasant, buffeting the trees"]

Lines like the above, with an ignored ⟨n⟩ at the beginning of the second half, are considered to be a case of "lost ⟨n⟩ in the middle" (n ganolgoll) rather than cynghanedd draws.

The consonant ⟨f⟩ can also sometimes be ignored, for example in the following line, where the pattern is {P N Dd [stress] L}:

Poen ddolur, / pan feddylier
["A sore pain, when it is remembered"]

=== Cynghanedd groes o gyswllt ===
Occasionally a consonant at the end of the first half-line can be used to complete the pattern of the second half. This is known as cynghanedd groes o gyswllt ["cross harmony from linking"] Thus in the following line, by the early 19th-century poet Dewi Wyn o Eifion, the consonantal pattern in the first half is {F R [stress] N}. The letter ⟨f⟩ of wennaf is used to make the same pattern in the second half. (The consonant ⟨w⟩ is ignored.)

Fair wennaf_/_o rianedd
["Mary, fairest of maidens"]

Cynghanedd groes o gyswllt first became common about the middle of the 15th century. There are no certain instances of it in the 14th century. Thus a line such as the following by Dafydd ap Gwilym should probably be taken as an example of unanswered initial ⟨n⟩ rather than assuming that the consonants are {N Th L [stress] S} with linking:

Na Thaliesin / ei thlysach
["Nor did Taliesin (ever love) anyone as beautiful as she"]

In the following line of the 15th-century poet Guto'r Glyn the pattern is {R CR [stress] [vowel]}. The ⟨r⟩ at the end of Creawdr is carried forward to complete the pattern in the second half:

Ar y Creawdr_/_y criaf
["To the Creator I will cry"]

In the following line, by Dewi Wyn o Eifion, two consonants, ⟨d⟩ and ⟨l⟩, are adopted from the first section into the second to make the pattern {D L R G [stress] N} in both halves:

Dal i' r genedl_/_aur gannwyll
["Holding to the nation a golden candle"]

Occasionally the same consonant is needed for the pattern in both halves of the line. In the following example by Gwilym ab Ieuan Hen (15th century), the ⟨n⟩ from sôn is used twice, once to complete the pattern {N D S [stress] N} in the first half, and again to start the same pattern in the second half:

Nid o sôn_/_y daw synnwyr
["It is not from talk that sense comes"]

Similarly in the following line by R. Williams Parry (20th century), the ⟨m⟩ of mi is used twice to create the pattern {M L S M [stress]} in both halves:

Melys i mi_/_lais y mor
["Sweet to me is the voice of the sea"]

The reverse situation is also possible, when a consonant from the beginning of the second half is used in order to complete the pattern of the first half. Thus in the following line, in order to complete the pattern {S D H [stress] N} in the first half, the ⟨n⟩ of nos is borrowed from the beginning of the second half:

Os daw hi,_/_nos da i'w hwyneb
["If she comes, (say) good night to her face"]

The above type, in which the first consonant in the second half is adopted to complete the pattern in the first half, is known as cynghanedd gysylltben.

It is assumed that in all lines of this type there was no pause in the middle of the line during recitation.

=== Two consonants matched by one ===
Sometimes in cynghanedd groes a consonant which comes twice in succession in one half of the line corresponds to a single consonant in the other half, as in this line by Dafydd ap Gwilym addressing the wind, where the two ⟨r⟩s in the first half correspond to a single ⟨r⟩ in the second half, creating the pattern {G R S [stress]}:

Gŵr eres wyd / garw ei sain
["You are a strange man, with a harsh voice"]

In the following, by Siôn Phylip (16th century), two ⟨r⟩s in the second half correspond to one in the first, creating the pattern {C R D [stress] Ch}. The ⟨h⟩ of ⟨rh⟩ is ignored:

Crïwyd uwch / caer Rhydychen
["There was weeping above the wall of Oxford"]

=== Pronunciation of consonants ===
In cynghanedd of the medieval period, the consonants ⟨b, d, g⟩ can be pronounced as if they were ⟨p, t, c⟩, even though the spelling is unchanged. This happens (a) when an ⟨h⟩ follows, (b) when they are doubled. For example, in the following line by Ieuan Deulwyn (15th century), ⟨b+h⟩ corresponds to ⟨p⟩, making the pattern {H P [stress] R} in both halves of the line:

Heb hiraeth / – hi a'i peris
["Without longing – it is she who caused it"]

In this line of Lewis Glyn Cothi (16th century), ⟨t⟩ corresponds to ⟨d+d⟩, making the pattern {Ch T [stress]}:

Achau y tad, / o chaid dydd
["The ancestry of the father, if one had a day (to hear it)"]

It is assumed that the pronunciation of ⟨d d⟩ in this line was /t/ in the poet's day, and that ⟨b h⟩ sounded like /p/.

On the other hand ⟨st⟩ can correspond to ⟨s d⟩, as in this line by Gruffudd ap Ieuan (16th century), where the pattern is {T R S D R C [stress]}:

Trist yw' r cwyn / tros awdur cerdd
["Sad is the complaint for an author of song"]

{R} and {H} in separate words can be matched by {Rh}, as in this line by Guto'r Glyn, where the repeated consonants are {M R H [stress] N}:

Mae' r henwyr? Ai meirw' r rheini?
["Where are the elders? Are they dead?"]

=== Irregular lines ===
Occasionally, the final word of the line is not involved in the cynghanedd. This is known as cynghanedd groes bengoll ["headless cross harmony"], for example:

Lle tew / lletyau / mwyeilch
["Where there are dense abodes of blackbirds"]

Other lines are irregular because their consonantal patterns do not quite match. For example, the following line, describing the snout of a fox, has the pattern {G F L [stress] NW} in the first half but the slightly different pattern {G L F [stress] NW} in the second:

Gefel unwedd / gylfinwaed
["His bloodstained snout like pincers"]

The following is irregular, since ⟨r⟩ in the first half and ⟨l⟩ in the second half are both ignored, but the other consonants match:

Gŵyr ei ddrem / gelu ei ddrwg
["His look knows how to hide his wickedness"]

Lines such as the following, by Lewys Glyn Cothi (15th century), praising a lady for her auspicious name, are also considered irregular since although the same consonants are used in both halves, they are arranged differently around the stressed vowels. Here the first half has the pattern {M R [stress] G R} but the second half has {M [stress] R G R}:

Mair o awgrym / yw Marg'red
["Margaret's name suggests Mary"]

This fault, where the consonants are arranged differently around the stress, is known as crych a llyfn ["wrinkled and smooth"].

== Cynghanedd draws ==
Cynghanedd draws (partial "cross-harmony", literally, "traversing cynghanedd") resembles cynghanedd groes, except that there are consonants at the beginning of the second half of the line which are not present in the series of 'echoed' consonants. Cynghanedd draws appears in this line from R. Williams Parry:

Rhowch wedd wen / dan o(rchudd iâ
["Place a white face under a veil of ice"]

Here the consonant sequence {Rh Ch Dd [stress] [semivowel]} is repeated with different stressed vowels (short ⟨e⟩ and long ⟨â⟩). The ⟨n⟩ at the end of the first half plays no part in the cynghanedd: the line-final word iâ instead ends in a vowel; if this word also ended in an ⟨n⟩, there would be generic rhyme between the two words, which is not permitted in cynghanedd.

The {D N} of the word dan is also not part of the cynghanedd: this is the difference between cynghanedd groes and cynghanedd draws.

=== Classification ===
Cynghanedd draws lines can be classified into three types in the same way as cynghanedd groes according to the stress of the syllable which ends each half.

==== Type 1 ====
Type 1 has a stressed syllable at the end of each half. In this type, the consonant matching continues only as far as the stressed vowel, as in the two examples above. However, it may continue after the stressed vowel if the final consonants are different:

Galw ar fun, / ddyn (gŵyl, i'r fainc
["I called the maid, a bashful girl, to the bench"]

There may be any number of unmatched consonants in the central part of the line, as long as the initial sequence of consonants and accent is repeated. An extreme possibility is the following line of Dafydd ap Gwilym's The Girls of Llanbadarn, where only one syllable is involved:

Pla / ar holl ferched y (plwyf!
["A plague on all the girls of the parish!"]

This kind, in which only the first and last syllables have matching consonants, is known as cynghanedd draws fantach ["gap-toothed cynghanedd draws"].

In cynghanedd draws in a seven-syllable line the caesura usually comes after the second or the third syllable, but it may sometimes come after the first syllable (see example above). It only very rarely comes after the fourth, as in this line by Tudur Aled:

Gwae fi na bawn / dan (gefn bedd
["Woe is me that I am not beneath (the back of) the grave!"]

==== Type 2 ====
In type 2 both halves end in a polysyllable stressed on the penultimate. Here the consonant-matching continues after the stressed vowel, and can even continue to the end of the word, provided the very last consonant is different, as in this line of Dafydd ap Gwilym in praise of the month of May:

Cennad / nawugain (cynnadl
["Messenger of ninescore trysts"]

When the word at the end of a half-line starts with a vowel, even a single consonant following the stressed vowel may be enough to satisfy the rules of cynghanedd draws, as in this line describing a woodcock:

O adar / gaeaf (ydiw
["It is one of the birds of winter"]

Theoretically, if the stressed vowel has no consonant either before or after it, a cynghanedd draws could occur without any consonants (but in practice this rarely if ever happens):

Ieuanc / a hael yw (Owain
["Owain is young and generous"]

==== Type 3 ====
In type 3, which is the least common, a stressed ending is matched against an unstressed one. The consonant after the stressed vowel is required for the cynghanedd:

Dwg hyn / i’r ferch (deg gynnau.
["Take this to the fair girl (we saw) earlier."]

In this example ⟨g h⟩ and ⟨g g⟩ are both pronounced voicelessly as [k].

=== Pronunciation of consonants ===
As noted above, the pronunciation takes precedence over spelling. In the following line from Dafydd ap Gwilym, ⟨ph⟩ corresponds to ⟨ff⟩, and ⟨d+t⟩ corresponds to ⟨d+d⟩:

A'i phryd teg / yn lle'r (ffrwd dau.
["And her fair form in place of your flood"]

The separate letters ⟨r⟩ and ⟨h⟩ can correspond to voiceless ⟨rh⟩, as in this line by Dafydd ap Gwilym:

Ar hyd / y du grimp (a' r rhew
["Along the dark ridge and the ice"]

In medieval poetry, ac "and" and nac "nor" were always pronounced with /g/, so these lines from Dafydd ap Gwilym have the consonant patterns {G [stress] D} and {G [stress] N}:

Ac adar / aml ar (goedydd
["And many birds on trees"]

Nac unnos / o For(gannwg
["Nor (will I go) a single night from Glamorgan"]

=== Cymeriad cynghaneddol ===
Occasionally cynghanedd draws can apparently spread over two lines, as in the couplet below from Dafydd ap Gwilym, addressed to the River Dyfi, where the pattern {M Ll [stress] Dd} is repeated in the first part of the second line. In addition the first line has a shortened cynghanedd lusg and the second has cynghanedd sain:

Ni' m lladdo / rhyfel / gelyn
O' m lluddiud / i dud / y dyn
["An enemy's war will not slay me...
If you prevent me from (reaching) that girl's land"]

This type, where consonants from the first line of couplet are echoed in the second line, is known as cymeriad cynghaneddol.

== Cynghanedd braidd gyffwrdd ==
In another type of consonantal cynghanedd, the cynghanedd applies in the centre of the line only. This is called cynghanedd braidd gyffwrdd (or gyfwrdd) ["cynghanedd barely touching"]. It was common in earlier Welsh poetry but is not often found in Dafydd ap Gwilym and later poets. Occasionally there may be echo alliteration in the remaining parts of the line, as in the examples below. The following two lines both come from the same poem by Dafydd ap Gwilym in which he describes how while making love outdoors in winter he and his girlfriend were disturbed by a woodcock:

A fu ddim, / ddamwain breiddfyw
["Was there ever anything, season barely living"]

Gwnaeth fraw, / frychleidr anghyfrwys
["It caused a fright, the unsubtle speckled thief"]

== Cynghanedd sain ==
In cynghanedd sain ("sound-harmony") the line is divided into three sections instead of two; the first and second sections rhyme, and the second and third are linked by alliteration. The line usually has three accents, one on each rhyming word.

=== Simple types ===
The simplest kind of cynghanedd sain is when only one consonant is involved in alliteration between sections 2 and 3, the other consonants being ignored, as in this line by Dafydd ap Gwilym:

Lewpart / a dart / yn ei din
["A leopard with a dart in its backside"]

Here the listener hears -art d- -art d- with alternating rhyme and alliteration.

Usually the alliterating consonant immediately precedes the stressed vowel section 2 as shown above. Less commonly the first alliterating consonant accompanies an earlier unstressed vowel, as in the following example:

Fal fflamau / canhwyllau / cwyr
["Like flames of candles of wax"]

This kind has sometimes been regarded as less pleasing by some scholars. Morris-Jones calls it cynghanedd sain drosgl (from trwsgl "awkward, clumsy"). However, it is allowed under the current official rules for cynghanedd.

=== More complex types ===
A more complex kind is where the consonants both before and after the stressed vowel in section 2 are repeated in section 3, in the same way as in cynghanedd groes or cynghanedd draws. In the following example, by Dafydd ap Gwilym, the pattern {H [stress] L} is repeated:

Yr wybrwynt / helynt / hylaw
["O wind of the sky, whose course is free"]

Another example, with {Ll [stress] Dd}, is:

Dyddgu / â'r gwallt lliwddu / lleddf
["Dyddgu with her smooth black hair"]

The following line repeats the three consonants {H [stress] DR}:

Ef / yw gwynt hydref / hoedran
["That is the autumn wind of sadness"]

The following example repeats the three consonants {F [stress] RF}. It also shows that ⟨u⟩ and ⟨y⟩ in a word-final syllable can rhyme:

A chof fydd / Forfudd / f'eurferch
["And I will remember Morfudd my golden girl"]

The following line has a more complete cynghanedd of four consonants {C R Dd [stress] R} between section 2 and section 3. In addition there is alliteration of {C} linking all three sections:

Cywion / cerddorion / caer dderw
["Chicks, musicians of the castle of oak"]

Occasionally, the rhyme can cover two syllables:

Caredig / urddedig / ddadl
["Affectionate dignified conversation"]

In the commonly used cywydd metre there is a requirement that one of the two lines of couplet must end with a stressed rhyming syllable and the other with an unstressed one. However, this rule does not apply to internal rhymes in cynghanedd sain, which can be stressed or unstressed at will. Another difference with cynghanedd groes is that in the second and third sections, a polysyllable is often followed by a monosyllable, which is not allowed in cynghanedd groes.

Cynghanedd sain can be classified in the same way as cynghanedd groes by the accent of the last syllable in sections 2 and 3. As the above examples show, in contrast with cynghanedd groes, the fourth possibility, type 4, with an unstressed ending in section 2 and stressed ending in section 3, is common. This is known as cynghanedd sain anghytbwys ddyrchafedig ["unbalanced, raised up cynghanedd sain"].

The least common type is type 3, with a stressed ending in the first half and an unstressed one in the second, as in this line where Dafydd addresses the wave on a river:

Tro drachefn, / trefn / trychanrhwyd
["Turn back, home of three hundred nets!"]

=== Linked cynghanedd sain ===
Just as with cynghanedd groes, a consonant can be borrowed from the end of the previous part of the line to make up the pattern of consonants in the following part. So in this line by Dafydd ap Gwilym, the consonant pattern {F [stress] N} in -f ann- in part 3 is made by borrowing the ⟨f⟩ from the end of part two:

Oni chaf / fwynaf_/_annerch
["If I do not receive a most gentle greeting"]

In the following line, the final word needs ⟨n⟩ from the end of brynhawn to make the double alliteration {NH [stress]}. The word brynhawn "afternoon" is stressed on the second syllable, so that in both words the letters ⟨nh⟩ come before the stress:

Rhwng gras a dawn / brynhawn_/_hwyr
["By grace and the gift of a late afternoon"]

Similarly in the following line, the first in Dafydd's poem Summer, the consonant pattern {L [stress] Dd} in -l_eidd- and -l_Add- is made each time using the last letter of the previous section:

Gwae ni, hil _/_eiddil _/_Addaf
["Woe to us, feeble race of Adam"]

This implies that there is no pause at the place marked "/" following the rhyming syllable when the poem is sung or recited.

=== Irregular types ===
More complex types of cynghanedd sain are possible. Occasionally there is consonant echoing between the first and second parts, as well as alliteration between the second and third. An example this line by Dafydd ap Gwilym:

Digrif fydd, / mau grefydd / grill!
["Pleasant it will be – birdsong is my worship! –"]

Sometimes the line can be divided into four distinct sections, with rhyme between the first and third parts, and consonantal cynghanedd between the second and fourth. This is known as cynghanedd sain gadwynog. In this type there are four accents in the line, instead of three. The following examples come from Dafydd ap Gwilym:

Gofiniad / braisg / geimiad / brwysg
["The question of a strong, fierce hero."]

Lleuad las / gron, / gwmpas / graen
["A round blue moon, a gloomy circle"]

There are also some lines which could be read as both cynghanedd sain and cynghanedd draws; this kind is known as cynghanedd seindraws. For example:

Yno y gwŷs / difwyno gwedd
["There they know how to make a face ugly"]

The following line, from Dafydd ap Gwilym's Y Cleddyf ["The Sword"], has double cynghanedd sain, with two rhymes (ain ... ain, wydr ... wydr) and two alliterations (br ... br, tr ... tr):

Coelfain brain brwydr, / treiglgrwydr trin
["Rewarder of crows of battle, flowing interwoven pattern of war"]

The following, the first line of Dafydd ap Gwilym's Y Deildy ["The Leaf-House"], is classified as cynghanedd sain bengoll ["headless cynghanedd sain"], because the last part of the line is not part of the pattern. The second and third part of the line have the pattern {F [stress] R Dd}. The consonant pattern {F R} is heard again in the fourth section but with a different stress:

Heirdd / feirdd / f'eurddyn, / diledfeirw
["Handsome poets, my golden girl, and lively ones"]

== Cynghanedd lusg ==
=== Normal rhymes ===
In cynghanedd lusg ("drag-harmony" or "trailing cynghanedd") (Welsh pronunciation: [lɨsk] the final syllable of a word earlier in the line makes full rhyme (i.e. including the vowel and consonant or consonants after the vowel) with the penultimate syllable of the line-final polysyllabic word (i.e. the main stressed syllable of the second half). Usually the consonant preceding the rhyming syllable is not involved in the rhyme. Because llusg is regarded as a rather simple form of cynghanedd, it is regularly found only in the first line of a couplet, the second line having one of the more complex types. Thus in the following couplet from Dafydd ap Gwilym, the first line is llusg and the second sain:

A buaned / y rhedy
Yr awr hon / dros y fron / fry
["And how quickly you run
at this hour across the hilltop above!"].

The first rhyme can also be in a monosyllable, and thus making both rhyming syllables stressed:

A dwyn sôn / mewn afonydd
["And bringing noise in rivers"]

The first rhyming syllable is usually the 3rd or 4th in the line. Sometimes, however, the first rhyme can come in the second syllable of the line:

Nid call / i fardd arallwlad
["It is not wise for a poet from another land"]

Ei flew / fal sidan newydd
["His coat like new silk"]

A rhyme in the first syllable is possible but uncommon:

Rhaid / oedd ym fedru peidiaw
["It might be necessary for me to renounce (this behaviour)"]

It is also possible for the two rhymes to be in consecutive syllables, both in the second half of the line:

Oni'th gaf / er cerdd erddrym[
"If I don't win you with my noble song"]

As these examples show, the first rhyming syllable can be stressed or unstressed, but the second one is always stressed.

It has been suggested that the name llusg ["dragging" or "lingering"] was perhaps given because when singing the bards would emphasise the rhyming syllable by lingering on it.

=== Rhymes with wy ===
Cynghanedd lusg can be used, as in the examples below, to show that in a word like wyneb ["face"] the original pronunciation of wy was [ʊɨ] not [wɨ] as it is often pronounced today.

Mi a'th gaf, / addwyn wyneb
["It is I who shall win you, gentle-faced (girl)"]

Amlwg fydd trwyn / ar wyneb
["Plain is a nose on a face"]

=== Rhymes with ai/ei and eu/au ===
Since ⟨ai⟩ in a final syllable of a word becomes ⟨ei⟩ in a penultimate syllable (for example, dail ["leaves"] vs. deilen ["a leaf"]), ⟨ai⟩ in a word-final syllable is considered to rhyme with ⟨ei⟩ in a penultimate one, as in this line by Dafydd ap Gwilym:

Draean noswaith / hyd neithwyr
["(I did not sleep) even a third of a night until last night"]

Another example is:

Ceiliog bronfraith / cyweithias
["A sociable male thrush"]

Similarly, since ⟨au⟩ in a final syllable becomes ⟨eu⟩ in a penultimate one (e.g. haul ["sun"] vs. heulog ["sunny"]), a final syllable with ⟨au⟩ rhymes with ⟨eu⟩ in a penultimate one:

Ac yntau / a ddechreuawdd
["And it was he who began"]

Similarly, ⟨y⟩ (pronounced [ɨ]) in a final syllable rhymes with ⟨y⟩ (pronounced [ə]) in a penultimate one:

Ai hir gennyd / yr ydwyd?
["Is it long that you have been longing?"]

Fy ngwas gwych, / ni'th fradychir
["My fine servant, you will not be betrayed"]

Some authors, however, regard the rhyming of the two pronunciations of ⟨y⟩ as incorrect, and after the time of Dafydd ap Gwilym it was mostly avoided.

This kind of near-rhyming is called llusg wyrdro by some authors.

== Cynghanedd in other metres ==
=== Englyn unodl union ===
In some metres, the consonants in a word or words at the end of a line are echoed at the beginning or in the middle of the following line. This is usual in the first two lines of the commonly used four-line stanza englyn unodl union. These first two lines (of 10 syllables + 6) are made of a verse form known as toddaid byr. The third and fourth lines (of 7 syllables + 7) are a normal cywydd couplet.

In the stanza below, the first englyn of a long poem by Dafydd ap Gwilym in praise of a certain rood-cross in Carmarthen, the first eight syllables of the first line contain a cynghanedd sain, with rhymes -erth ... -erth and alliteration of ⟨n⟩, but it does not continue to the end of the line.

The ending of the line together with part of the second line make a kind of cynghanedd draws, with the consonantal pattern {T R [stress] S W R} repeated in the following line. This type of cynghanedd, where the consonant pattern at the end of one line is echoed before the caesura in the following line, is known as cynghanedd gyrch.

The third and fourth lines display a normal cynghanedd groes and cynghanedd sain respectively, exactly as in a cywydd couplet.

The sixth syllable of line 1 rhymes with the final syllable of lines 2, 3, and 4. Finally, lines 1, 3, and 4 are linked by the same initial consonants ⟨cr-⟩, a feature known as cymeriad llythrennol.

Cryf aberth / yw nerth, / nid yn aer /—treiswyr
Eithr mywn trawswyrth / didaer,
Crair mawrglod, / croywrym eirglaer,
Crog bedwarban / o gan / Gaer.
["Strong sacrifice is the strength, not in oppressors' battle
but in gentle [yet] powerful miracle;
highly-praised renowned holy relic, pure its vigour,
of the four-pointed rood from white Caer."]

The remaining stanzas of the poem all follow a similar pattern of cynghanedd.

This particular type of englyn ["short stanza"], consisting of lines of 10, 6, 7, 7 syllables, is known as englyn unodl union ["straight single-rhymed stanza"]. The word at the end of line 1, following the dash, is known as the gair cyrch. The gair cyrch either rhymes, or has consonantal cynghanedd, with the last word before the caesura in line 2; but in a toddaid byr (as found in the first two lines of an englyn unodl union) consonantal cynghanedd is usual. The end of the second line has no cynghanedd.

=== Toddaid ===
In those metres (such as the toddaid metre) which are formed using the longer 19-syllable toddaid, the gair cyrch is linked to the centre of the second line by rhyme instead of consonance. In this case the second line has a full cynghanedd, either cynghanedd sain or cynghanedd groes. At the same time, since the gair cyrch rhymes with the first section of the second line, everything from the gair cyrch to the end of line 2 can be considered to be an extended cynghanedd sain.

In the following toddaid describing a rival poet in unflattering terms, in a display of virtuosity Dafydd ap Gwilym has used double cynghanedd sain in line 1 as far as the dash, and cynghanedd sain in line 2. The ⟨d-h⟩ of d-héol matches the ⟨t⟩ of téyrn, making a consonantal pattern {Rh T [stress]} in each of the last two sections of the line:

Rhugn / sugn / soeg / gogoeg / gegyrn,––rhwthgynf ol,
Rhyf ol / rhwd heol, / nid rhyw tëyrn.
["Noise of sucking of the dregs of empty crab-apples, belly like a big chisel,
grown fat on the muck of roads, no princely stock."]

== Frequency ==
Cynghanedd lusg is less common than the other three types of cynghanedd. Typically in most of Dafydd ap Gwilym’s cywyddau the proportion of cynghanedd sain is over 30%, with the two consonantal cynganeddion accounting for about 60%, and llusg less than 10%.

However, the exact proportions vary from poem to poem. For example, Dafydd ap Gwilym's poem Y Ffenestr ["The Window"] with 52 lines has 19% croes, 38% traws, 33% sain, and 10% llusg; Trafferth Mewn Tafarn ["Trouble at a Tavern"] with 74 lines has 12% croes, 39% traws, 36% sain, and 12% llusg; while his poem Dagrau Serch ["Tears of Love"] of 50 lines has 38% croes, 36% traws, 16% sain, and 6% llusg, with one line of cynghanedd groes bengoll and one line without cynghanedd.

Later poets tended to use croes and traws more frequently than Dafydd. From the mid-15th century onwards, the proportion of cynghanedd sain tends to be much smaller than in the 14th century. For example, an analysis of the cywyddau of the 16th-century poet Huw ap Dafydd ap Llywelyn ap Madog calculates that he used 83% croes, 7% traws, 9% sain and 1.6% llusg. Similarly, an analysis of the 7-syllable lines in the englynion of William Llŷn (16th century) found 66% croes, 21% traws, 11% sain, and 1.6% llusg.

== Lines without cynghanedd ==
Most of Dafydd's poems have cynghanedd in every line, or nearly every line. But there are some exceptions. For example, Y Cwt Gwyddau ["The Goose Shed"] has 11% croes, 18% traws, 34% sain, no cynghanedd lusg at all, and has 16 lines (36%) with no cynghanedd. Merched Llanbadarn ["The Girls of Llanbadarn"] similarly has 19 lines (43%) without cynghanedd. In this last poem, several of the lines with no cynghanedd are used in the part where two girls are gossiping about Dafydd in church. Like llusg, lines without cynghanedd are generally found in the first line of a couplet.

There was also an early form of the cywydd metre called traethodl. This was written in couplets and had seven syllables per line, but with no cynghanedd. The rule about alternating stressed and unstressed rhyming syllables was also less strict. Dafydd's poem Y Bardd a'r Brawd Llwyd ["The Poet and the Greyfriar"] is entirely written in this metre. After the 14th century, lines without cynghanedd are no longer found.

Lines without cynghanedd in Welsh are called digynghanedd.

== Cynghanedd in early poetry ==
Writing in 1188, Gerald of Wales notes the delight Welsh people take in word-play (Latin annominatio):

More than any other figure they delight in alliteration, and especially that which links together the initial letters or syllables of words. The two peoples, English and Welsh, make such play with this literary device when they are trying to speak elegantly, that any pronouncement is condemned as rough and uncouth if it is not so polished and adorned. Here are two examples in Welsh:

Dychaun Dyu da dy unic.
["God can provide for the lonely man"]

Erbyn dibuilh puilh paraut.
["Behave prudently in the face of a frenzied attack."]

The first example shows simple word-initial alliteration; the second is cynghanedd sain.

In very early poetry, alliteration tended far more to be merely initial, and there was only a loose relationship, if any, between alliteration and rhyme. An example of a line with word-initial alliteration from the 7th century is:

Llath ar ei ysgwydd, llory yn ei law
["A staff on his shoulder, a club in his hand."]

By the 12th century, alliteration and rhyme were found in nearly every line. A study of the 7-syllable lines of Cynddelw (12th century) shows that more than half of them have alliteration without internal rhyme, and nearly half of them have internal rhyme, often with alliteration in addition. Only two lines out of 500 were without any decoration at all. However, the alliterative patterns usually differ from those of the later period. For example, very often alliteration does not cover the whole of a line, but omits the beginning of the verse (gwreiddgoll ["lacking its root"]) or the end (pengoll ["lacking its head"]) or both (cynghanedd braidd gyffwrdd ["barely touching harmony"]):

Cedwyr balch, bwlch ei ysgwyd
["Proud warriors, with their shields dented"]

Lines with internal rhyme also do not always conform to the later rules of cynghanedd sain. For example, the following line has three rhyming syllables, rather than two, and bonus alliteration (gw- gw-):

Gwan wrth wan, gwaed luman liw
["Thrust against thrust, blood the colour of a banner"]

The poet and translator Tony Conran points out that there is a striking difference between the cynghanedd in the early poets and in the later ones, in that in the early period the function of rhyme and alliteration was to emphasise important words in the line or to contrast one with another, for example llath vs llory, balch vs bwlch in the examples above. But in later poets the alliteration often exists independently of the individual words. For example, in the following line by Tudur Aled (16th century), cited by Conran, word-initial ⟨ch⟩ in the first half is matched by ⟨ch⟩ at the end of a word in the second half, and ⟨ll⟩ in the middle of a word in the first half is matched by the same consonant at the beginning of a word in the second half, so that the alliteration does not emphasise any word or contrast one word with another:

Na choller hyn, / o' ch llaw rhawg
["Let this not be lost from your hand in future"]

== Internal rhyme in Breton ==
A form of cynghanedd lusg known as "internal rhyme" (Breton : klotennoù diabarzh, enklotennoù or kenganez) was frequently used in Middle Breton, between the 12th and 17th centuries, in poetry, like in Pemzec Leuenez Maria or in the sonnet from Français Moeam, and theatre like in lots of misterioù, religious pieces, such as Buhez Sante Barba. Two of the oldest works with internal rhymes are the Ivonet Omnes verses, which seem to be an old Breton lay and Dialog etre Arzuz Roe d'an bretounet ha Guiclaff, a prophetic text in dialogues.

This is an extract of An Dialog etre Arzur Roe d'an Bretounet ha Guynglaff (48-49 verses) :

An tut a ilis diguyset
An douar fallaff a roy guellaff et

Though it isn't used as much as cynghanedd in Modern Welsh, some authors have published some work using this internal rhyme in poetry (Alan Botrel) or in the form of a lay like Lae Izold by Paskal Tabuteau.

== Bibliography ==
- Crawford, T. D. (1985). "The Englynion of Dafydd ap Gwilym". Études Celtiques. 22: 235–285.
- Crawford, T. D. (1990). "The Toddaid and Gwawdodyn byr in the poetry of Dafydd ap Gwilym, with an Appendix concerning the Traethodlau attributed to him". Études Celtiques. 27: 301–336. doi:10.3406/ecelt.1990.1935.
- Ernault, Emile L'ancien Vers breton, Honoré Champion, 1912; republished by Brud Nevez, 1991 ISBN 978-2-86775-103-5
- Hopwood, Mererid (2004), Singing in Chains: Listening to Welsh Verse. Llandysul: Gomer. ISBN 1-84323-402-5.
- Lloyd, D.M. (1968). "Some metrical features in Gogynfeirdd poetry". Studia Celtica 3, 38–46.
- Llwyd, Alan (2007), Anghenion y Gynghanedd. Barddas. ISBN 978-1-900437-98-1
- Morris-Jones, John (1925). Cerdd Dafod. Oxford. (in Welsh)
- Myrddin ap Dafydd Clywed Cynghanedd: cwrs cerdd dafod (in Welsh)
- Parry, Thomas (1961). "The Welsh metrical treatise attributed to Einion Offeriad". (British Academy documents)

== See also ==
- Traditional Welsh poetic metres
- Englyn
- Cywydd
- The Seagull (poem)
