= Awdl =

Welsh poetic form

In Welsh poetry, an awdl (pronounced [ˈau̯dl̩]) is a long poem in strict metre (i.e. cynghanedd). Originally, an awdl could be a relatively short poem unified by its use of a single end-rhyme (the word is related to odl, "rhyme"), using cynghanedd; such early awdlau are associated with the Cynfeirdd such as Aneirin and Taliesin as found in collections such as the Book of Taliesin, the Black Book of Carmarthen, the Hendregadredd Manuscript or The Red Book of Hergest. By the nineteenth century however it came to its modern definition as a long poem using at least two of the twenty-four recognised "official" strict forms (without the single end-rhyme).

Each year at the National Eisteddfod the bardic chair is awarded for the awdl judged worthiest; this competition is the most famous and prestigious in the Eisteddfod, and perceived to be the most difficult.

== History ==
Awdlau in the early period are to be distinguished from Englynion, which are short, three or four-line stanzas. Since the recorded beginnings, awdlau were highly ornamental, and the forms permitted became stricter and stricter until the high Middle Ages. The 11th –13th centuries saw the royal court poets (Poets of the Princes) develop the art to a remarkable level of skill and accomplishment. After the extinction of Welsh royalty with the death of Llywelyn ap Gruffudd in 1282, standardisation and codification of the rules of professional poetry led to recognition of 24 strict metres, each of which must use cynghanedd. By this period, the englyn metres as well as the cywydd metres were included within the 24, and the term awdl simpliciter became used for any long poem composed in metres chosen from the permitted range, with end-rhyme staying constant within individual sections of the poem. Among those known to have used the form in the early 17th century was Dafydd Llwyd Mathau in 1611.

== Prestige ==
Such poems are judged to be among the finest work a poet can aim to produce. Prizes are given at eisteddfodau for the best awdl, the most lauded being that of chair at the National Eisteddfod of Wales, held each year in August. While 19th-century awdlau could run to thousands of lines, it is unusual to find such extensive pieces these days; the National Eisteddfod limits competitors to a few hundred lines.

Perhaps the best known early awdl is an apocalyptic elegy by Gruffudd ab yr Ynad Coch, marking the death in 1282 of Llywelyn ap Gruffudd. Well known 20th-century examples include Ymadawiad Arthur by T. Gwynn Jones, and Yr Arwr, by Hedd Wyn, which won the Eisteddfod chair in 1917 shortly after the death of its author in the First World War.
