= Gruffudd ab yr Ynad Coch =

Welsh poet

Gruffudd ab yr Ynad Coch (fl. 1277–1282) was a Welsh court poet.

Gruffudd composed a number of poems on the theme of religion. His greatest fame however, lies with his moving elegy for Llywelyn ap Gruffudd, Prince of Wales, which is widely considered to be one of the finest poems in Welsh and medieval European literature.

== See also ==
Gruffudd ab Yr Ynad Coch at Wikisource
