= Tudur Aled =

Welsh poet

Tudur Aled (c. 1465 – 1525) was a late medieval Welsh poet, born in Llansannan, Denbighshire (Sir Ddinbych). He is regarded as a master of cynghanedd.

== Beginnings ==
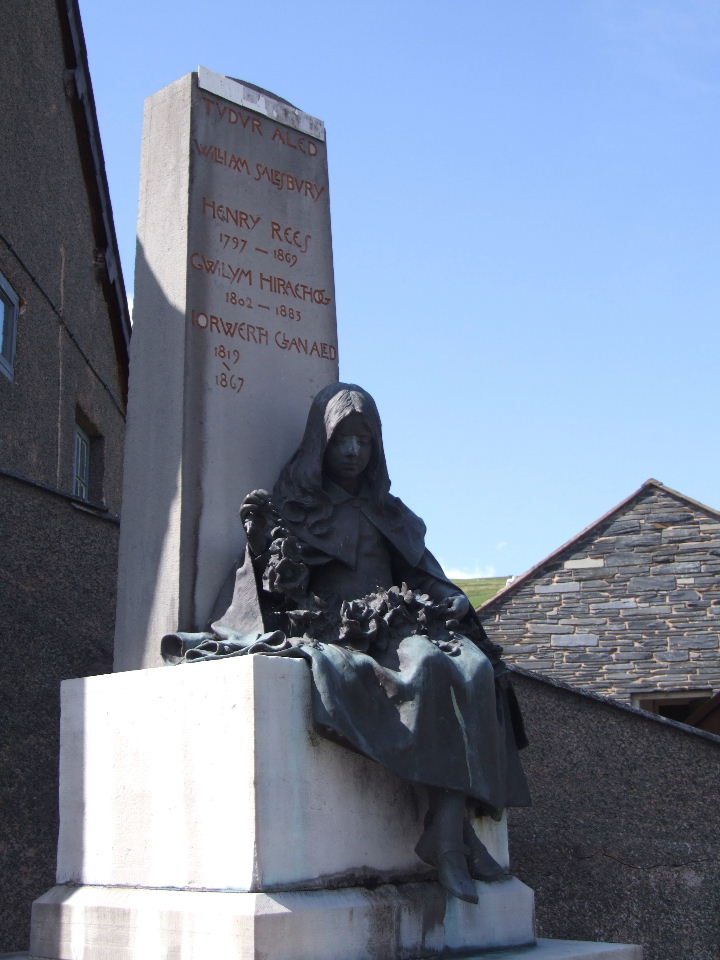
Monument known as "Yr Eneth" ("The Girl") in Llansannan, Conwy, North Wales. It commemorates Tudur Aled, poet (died c. 1526). William Salesbury, scholar and linguist (born c.1520) and the poets and preachers Henry Rees, Gwilym Hiraethog and Iorwerth Glan Aled. They were all born in the parish of Llansannan.

Tudur Aled was born c. 1465 in Llansannan, in what is now Denbighshire. It is likely that his father's name was Robert and his grandfather's name was Ithel, and that he was of noble stock. Tudur Aled was a Latin Catholic. Research indicates that his paternal line were descendants of Llywelyn Chwith and that he was related to the Lloyd family of Chwibren, considered to be descendents of Hedd Molwynog (or Ab Alunawg), chief of one of the fifteen tribes of North Wales.

It is uncertain when Tudur Aled started to write poetry. A remark by him in his elegy to Dafydd ab Edmwnd suggests that Tudur Aled was his pupil. There are firm references to the Battle of Blackheath (1497). An allusion to the Battle of Bosworth Field (1485) has been suspected in his cywydd to Sir William Gruffudd the Chamberlain. A reference in an elegy to him by Raff ap Robert suggests that he had a wife and a son, who was a priest.

== Reputation ==
Tudur Aled was himself a nobleman and one of the foremost Beirdd yr Uchelwyr (Poets of the Nobility). His main patrons were the Salisbury family of Dyffryn Clwyd, and Rhys ap Thomas. He was one of the instigators of the Caerwys eisteddfod of 1523.

During his final illness, Tudur Aled took the habit of Order of St. Francis. He died in Carmarthen, where he was buried in the Brothers' Court. The event was marked by elegies written by several of his fellow Welsh poets. He was known particularly for poems in honour of secular and religious noblemen. His work also reflects the changes at the beginning of the 16th century, which were threatening the future of the bardic system.

== Bibliography ==
- Thomas Gwynn Jones (ed.), Gwaith Tudur Aled (Cardiff, 1926). The standard collected edition of Tudur's poetry.
