= Cywydd =

Metrical forms in traditional Welsh poetry

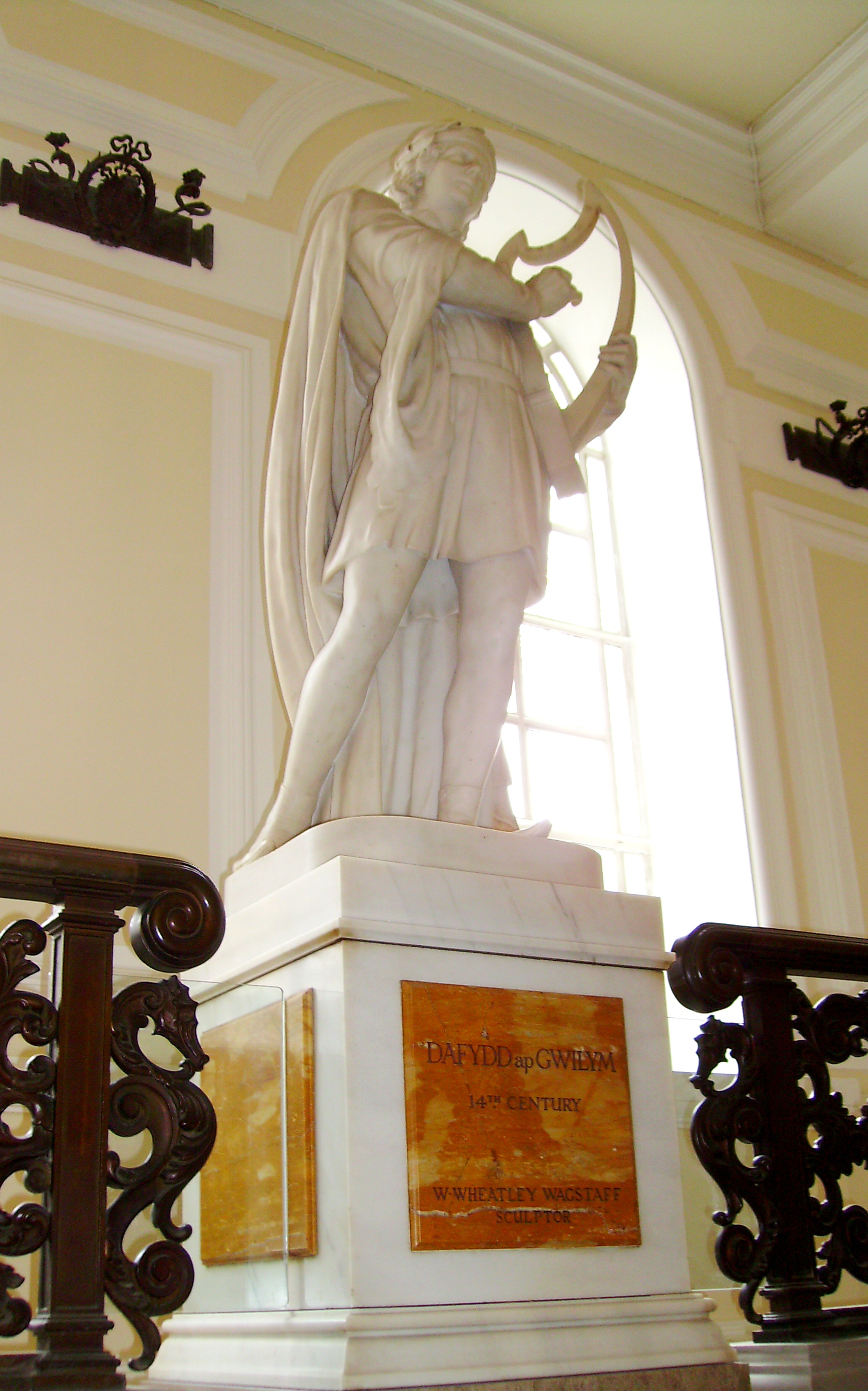
Dafydd ap Gwilym, one of the pioneers of cywydd (statue in Cardiff City Hall)

The cywydd (IPA: [ˈkəwɨ̞ð]; plural cywyddau IPA: [kə'wəðe]) is one of the most important metrical forms in traditional Welsh poetry (cerdd dafod).

There are a variety of forms of the cywydd, but the word on its own is generally used to refer to the cywydd deuair hirion ("long-lined couplet") as it is by far the most common type.

The first recorded examples of the cywydd date from the early 14th century, when it is believed to have been developed. This was the favourite metre of the Poets of the Nobility from the 14th to 16th centuries and is still used in the 21st.

In Bardic Grammar (c.1350–1400), Einion Offeiriad, in addition to the cywydd deuair hirion, refers to three other types: cywydd deuair fyrion, cywydd llosgyrnog, and awdl-gywydd. All four types occur in the list of the twenty-four traditional Welsh poetic meters adopted in the 15th century.

The name cywydd has no obvious etymology, but it is cognate with the Old Irish word cubaid, meaning "harmonious" or "rhyming".

== Cywydd deuair hirion ==
The cywydd deuair hirion ("cywydd of long couplets") is the most commonly used of the four cywydd metres and often referred to simply as cywydd. Apart from three couplets in an archaic style in Einion Offeiriad's description of the 24 metres, no lines in this metre survive from before the time of Dafydd ap Gwilym (fl. c. 1340–70), who used it extensively.

The metre consists of a series of rhyming couplets formed of seven-syllable lines. Usually each line is also decorated with cynghanedd, the poet being free to use the four different types in random order (but if cynghanedd lusg is used, it is generally found only in the first line of a couplet). There is no rule about how many couplets there must be in a cywydd.

Every couplet has end-rhyme. The two end-rhymes of a couplet must be either stressed and unstressed, or unstressed and stressed. The rhyme may vary from couplet to couplet, or may remain the same. In lines with cynghanedd sain or cynghanedd lusg there is also internal rhyme. In some poems, as well as rhyme at the end of the lines, there is also cymeriad cynganeddol at the beginning of lines, linking two lines of a couplet, or several couplets, by their initial letters.

In most lines there is a break or caesura (gorffwysfa ("pausing place")) near the centre of the line, usually after the third syllable, but sometimes after the 2nd or 4th. In cynghanedd draws it may sometimes come after the first syllable.

A cywydd deuair hirion has two principal accents (namely, on the word before the caesura and on the word before the end of the line), and also either one or two secondary accents. If there is only one secondary accent, it usually falls in the second half of the line, e.g. Dy gréfydd / dèg oréuferch ("Your religion, fair best of maids"). A line with cynghanedd sain usually has three accents, e.g. Pówdrau / yn nỳsglau / y náill ("Spices in the dishes of the others"), but occasionally four. When there are four accents in consonantal cynghanedd, there are two in each half of the line: Dàgrau óer, / dagèrau iâ ("Cold tears, daggers of ice").

The early masters of cywydd deuair hirion were Dafydd ap Gwilym, Llywelyn Goch ap Meurig Hen, Gruffudd Gryg and Iolo Goch in the 14th century; Guto'r Glyn, Dafydd Nanmor and Lewys Glyn Cothi in the 15th century; and Tudur Aled, Lewys Môn and Wiliam Llŷn in the 16th.

The metre experienced a revival in the 18th century, thanks largely to the work of poets such as Goronwy Owen and Lewis Morris (1701–1765). Iolo Morganwg was also capable of composing excellent cywyddau, although he attributed many of them to medieval poets like Dafydd ap Gwilym. Although the cywydd lost ground to the Eisteddfod awdl and new forms of lyric poetry in the 19th century, it regained its prestige in the 20th century and remains a popular metre among contemporary poets writing in the strict metres. It is one of the metres prescribed for the Chair competition at the National Eisteddfod.

=== Examples ===
The following example shows the first three couplets of the 14th-century poet Dafydd ap Gwilym's poem Sarhau ei Was ("Insulting his Servant"), a work of 33 couplets describing Dafydd's unsuccessful attempt to chat up a girl. The different types of cynghanedd are noted as L = llusg, S = sain, T = traws, C = croes.

Gŵyl Bedr / y bûm yn edrych (L)
Yn Rhosyr, / lle aml gwŷr / gwych, (S)
Ar drwsiad / pobl, aur drysor, (T)
A gallu Môn / gerllaw môr. (C)
Yno'dd oedd, / haul Wynedd yw, (T)
Yn danrhwysg, / Enid unrhyw. (C)

("It was on St Peter's Festival that I was looking
in Rhosyr (Newborough), where there are lots of excellent men,
at people's attire, a golden treasure,
and the throng of Mon (Anglesey), beside the sea.
There there was – she is the Sun of Gwynedd –
in the splendour of fire, one like Enid.")

Most lines contain a caesura (gorffwysfa ("pausing place")), dividing the line into two. (But in the case of cynghanedd sain there are three sections.) Often, but not always, there is a break in sense at the caesura.

In the case of cynghanedd groes, most or all of the consonants in the first half of the line (except the very last) are echoed in the same order in the second half. With cynghanedd draws most or all of the consonants in the first half are echoed at the end of the line, but there are one or more consonants in the middle of the line which are unmatched.

The cynghanedd groes lines here are not all of exactly the same type; for example, in line 4 two monosyllables are contrasted by their consonance (Môn...môr), but in line 6 the half-lines end in two disyllables (dánrhwysg...(d)únrhyw) with their accent on the penultimate syllable, creating a different rhythm to the line. Similarly the two cynghanedd draws lines (3 and 5) are of different types.

Not every line of Dafydd ap Gwilym's cywyddau contains cynghanedd. In some, such as Merched Llanbadarn ("The Girls of Llanbadarn"), as many as 43% of lines have no cynghanedd. There is even one poem, Y Bardd a'r Brawd Llwyd ("The Poet and the Greyfriar"), which contains no cynghanedd at all, but is written in a metre called traethodl, which is believed to be a popular precursor of the cwywdd metre. This metre is more or less identical to cywydd deuair hirion except that it has no cynghanedd and the rules for rhyme are less strict.

In the 15th century the style of cynghanedd became stricter. Cynghanedd lusg and sain became less common, and the proportion of cynghanedd groes went up. The following is the start of a poem by Tudur Aled (c. 1465-1625) requesting a horse for his patron from the Abbot of Aberconwy:

Gydag un / a geidw Gwynedd (C)
Y cawn ar lan / Conwy’r wledd (C)
Abad / tros wythwlad / y sydd (S)
Aberconwy / barc gwinwydd (C)
Arglwydd / yn rhoi gwledd yn rhad (C)
Arfer ddwbl / ar fwrdd abad (C)
Powdrau / yn nysglau / y naill (S)
A'r oraits / i rai eraill. (C)

("With one who keeps Gwynedd
I shall have a feast on the banks of the Conwy.
An abbot ruling eight lands is he,
Aberconwy, park of vines,
a lord giving banquets freely,
a double custom on the table of an abbot,
spices in the dishes of some
and the oranges for some others.")

A cywydd couplet, complete with the usual cynghanedd, is also found in the second half of the commonly used four-line englyn unodl union (see Englyn).

== Cywydd deuair fyrion ==
The cywydd deuair fyrion or "cywydd of short couplets" is a less commonly used metre consisting of rhyming couplets of lines of four syllables each. The two lines are sometimes written side by side, and sometimes one above the other. The earliest examples had no cynghanedd but later on cynghanedd was added.

An example (but without cynghanedd) is the poem Anfon Adar yn Llateion ("Sending Birds as Love-Messengers") by Iolo Morganwg (1747–1826). This poem is written with the two lines of the couplet side by side. It begins:

Serch / y rhoddais // ar ddyn / feinais,
Hoen geirw / môr gwyllt, // bun ail / Esyllt
Ei thegwch / hi // bu'n saeth / imi.

("I gave my love to a slender girl,
the hue of foam of a wild sea, a maid who was a second Iseult;
her beauty was an arrow for me.")

The poem consists of 31 couplets in all. In each half of the couplet there are two accents, making four for the complete line.

A later example, mostly with cynghanedd, comes from part of a longer poem in various metres, called Salm i Famon ("Psalm to Mammon"), by John Morris-Jones.

O'i ged / wedi (L)
Ei thost / waith hi, (C)
Hwn / anfonodd (L)
Ei Fab / o'i fodd, (C)
I'w throi / i'w thref— (C)
Wiwdda / addef. (C)

("From His grace after
her bitter deed,
He sent
His Son of His free will
to turn her to her home,
a blessed confession.")

== Cywydd llosgyrnog ==
The cywydd llosgyrnog ("tailed cywydd") is formed of stanzas each of which consists of a group of two (sometimes three, or four) eight-syllable lines, followed by one seven-syllable line. The eight-syllable lines rhyme together and also rhyme with a word in the middle of the seven-syllable line. The seven-syllable line ends in a rhyme which is repeated at the end of each stanza throughout the poem. This final line is called the llosgwrn ("tail").

The metre is not commonly used. John Morris-Jones conjectured that it may have originated from Latin, since a similar metre was occasionally used for Latin hymns in the medieval period; though the rhyme scheme is Welsh.

The following example comes from an ode written by the 15th-century poet Dafydd Nanmor to illustrate all the 24 classical metres. Each line is decorated with cynghanedd groes:

A rhai gwrol / yn rhagori (C)
A rhoi o gaer, / a'i hegori, (C)
Aber Teifi / bort dwyfil. (C)

("And those valiant ones excelling,
and giving up the castle and opening it,
Aber Teifi (Cardigan), port of two thousand.")

There are no further verses in this metre in the poem, but the end-rhyme -il is repeated in the englyn which follows.

== Awdl-gywydd ==
The awdl-gywydd ("ode-cywydd") is very similar to the cywydd deuair hirion in that it has couplets made of seven-syllable lines, decorated with the usual cynghanedd. It differs only in its rhyme-scheme. The first line of each couplet rhymes with the word immediately before the caesura of the second line, while the end-rhyme of the second line is the same as the end rhyme of all the other second lines in the poem. Thus it is like an awdl in that the same rhyme (odl) continues throughout the poem.

An example is the poem of Gutun Owain (15th century) addressed to the Abbot of Valle Crucis Abbey. It begins:

Y Pab o'r Glyn, / pybyr glod (C)
Yw'n un nod / yn enwedig. (C)
Dafydd ddoeth, / dof i'w ddethol, (C)
Beuno'r ddôl, / heb un awr ddig. (C)

("The Pope of the Valley, enthusiastic praise
is our one aim especially.
Wise Dafydd, I come to choose him,
A Beuno of the meadow, without a single hour of anger.")

The poem has 23 couplets in all. The first line of a couplet can use any kind of cynghanedd, but the second line, in order to avoid the confusion of too many internal rhymes, always has either cynghanedd groes or cynghanedd draws (i.e. the types which involve consonants only), meaning that the end of the first line and the whole of the second line together form an extended cynghanedd sain in each couplet. There is no requirement for the rhymes to be stressed or unstressed.

Another example is the Awdl-gywydd i Ddewi Sant ("Awdl-Cywydd in praise of St David") by Lewys Glyn Cothi (15th century). It begins:

Mae ’mhwys, / mewn crwys, / lle croesant, (S)
Ar un sant / o’r ynys hon, (C)
Dewi gâr, / lle dug urael, (T)
Dogwael / o Geredigion. (T)

("My trust, in crosses – where they cross –
is in one saint of this island,
Dewi, cousin – where he wore fine linen –
of Dogfael from Ceredigion").

The poem has 16 couplets all rhyming in -on.

== See also ==
- Englyn
- Awdl
