= Einion Offeiriad =

Welsh poet and grammarian

Einion Offeiriad ("Einion the Priest") (died 1356) was a Welsh language poet and grammarian.

Einion lived in Ceredigion, where he was a chaplain to Sir Rhys ap Gruffudd ap Hywel ap Gruffudd ab Ednyfed Fychan, a wealthy nobleman. Amongst Einion's surviving poems is an awdl sung in praise of Sir Rhys ap Gruffydd.

Einion's fames lies primarily with his metrical grammar, Llyfr Cerddwriaeth, the earliest of its kind known in Welsh. Although written in Welsh it is partly an adaption of Latin grammars in use during the early Middle Ages, in particular those of Donatus and Priscianus. It provides a description of the twenty four metres of the cerdd dafod, how they should be composed, and a strict edict on proscribed faults. It also lays out the precedence for the subjects of praise: spiritual poetry in praise of God, Christ and the saints before temporal poetry in praise of the King and nobility.

== See also ==
- An introduction to the poetic metres can be found at Gwenllian's Poetry Primer
