= His Shadow =

Poem by Dafydd ap Gwilym

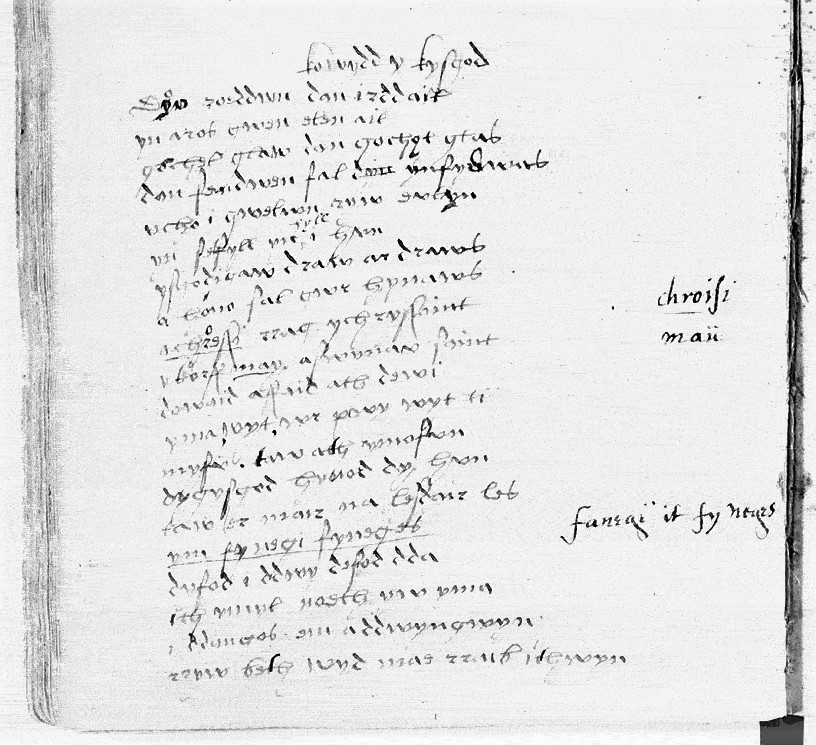
The opening lines of the poem in Llyfr Ficer Woking, a 16th-century manuscript (MS C 2.114) held in Cardiff Central Library

"His Shadow" (Welsh: Ei Gysgod) is a poem in the form of a cywydd by the 14th-century bard Dafydd ap Gwilym, widely considered the greatest of the Welsh poets. It relates a conversation in which the poet defends his character from the insinuations of his own shadow, and it parodies a popular medieval genre in which the Soul remonstrates with the Body. It has been argued that "His Shadow" was written towards the end of Daydd's poetic career. It was accepted in the 2007 edition of Dafydd ap Gwilym's poems by Dafydd Johnston et al. as a genuine work of his; previously, Thomas Parry had included it in his 1952 edition of Dafydd's works and in his Oxford Book of Welsh Verse (1962) as genuine, though in 1985 he expressed some doubts as to Dafydd's authorship.

== Summary ==
While awaiting a girl with whom he has made an assignation the poet is startled by an ugly apparition. On being challenged by the poet the apparition tells him it is his shadow, come to show him the sort of man he is. The poet protests, and in a series of insulting epithets reproaches the shadow with its sinister ugliness. It is a hunchbacked goat, a shepherd of goblins, a doltish pilgrim, a black friar in rags. The shadow reminds him that it knows him well. The poet asks what accusation it can possibly make that isn't already known to the world, and itemises the faults he has avoided:

I didn't slander my neighbours,
I never struck a low blow, I know,
I never shot hens with a slingshot,
Nor terrorised a tiny tot;
I don't abuse my poetic gift,
I haven't messed with a stranger's wife.

The shadow replies that poet would be hanged if it told on him. The poet warns it not to breathe a word of what it knows.

== Manuscripts ==
The poem survives in 23 manuscripts. Some of the key early manuscripts include Llyfr Ficer Woking (MS C 2.114), dating from 1564–1565, now held in Cardiff Central Library; MS C 4.330 (also known as MS Hafod 26) in Cardiff Central Library, made by Thomas Wiliems of Trefriw, c. 1574; MS G 3 in the Gwyneddon Davies collection at Bangor University, made by Jasper Gryffyth in 1590; MS Pen. 49 in the Peniarth collection at the National Library of Wales, Aberystwyth, made by John Davies of Mallwyd in the 16th or 17th century; and MS Pen. 76 of the Peniarth collection, dating from the mid-16th century.

== Commentary ==
The poem is, in part, a parody of a genre popular in the Middle Ages in which the Soul and the Body engage in a dialogue. Several 12th-century and earlier examples in Welsh are to be found in the Black Book of Carmarthen and elsewhere. Normally the Soul directly accuses the Body of sins which will take them both to Hell, but in Dafydd's poem the Shadow's accusations are more indirect and therefore, in Rachel Bromwich's judgement, more dramatically effective. His change of protagonists also allows him to move the contention from the deathbed or the grave, favoured by most of the earlier dialogues, to an episode in the life of the poet. Another parody of this genre is "The Soul's Conversation with the Body" by Iolo Goch, in which the Soul makes a tour of Wales in search of its Body, which is lost in a drunken stupor. Both poems are notable for the lively colloquialism of their reported speech, and Dafydd's also for its virtuoso use of dyfalu, the stringing together of imaginative and hyperbolic similes and metaphors. Though Dafydd's antagonist in this poem is not his soul several critics have interpreted it as being his conscience, which is able to charge him with all his secret sins because, as Patrick Ford wrote, "the shadow knows!". Although the poet's protestations of innocence include a claim that "I haven't messed with a stranger's wife", it has been pointed out that in his poem "Choosing One of Four" Dafydd described his affair with the wife of an Aberystwyth merchant; this raises the possibility that he intended all of his indignant denials to be taken with a pinch of salt.

Dafydd composed many poems in the form of dialogues, some of which show similarities to "His Shadow". Several involve non-human interlocutors: "In Praise of Summer", "Discouragement", "The Magpie's Advice", "Longing's Genealogy", "The Woodcock (II)", and "The Ruin". His skill in presenting the reported speech in a racy, colloquial style despite the exigencies of a very demanding metre is also demonstrated in, for example, "The Magpie's Advice" and "The Dawn". He wrote other poems in which an alter ego criticises Dafydd's attitudes and way of life: "The Magpie's Advice", "His Penis", "The Girls of Llanbadarn", and "The Poet and the Grey Friar".

== Editions ==
- Lake, A. Cynfael (ed.). "63 – Ei Gysgod". Gwaith Dafydd ap Gwilym. Welsh Department, Swansea University.
- Parry, Thomas, ed. (1983) [1962]. The Oxford Book of Welsh Verse. Oxford: Oxford University Press. pp. 92–93. ISBN 9780198121299.
- Parry, Thomas, ed. (1952). Gwaith Dafydd ap Gwilym. Caerdydd: Gwasg Prifysgol Cymru. pp. 372–373.

== Translations and paraphrases ==
- Bell, David, in Bell, H. Idris; Bell, David (1942). Fifty Poems. Y Cymmrodor, vol. 48. London: Honourable Society of Cymmrodorion. pp. 285, 287, 289. With the Middle Welsh original in parallel text.
- Bromwich, Rachel, ed. (1982). Dafydd ap Gwilym: A Selection of Poems. Llandysul: Gomer Press. pp. 190, 192. ISBN 0850888158. With the Middle Welsh original in parallel text.
- Clancy, Joseph P. (1965). Medieval Welsh Lyrics. London: Macmillan. pp. 56–58.
  - Rev. repr. in his The Poems of Dafydd ap Gwilym. Bath: Brown Dog. 2016. pp. 341–342. ISBN 9781785450891.
- Ellis, Robert, in Jones, Owen; Owen, William; Williams, Edward; Cynddelw, eds. (1873). Barddoniaeth Dafydd ab Gwilym. Liverpool: I. Foulkes. pp. 387–389.
- Ford, Patrick K., ed. (1999). The Celtic Poets: Songs and Tales from Early Ireland and Wales. Belmont, MA: Ford & Bailie. pp. 315–317. ISBN 9780926689053.
- Green, Martin (1993). Homage to Dafydd ap Gwilym. Lewiston/Queenston/Lampeter: The Edwin Mellen Press. pp. 31–32. ISBN 0773493182. An abridged paraphrase.
- Heseltine, Nigel, ed. (1968) [1944]. Twenty-Five Poems by Dafydd ap Gwilym. Banbury: Piers Press. pp. 46–48. ISBN 9780950355801.
- Humphries, Rolfe (1969). Nine Thorny Thickets. Kent, OH: Kent State University Press. pp. 57–58. ISBN 9780873380393.
- [Johnes, Arthur James] (1834). Translations into English Verse from the Poems of Davyth ap Gwilym. London: Henry Hooper. pp. 28–30.
- Lake, A. Cynfael, ed. (2007). "63 – Ei Gysgod". Dafydd ap Gwilym.net. Welsh Department, Swansea University and Centre for Advanced Welsh and Celtic Studies, University of Wales. With the Middle Welsh original.
- Loomis, Richard Morgan, ed. (1982). Dafydd ap Gwilym: The Poems. Binghamton: Center for Medieval & Early Renaissance Studies. pp. 254–255. ISBN 0866980156.
  - Rev. repr. in Loomis, Richard; Johnston, Dafydd (1992). Medieval Welsh Poems. Binghamton: Medieval & Renaissance Texts & Studies. pp. 79–81. ISBN 0866981020.
- Merchant, Paul; Faletra, Michael (2018). Unless She Beckons: Poems of Dafydd ap Gwilym. La Grande, Oregon: Redbat. pp. 29, 31. ISBN 9780997154993. With the Middle Welsh original in parallel text.
- Thomas, Gwyn, ed. (2001). Dafydd ap Gwilym: His Poems. Cardiff: University of Wales Press. pp. 276–277. ISBN 0708316646.
- Walters, Bryan (1977). From the Welsh. Aberystwyth: Celtion. pp. 21, 24. ISBN 0860530086.
- Watson, Giles (2014). Dafydd ap Gwilym: Paraphrases and Palimpsests. npp. pp. 176–177. ISBN 9781291866803.
- Wood, John (1997). The Gates of the Elect Kingdom. Iowa City: University of Iowa Press. pp. 41–42. ISBN 0877455813. Archived from the original on 29 June 2010. Abridged translation.
