= Trouble at a Tavern =

Poem by Dafydd ap Gwilym

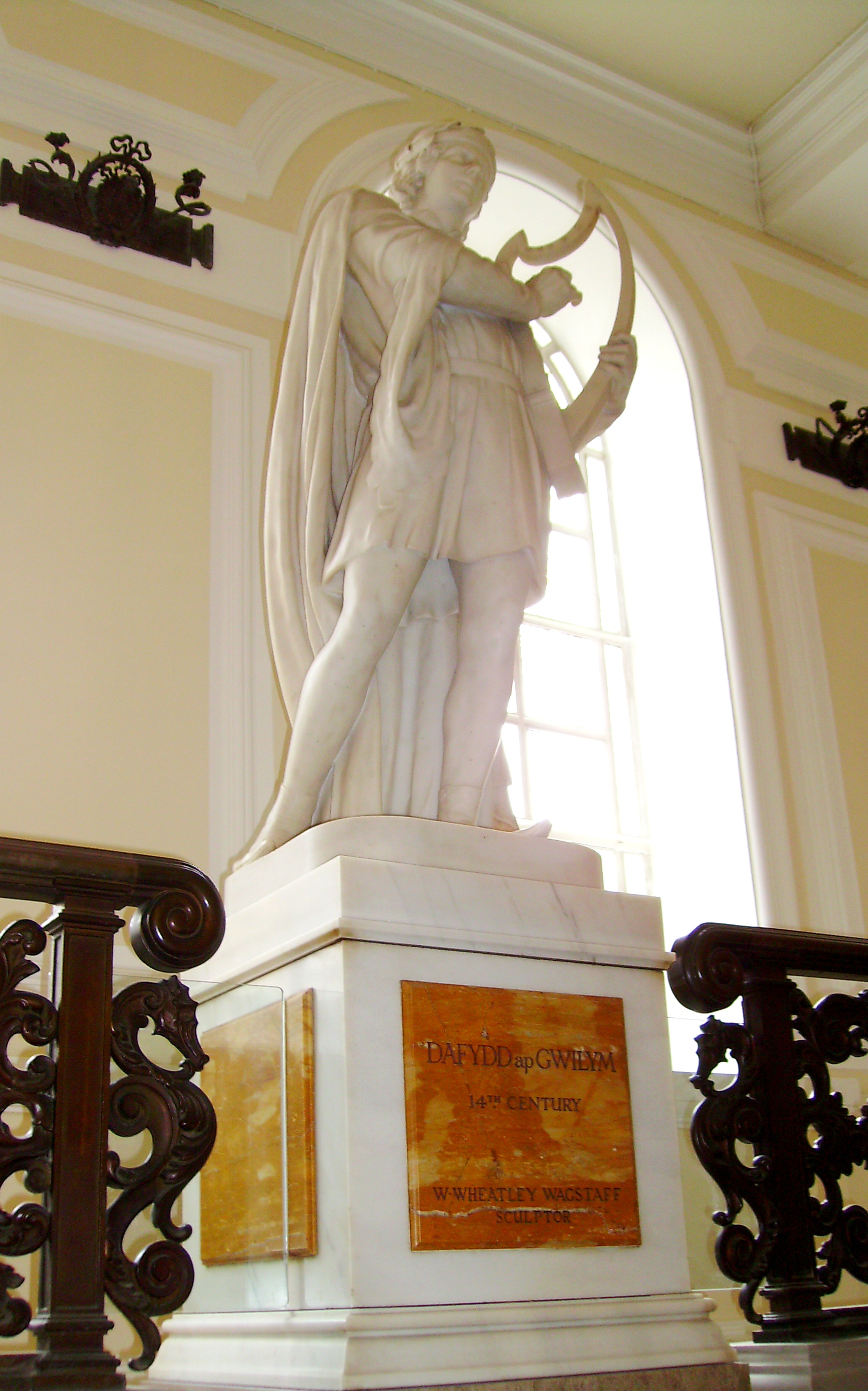
Sculpture of Dafydd ap Gwilym by W. Wheatley Wagstaff in Cardiff City Hall.

"Trouble at a Tavern", or "Trouble at an Inn" (Welsh: Trafferth mewn Tafarn), is a short poem by the 14th-century Welsh poet Dafydd ap Gwilym, in which the poet comically narrates the mishaps which prevent him from keeping a midnight assignation with a girl. Dafydd is widely seen as the greatest of the Welsh poets, and this is one of his best-known poems. It has been described as "glorious farce", "one of Dafydd ap Gwilym's funniest and most celebrated cywyddau", and "the most vivid of [his] poems of incident".

== Synopsis ==
Arriving at a "choice city" the poet finds lodging at an inn, where he meets an attractive girl. He wines and dines her, then arranges to meet her later that night. When everyone is asleep he makes his move, but stumbles over a stool in the darkness, and in getting up knocks over a table from which a brass bowl falls. The noise of all this, and of the dogs who have started barking, awakens three English tinkers called Hickin, Jenkin and Jack. They raise the alarm, believing that some Welsh thief is after their belongings. The ostler rouses the other guests, but the poet, hunted for on all hands, manages with the help of fervent prayer to reach his own bed undiscovered. He ends by asking God's forgiveness.

== Setting ==
Several allusions in the poem demonstrate Dafydd's close personal knowledge of tavern life and tavern drinks. Since such taverns were especially common in the Norman settlements in Wales it may be that the poem is set in such a town. It is widely conjectured that the town in the poem is Newborough, Anglesey, a borough established by the Crown to house the inhabitants of Llanfaes, who had been cleared from their village to facilitate the building of Beaumaris Castle. Dafydd must certainly known Newborough, since he wrote a poem in its praise.

== Style ==
"Trouble at a Tavern" is written in an jerky, excited, abrupt style, and is characterised by the use of interjections and sangiadau, or words introduced in unsyntactical places. This technique is much used in the stricter Welsh metres and is well suited to a narrative poem full of incident, tending to point up the comic anarchy of the action. The poem is full of innuendo, allowing more than one reading of its words.

== Themes and influences ==
The theme of the poet's misadventures in love is a very common one in Dafydd's work. As the novelist and scholar Gwyn Jones wrote:

No lover in any language, and certainly no poet, has confessed to missing the mark more often than Dafydd ap Gwilym. Uncooperative husbands, quick-triggered alarms, crones and walls, strong locks, floods and fogs and bogs and dogs are for ever interposing themselves between him and golden-haired Morfudd, black-browed Dyddgu, or Gwen the infinitely fair.

"Trouble at a Tavern"'s similarity to other poems by Dafydd with this same theme has enabled modern editors to attribute the poem securely to him, in spite of the fact that it survives in no manuscript from earlier than the late 16th century. The poem's mockery also extends to the English interlopers in Wales, and at least one reader has complained of its racial prejudice on that account. But the critic Tony Conran sees "Trouble at a Tavern" as being not just a comic romp but a poem shot through with multiple layers of irony, most notably in its hints that the Welsh hero is playing at being an Anglo-Norman lordling, and therefore getting a justified comeuppance. He also sees the possibility in the poem's final pious words of an ironic irreverence towards God himself. But perhaps it is simply a warning to impetuous young men not to be so foolish.

Dafydd may have derived the theme of sexual comedy from the fabliaux, rollicking tales in verse of a type which originated in France and spread across Europe, though he differs from them in making the poet himself the butt of the story. In that case there would be little or no reason to suppose the poem autobiographical. Alternatively, he could have been influenced in this respect by the works of Ovid, of Chaucer, or of the goliards. It has also been argued that the poem was based on the form of medieval morality tale known as exemplum, or that it was intended as a parody of the chivalric romance in which the narrator's humiliation is a judgement on his uncourtly attitude to love.

== English translations and paraphrases ==
- Bell, David, in Bell, H. Idris; Bell, David (1942). Fifty Poems. Y Cymmrodor, vol. 48. London: Honourable Society of Cymmrodorion. pp. 229, 231, 233. With the Middle Welsh original in parallel text.
- Bollard, John K., ed. (2019). Cymru Dafydd ap Gwilym/Dafydd ap Gwilym's Wales: Cerddi a Lleoedd/Poems and Places. Dyffryn Conwy: Gwasg Carreg Gwalch. pp. 63–65. ISBN 9781845277192. With the Middle Welsh original in parallel text.
- Bromwich, Rachel, ed. (1985) [1982]. Dafydd ap Gwilym: A Selection of Poems. Harmondsworth: Penguin. pp. 142, 144. ISBN 978-0140076134. With the Middle Welsh original in parallel text.
- Clancy, Joseph P. (1965). Medieval Welsh Lyrics. London: Macmillan. pp. 24–26.
  - Rev. repr. in Clancy, Joseph P. (2016). The Poems of Dafydd ap Gwilym. Bath: Brown Dog. pp. 68–70. ISBN 9781785450891.
- Conran, Anthony; Williams, J. E. Caerwyn, eds. (1967). The Penguin Book of Welsh Verse. Harmondsworth: Penguin. pp. 142–144.
- Ford, Patrick K., ed. (1999). The Celtic Poets: Songs and Tales from Early Ireland and Wales. Belmont, Mass.: Ford & Bailie. pp. 300–302. ISBN 9780926689053.
- Green, Martin (1993). Homage to Dafydd ap Gwilym. Lewiston/Queenston/Lampeter: The Edwin Mellen Press. pp. 16–17. ISBN 0773493182.
- Heseltine, Nigel, ed. (1968) [1944]. Twenty-Five Poems by Dafydd ap Gwilym. Banbury: Piers Press. pp. 28–30.
- Humphreys, Nigel (2015). Edmunds, Catherine (ed.). The Love Song of Daphnis & Chloe and 5 Dafydd ap Gwilym Poems (c1320 to c1370). Hastings: Circaidy Gregory Press. pp. 123–125. ISBN 9781906451882.
- Humphries, Rolfe (1969). Nine Thorny Thickets. Kent, Ohio: Kent State University Press. pp. 25–27.
- Jackson, Kenneth Hurlstone, ed. (1971) [1951]. A Celtic Miscellany. Harmondsworth: Penguin. pp. 210–211. ISBN 978-0140442472.
- Johnston, Dafydd (Winter 2008). "Semantic Ambiguity in Dafydd ap Gwilym's "Trafferth mewn Tafarn"". Cambrian Medieval Celtic Studies. 56: 64–65, 70–71. ISBN 9780952747857.
  - Rev. repr. at "English Translation: 73 - Trafferth mewn Tafarn". Gwaith Dafydd ap Gwilym. Welsh Department, Swansea University.
- Lofmark, Carl (1989). Bards and Heroes. Felinferch: Llanerch. pp. 92–93. ISBN 978-0947992347.
- Loomis, Richard Morgan, ed. (1982). Dafydd ap Gwilym: The Poems. Binghamton: Center for Medieval & Early Renaissance Studies. pp. 230–231. ISBN 978-0866980159.
  - Rev. repr. in Loomis, Richard; Johnston, Dafydd (1992). Medieval Welsh Poems. Binghamton: Medieval & Renaissance Texts & Studies. pp. 57–59. ISBN 978-0866981026.
- Merchant, Paul (2006). Some Business of Affinity. Hereford: Five Seasons Press. pp. 113–114. ISBN 0947960392.
  - Rev. repr. in Merchant, Paul; Faletra, Michael (2018). Unless She Beckons: Poems of Dafydd ap Gwilym. La Grande, Oregon: Redbat. pp. 65, 67. ISBN 9780997154993. With the Middle Welsh original in parallel text.
- Thomas, Gwyn, ed. (2001). Dafydd ap Gwilym: His Poems. Cardiff: University of Wales Press. pp. 241–242. ISBN 978-0708316641.
- Walters, Bryan (1977). From the Welsh. Aberystwyth: Celtion. pp. 13–14. ISBN 0860530086.
- Watson, Giles (2014). Dafydd ap Gwilym: Paraphrases and Palimpsests. npp: pp. pp. 103–104. ISBN 9781291866803.
- Williams, Gwyn, ed. (1976). To Look for a Word. Llandysul: Gomer Press. pp. 57–58. ISBN 978-0850883565.
- Wood, John (1997). The Gates of the Elect Kingdom. Iowa City: University of Iowa Press. pp. 42–43. ISBN 0877455813. Archived from the original on 29 June 2010.
