= The Magpie's Advice =

Poem by Dafydd ap Gwilym

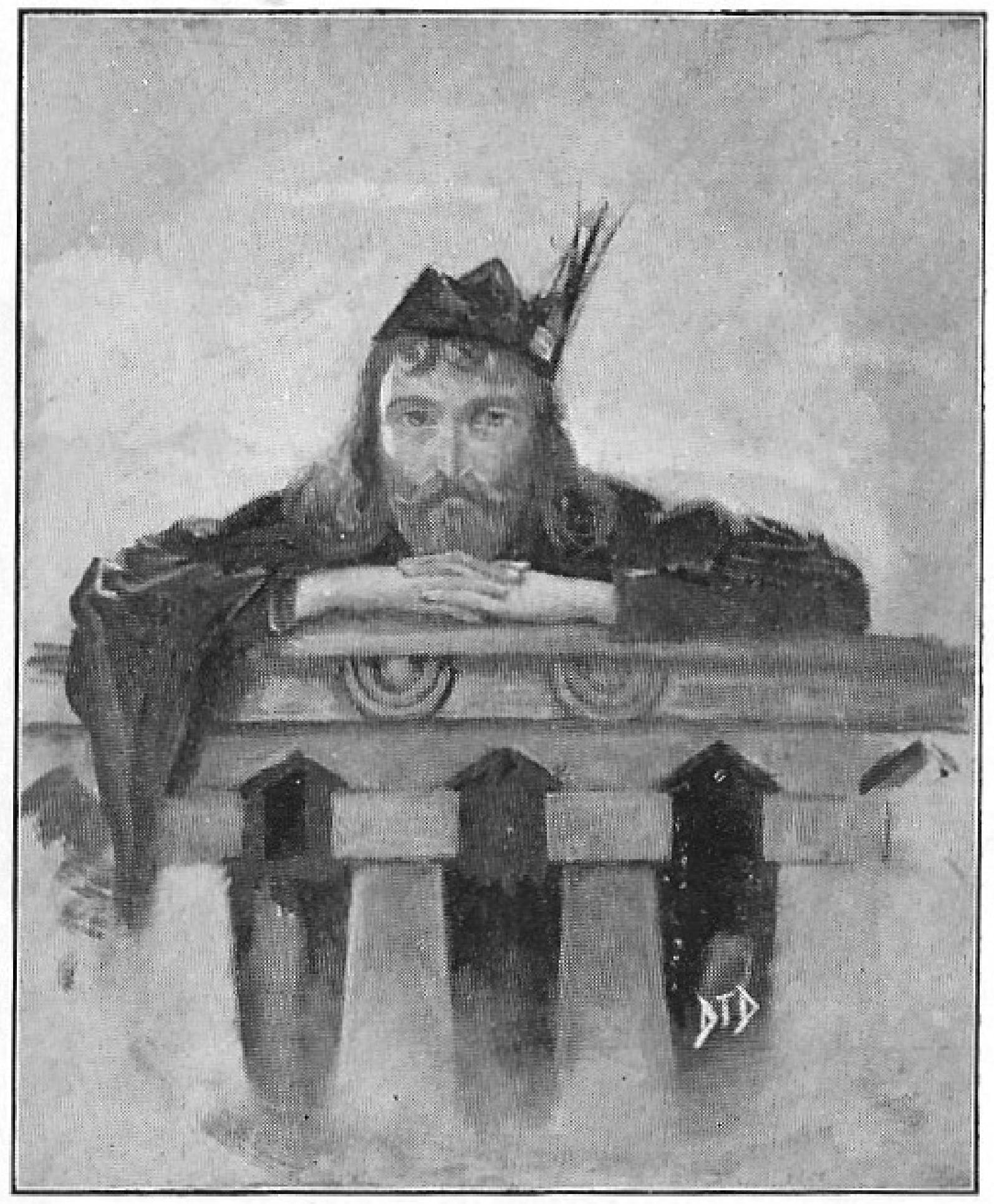
Imaginary portrait of Dafydd ap Gwilym from Owen M. Edwards (ed.) Gwaith Dafydd ap Gwilym (1901)

"The Magpie's Advice" or "The Magpie's Counsel" (Welsh: Cyngor y Biogen or Cyngor y Bioden) is a poem in the form of a cywydd by the pre-eminent Welsh-language poet, Dafydd ap Gwilym. The poet portrays himself as an overage lover who bemoans his romantic woes as he wanders through the woods, and is rebuked by a magpie who bids him concern himself with matters more befitting his years. It can be read either as a comic and self-mocking reversal of the traditional Welsh poetic trope of the non-human messenger, or llatai, being sent to the poet's lover, or as a meditation on the contrast between the yearly cycle of renewal in the natural world and the linear ageing of men, which falsifies any simplistic identification we may make with nature. It has always been one of Dafydd's more popular poems, surviving in 55 manuscripts and being widely translated in the 20th and 21st centuries. Sir Thomas Parry included it in his Oxford Book of Welsh Verse.

== Summary ==
Lovesick and sorrowing over his golden girl, the poet is in the woods in early April. He describes the birds he sees and hears, the nightingale, blackbird, thrush and lark, and, feeling joy in the midst of his distress, observes the trees in their new greenery. A magpie building its nest there addresses him as "old man" and tells him he would be better off by a fireside than in rainy woodland. The poet replies that he is waiting for his girl and bids the magpie begone. The magpie says that talk of girls doesn't befit the old. The poet makes polite remarks about the magpie's appearance, while disparaging it and its nest in muttered asides. (Note: So Gwyn Thomas read these lines, though Rachel Bromwich interpreted them as being hostile to the magpie throughout.) If it's so wise won't it advise him? The magpie tells him he has no business with beautiful girls; he should become a hermit instead. The poet promises us that no magpie's nest he sees again will keep its eggs or fledglings.

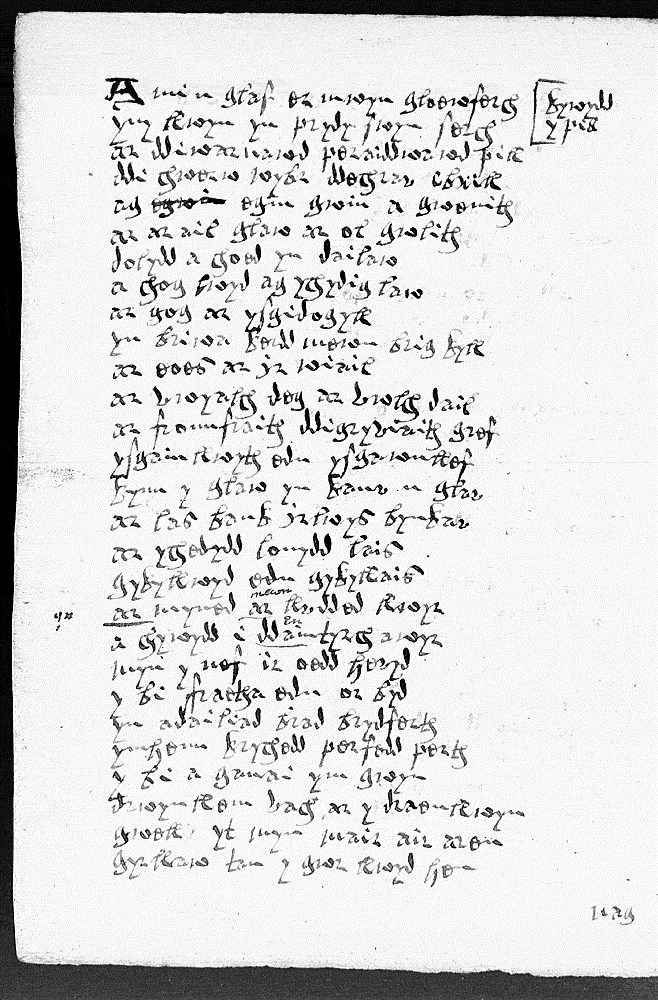
The opening of "The Magpie's Advice" in NLW MS Llanstephan 47, a manuscript copied between 1586 and 1590 by the Welsh bard Llywelyn Siôn

== Manuscripts ==
"The Magpie's Advice" survives in as many as 55 manuscripts, and its transmission history is complex. Five of the manuscripts (Cardiff Central Library MS 5.44, known as Llyfr Hir Llanharan; NLW MS Llanstephan 47; NLW MS Llanstephan 134; NLW MS 21290E; and NLW MS 970E) were copied by the 16th/17th century bard Llywelyn Siôn from the lost Llyfr Wiliam Mathew, a late 15th- or early 16th-century manuscript. Another three (Cardiff Central Library MS 4.330, copied by Thomas Wiliems; Bangor University, Gwyneddon Davies Collection MS 3, copied by Jasper Gryffyth; and NLW MS Peniarth 49, copied by John Davies of Mallwyd) derive from the lost Vetustus Codex, an important collection of Dafydd ap Gwilym's poems copied c. 1526. Other notable manuscripts containing this poem include Cardiff Central Library MS 2.114, also known as the Llyfr Ficer Woking, and NLW MS 3047C, copied by the poet William Phylip. The texts given by these manuscripts have more variant readings and more differences of line-order and number of lines than any other of Dafydd's poems.

== Date ==
"The Magpie's Advice", like all of Dafydd's poems, cannot be precisely dated. The translator Joseph P. Clancy was convinced that it came from the last phase of Dafydd's career, which itself cannot be closely dated since scholars disagree as to whether he died c. 1350 or c. 1370, but Dafydd Johnston has warned against taking its references to the poet's old age literally and suggested that they may have been intended humorously, Dafydd's audience being well able to see his real age.

== Sources ==
Several scholars of Welsh literature have suggested possible sources for this poem. Sir Thomas Parry was reminded of the dialogue in the Mabinogi and other medieval Welsh tales. Rachel Bromwich and Huw M. Edwards postulated the existence of a tradition of popular poetry before Dafydd's time in which birds are asked for advice, though such poems are only actually evidenced from the 16th century and later. More firmly established is the link between "The Magpie's Advice" and medieval French (including Occitan) poetry of courtly love. There, for example, examples can be found of unhappy lovers being advised to become hermits. From the late 11th century onwards there are many examples of the verse-form known as the reverdie in which the poet greets the spring and contrasts his own unhappy love-life with that of the joyful birds, just as in Dafydd's poem, though Dafydd uses this trope ironically to mock his own romantic agonies. A still older possible source for the poem has been suggested in the story of Tereus and Procne in Ovid's Metamorphoses, though the roles are here reversed.

== Analogues in Dafydd's poems ==
"The Magpie's Advice" shares themes, motifs and techniques with other poems by Dafydd. His skill in presenting reported speech in a racy, colloquial style despite the exigencies of a very demanding metre, apparent in "The Magpie's Advice", is also demonstrated in, for example, "His Shadow" and "The Dawn". Dafydd composed many poems in the form of dialogues with non-human interlocutors: "In Praise of Summer", "Despondency", "His Shadow", "Longing's Genealogy", "The Woodcock (II)", and "The Ruin". Of these, "Despondency" and "The Woodcock (II)", like "The Magpie's Advice", both describe debates about love with talking birds, and indeed "Despondency" includes a couplet almost word-for-word identical with one in "The Magpie's Advice". The magpie's criticism of Dafydd's way of life is reminiscent of that delivered in "The Poet and the Grey Friar", and the suggestion that he become a hermit is also made in his "The Girls of Llanbadarn". And just as he made light of the reverdie form, he did the same with other Continental genres in his "The Dawn", "Under the Eaves" and other poems.

== Natural description and folklore ==
The first section, descriptive of an April morning in woodland, might be seen as a needless digression from the poem's theme, but Dafydd did not readily let an opportunity for natural description pass. Nor was he ignorant of his subject. He writes of the skylark's flight "on its backward course", apparently referring to that bird's habit of sometimes turning into the wind and being blown back by it. Several characteristics of the magpie, including its cunning and monogamy and the male's participation in nest-building, are, Rachel Bromwich notes, reflected in the poem, and she quotes the naturalist William Henry Hudson as writing that

In disposition the magpie is restless, inquisitive, excitable, and loquacious...the usual sound emitted by the magpie is an excited chatter...but there is always a certain resemblance to the human voice in it, especially when the birds are alarmed, and converse with one another in subdued tones.

Dafydd's portrayal of the magpie is also informed by Welsh folklore. Popular tradition considered the magpie to be deceitful and capable of human speech (cf. "you would learn every fine far-off language", line 59), and it was believed to be, according to the literary historian Dafydd Johnston, "a bird of ill-omen, with a drop of the Devil's blood in it". In Welsh poems of the period magpies were associated with Hell and the Otherworld; Dafydd calls it in this poem an "extremely vicious, infernal bird".

== Editions ==
- Williams, Ifor; Roberts, Thomas, eds. (1935) [1914]. Cywyddau Dafydd ap Gwilym a'i Gyfoeswyr. Caerdydd: Gwasg Prifysgol Cymru. pp. 76–78.
- Parry, Thomas, ed. (1952). Gwaith Dafydd ap Gwilym. Caerdydd: Gwasg Prifysgol Cymru. pp. 167–169.
- Parry, Thomas, ed. (1962). The Oxford Book of Welsh Verse. Oxford: Oxford University Press. pp. 63–65. ISBN 9780198121299.
- Johnston, Dafydd (ed.). "36 - Cyngor y Bioden". Dafydd ap Gwilym.net. Welsh Department, Swansea University.

== Translations and paraphrases ==
- Bell, H. Idris, in Bell, H. Idris; Bell, David (1942). Fifty Poems. Y Cymmrodor, vol. 48. London: Honourable Society of Cymmrodorion. pp. 217, 219, 221. With the Middle Welsh original in parallel text.
- Bromwich, Rachel, ed. (1982). Dafydd ap Gwilym: A Selection of Poems. Llandysul: Gomer Press. pp. 80, 82. ISBN 0850888158. With the Middle Welsh original in parallel text.
- Clancy, Joseph P. (1965). Medieval Welsh Lyrics. London: Macmillan. pp. 101–103.
  - Rev. repr. in his The Poems of Dafydd ap Gwilym. Bath: Brown Dog. 2016. pp. 343–345. ISBN 9781785450891.
- Ford, Patrick K., ed. (1999). The Celtic Poets: Songs and Tales from Early Ireland and Wales. Belmont, MA: Ford & Bailie. pp. 308–310. ISBN 9780926689053.
- Gurney, Robert, ed. (1969). Bardic Heritage. London: Chatto & Windus. pp. 127–129. ISBN 0701113286.
- Jackson, Kenneth Hurlstone, ed. (1971) [1951]. A Celtic Miscellany. Harmondsworth: Penguin. pp. 211–213. ISBN 9780140442472.
- Johnston, Dafydd (ed.). "36 - Cyngor y Bioden". Dafydd ap Gwilym.net. Welsh Department, Swansea University. With the Middle Welsh original.
- Loomis, Richard Morgan, ed. (1982). Dafydd ap Gwilym: The Poems. Binghamton: Center for Medieval & Early Renaissance Studies. pp. 146–148. ISBN 0866980156.
  - Rev. repr. in Loomis, Richard; Johnston, Dafydd (1992). Medieval Welsh Poems. Binghamton: Medieval & Renaissance Texts & Studies. pp. 89–91. ISBN 0866981020.
- Merchant, Paul; Faletra, Michael (2018). Unless She Beckons: Poems of Dafydd ap Gwilym. La Grande, Oregon: Redbat. pp. 85, 87, 89. ISBN 9780997154993. With the Middle Welsh original in parallel text.
- Thomas, Gwyn, ed. (2001). Dafydd ap Gwilym: His Poems. Cardiff: University of Wales Press. pp. 129–131. ISBN 0708316646.
- Watson, Giles (2014). Dafydd ap Gwilym: Paraphrases and Palimpsests. npp. pp. 87–88. ISBN 9781291866803.
