= The Seagull (poem) =

14th century poem

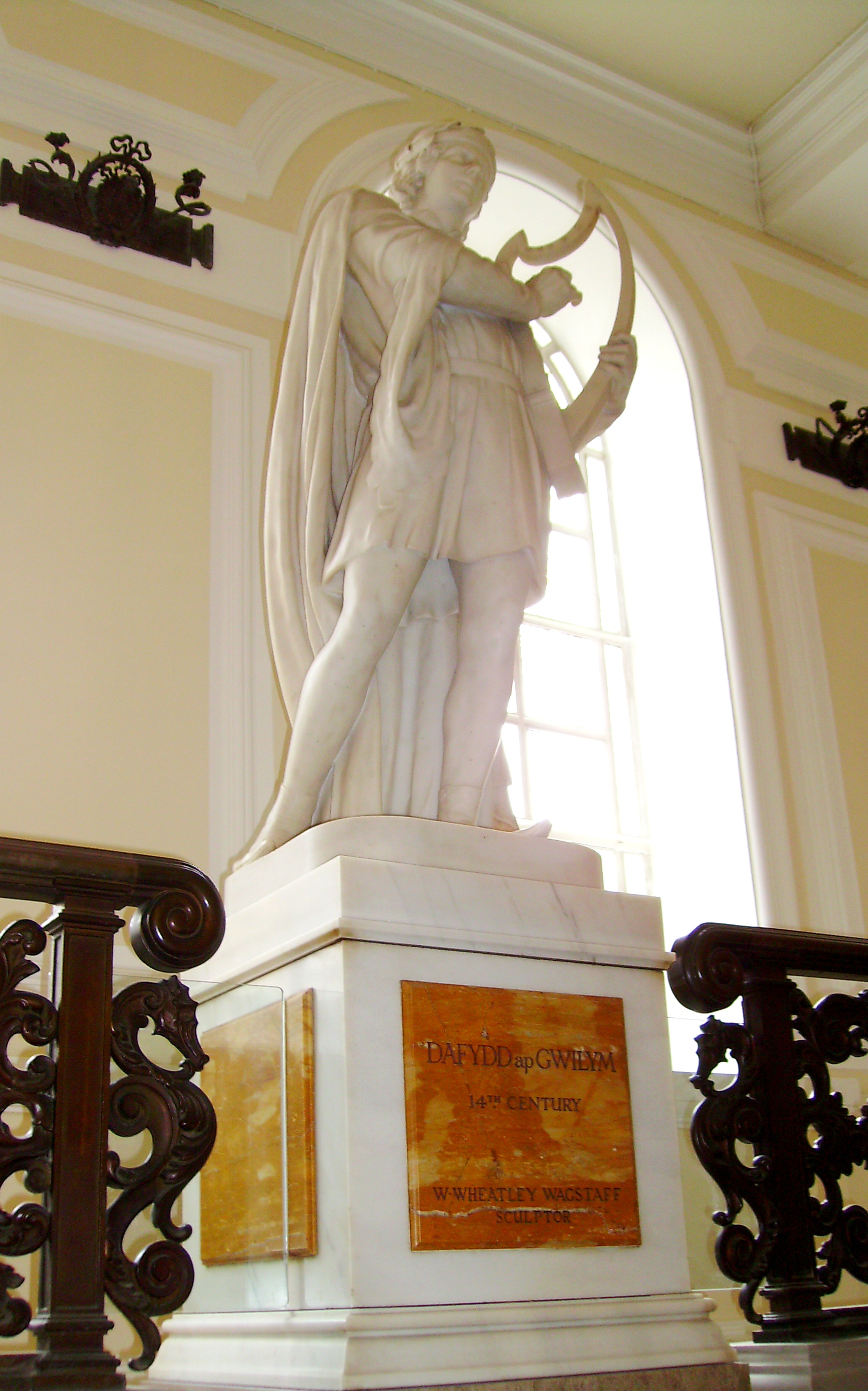
Sculpture of Dafydd ap Gwilym by W. Wheatley Wagstaff in Cardiff City Hall.

"The Seagull" (Welsh: Yr Wylan) is a love poem in 30 lines by the 14th-century Welsh poet Dafydd ap Gwilym, probably written in or around the 1340s. Dafydd is widely seen as the greatest of the Welsh poets, and this is one of his best-known and best-loved works.

== Summary ==
The poet addresses and praises a seagull flying over the waves, comparing it to, among other things, a gauntlet, a ship at anchor, a sea-lily, and a nun. He asks it to find a girl whom he compares to Eigr and who can be found on the ramparts of a castle, to intercede with her, and to tell her that the poet cannot live without her. He loves her for her beauty more than Myrddin or Taliesin ever loved, and unless he wins kind words from her he will die.

== Imagery ==
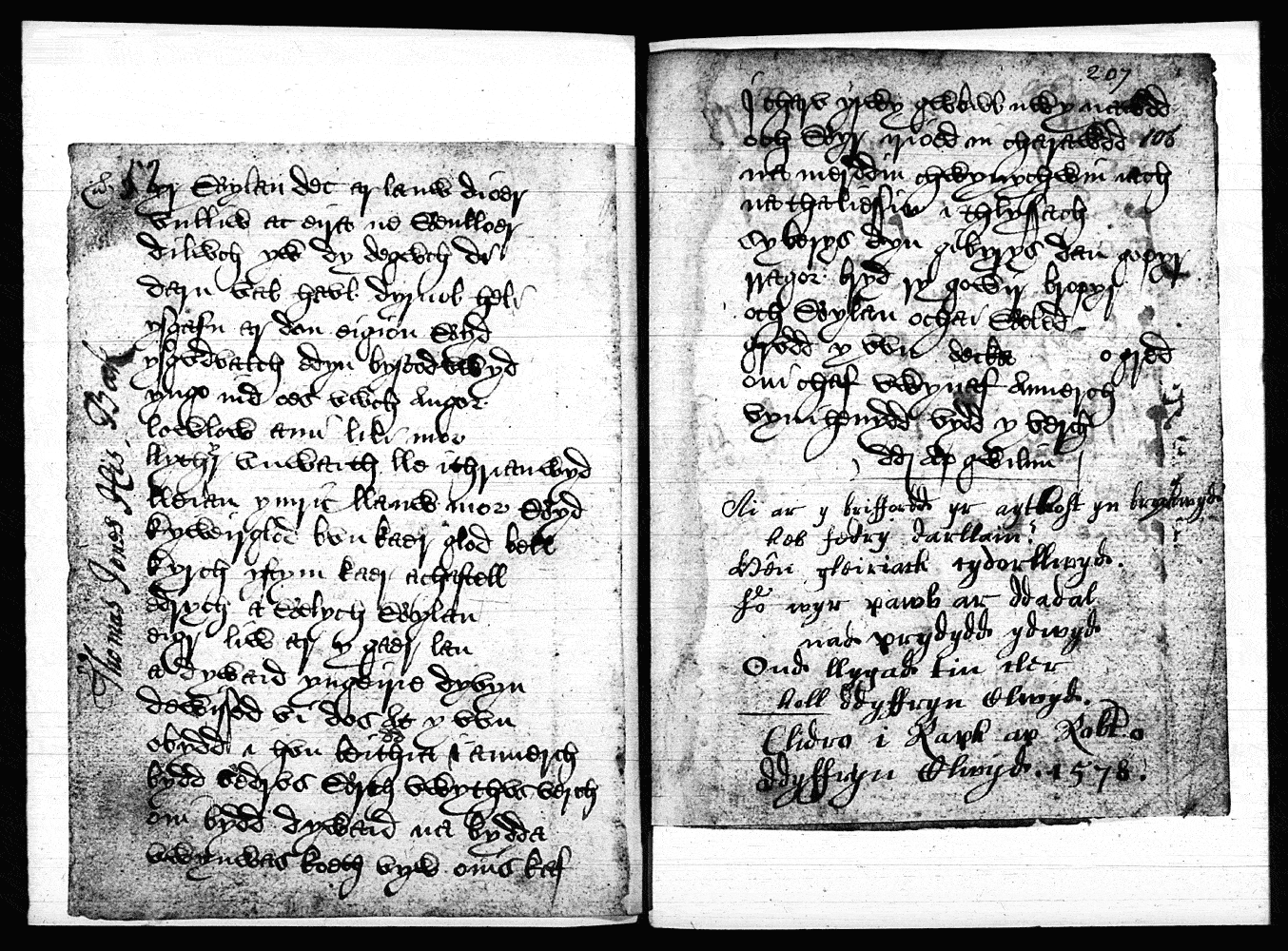
The poem in BL Add. MS 14997, a manuscript dating from c. 1500.

The academic critic Huw Meirion Edwards considered that "The Seagull"’s imagery goes far beyond anything that had come before it in Welsh poetry, and Anthony Conran wrote that "pictorially it is superb…[it] has the visual completeness, brilliance and unity of a medieval illumination, a picture from a book of hours". Dafydd wrote several love-messenger poems, and is indeed considered the master of that form. They follow an established pattern, beginning by addressing the llatai, or messenger, going on to describe it in terms of praise, then asking the llatai to take the poet's message to his lover, and finally in general adding a prayer that the messenger return safely. But in "The Seagull", as with Dafydd's other bird-poems, the gull is more than just a conventional llatai: the bird's appearance and behaviour are observed closely, while at the same time Dafydd shows, according to the scholar Rachel Bromwich, "an almost mystical reverence" for it. The image of the seagull's beautiful, white, immaculate purity suggests that of the girl, while the bird's flight embodies the idea of freedom, in contrast with the dominating and enclosing castle. This castle has not been positively identified, although Aberystwyth and Criccieth have both been suggested. The girl herself is unusual in two respects, firstly in the paucity of physical detail in Dafydd's description of her as compared with the women in his other love poems, and secondly in that she is a redhead, as very few women in medieval Welsh poetry are.

== Poetic art ==
The seagull is described in what has been called "a guessing game technique" or "riddling", a technique known in Welsh as dyfalu comprising the stringing together of imaginative and hyperbolic similes and metaphors. Dafydd also uses devices for breaking up syntax known as sangiad ("insertion, interpolation") and tor ymadrodd ("interruption of sentence"). So, for example:

A bydd, dywaid na byddaf,
Fwynwas coeth, fyw onis caf.

— lines 19-20
Translation:

And be, say that I shall not be,
An elegant kind-servant, living unless I win her.

— Translated by Idris Bell

The translator Idris Bell explained the sense of this as "Have the kindness in courteous wise to give her the message that I shall die unless she will be mine."

== Construction ==
The poem consists of 30 lines (or 15 rhyming couplets) in the cywydd metre. In this metrical form, each line has 7 syllables, with a break usually after the 3rd or 4th syllable, but sometimes after the 1st or 2nd. The final word in each half-line has a stress. Some words which in modern Welsh are pronounced with two syllables were treated as monosyllables in earlier Welsh, e.g. llanw, eiry, lythr.

In each couplet one line (either the first or second) ends in a monosyllable and the other in a polysyllable, ensuring that the rhyme occurs in a stressed syllable in one line and in an unstressed one in the other, e.g. béll, chástell or hánnerch, férch.

== Cynghanedd ("Sound-harmony") ==
As usual in cywydd poems, each line makes use of the technique known as cynghanedd, or sound-harmony. Three different types are used in this poem:

- Cynghanedd groes, in which all the consonants except the last in the first half of the line are repeated in the same order in the second half (lines 1, 4, 8–12, 16, 17, 19, 20, 24, 26, 27):

Yr wylan dég, ar lanw dióer

— line 1, repeating R L N D
Translation:

O beautiful seagull on the flood-tide, God knows,

Darn fal hául, dyrnfol héli.

— line 4, repeating D R N F H L
Translation:

Like a piece of the sun, (or like) a gauntlet of the sea

Na Thaliésin ei thlýsach

— line 24, repeating N TH L S
Translation:

Nor (did) Taliesin (ever love a girl) more beautiful than her

Ideally, the matched consonants must be arranged round the stressed vowel in the same way in each half: thus in line 24, N, TH and L come before the stressed vowel, and S immediately after it. But the final letters of the two half-lines must not match.

- Cynghanedd draws, in which there are some consonants at the beginning of the second half which do not repeat any consonants in the first half (lines 2, 6, 7, 14, 15, 22, 28):

Unlliw ag eiry neu wenlloer

— line 2, repeating N and LL
Translation:

The same colour as snow or a bright moon

Esgudfalch edn bysgodfwyd

— line 6, repeating S G D F
Translation:

Speed-proud, fish-eating bird

- Cynghanedd sain: the line is divided into three parts instead of the usual two; the first two parts have rhyme and the second and third parts have repeating consonants (lines 3, 5, 13, 18, 21, 23, 25, 29, 30):

Dilwch yw dy degwch di

— line 3, rhyming -wch, repeating D
Translation:

Immaculate is your beauty

Siprys dyn giprys, dan gopr

— line 25, rhyming -iprys, repeating D N G P R
Translation:

(Wearing) fine linen, a girl (arousing) rivalry, beneath (hair of) copper

Oni chaf fwynaf annerch

— line 29, rhyming -af, repeating F N
Translation:

If I do not receive a most gentle greeting

The fourth type of cynghanedd, cynghanedd lusg, which has internal rhyme but no consonant matching, is not used in this poem.

The twin requirements of rhyme and cynghanedd mean that often words are chosen for their sound as much as for their meaning. Another constraint is that one of the rhyming words at the end of the lines in a couplet must be a monosyllable (or polysyllable stressed on the final) and the other a polysyllable with penultimate stress.

== References to older poetry ==
Eigr, with whom Dafydd compares his beloved, was in Welsh tradition the wife of Uther Pendragon and mother of King Arthur. She is the heroine he most often cites as the archetypical beautiful woman. The legendary figures of Myrddin and Taliesin are often invoked together in Welsh verse, and in some early poems Myrddin is presented as a lover, though Taliesin was not, making Dafydd's mention of him in this role rather odd. It has been argued that these two figures are introduced as a tribute to one of the wellsprings of Dafydd's work, the native Welsh poetic tradition, while on the other hand the terms in which he describes his submission to the girl acknowledge one of the other great influences on him, the literature of courtly love, stemming from Provence but by Dafydd's time to be found across Europe.

== Adaptations ==
- Glyn Jones wrote a poem, "Dafydd's Seagull and the West Wind", which gives the seagull's response.
- John Hardy set "The Seagull" as part of a song-cycle called Fflamau Oer: Songs for Jeremy.
- David Vaughan Thomas wrote a musical setting of the poem in 1924 which was published posthumously in 1950.
- Robert Spearing set the poem, together with some lines from Romeo and Juliet, in his cantata for tenor and piano She Solus.

== English translations and paraphrases ==
- Anonymous (1 October 1873). "The Poems of Dafydd ab Gwilim". The Westminster and Foreign Quarterly Review. 100 (198): 379.
- Bell, David, in Bell, H. Idris; Bell, David (1942). Fifty Poems. Y Cymmrodor, vol. 48. London: Honourable Society of Cymmrodorion. pp. 177, 179. With the Middle Welsh original in parallel text.
- Bromwich, Rachel, ed. (1985) [1982]. Dafydd ap Gwilym: A Selection of Poems. Harmondsworth: Penguin. p. 74. ISBN 0140076131. With the Middle Welsh original in parallel text.
- Clancy, Joseph P. (1965). Medieval Welsh Lyrics. London: Macmillan. p. 23.
  - Rev. repr. in Clancy, Joseph P. (2016). The Poems of Dafydd ap Gwilym. Bath: Brown Dog. p. 38. ISBN 9781785450891.
- Conran, Anthony; Williams, J. E. Caerwyn, eds. (1967). The Penguin Book of Welsh Verse. Harmondsworth: Penguin. pp. 139–140.
- Ford, Patrick K., ed. (1999). The Celtic Poets: Songs and Tales from Early Ireland and Wales. Belmont, Mass.: Ford & Bailie. pp. 284–285. ISBN 9780926689053.
- Green, Martin (1993). Homage to Dafydd ap Gwilym. Lewiston/Queenston/Lampeter: The Edwin Mellen Press. pp. 1–2. ISBN 0773493182.
- Gurney, Robert, ed. (1969). Bardic Heritage. London: Chatto & Windus. pp. 130–131. ISBN 0701113286.
- Heseltine, Nigel, ed. (1968) [1944]. Twenty-Five Poems by Dafydd ap Gwilym. Banbury: Piers Press. pp. 4–5.
- Jackson, Kenneth Hurlstone, ed. (1971) [1951]. A Celtic Miscellany. Harmondsworth: Penguin. pp. 100–101. ISBN 0140442472.
- Johnes, Arthur James (1834). Translations into English Verse from the Poems of Davyth ap Gwilym. London: Henry Hooper. pp. 11–12.
- Johnston, Dafydd (1994). The Literature of Wales. Cardiff: University of Wales Press. p. 38. ISBN 0708312659.
- Jones, Glyn. "The seagull". Poetry Quarterly (51): 214. Winter 1950.
  - Repr. in Jones, Glyn (1975). Selected Poems. Llandysul: Gomer Press. p. 44. ISBN 0850883083.
- Lewes, Evelyn (1914). Life and Poems of Dafydd ap Gwilym. London: David Nutt. pp. 48–49.
- Loomis, Richard Morgan, ed. (1982). Dafydd ap Gwilym: The Poems. Binghamton: Center for Medieval & Early Renaissance Studies. pp. 222–223. ISBN 0866980156.
  - Rev. repr. in Loomis, Richard; Johnston, Dafydd (1992). Medieval Welsh Poems. Binghamton: Medieval & Renaissance Texts & Studies. p. 77. ISBN 0866981020.
- Merchant, Paul; Faletra, Michael (2018). Unless She Beckons: Poems of Dafydd ap Gwilym. La Grande, Oregon: Redbat. p. 43. ISBN 9780997154993. With the Middle Welsh original in parallel text.
- Norris, Leslie (1996). Collected Poems. Bridgend: Seren. p. 158. ISBN 1854111329.
- Stephens, Thomas (1849). The Literature of the Kymry: Being a Critical Essay on the History of the Language and Literature of Wales. Llandovery: William Reese. pp. 486–487.
- Thomas, Gwyn, ed. (2001). Dafydd ap Gwilym: His Poems. Cardiff: University of Wales Press. p. 229. ISBN 0708316646.
- Watson, Giles (2012). Dafydd ap Gwilym: Paraphrases and Palimpsests. npp: pp. p. 55. ISBN 9781291866803.
- Wood, John (1997). The Gates of the Elect Kingdom. Iowa City: University of Iowa Press. pp. 36–37. ISBN 0877455813. Archived from the original on 29 June 2010.

== See also ==
- Sandesha Kavya
