= The Ruin (Dafydd ap Gwilym poem) =

Poem by Dafydd ap Gwilym

"The Ruin" (Welsh: Yr Adfail) is a cywydd by the 14th-century Welsh poet Dafydd ap Gwilym, widely seen as the greatest of the Welsh poets. In it the poet, considering a ruined house and remembering the love-affair he once conducted there, reflects on the transience of all worldly pleasures. "The Ruin" is commonly supposed to have been written in Dafydd's old age. It has been called one of his most poignant poems, and it was included in The Penguin Book of Welsh Verse, The Oxford Book of Welsh Verse, The Oxford Book of Welsh Verse in English and The Longman Anthology of British Literature.

== Synopsis ==
The poet considers the prospect of a ruined building which was once an inhabited house, and reflects on former days when one of the residents was a woman who loved him and whom he loved, and on the days of pleasure they knew.

Ease and bliss beneath your rafters,
But today is not that day.

The house itself replies, lamenting the damage that the winds have wreaked on it. The poet again contrasts the derelict state of the building with the comfortable love-nest he once knew, and finally wonders whether the wreckage he sees before him is a delusion, but the house ends the poem by assuring the poet that the family have gone to their graves.

== Manuscripts ==
The poem survives in 26 manuscripts. Among the key early manuscripts are Peniarth 182 (written by Sir Huw Pennant of Flintshire around 1514); Hafod 26, also known as Cardiff 4.330 (written by Thomas Wiliems around 1574); Llansteffan 120 (written by Jaspar Gryffyth between about 1597 and 1607); Cwrtmawr 5 (probably written by Ieuan or Ifan Tudur Owen of Dugoed, Mawddwy, early 17th century); and Peniarth 49 (written by John Davies in the early 17th century).

== Analysis ==
"The Ruin" is Dafydd's only poem about a house, but it resembles six other poems of his, namely "Summer", "A Cock-thrush", "The Magpie's Advice", "Longing", "A Woodcock", and "His Shadow", in that it represents him in conversation with a non-human interlocutor. This may not be not the only fantastic motif in the poem. Dafydd twice uses the word teulu, "horde"; R. Geraint Gruffydd argued that this is a reference to the Phantom Horde of the mythological figure Gwyn ap Nudd. By this interpretation the poem would compare the wind's destructive passage, stripping away the good old days, to Gwyn's horde. Another critic sees it as implicit in the poem that the poet-figure is himself a ghost.

"The Ruin" is pervaded by a sense of desolation, of the transitoriness and mutability of this world's pleasures, and in particular of the love of women when it is based on physical rather than spiritual attraction. It might be seen as ending with an expression of nostalgia for an existence that now belongs to the irretrievable past, or alternatively with "a conviction that what was good remains so". The ruined house can be seen as an emblem of Dafydd's feeling of "emptiness as he expresses feelings of being laid bare by storms of passion", of his approaching dotage and death, of the fall of man, or even (though this is contentious) of his sense of all that Wales has lost in its conquest by England.

The woman in the poem, Dafydd's former love, is never named, but she is by some identified with a figure who appears in several of Dafydd's poems and to whom he gives the name Morfudd. Dafydd described Morfudd as tall, blonde, and well-born, as having religious objections to returning his love, and as eventually being married off by her family to another man.

== Analogues ==
The theme of contemptus mundi, contempt for all that the secular world can offer, is a very common one, not only in Dafydd's other works but in all medieval literature that draws on the teaching of the Church. The ruin as a subject for poetry is one that could have been familiar to Dafydd from the englynion collected in the Canu Llywarch Hen and the Canu Heledd, such as the well-known poem on the destruction of Cynddylan's hall at Pengwern, and it can also be found in poems written in Irish, Anglo-Saxon and Latin. The theme of the remembered love-affair is however a characteristic addition by Dafydd.

== English translations and paraphrases ==
- Bollard, John K., ed. (2019). Cymru Dafydd ap Gwilym/Dafydd ap Gwilym's Wales: Cerddi a Lleoedd/Poems and Places. Dyffryn Conwy: Gwasg Carreg Gwalch. pp. 101–102. ISBN 9781845277192. With the Middle Welsh original in parallel text.
- Bromwich, Rachel, ed. (1982). Dafydd ap Gwilym: A Selection of Poems. Llandysul: Gomer Press. p. 186. ISBN 0850888158. With the Middle Welsh original in parallel text.
- Clancy, Joseph P. (1965). Medieval Welsh Lyrics. London: Macmillan. pp. 104–105.
  - Rev. repr. in his The Poems of Dafydd ap Gwilym. Bath: Brown Dog. 2016. pp. 350–351. ISBN 9781785450891.
- Conran, Anthony; Williams, J. E. Caerwyn, eds. (1967). The Penguin Book of Welsh Verse. Harmondsworth: Penguin. pp. 149–150. ISBN 9780140420968.
  - Rev. repr. in Conran, Tony (1986). Welsh Verse. Bridgend: Seren. pp. 180–181. ISBN 1854110810.
- Ford, Patrick K., ed. (1999). The Celtic Poets: Songs and Tales from Early Ireland and Wales. Belmont, Mass.: Ford & Bailie. pp. 278–279. ISBN 9780926689053.
- Foreman, A. Z. (May 2017). "Dafydd ap Gwilym: The Ruin (From Welsh)". Poems in Translation.
- Humphries, Rolfe (1969). Nine Thorny Thickets. Kent, Ohio: Kent State University Press. pp. 60–61. ISBN 9780873380393.
- Lake, A. Cynfael. At "151 - Yr Adfail". Gwaith Dafydd ap Gwilym. Welsh Department, Swansea University.
- Loomis, Richard Morgan, ed. (1982). Dafydd ap Gwilym: The Poems. Binghamton: Center for Medieval & Early Renaissance Studies. pp. 258–259. ISBN 0866980156.
- Merchant, Paul; Faletra, Michael (2018). Unless She Beckons: Poems of Dafydd ap Gwilym. La Grande, Oregon: Redbat. pp. 69, 71. ISBN 9780997154993. With the Middle Welsh original in parallel text.
- Thomas, Gwyn, ed. (2001). Dafydd ap Gwilym: His Poems. Cardiff: University of Wales Press. pp. 282–283. ISBN 0708316646.
- Watson, Giles (2014). Dafydd ap Gwilym: Paraphrases and Palimpsests. npp: pp. pp. 22–23. ISBN 9781291866803.
