= The Girls of Llanbadarn =

Poem by Dafydd ap Gwilym

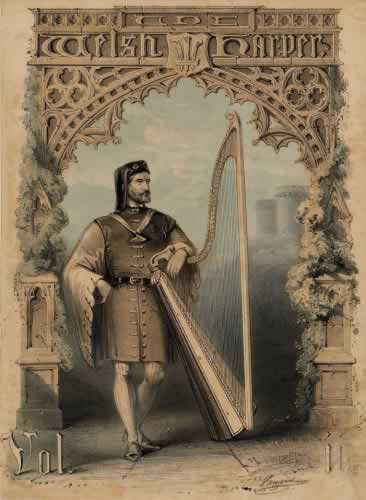
An anonymous 19th century imaginary portrait of Dafydd ap Gwilym.

"The Girls of Llanbadarn", or "The Ladies of Llanbadarn" (Welsh: Merched Llanbadarn), is a short, wryly humorous poem by the 14th-century Welsh poet Dafydd ap Gwilym, in which he mocks his own lack of success with the girls of his neighbourhood. Dafydd is widely seen as the greatest of the Welsh poets, and this is one of his best-known works. The poem cannot be precisely dated, but was perhaps written in the 1340s.

== Summary ==
Dafydd curses the women of his parish, lamenting his lack of success with them. He ponders what flaw exists in him or them that none will meet him in the woods. Comparing himself to Garwy, he admits to always being in love with some girl but never winning her heart. He confesses that every Sunday, he sits in church, turning his head away from the altar to stare at some girl. Dafydd imagines such a woman gossiping about his appearance and character with her friends. The poet ultimately concludes that he must abandon these pursuits and live as a hermit, since despite his persistent ogling, he remains without a girl.

== Commentary ==
Dafydd often refers to Llanbadarn in his poems, reflecting the fact that he was born at Brogynin, in the parish of Llanbadarn Fawr, and lived there for many years. He shows his knowledge of Welsh legend with his reference to Garwy Hir, who was renowned as a lover, and whose daughter, Indeg, was herself loved by King Arthur. The line in which the poet is said to be "Pale and with his sister's hair" are consistent with a third-hand description of Dafydd given in a 16th-century document: "tall and slender, with long curly yellow hair, full of silver clasps and rings". It has been suggested that the first of Dafydd's two disparagers is the woman whom in many other poems he calls Morfudd, the object of his often rejected devotion.

== Theme and analogues ==
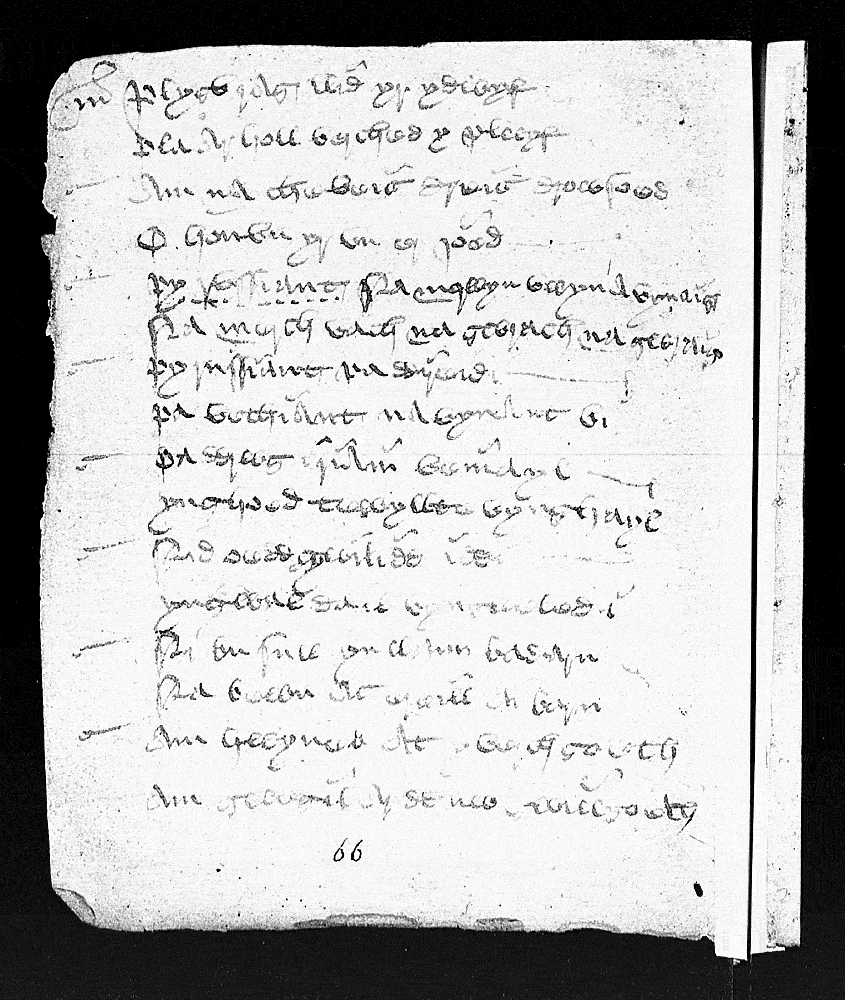
The first few lines of the poem in Peniarth MS 54, a manuscript dating from c. 1480.

The poem's theme, Dafydd's habitual failure in love, is a very common one in his work. As the novelist and scholar Gwyn Jones wrote:

No lover in any language, and certainly no poet, has confessed to missing the mark more often than Dafydd ap Gwilym. Uncooperative husbands, quick-triggered alarms, crones and walls, strong locks, floods and fogs and bogs and dogs are for ever interposing themselves between him and golden-haired Morfudd, black-browed Dyddgu, or Gwen the infinitely fair. But a great trier, even in church.

Parallels to Dafydd's amused and ironic reportage of his own inadequacies can be found in Chaucer's works, and elsewhere in medieval literature; also in the poems of Dafydd's avowed model Ovid. But Dafydd is also, more seriously, pointing up the superficiality of the girls' criticism of his appearance as compared with an implied judgement of his true worth.

== Poetic art ==
In common with other Middle Welsh poems of the form called cywyddau "The Girls of Llanbadarn" follows complex rules of construction. It uses the system of alliteration and internal rhyme known as cynghanedd, except in the lines recording the comments of the two girls, where, in contrast with the rest of the poem, the diction is plain and conversational. Sangiad, the breaking-up of the syntactical structure of the sentence, is used in most of the poem. The scholar Joseph Clancy illustrated this with a literal translation of the last lines, in which the second half of each line interrupts the narrative flow with the poet's commentary on it:

From too much looking, strange lesson,
Backwards, sight of weakness,
It happened to me, strong song's friend,
To bow my head without one companion.

== Influence ==
The 20th-century Welsh poet Raymond Garlick wrote a poem, "Llanbadarn Etc.", inspired by "The Girls of Llanbadarn" and addressed to a contemporary who, though displaying behaviour similar to that depicted in Dafydd ap Gwilym's poem, has

no words now to crown it with
or turn it to a cywydd.

== English translations and paraphrases ==
- Bell, H. Idris, in Bell, H. Idris; Bell, David (1942). Fifty Poems. Y Cymmrodor, vol. 48. London: Honourable Society of Cymmrodorion. pp. 197, 199. With the Middle Welsh original in parallel text.
- Bollard, John K., ed. (2019). Cymru Dafydd ap Gwilym/Dafydd ap Gwilym's Wales: Cerddi a Lleoedd/Poems and Places. Dyffryn Conwy: Gwasg Carreg Gwalch. pp. 52–53. ISBN 9781845277192. With the Middle Welsh original in parallel text.
- Bromwich, Rachel, ed. (1985) [1982]. Dafydd ap Gwilym: A Selection of Poems. Harmondsworth: Penguin. pp. 136, 138. ISBN 0140076131. With the Middle Welsh original in parallel text.
- Clancy, Joseph P. (1965). Medieval Welsh Lyrics. London: Macmillan. pp. 29–30.
  - Rev. repr. in his The Poems of Dafydd ap Gwilym. Bath: Brown Dog. 2016. pp. 39–40. ISBN 9781785450891.
- Conran, Anthony; Williams, J. E. Caerwyn, eds. (1967). The Penguin Book of Welsh Verse. Harmondsworth: Penguin. pp. 141–142.
- Edwards, Huw Meirion. At "137 - Merched Llanbadarn". Gwaith Dafydd ap Gwilym. Welsh Department, Swansea University. With the Middle Welsh original.
- Ford, Patrick K., ed. (1999). The Celtic Poets: Songs and Tales from Early Ireland and Wales. Belmont, Mass.: Ford & Bailie. pp. 292–293. ISBN 9780926689053.
- Green, Martin (1993). Homage to Dafydd ap Gwilym. Lewiston/Queenston/Lampeter: The Edwin Mellen Press. pp. 22–23. ISBN 0773493182.
- Gurney, Robert, ed. (1969). Bardic Heritage. London: Chatto & Windus. pp. 74–75. ISBN 0701113286.
- Heseltine, Nigel, ed. (1968) [1944]. Twenty-Five Poems by Dafydd ap Gwilym. Banbury: Piers Press. pp. 31–32.
- Humphreys, Nigel (2015). Edmunds, Catherine (ed.). The Love Song of Daphnis & Chloe and 5 Dafydd ap Gwilym Poems (c1320 to c1370). Hastings: Circaidy Gregory Press. pp. 128–129. ISBN 9781906451882.
- Humphries, Rolfe. "Dafydd ap Gwilym gives up on the girls from Llanbadarn". The Colorado Quarterly. 7 (1): 33–34. Summer 1958.
  - Repr. in his Collected Poems. Bloomington: Indiana University Press. 1965. pp. 256–257.
- Jackson, Kenneth Hurlstone, ed. (1971) [1951]. A Celtic Miscellany. Harmondsworth: Penguin. pp. 209–210. ISBN 0140442472.
- Jones, Glyn (1996). Stephens, Meic (ed.). The Collected Poems of Glyn Jones. Cardiff: University of Wales Press. pp. 225–226. ISBN 0708313884.
- Lofmark, Carl (1989). Bards and Heroes. Felinferch: Llanerch. pp. 97–98. ISBN 0947992340.
- Loomis, Richard Morgan, ed. (1982). Dafydd ap Gwilym: The Poems. Binghamton: Center for Medieval & Early Renaissance Studies. pp. 125–126. ISBN 0866980156.
  - Rev repr. in Loomis, Richard; Johnston, Dafydd (1992). Medieval Welsh Poems. Binghamton: Medieval & Renaissance Texts & Studies. pp. 64–66. ISBN 0866981020.
- Merchant, Paul (2006). Some Business of Affinity. Hereford: Five Seasons Press. pp. 111–112. ISBN 0947960392.
  - Rev. repr. in Unless She Beckons: Poems of Dafydd ap Gwilym. Translated by Merchant, Paul; Faletra, Michael. La Grande, Oregon: Redbat. 2018. pp. 25, 27. ISBN 9780997154993. With the Middle Welsh original in parallel text.
- Norris, Leslie (1996). Collected Poems. Bridgend: Seren. pp. 159–160. ISBN 1854111329.
- Thomas, Gwyn, ed. (2001). Dafydd ap Gwilym: His Poems. Cardiff: University of Wales Press. pp. 101–102. ISBN 0708316646.
- Walters, Bryan (1977). From the Welsh. Aberystwyth: Celtion. pp. 10, 12. ISBN 0860530086.
- Watson, Giles (2016). Rivals of Dafydd ap Gwilym: A Treasury of Fourteenth and Fifteenth Century Welsh Verse. npp: pp. pp. 8–9. ISBN 9781326900458.
- Webb, Harri (1995). Stephens, Meic (ed.). Collected Poems. Llandysul: Gomer. pp. 178–179. ISBN 1859022995.
- Williams, Gwyn, ed. (1956). The Burning Tree. London: Faber and Faber. pp. 93–95.
- Wood, John (1997). The Gates of the Elect Kingdom. Iowa City: University of Iowa Press. pp. 40–41. ISBN 0877455813. Archived from the original on 29 June 2010.
