= The Mirror (poem) =

14th century Welsh poem

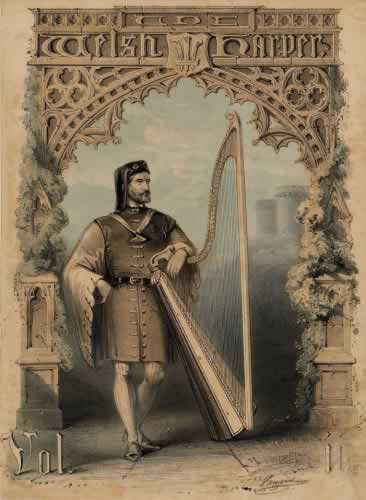
An anonymous 19th century imaginary portrait of Dafydd ap Gwilym.

"The Mirror" (Welsh: Y Drych) is a poem in the form of a cywydd by the 14th-century bard Dafydd ap Gwilym, widely seen as the greatest of the Welsh poets. The poem describes how Dafydd, languishing with lovesickness for an unnamed Gwynedd woman, is appalled by the wasted appearance of his face in the mirror. "The Mirror" can be grouped with several other of Dafydd's poems, possibly early ones, set in Gwynedd, or alternatively with the many poems in which he expresses his love for a woman he calls Morfudd. It has been called "perhaps Dafydd's greatest masterpiece in the genre of self-deprecation".

== Summary ==
Much to his surprise the poet's mirror has told him that he is not handsome but – on account of a girl – sallow-faced, sharp-nosed and hollow-eyed, and his hair is falling out. He either longs for his own death or wishes ill on the mirror, depending on which of the two is at fault. The mirror is the work of magicians, and he calls it "cold traitor, brother to the ice". To hell with it! But if he can after all believe the mirror then the culprit is a girl in Gwynedd, for "there they know how to spoil a man's looks".

== Manuscripts ==
More than 30 manuscripts of this poem are known. These can be divided into two groups, one giving the northern version of the poem and the other giving the White Book of Hergest version. Among the manuscripts of the northern version are Hafod 26, dating from about 1574, which was the work of the Conwy valley lexicographer Thomas Wiliems; and Cardiff 2.114, dating from between 1564 and 1566, which originated at the court of Roland Meyrick, Bishop of Bangor. The other group of manuscripts, giving a text of the poem that derives from the now-lost 15th-century White Book of Hergest, include Peniarth 49, compiled over a long period in the early 17th century by John Davies of Mallwyd, and Wynnstay 2, a mid-17th century manuscript by William Bodwrda.

== The mirror in the poem ==
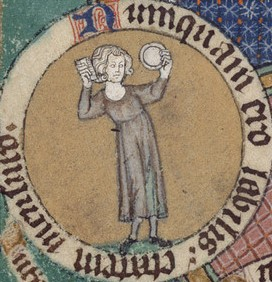
Detail of an illumination from the 14th-century De Lisle Psalter, BL Arundel MS 83, f.126v. It depicts a young man using a comb and a hand mirror of the kind Dafydd describes in this poem.

The mirror described in the poem is probably a hand mirror such as young people were, in Dafydd's time, stereotypically thought of as using. The material of which it is made is not stated. Most medieval mirrors were made of polished metal, but it is certain that Dafydd had seen the glass variety since in another of his poems, "The Ice", he described icebergs as "mirrors of glass", and in "The Poet's Hair", a work doubtfully ascribed to Dafydd, the poet refers to a glass mirror. In "The Mirror" Dafydd's speculation that his reflection has been distorted for the worse is quite natural since medieval mirrors, whether of metal or of glass, gave far from perfect reflections.

== Analogues and literary references ==
Mirrors are a common subject of medieval poetry. Sometimes the poet asserts the magical nature of mirrors, or is drawn by the insubstantial nature of the reflected image to consider the relationship between the body and the soul. Sometimes, as here, the mirror forces him to contemplate the ageing of his own face. One classical treatment of the theme, in the Odes of Horace (IV.10), is close enough to Dafydd's to have led the 18th/19th century writer Eliezer Williams to call "The Mirror" a paraphrase of Horace's ode. Two lines of Dafydd's poem in which he compares the mirror to the moon and to a lodestone closely parallel two lines attributed in some manuscripts to his friend and fellow-bard Madog Benfras. It is not certain which couplet influenced the other, though recent textual criticism suggests that Dafydd's lines were introduced into a corrupt text of Madog's poem, Madog's original being somewhat different.

Dafydd attributes his plight to a girl whom he compares to the heroine of one of Three Welsh Romances in the Mabinogion. The northern manuscripts of the poem describe her as a second Enid, who appears in Geraint son of Erbin, but the White Book of Hergest manuscripts compare her instead to Luned, heroine of The Lady of the Fountain. Each of these names appears in several other poems by Dafydd ap Gwilym, used as a standard of comparison for beauty. The 1952 edition of Dafydd's works by Thomas Parry opts for the reading Enid, but the 2010 edition by Dafydd Johnston et al. prefers Luned.

== Editions ==
- Williams, Ifor; Roberts, Thomas, eds. (1935) [1914]. Cywyddau Dafydd ap Gwilym a'i Gyfoeswyr. Caerdydd: Gwasg Prifysgol Cymru. pp. 94–95.
- Parry, Thomas, ed. (1952). Gwaith Dafydd ap Gwilym. Caerdydd: Gwasg Prifysgol Cymru. pp. 283–284.
- Johnston, Dafydd (ed.). "132 - Y Drych". Gwaith Dafydd ap Gwilym. Welsh Department, Swansea University.

== Translations and paraphrases ==
- Bromwich, Rachel, ed. (1982). Dafydd ap Gwilym: A Selection of Poems. Llandysul: Gomer Press. pp. 188, 190. ISBN 0850888158. With the Middle Welsh original in parallel text.
- Clancy, Joseph P. (1965). Medieval Welsh Lyrics. London: Macmillan. pp. 62–63.
  - Rev. repr. in his The Poems of Dafydd ap Gwilym. Bath: Brown Dog. 2016. pp. 80–81. ISBN 9781785450891.
- Evans, Dylan Foster (2007). "Testun Golygedig: 132 - Y Drych". Gwaith Dafydd ap Gwilym. Welsh Department, Swansea University. With the Middle Welsh original in parallel text.
- Ford, Patrick K., ed. (1999). The Celtic Poets: Songs and Tales from Early Ireland and Wales. Belmont, Mass.: Ford & Bailie. pp. 294–295. ISBN 9780926689053.
- Gurney, Robert, ed. (1969). Bardic Heritage. London: Chatto & Windus. p. 117. ISBN 0701113286.
- Heseltine, Nigel, ed. (1968) [1944]. Twenty-Five Poems by Dafydd ap Gwilym. Banbury: Piers Press. p. 54. ISBN 9780950355801.
- Humphries, Rolfe (1969). Nine Thorny Thickets. Kent, Ohio: Kent State University Press. p. 59. ISBN 9780873380393.
- Huws, Daniel (1998). "The Mirror". World Poetry: An Anthology of Verse from Antiquity to Our Time. By Washburn, Katharine; Major, John S.; Fadimon, Clifton. New York: W. W. Norton. pp. 447–448. ISBN 0393041301.
- [Johnes, Arthur James] (1834). Translations into English Verse from the Poems of Davyth ap Gwilym. London: Henry Hooper. pp. 94–95.
- Lofmark, Carl (1989). Bards and Heroes. Felinferch: Llanerch. p. 96. ISBN 0947992340.
- Loomis, Richard Morgan, ed. (1982). Dafydd ap Gwilym: The Poems. Binghamton: Center for Medieval & Early Renaissance Studies. pp. 207–209. ISBN 0866980156.
  - Rev. repr. in Loomis, Richard; Johnston, Dafydd (1992). Medieval Welsh Poems. Binghamton: Medieval & Renaissance Texts & Studies. p. 76. ISBN 0866981020.
- Merchant, Paul; Faletra, Michael (2018). Unless She Beckons: Poems of Dafydd ap Gwilym. La Grande, Oregon: Redbat. pp. 91, 93, 95. ISBN 9780997154993. With the Middle Welsh original in parallel text.
- Thomas, Gwyn, ed. (2001). Dafydd ap Gwilym: His Poems. Cardiff: University of Wales Press. pp. 208–209. ISBN 0708316646.
- Watson, Giles (2014). Dafydd ap Gwilym: Paraphrases and Palimpsests. npp. pp. 170–171. ISBN 9781291866803.
- Wood, John (1997). The Gates of the Elect Kingdom. Iowa City: University of Iowa Press. pp. 39–40. ISBN 0877455813. Archived from the original on 29 June 2010. Abridged translation.
