= The Dream (Dafydd ap Gwilym poem) =

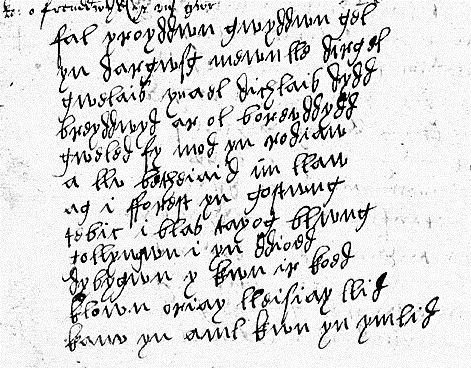
The first twelve lines of "The Dream" in its earliest manuscript, National Library of Wales MS 3057D (Mostyn 161), c. 1560.

"The Dream" (Welsh: Y Breuddwyd) is a medieval Welsh poem in the form of a cywydd. Though it is included in both of the modern editions of the works of Dafydd ap Gwilym, widely seen as the greatest of the Welsh poets, it is not typical of his work and doubts have been expressed as to his authorship. The poet's dream is an allegorical one about hunting a white doe in which the doe represents the woman he loves. The large number of manuscripts and of English translations testify to its popularity through the centuries.

== Summary ==
Sleeping, the poet dreams that he has released his greyhounds in a wood and that they have found and pursued a white doe over mountainous terrain. The doe comes to the poet for protection, and he wakes up. When day breaks he seeks out a wise old woman and asks her to interpret his dream. She tells him that the dream is a good omen: the hounds were his llateion (love-messengers), and the doe was the lady he loves, who will turn to him at last.

== Manuscripts ==
"The Dream" survives in as many as 35 manuscripts, though none of them date from before the middle of the 16th century, most being 17th or 18th century. Some preserve the poem in incomplete forms, omitting up to 12 of its 42 lines. Amongst the key manuscripts are National Library of Wales MS 3057D (Mostyn 161), a collection of poetry made in the Conwy Valley sometime between 1558 and 1563, perhaps for the Gwydir family; Cardiff Central Library MS 4.330 (Hafod 26), a collection of most of Dafydd ap Gwilym's poems (along with some by other poets) made in the Conwy Valley about 1574 by the lexicographer Thomas Wiliems; and British Library MS Stowe 959 (BM 48), which was made in Carmarthenshire c. 1600.

== Attribution ==
Every manuscript of "The Dream" attributes it to Dafydd ap Gwilym apart from one, which gives it no attribution. Thomas Parry accepted it into his 1952 edition of Dafydd's poems without question, and it is likewise included in the 2007 online edition by Dafydd Johnston et al. as being one of the 147 poems in the Dafydd ap Gwilym canon rather than one of the 20 whose authorship it considers doubtful. Yet this attribution is acknowledged to be problematic. The vocabulary of the poem is quite simple, no compound words being used, and so is the style: there is nowhere any ambiguity or depth of meaning. This is not typical of Dafydd, and Johnston has admitted that "it might well be the work of another poet".

== Analogues ==
The poem combines two motifs well-established in Celtic and wider Western literature.

Plato used the metaphor of the hunt when writing about the lover's pursuit. In later works the deer sometimes represents the poet, as in Ideas Mirrour, a 16th-century poem by Michael Drayton, and sometimes it is the beloved, as in the 13th-century French poem, Li dis dou cerf amoreus, and in one passage (lines 1527–1535) of Chaucer's Troilus and Criseyde. In earlier Welsh literature, as in Dafydd's poem, the object of the hunt is often a white doe.

The dream of the beloved was a motif used in another of Dafydd's poems, "The Clock". It was famously the basis of Le Roman de la Rose, but is older than that. Such a dream, together with an interpretation by an old crone, appears in Walther von der Vogelweide's Dô der sumer komen was, and as far back as Ovid's Amores. A dream of the beloved is even presented in conjunction with a hunting scene in the Mabinogion's Dream of Macsen.

== Editions ==
- Williams, Ifor; Roberts, Thomas, eds. (1935) [1914]. Cywyddau Dafydd ap Gwilym a'i Gyfoeswyr. Caerdydd: Gwasg Prifysgol Cymru. pp. 61–62.
- Parry, Thomas, ed. (1952). Gwaith Dafydd ap Gwilym. Caerdydd: Gwasg Prifysgol Cymru. pp. 107–109.
- Lake, A. Cynfael, ed. (2007). "79 – Y Breuddwyd". Dafydd ap Gwilym.net. Welsh Department, Swansea University/Centre for Advanced Welsh and Celtic Studies.

== Translations and paraphrases ==
- Bell, H. Idris, in Bell, H. Idris; Bell, David (1942). Fifty Poems. Y Cymmrodor, vol. 48. London: Honourable Society of Cymmrodorion. pp. 165, 167. With the Middle Welsh original in parallel text.
- Bromwich, Rachel, ed. (1982). Dafydd ap Gwilym: A Selection of Poems. Llandysul: Gomer Press. pp. 108, 110. ISBN 0850888158. With the Middle Welsh original in parallel text.
- Clancy, Joseph P. (1965). Medieval Welsh Lyrics. London: Macmillan. pp. 43–44.
- Clancy, Joseph P. (2016). The Poems of Dafydd ap Gwilym. Bath: Brown Dog. pp. 136–137. ISBN 9781785450891.
- Gurney, Robert, ed. (1969). Bardic Heritage. London: Chatto & Windus. pp. 101–103. ISBN 0701113286.
- Humphries, Rolfe (1969). Nine Thorny Thickets. Kent, OH: Kent State University Press. p. 15. ISBN 9780873380393.
- Lake, A. Cynfael (2007). "Edited Text: 79 - Y Breuddwyd. English Translation: 79 - Y Breuddwyd". Dafydd ap Gwilym.net. Welsh Department, Swansea University/Centre for Advanced Welsh and Celtic Studies.
- Loomis, Richard Morgan, ed. (1982). Dafydd ap Gwilym: The Poems. Binghamton: Center for Medieval & Early Renaissance Studies. pp. 112–113. ISBN 0866980156.
- Merchant, Paul; Faletra, Michael (2018). Unless She Beckons: Poems of Dafydd ap Gwilym. La Grande, Oregon: Redbat. pp. 33, 35. ISBN 9780997154993. With the Middle Welsh original in parallel text.
- Thomas, Gwyn, ed. (2001). Dafydd ap Gwilym: His Poems. Cardiff: University of Wales Press. pp. 82–83. ISBN 0708316646.
- Watson, Giles (2014). Dafydd ap Gwilym: Paraphrases and Palimpsests. npp. p. 62. ISBN 9781291866803.
