= The Woodland Mass =

Poem by Dafydd ap Gwilym

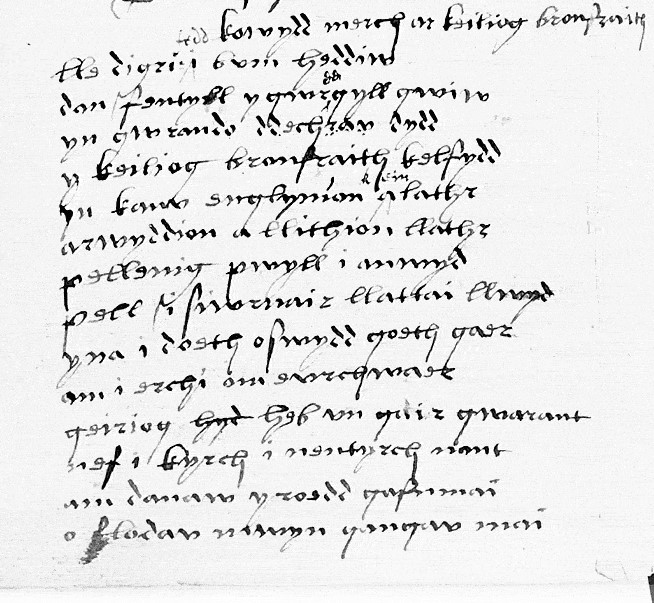
The opening of "The Woodland Mass" in a 16th-century manuscript, the Llyfr Ficer Woking

"The Woodland Mass" or "The Mass of the Grove" (Welsh: Offeren y Llwyn) is a poem in the form of a cywydd by the 14th-century bard Dafydd ap Gwilym, widely seen as the greatest of the Welsh poets. It is one of his most popular works. Sometimes seen as blasphemous, it presents a woodland scene in which a thrush, sent by the poet's lover, and a nightingale officiate at a Mass celebrating both God and sexual love. "The Woodland Mass" is an example of a common type of medieval Welsh poem in which some bird or beast is used as a llatai or love-messenger, though this poem is unusual in that the message is sent to Dafydd rather than by him.

== Synopsis ==
At daybreak in the woods the poet listens to the prophecies and lessons sung by a cock-thrush which has been sent from afar by the poet's lover, Morfudd. The thrush wears an alb of flowers and a chasuble of the wind's wings; the altar's covering is of gold. The poet hears the Gospel being read clearly and well. A nightingale's singing is the sanctus bell and a leaf is the Host, which the nightingale holds up to the sky in adoration of God, along with "a chalice of passion and love". The poet is well pleased with this woodland music.

== Manuscripts ==
The poem survives in 23 manuscripts. Among the key early manuscripts are Cardiff 2.114 (C 7), also called the Llyfr Ficer Woking, written 1564–1566 at the court of Rowland Meyrick, Bishop of Bangor; Bangor (Mostyn) 17, from the late 16th century; Hafod 26, also known as Cardiff 4.330, written by Thomas Wiliems around 1574; Llansteffan 120, written by Jaspar Gryffyth between about 1597 and 1607; Peniarth 49, written by John Davies in the early 17th century; and Mostyn 212, dating from the first half of the 17th century.

== Themes ==
"The Woodland Mass" begins as a poem simply in praise of nature, but as the poet describes the song of the thrush he develops a metaphor in which the thrush becomes the celebrant of a Mass and the nightingale his acolyte, while the woodland flowers and leaves become vestments and Host. Controversially, this Mass combines conventional spirituality with a celebration of sexual love, and indeed of love between the poet and a married woman, in a way which some translators have preferred to obscure. The tension of the poem comes from the balance of these two elements, sacred and profane, both being treated as reflections of God's love. Some critics have judged the poem to be blasphemous, but for others it is a hymn to God, showing us "the immanence of God and...the universality of worship", and challenging not religion itself but only the ultra-ascetic variety of it espoused by the poem's grey friar and others of his kind. Every reader will decide for himself whether the poem is orthodox or heretical.

== Setting ==
The poem tells us that the thrush was sent from swydd goeth Gaer, a phrase which scholars have interpreted variously. Ifor Williams and Thomas Parry were agreed in taking it to be Carmarthenshire, but it has alternatively been argued that it can be translated as the earldom of Chester, or, if a variant reading be accepted, the county of Caerleon. There is also disagreement about the word geiriog, two lines later. R. Geraint Gruffydd suggested that it was the name Ceirio, referring to a place in northern Ceredigion, and that the thrush was sent there, but Rachel Bromwich considered it to be the adjectival form of the noun gair, and translated it "with eloquence". The thrush's course is directed, according to the poem, i Nentyrch. W. J. Gruffydd identified this with Nannerch in Clwyd; Ifor Williams treated it as a corruption of yn entyrch, "to the upper part of the valley"; and R. Geraint Gruffydd called it an unidentified place-name.

== Analogues ==
"The Woodland Mass" resembles several other poems by Dafydd in presenting woodland creatures and other natural objects as human figures, or in showing them praising God. Its use of religious language to describe secular matters can be paralleled in other poems of Dafydd's, and also more widely in works that have been attributed to wandering scholars. More specifically, comparisons between birdsong and Christian liturgy appear quite commonly in medieval literature, one striking example being La Messe des Oiseaux by the 14th-century French poet Jean de Condé, which presents a nightingale in a woodland setting celebrating a Mass assisted by various other birds, including a thrush, and in which the poet even, like Dafydd, shows the elevation of the Host, here a red rose rather than Dafydd's leaf. Rachel Bromwich, while noting the similarities between the two, thought that the influence of Jean de Condé's poem on "The Woodland Mass" was probably "contributory and indirect rather than literary and direct".

== Influence ==
Padraic Colum's poem "David ap Gwillam at the Mass of the Birds", published in his collection Creatures (1927), recreates the scene described in "The Woodland Mass". "Ascension Thursday" and "The Pine", poems by Saunders Lewis, also treats of the Mass in terms of praise springing from the natural world while including many allusions to "The Woodland Mass".

== Musical settings ==
The Scottish composer John Hearne's Offeren y Llwyn or Woodland Worship (1958) is a cantata for chorus and strings, setting Dafydd's poem in the original Welsh and in an alternative English version. Jeffrey Lewis's "The Woodland Mass", a short choral setting, dates from 1976. The folk duo Bragod, comprising Mary-Anne Roberts and Robert Evans, included on their album Llatai a performance of Dafydd's poem to music drawn from the works of the 17th-century harpist Robert ap Huw.

== Editions ==
- Williams, Ifor; Roberts, Thomas, eds. (1935) [1914]. Cywyddau Dafydd ap Gwilym a'i Gyfoeswyr. Caerdydd: Gwasg Prifysgol Cymru. p. 57.
- Parry, Thomas, ed. (1952). Gwaith Dafydd ap Gwilym. Caerdydd: Gwasg Prifysgol Cymru. pp. 323–324.
- Johnston, Dafydd (ed.). "39 - Offeren y Llwyn". Gwaith Dafydd ap Gwilym. Welsh Department, Swansea University.

== English translations and paraphrases ==
- Anonymous (July 1907). "The Thrush and Nightingale". The Nationalist. 1 (5): 32.
- Bell, H. Idris, in Bell, H. Idris; Bell, David (1942). Fifty Poems. Y Cymmrodor, vol. 48. London: Honourable Society of Cymmrodorion. pp. 263, 265. With the Middle Welsh original in parallel text.
- Bollard, John K., ed. (2019). Cymru Dafydd ap Gwilym/Dafydd ap Gwilym's Wales: Cerddi a Lleoedd/Poems and Places. Dyffryn Conwy: Gwasg Carreg Gwalch. pp. 22–23. ISBN 9781845277192. With the Middle Welsh original in parallel text.
- Bromwich, Rachel, ed. (1982). Dafydd ap Gwilym: A Selection of Poems. Llandysul: Gomer Press. pp. 78, 80. ISBN 0850888158. With the Middle Welsh original in parallel text.
- Clancy, Joseph P. (1965). Medieval Welsh Lyrics. London: Macmillan. pp. 49–50.
  - Rev. repr. in his The Poems of Dafydd ap Gwilym. Bath: Brown Dog. 2016. pp. 177–178. ISBN 9781785450891.
- Cynddelw, ed. (1873). Barddoniaeth Dafydd ab Gwilym. Liverpool: I. Foulkes. pp. 391–392.
- Ford, Patrick K., ed. (1999). The Celtic Poets: Songs and Tales from Early Ireland and Wales. Belmont, Mass.: Ford & Bailie. pp. 273–274. ISBN 9780926689053.
- Gurney, Robert, ed. (1969). Bardic Heritage. London: Chatto & Windus. pp. 92–93. ISBN 0701113286. Abridged translation.
- Johnes, Arthur James (1834). Translations into English Verse from the Poems of Davyth ap Gwilym. London: Henry Hooper. pp. 31–32.
- Johnston, Dafydd. "39 - Offeren y Llwyn". Gwaith Dafydd ap Gwilym. Welsh Department, Swansea University.
- Lewes, Evelyn (1914). Life and Poems of Dafydd ap Gwilym. London: David Nutt. pp. 121–122.
- Loomis, Richard Morgan, ed. (1982). Dafydd ap Gwilym: The Poems. Binghamton: Center for Medieval & Early Renaissance Studies. pp. 227–228. ISBN 0866980156.
  - Rev. repr. in Loomis, Richard; Johnston, Dafydd (1992). Medieval Welsh Poems. Binghamton: Medieval & Renaissance Texts & Studies. pp. 46–47. ISBN 0866981020.
- M., J. C. [James Clarence Mangan] (September 1847). "The Mass of the Birds". The Dublin University Magazine. 30 (177): 324–325.
- Merchant, Paul (2006). Some Business of Affinity. Hereford: Five Seasons Press. p. 117. ISBN 0947960392.
  - Rev. repr. in Unless She Beckons: Poems of Dafydd ap Gwilym. Translated by Merchant, Paul; Faletra, Michael. La Grande, Oregon: Redbat. 2018. pp. 45, 47. ISBN 9780997154993. With the Middle Welsh original in parallel text.
- Roush, Jon, in Humphries, Rolfe (1969). Nine Thorny Thickets. Kent, Ohio: Kent State University Press. pp. 72–73. ISBN 9780873380393.
- Thomas, Gwyn, ed. (2001). Dafydd ap Gwilym: His Poems. Cardiff: University of Wales Press. p. 237. ISBN 0708316646.
- Watson, Giles (2014). Dafydd ap Gwilym: Paraphrases and Palimpsests. npp: pp. p. 56. ISBN 9781291866803.
- Williams, Gwyn, ed. (1976) [1959]. Presenting Welsh Poetry: An Anthology of Welsh Verse in Translation and of English Verse by Welsh Poets. Miami: Granger. pp. 28–29.
  - Rev. repr. in Williams, Gwyn, ed. (1974) [1973]. Welsh Poems: Sixth Century to 1600. Berkeley: University of California Press. pp. 50–51. ISBN 9780520026032.
