= The Poet and the Grey Friar =

Poem by Dafydd ap Gwilym

"The Poet and the Grey Friar" (Welsh: Y Bardd a'r Brawd Llwyd) is a satirical poem in the form of a traethodl by the 14th-century Welsh poet Dafydd ap Gwilym, widely seen as the greatest of the Welsh-language poets. In it he relates an imaginary conversation with a Franciscan friar in which, rejecting the ascetic philosophy of the friar, he sets out a defence of love, poetry and the worldly life. It was included in The Oxford Book of Welsh Verse and The Penguin Book of Welsh Verse.

== Synopsis ==
Lamenting that "my glorious girl who holds her court in the woods" knows nothing of his confession to a grey friar, the poet goes on to recount how he described her as the lady he has long unavailingly loved and celebrated in his poems. The friar replied that the poet's soul is in peril if he does not turn to his prayers rather than his songs; the minstrel's art, he said, is a dangerous vanity which leads the souls of men and women to the Devil. The poet protested that "God is not so cruel as the old folk say, God will not damn the soul of a gallant gentleman for loving woman nor maid". A woman is "the fairest flower in Heaven beside God Himself". Delight comes from Heaven, grief from hell, while song makes everyone happier. The poet is only performing his proper function, for are not hymns, sequences and the Psalms of David nothing but poems addressed to God? God has ordained a time for preaching and a time for singing. "When everyone is as ready to listen to prayers with the harp as the girls of North Wales are to hear wanton poems, then, by my hand, I shall sing my paternoster without cease. Till then, shame on Dafydd if he sings any prayers but love-songs!".

== Manuscripts ==
"The Poet and the Grey Friar" survives in 33 manuscripts. Among the key early manuscripts are Peniarth 76 (written around the middle of the 16th century); Cardiff 5.10ii (written by Edward Kyffin between 1570 and 1580); Hafod 26, also known as Cardiff 4.330 (written by Thomas Wiliems around 1574); Llansteffan 120 (written by Jaspar Gryffyth between about 1597 and 1607); and Peniarth 49 (written by John Davies in the early 17th century). Some later manuscripts add to the authentic text of the poem six further lines which are certainly not of Davydd ap Gwilym's authorship.

== Themes ==
"The Poet and the Grey Friar" is one of four poems by Dafydd – the others are "The Grey Friar's Advice", "The Black Friar's Warning", and "Morfudd Grown Old" – in which friars are presented as condemning illicit love. The poem can be seen as setting up Dafydd's own affirmation of the values of youth, worldly joys, and the sensual life in opposition to the moral system of the Church, and particularly of the mendicant orders, with their disparagement of women and poets. However, Dafydd also wrote devotional poems, and it is possible that he did not entirely dissent from the friar's view of life. Satirical though Dafydd's intent may have been, perhaps his poem shows that the worldly life and the Christian's obligations to God can be reconciled, and that the poet's differences with the friar are not unbridgeable.

== Sources and analogues ==
Criticism of the mendicant orders can be traced back to the work of the 13th-century French trouvère Rutebeuf, which itself reflects the University of Paris's resistance to the increasing power of the friars. One poem by Dafydd's older contemporary Jean de Condé not only defends the minstrels from the criticisms of greedy and hypocritical friars but also cites approvingly, as Dafydd does, the example of the psalmist King David. Anti-mendicant sentiments also appear in the works of the 14th century English poets Geoffrey Chaucer and William Langland, and of the Welsh bard Iolo Goch.

Dafydd draws on the Bible for his statement that "every man of all the nations was born of woman, except three", those exceptions being Adam, Eve, and, according to Ifor Williams, Melchizedek. The poem also alludes to the well-known Biblical texts beginning "Man does not live by bread alone" (Deuteronomy 8:3, Matthew 4:4, and Luke 4:4) and "To every thing there is a season" (Ecclesiastes 3:1).

Dafydd quotes a Welsh proverb, "A glad face makes a full house, a sad face comes to no good", which appears in the Red Book of Hergest. He also makes use of a triad not otherwise recorded: "Three things are loved throughout the world – woman, fair weather, and good health". He may have taken this from some lost source, but it is also possible that he simply invented it.

== Versification ==
"The Poet and the Grey Friar" is composed to couplets of 7-syllable lines, like the cywydd, Dafydd's usual measure. However, this poem is considered to be not a cywydd, but a traethodl, a more popular verse-form such as friars used for religious instruction. The cywydd is thought to have evolved out of the traethodl, which is a looser and less demanding form. The rhyming of stressed with unstressed syllables, obligatory in the cywydd, is optional in the traethodl. Of the 44 couplets in "The Poet and the Grey Friar" 25 rhyme this way, while 19 have both rhymes unstressed. (No couplets, however, have both rhymes stressed.) Cynghanedd, the strict system of internal rhyme and alliteration almost always found in the cywydd, appears here in five lines only. Hence it is possible to see this poem as a stage in the evolution of the cywydd.

== English translations and paraphrases ==
- Anonymous (1818). "Poems. Translated from the Welsh of Dafydd ab Gwilym". Cambrian Register. 3: 446–450.
- Bell, H. Idris, in Bell, H. Idris; Bell, David (1942). Fifty Poems. Y Cymmrodor, vol. 48. London: Honourable Society of Cymmrodorion. pp. 155, 157, 159, 161. With the Middle Welsh original in parallel text.
- Bollard, John K., ed. (2019). Cymru Dafydd ap Gwilym/Dafydd ap Gwilym's Wales: Cerddi a Lleoedd/Poems and Places. Dyffryn Conwy: Gwasg Carreg Gwalch. pp. 78, 80–81. ISBN 9781845277192. With the Middle Welsh original in parallel text.
- Bromwich, Rachel, ed. (1982). Dafydd ap Gwilym: A Selection of Poems. Llandysul: Gomer Press. pp. 150, 152. ISBN 0850888158. With the Middle Welsh original in parallel text.
- Clancy, Joseph P. (1965). Medieval Welsh Lyrics. London: Macmillan. pp. 38–40.
  - Rev. repr. in his The Poems of Dafydd ap Gwilym. Bath: Brown Dog. 2016. pp. 151–153. ISBN 9781785450891.
- Conran, Anthony; Williams, J. E. Caerwyn, eds. (1967). The Penguin Book of Welsh Verse. Harmondsworth: Penguin. pp. 137–139. ISBN 9780140420968.
  - Rev. repr. in Conran, Tony (1986). Welsh Verse. Bridgend: Seren. pp. 169–171. ISBN 1854110810.
- Ford, Patrick K., ed. (1999). The Celtic Poets: Songs and Tales from Early Ireland and Wales. Belmont, Mass.: Ford & Bailie. pp. 311–314. ISBN 9780926689053.
- Green, Martin (1993). Homage to Dafydd ap Gwilym. Lewiston/Queenston/Lampeter: The Edwin Mellen Press. pp. 26–29. ISBN 0773493182.
- Heseltine, Nigel, ed. (1968) [1944]. Twenty-Five Poems by Dafydd ap Gwilym. Banbury: Piers Press. pp. 41–43. ISBN 9780950355801.
- Jackson, Kenneth Hurlstone, ed. (1971) [1951]. A Celtic Miscellany. Harmondsworth: Penguin. pp. 213–214. ISBN 9780140442472.
- James, Edwin S. (Autumn 1946). "The Poet and the Grey Brother". Wales. 23: 107–109.
- Johnes, Arthur James (1834). Translations into English Verse from the Poems of Davyth ap Gwilym. London: Henry Hooper. pp. 26–27.
- Lake, A. Cynfael. At "148 - Y Bardd a'r Brawd Llwyd". Gwaith Dafydd ap Gwilym. Welsh Department, Swansea University.
- Lewes, Evelyn (1914). Life and Poems of Dafydd ap Gwilym. London: David Nutt. pp. 106–108. Abridged translation.
- Lloyd, D. M. (1963) [1953]. "The Poet and the Friar". In Lloyd, D. M.; Lloyd, E. M. (eds.). A Book of Wales. London: Collins. pp. 318–320.
- Lofmark, Carl (1989). Bards and Heroes. Felinferch: Llanerch. pp. 90–91. ISBN 0947992340.
- Loomis, Richard Morgan, ed. (1982). Dafydd ap Gwilym: The Poems. Binghamton: Center for Medieval & Early Renaissance Studies. pp. 247–249. ISBN 0866980156.
  - Rev. repr. in Loomis, Richard; Johnston, Dafydd (1992). Medieval Welsh Poems. Binghamton: Medieval & Renaissance Texts & Studies. pp. 19–22. ISBN 0866981020.
- Thomas, Gwyn, ed. (2001). Dafydd ap Gwilym: His Poems. Cardiff: University of Wales Press. pp. 267–269. ISBN 0708316646.
- Wood, John (1997). The Gates of the Elect Kingdom. Iowa City: University of Iowa Press. pp. 43–44. ISBN 0877455813. Archived from the original on 29 June 2010.
