= Peniarth 49 =

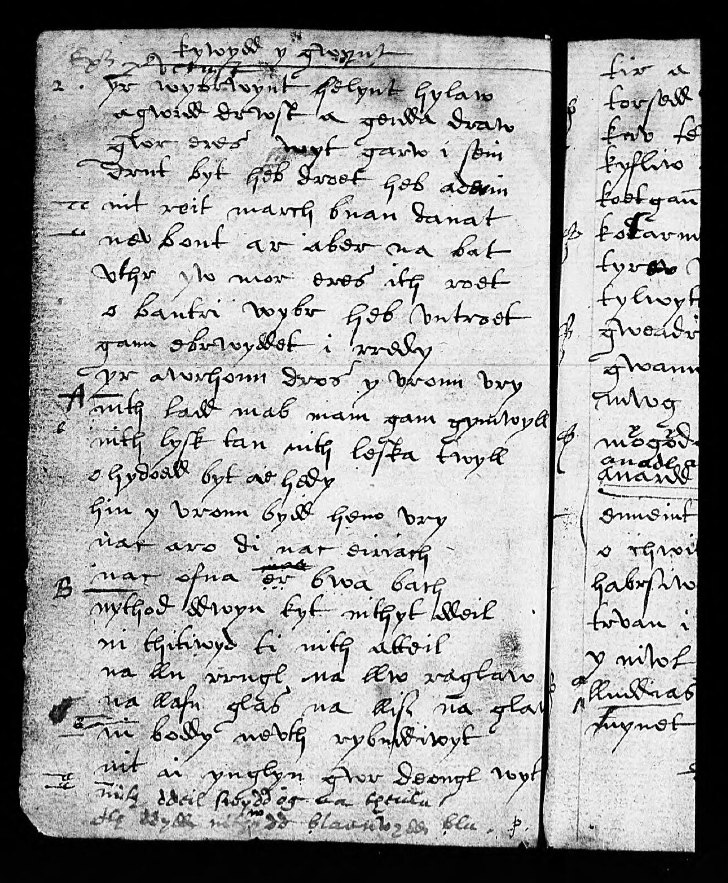
Folio 3^{v} of MS Peniarth 49

Peniarth MS 49, formerly known as Hengwrt MS 302, is a manuscript of Welsh-language poems mostly by the 14th-century bard Dafydd ap Gwilym, but in a few cases by other medieval poets. It was compiled over a period of many years in the late 16th century and early 17th century by the humanist scholar John Davies of Mallwyd. Now held by the National Library of Wales, it is considered the most important large manuscript collection of Dafydd ap Gwilym's poems, valuable for its comprehensiveness, the accuracy of its readings, and the evidence it gives of other, earlier manuscripts.

== Physical description ==
Peniarth 49 is a paper manuscript of 182 folios measuring 145 millimetres (5.7 in) by 93 millimetres (3.7 in). It has been rebound by the National Library of Wales.

== Contents ==
The manuscript collects 138 poems, 124 of which have been accepted into the 147-poem canon of Dafydd ap Gwilym's poems by his latest editors. It therefore includes most of Dafydd's known works, including such well-known poems as "The Dream", "The Girls of Llanbadarn", "His Shadow", "The Magpie's Advice", "The Mirror", "The Poet and the Grey Friar", "The Ruin", "The Seagull", "Summer", "The Wind", and "The Woodland Mass".

== History ==
Though the manuscript is written in three different hands, it is believed by the palaeographer Daniel Huws that all three belong to the same man, the humanist antiquary John Davies, rector of Mallwyd, and that their dissimilar appearance is due to the fact that he wrote the manuscript at three different periods of his life. Poems 1 to 43 were copied during the period 1595–1601, while he was still a young man working for William Morgan, Bishop of Llandaff. Poems 44 to 78 were written at some point between the years 1600 and 1617. Poems 79 to 138, written in the third hand, were the last to be entered into the manuscript.

After Davies's death the manuscript came into the possession of Robert Vaughan of Hengwrt. Vaughan's descendant, Sir Robert Williames Vaughan, left his collection of manuscripts to his friend W. W. E. Wynne of Peniarth, and from Wynne's son they passed to Sir John Williams, who gave them, including Peniarth 49, to the newly-established National Library of Wales.

== Sources ==
In his 1952 edition of Dafydd ap Gwilym's poems Thomas Parry identified four sections of this manuscript which he labelled A, B, C, and D. Section A (poems 1 to 43) was, as John Davies himself wrote, taken from "the book of Mr Wiliam Mathew of Llandaf", a manuscript probably written between the last quarter of the 15th century and the middle of the 16th, but now lost. Davies is our only witness to its existence. Section B (poems 44 to 70) was copied from a collection of Dafydd's poems which formed part of the White Book of Hergest, a 15th-century manuscript destroyed by fire in 1810. Section C (poems 71 to 78) was taken, Davies wrote, from "hên Lyfr arall" (another old book), which is now unidentifiable though it may have originated in north-west Wales. The final section, section D (poems 79–138), is introduced with the statement by Davies that "Those which follow are copied from an old vellum manuscript [vetustus codex] written about 1526." This vetustus codex, yet another lost manuscript, was perhaps an édition de luxe of Dafydd's poems commissioned by a rich Welsh nobleman. Peniarth 49 also contains notes on variant readings taken by Davies from the Book of William Mathew, the vetustus codex, and a manuscript which Dafydd Johnston has identified as CM 5, now in the Cwrtmawr collection of the National Library of Wales.

== Edition ==
- Parry, Thomas, ed. (1929). Peniarth 49. Adysgrifau o'r Llawysgrifau Cymraeg, 6 (in Welsh). Caerdydd: Gwasg Prifysgol Cymru.
