= Grace Gwyneddon Davies =

Singer and folk-song collector

- Born: Grace Elizabeth Roberts; 26 November 1878; Anfield, Liverpool, England
- Died: 17 October 1944 (aged 65)
- Education: Royal Academy of Music
- Occupations: Singer, collector
- Known for: Folk-song collector
- Spouse: Robert Gwyneddon Davies

Grace Gwyneddon Davies (born Grace Elizabeth Roberts; 26 November 1878 – 17 October 1944) was a British singer and Welsh folk-song collector.

== Life and work ==
Davies was born in Anfield, Liverpool on 26 November 1878. Her parents Anne and Lewis Roberts lived in Liverpool but both had Welsh heritage. She developed her musical ability at the Royal Academy of Music gaining qualifications on the piano. She was a singing student of the leading singer Charles Santley. After a year in Paris and more training in Italy she became a professional.

She was a soloist at the National Eisteddfod of Wales in Caernarfon in 1906. She also attended a meeting of the Honourable Society of Cymmrodorion in the County Hall, where she sang an arrangement by Arthur Somervell of the Welsh tune, 'Knot y Coed'. At that eisteddfod she met a number of leading North Welsh people, including her future husband, Robert Gwyneddon Davies.

The Cymdeithas Alawon Werin Cymru (Welsh Folk Song Society) had been established in March 1909 and Davies and her husband were elected founder members of its committee. In 1909 they married in London and their wedding was celebrated in the town of Caenarvon as her husband had been the mayor there the year before. In 1911 she and her husband began to contribute to the Society by giving lectures on folk singing in Caernarfon and north Wales. 'Robin' would narrate and Grace would sing.

The two sailed to Ireland to lecture on folk songs in Wales to an audience at Trinity College, Dublin. When they visited the United States of America and Canada years later, that was considered a key step forward in the development of the Society. Welsh folk tunes because no one had ever before ventured so far for the benefit of the nation's folk music. Robert and Grace Gwyneddon Davies's presentations and public lectures were based on their direct experience, from 1913 onwards, in the world of collecting and recording Welsh tunes.

Because of their family ties to Anglesey they turned towards Dwyran to look for musical material. Owen Parry, one of the local tenants, gave her a store of songs. Among them were collected the material of the stable loft and the songs of the farm servants of the island. When her first volume of Folk Songs appeared in 1914 it contained simple arrangements of seven Welsh tunes for voice and piano accompaniment and among them, songs such as 'Cob Malltraeth', 'Y Gelynen', 'Cwyn Mam-y-' were recorded. law' and 'Titrum, tatrum'. By 1924, the second collection of Alawon Gwerin Môn had appeared from the press and this volume was also a record of Owen Parry's singing with the exception of one item, a version of 'Lisa Lân' obtained by his daughter, Margaret (Maggie) Jones, on Talybont farm, Dwyran.

When some of Davies' arrangements appeared on the National Eisteddfod's list of subjects for the first time in 1918, the close link that had existed between her and the Brifwyl was re-established - a direct link that lasted for twenty-five years. She was a judge in the folk singing department between 1921 and 1933 and shared her responsibilities with Mary Davies and Philip Thomas, as well as David de Lloyd and W. S. Gwynn Williams.

She died on 17 October 1944. Her archives are at the National Library of Wales.

== Publications ==
- Grace Gwyneddon Davies, Folk Songs of Anglesey (Caernarfon, 1914)
- Robert Gwyneddon Davies, 'The Collecting of Anglesey Folk Songs', Anglesey Antiquarian and Field Club: Transactions, Vol. 1923 (Llangefni, 1923), 95
- Grace Gwyneddon Davies, A Second Collection of Folk Songs from Anglesey (Wrexham, 1924)
- Second collection of Welsh folk-songs (1934) collected by Lady Herbert Lewis, accompaniments by Morfydd Owen and Grace Gwyneddon Davies
- Wyn Thomas, Graianfryn Mistress and native music in Wales (Aberystwyth, 1999)
