= J. E. Caerwyn Williams =

Welsh scholar (1912–1999)

- Born: John Ellis Caerwyn Williams; 17 January 1912; Gwauncaegurwen, Glamorgan, Wales
- Died: 10 June 1999 (aged 87); Aberystwyth, Wales
- Education: University College of North Wales, Bangor; University College, Dublin; Trinity College, Dublin
- Occupation: Scholar

John Ellis Caerwyn Williams FBA (17 January 1912 – 10 June 1999), was a Welsh scholar. His fields of study included the literatures of the Celtic languages, especially Welsh and Irish literature. He published books in both English and Welsh.

== Biography ==
Caerwyn Williams was born on 17 January 1912 in Gwauncaegurwen, Glamorgan, into a coal-mining family. He studied at the University College of North Wales, Bangor, and graduated in Latin in 1933 and in Welsh in 1934. He then studied further at University College, Dublin, and Trinity College, Dublin. Intending to become a minister in the Presbyterian Church of Wales he studied at the United Theological College, Aberystwyth, and graduated BD in 1944.

In 1945, he was appointed to teach at the Department of Welsh at the University College of North Wales, Bangor and became professor of Welsh in 1953. He remained in that post until his appointment as professor of Irish at the University College of Wales, Aberystwyth, in 1965, where he remained until his retirement in 1979.

In 1971, Caerwyn Williams delivered the British Academy's Sir John Rhŷs Memorial Lecture. He was elected a Fellow of the British Academy in 1978.

He died in Aberystwyth on 10 June 1999, at the age of 87.

== Selected publications ==
- Traddodiad llenyddol Iwerddon (=The literary tradition of Ireland) (1958), later translated into English as The Irish Literary Tradition (1992)
- The Poems of Taliesin (Mediaeval & Modern Welsh) (editor, with Ifor Williams, 1968)
- Literature in Celtic Countries (1971)
- Y storïwr Gwyddelig a'i chwedlau (=The Irish story-teller and his tales) (1972)
- Poets of the Welsh Princes (Writers of Wales S.) (1978)
- Ysgrifau Beirniadol (=Critical writings) (1965- ). Founding editor of the series of volumes of critical essays mainly on Welsh-language literature.

== See also ==
- Bewnans Ke
