= Tony Conran =

Tony Conran (7 April 1931 – 14 January 2013) was an Anglo-Welsh poet and translator of Welsh poetry. His own poetry was mostly written in English and Modernist in style but was very much influenced by Welsh poetic tradition, Welsh culture and history. To some extent there are parallels in Conran's writing with that of R. S. Thomas, but Conran can also be seen in the line of Pound, Bunting and MacDiarmid.

He was born in Kharagpur, Bengal, India, but, because he suffered from cerebral palsy, he was brought to the UK in 1933 and largely brought up by his grandparents in Colwyn Bay, being separated from his parents by the Second War. He was educated at Colwyn Bay High School, took his degree at Bangor and other than a brief spell working at a factory in Essex, Conran spent most of his working life in Bangor, North Wales.

Until 1983, he taught at the Bangor University, where he was tutor in the English Department. Academically, he took a particular interest in Welsh poetry, both in Welsh and English; also in traditional folksong and ballads. After retiring from academic life, Conran continued to develop his own poetic art, often combining dramatic presentation of his work in conjunction with visual and performance artists.

Conran's first collection of original poetry was Formal Poems (1958). His numerous other collections include Stelae and Other Poems (1965), Spirit Level (1974), and Life Fund (1979). He has also written many critiques of Welsh literature, including a collection of essays entitled The Cost of Strangeness (Gomer Press, 1982). In 1967, he produced a celebrated collection of Welsh language poetry in translation, Welsh Verse (Penguin). This collection was re-published in 1982 by Poetry Wales Press with an extensive and influential introductory essay by Conran. He has also edited a collection of poetry by South Wales poet Idris Davies. He was married to Lesley Conran. His daughters are the visual artist Maia Conran and the novelist Alys Conran.

== Works ==
- Blodeuwedd (1988)
- Castles (1993)
- All Hallows (1995)
- A Gwynedd Symphony (1996)
- What Brings You Here So Late? (2008)
