= David Bell (artist) =

Ernest David Bell (4 June 1915 – 21 April 1959) was an English-born writer and curator, who was a controversial figure in Welsh arts by challenging the country's artistic heritage, but was also a supporter of young Welsh talent in the field of contemporary arts in the 20th century.

== Biography ==
Bell was born in 1915 in London, to Idris Bell, a translator of Welsh poetry to English, and Mabel Winifred. Privately educated in England, Bell gained his first appreciation of the arts at Merchant Taylors' School. He graduated from the Royal College of Art and joined the Egypt Exploration Society, working in Sesebi in the Sudan and Amarah in Iraq. With the outbreak of World War II, Bell found work with the cartographical department of the Admiralty, first in England, and then in Wales, being posted to the National Library of Wales at Aberystwyth.

After the war, Bell was appointed assistant director of the Welsh Arts Council and in 1951 he became the curator of the Glynn Vivian Art Gallery in Swansea. In 1952, Bell and his father translated the works of Dafydd ap Gwilym, and he continued translating Welsh works, like his father, throughout his later life. In 1957, Bell published The Artist in Wales, in which he implied that Wales, as a country, did not possess a worthwhile visual cultural history. This caused a backlash from others in the field of arts in Wales and the national media.

Although challenging the Welsh field of arts, Bell was a keen supporter of young talent in the country, and gave significant support to living artists, buying works from contemporary artists, such as Ceri Richards, for the Glynn Vivian Museum.

Bell's paintings are represented in the permanent collections of the Glyn Vivian Gallery and the National Museum of Wales.

== Bibliography ==
- Davies, John; Jenkins, Nigel (2008). The Welsh Academy Encyclopaedia of Wales. Cardiff: University of Wales Press. ISBN 978-0-7083-1953-6.
