= John Wood (poet) =

American poet (1947–2022)

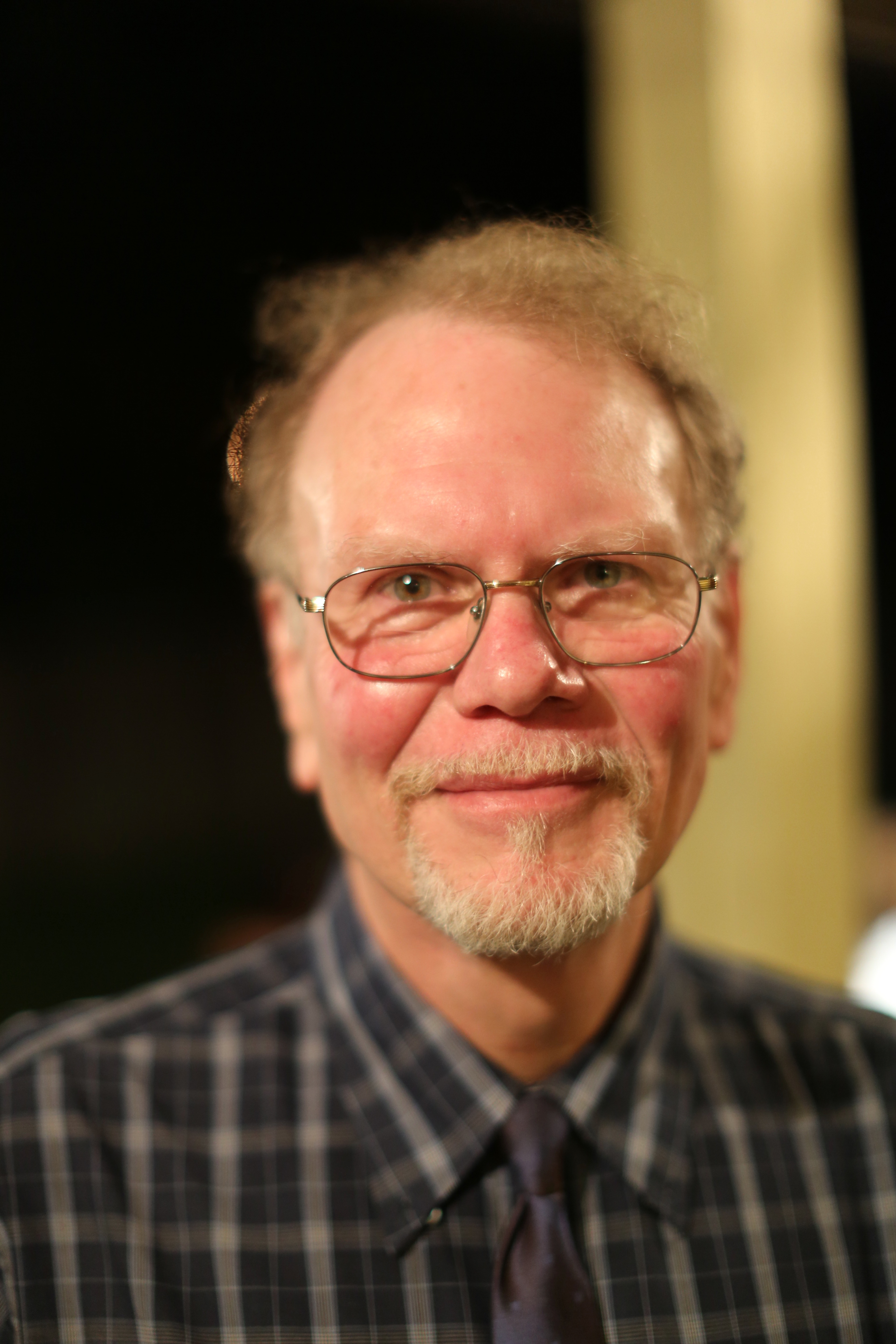
- Born: January 2, 1947 (age 79); Arkansas, United States
- Died: May 4, 2022; Saxtons River, Vermont
- Occupations: Poet, Critic, Historian of Photography
- Spouse: Carol Wood
- Children: Dafydd Wood
- Writing career
- Genre: Poetry
- Notable awards: Iowa Poetry Prize

John Wood (January 2, 1947-May 4, 2022) was an American poet, historian of photography, scholar and critic. Wood is Professor Emeritus of English literature and photographic history at McNeese State University, where he founded and directed its MFA in creative writing for more than twenty-five years.

== Early life and education ==
Wood was born and raised in Pine Bluff, Arkansas, where his family lived near an evangelical church. He received his bachelor's degree in philosophy from Arkansas State University, and his Master of Fine Arts in creative writing and Ph.D. in English Literature from the University of Arkansas, where he studied under T. C. Duncan Eaves, who inspired Wood to focus his dissertation studies on 18th century literature.

== Career ==
Poetry While still a graduate student, Wood's poetry was noticed by Allen Ginsberg, who praised the work. In 1971, Wood won the John Gould Fletcher Prize for Poetry and soon his poems began appearing in Poetry. He would become a regular contributor to the Southern Review. Wood twice won the Iowa Poetry Prize, first for his 1993 collection In Primary Light and again in 1996 for The Gates of the Elect Kingdom. His 2008 poetry collection Endurance and Suffering: Narratives of Disease in the 19th Century, written to accompany photographs by O.G. Mason taken for the purposes of George Henry Fox's medical research, won the Gold Deutscher Fotobuchpreis. Wood's poetry often evokes voices of oracular zeal and subject matter focusing on family, suffering and soulful conviction. "As strange as it might sound," Wood is quoted as saying, "I've always thought were I given but a single adjective to describe my poetry, it would be 'religious.' The spiritual, whatever that is, haunts the majority of my work. Intellectually I don't consider myself religious, but emotionally I certainly do." With formalist tendencies, John Wood brings a neoclassical aesthetic to post-modernism with poems on science, religion, pop culture and Southern Gothic. He is known for his energetic style of performance giving poetry readings. He also translated Baudelaire's Flowers of Evil and wrote poems in accompaniment to photographic collaborations with Charles Grogg and Steven Albahari.

Photographic History and Criticism Wood authored of over a dozen volumes of photographic history and criticism, including America and the Daguerreotype, which was selected as a 1992 "Outstanding Academic Book of the Year" by the American Library Association, and Secrets of the Dark Chamber, which the New York Times named a Best Book of the Year in 1995. In 1988, Wood co-founded the Dageurreian Society and was its first president. He contributed many articles to the Dageurreian Annual and co-curated the Smithsonian Institution's landmark 1995 exhibition Secrets of the Dark Chamber. He also contributed to the National Museum of American Art's exhibition Silver and Gold: Photographs of the Gold Rush. His early research and criticism focused on the Daguerreotype and cyanotype but came to include other photographic processes, including the Autochrome Lumière, and increasingly focused on contemporary photographers like Sally Mann and Joel-Peter Witkin. He wrote the forwards of more than thirty photography monographs, including work by the artists Jan Saudek, Keith Carter and Connie Imboden and edited more than forty-five monographs of leading photographers such as Masao Yamamoto, Jerry Uelsmann and Michael Kenna. In addition, Wood contributed essays to and wrote the catalog copy for dozens of books of photography, featuring work by artists Jock Sturges, Imogen Cunningham and John Dugdale.

Journal of Contemporary Photography In 1998, Wood co-founded with Steven Albahari 21st editions, "the most luxurious literary/photography journal in the world", and became editor of its main title, The Journal of Contemporary Photography. Previous editions have paired the writings of Edward Albee, Annie Dillard, Robert Olen Butler, Adam Johnson and Richard Wilbur with the photographs of such artists as Imogen Cunningham, Duane Michals, Joel-Peter Witkin, Keith Carter and Sally Mann.

McNeese State University John Wood was hired as a professor at McNeese State University in 1976 and soon after founded its Master of Fine Arts in creative writing program, marking it as one of the older MFA programs in America. In 2003 he was named a Pinnacle Professor in the Liberal Arts. He retired in 2007 and was named Professor Emeritus in 2009.

== Personal life ==
John Wood and his wife Carol Wood lived in Saxtons River, Vermont.

== Bibliography ==
Poetry Collections

- The Imponderable Heart of Meaning, 2014, 21st Editions
- Cracked, 2013, 21st Editions
- The Fictions of History, 2011, 21st Editions
- Endurance and Suffering, 2008 Edition Galerie Vevais
- Selected Poems 1968–1998, 1999, University of Arkansas Press
- The Gates of the Elect Kingdom, 1997, University of Iowa Press
- In Primary Light, 1994, University of Iowa Press

History of Photography and Criticism

- The Photographic Arts, 1997, University of Iowa Press
- The Scenic Daguerreotype: Romanticism and Early Photography, 1995, University of Iowa Press
- Secrets of the Dark Chamber, with Merry Foresta, 1995, Smithsonian Press
- The Art of the Autochrome: The Birth of Color Photography, 1993, University of Iowa Press
- America and the Daguerreotype, 1991, University of Iowa Press
- The Daguerreotype: A Sesquicentennial Celebration, 1989, University of Iowa Press
