= Thomas Wiliems =

Thomas Wiliems (born in Ardda'r Mynaich in Arllechwedd, Wales possibly on 20 April 1545 or 1546; died in or before 13 August 1623) was a Welsh-language antiquarian.

== Biography ==
Wiliems's mother was Catherine, the illegitimate daughter of Meredydd ab Ifan of the Wynn family, and Wiliam ap Tomos ap Gronwy. Wiliems was brought up in the parish of Trefriw, Arllechwedd Isaf, Caernarfonshire, and is likely that Wiliems was educated in the Wynn family's own school (like William Morgan, who translated the Welsh Bible). The Renaissance brought unprecedented interest in education to Wiliems's generation, and had a clear effect on his life. He attended Brasenose College, Oxford for a time, but clear records of his studies there are lacking because of confusion with other similarly named students, and it seems he did not take a degree. Rather he was ordained as an Anglican priest, serving as a curate for Trefriw from c. 1573. Accordingly, he was generally known to his contemporaries as Syr ('Sir') Thomas Wiliems, because this was the usual title for priests in Welsh at the time. However, Wiliems became a recusant, converting to Roman Catholicism, after which he worked as a physician (drawing on his extensive book-learning: qualifications as such were not required at the time). As a Catholic, Wiliems was denied access to printing, which perhaps helps to explain the focus of his scholarly activities on manuscript production.

He died before 13 August 1623, at which time his uncle Sir John Wynn of the neighbouring Gwydir Castle, inscribed his name on the manuscript of Wiliem's dictionary as its owner. Notes in Wiliems's manuscripts suggest he turned to Catholicism; he was certainly charged on that score at Bangor in 1607.

== Scholarship ==
=== Dictionary ===
Wiliems is best known for producing a Latin-Welsh dictionary in manuscript form (National Library of Wales, Peniarth 228), apparently between 4 May 1604 and 2 October 1607. He worked towards this by keeping a kind of commonplace book (Peniarth MS 188), which he systematised by essentially taking the Dictionarium Linguae Latinae et Anglicanae (1587) by Thomas Thomas, the first printer of Cambridge University, and adding Welsh to it. This was completed in 1607 and entitled Thesaurus Linguæ Latinæ et Cambrobritannicæ or Trysawr yr iaith Laidin ar Gymraec, ne'r Geiriadur coheddocaf a'r wiriathaf o wir aleitiaith Vrytanæc, sef heniaith a chyphredin iaith yn y Brydain, ar Latin yn cyfateb pob gair. Wedy dechreu i scriuenu 4. Maij 1604. According to the prologue, Wiliems spent 30 years gathering material, and did so in order to promote the Welsh language, which was being spoken less and less by his contemporaries.

The dictionary was not published during Wiliems's lifetime, despite the efforts of Wiliems's friend John Edwards (of Plas Newydd, Chirk), who got part way through making a neater manuscript copy (Brogyntyn MSS 9 and 10). Wiliems left the manuscript of the dictionary to Sir John Wynn, who passed it to John Davies of Mallwyd, asking that Davies publish it, giving recognition to the author and a dedication to Sir John himself. John was already undertaking a Welsh-Latin dictionary and in the event published an abbreviation of Wiliems's Latin-Welsh dictionary in the second part of his own, which emerged as Antiquae Linguae Britannicae ... Dictionarum Duplex in 1632.

=== Other works ===
According to Bishop Humphrey Humphreys, Wiliems compiled ‘a pretty large Herbal in Latin, Welsh and English’. It is now lost, unless parts survive, copied by Thomas Evans, in Cardiff MS 2.973; but Wiliems certain consulted Llanstephan MS 10 and BL, Add. MS 14913 (containing Meddygon Myddfai). He seems to have translated the Trattato del sacramento della penitenza by Vincenzo Bruno SJ into Welsh, and compiled a collection of Welsh proverbs (surviving, in another's hand, in Mostyn MS 204).

=== Manuscript copying ===
Wiliams's family connections meant that he knew the owners of some of Wales's most important medieval manuscripts, and he began transcribing manuscripts already by the age of twenty-one. His copying included:

- Many manuscripts of genealogical texts (e.g. ‘Prif Achæ Holh Gymrû Benbaladr’, in NL Wales, MSS 16962 and 16963)
- The historical texts Brut y Brenhinedd and Historia Dared (NL Wales, MS 5281), and the White Book of Rhydderch (Wiliems's manuscript of which included parts of the medieval manuscript now lost, though Wiliems's own copy now only survives through later copies of it).
- A Latin text of the Welsh Laws (Peniarth MS 225)
- Texts on grammar and lexicography, including part of the second part of Gruffydd Robert's grammar (Peniarth MS 62); Pum Llyfr Cerddwriaeth (Peniarth MS 62); two bardic grammars (Mostyn MS 110), and his copious summary of, although not in his hand), and selections of late medieval Welsh poetry (Peniarth MS 77, Havod MS 26).

== Appearances in popular culture ==
It is rumoured that Wiliems was involved in the Gunpowder Plot and, in warning his relative John Wynn not to go to the State Opening of Parliament in 1605, was responsible to either a smaller or greater extent for the suspicions which ultimately caught Guy Fawkes. This story is the basis for a short historical novel written for children by Gweneth Lilly, entitled Treason at Trefriw (Gomer Press, 1993).

== Bibliography ==
- Rhyddiaith Gymraeg: Y gyfrol gyntaf, Detholion o Lawysgrifau 1488–1609, ed. T. H. Parry Williams (Caerdydd: Gwasg Prifysgol Cymru, 1954).
- Williams, J. E. Caerwyn. 'Thomas Wiliems, Y Geiriadurwr,' Studia Celtica 16/17 (1981/2): 280-316.
