= Rolfe Humphries =

American poet

George Rolfe Humphries (November 20, 1894 – April 22, 1969) was a poet, translator, and teacher.

== Life ==
An alumnus of Towanda High School, Humphries graduated cum laude from Amherst College in 1915. He was a first lieutenant machine gunner in World War I, from 1917 to 1918. In 1925, he married Helen Ward Spencer.

He taught Latin in secondary schools in San Francisco, New York City, and Long Island through 1957. He translated major works of Ovid and Juvenal and was well known as a classicist. From 1957 to 1965, he taught at Amherst College and at many poetry and creative writing workshops, including the University of New Hampshire Writers' Conference and the University of Colorado Writers' Conference. A mentor to many poets, including Theodore Roethke. he counted among his literary friendships those with Louise Bogan, Edmund Wilson, and Elizabeth Bishop. His work appeared in Harper's and The New Yorker.

Humphries may be best remembered for a notorious literary prank. Asked to contribute a piece to Poetry in 1939, he penned 39 lines containing an acrostic. The first letters of each line spelled out the message: "Nicholas Murray Butler is a horses ass." The editor printed an apology and Humphries was banned from the publication. The ban was lifted in 1941.

His papers are held at Amherst College.

== Spain ==
Like many American intellectuals, Humphries supported the Republican side in the Spanish Civil War. He was the main organizer of a fund-raising volume, ...And Spain Sings. Fifty Loyalist Ballads (1937). He translated two volumes of poetry of Federico García Lorca, a Spanish homosexual poet assassinated at the beginning of that war and an icon of what Spain lost. Because of controversy surrounding the text of the first of those books, Humphries' correspondence with William Warder Norton, Louise Bogan, and others was published by Daniel Eisenberg (es) (in Spanish translation). Eisenberg praises Humphries as a textual scholar.

== Awards ==
- 1938 Guggenheim Fellow in creative writing
- 1955 Academy of American Poets' Fellowship

== Works ==
=== Poetry ===
- "Coming Home". Casa Poema.
- Don Johnson (1991). "Night Game". Hummers, knucklers, and slow curves: contemporary baseball poems. University of Illinois Press. p. 61. ISBN 978-0-252-06183-7. "Rolfe Humphries."
- Europa and Other Poems and Sonnets. Crosby Gaige. 1929.
- Out of the Jewel. C. Scribner's sons. 1942.
- The Summer Landscape. Scribner's Sons. 1945.
- Forbid Thy Ravens. C. Scribner's Sons. 1947.
- The Wind of Time. C. Scribner's Sons. 1949.
- Poems Collected and New. Scribner. 1954.
- Green armor on green ground: poems in the twenty-four official Welsh meters. Scribner. 1956.
- Collected poems. Indiana University Press. 1965.
- Coat on a stick: late poems. Indiana University Press. 1969. ISBN 9780253112309.

=== Translations ===
- Federico García Lorca's The Poet in New York and other poems. W. W. Norton & Company, Inc. Publishers. 1940.
- Virgil's Aeneid. Scribner. 1951. Virgil's Aeneid via HathiTrust
- The gypsy ballads of Federico García Lorca: with 3 historical ballads. Indiana University Press. 1953.
- Ovid's Metamorphoses. Indiana University Press. 1955. ISBN 978-0-253-20001-3.
- Ovid: The Art of Love. Indiana University Press. 1957.
- Juvenal's Satires. Indiana University Press. 1959. ISBN 978-0-253-20020-4.
- Selected Epigrams of Martial. Indiana University Press. 1963.
- Lucretius: The Way Things Are. Indiana University Press. 1968.
- Nine Thorny Thickets: Selected Poems by Dafydd ap Gwilym. Kent State University Press. 1969. ISBN 978-0873380393.

=== Non-fiction ===
- Richard Gillman, Michael Paul Novak, ed. (1992). Poets, Poetics, and Politics: America's Literary Community Viewed from the Letters of Rolfe Humphries, 1910–1969. University Press of Kansas. ISBN 978-0-7006-0589-7.
- "Inside Story". The New Republic. Vol. 105, no. 1. July 14, 1941. p. 62.
- Grant, Michael (March 1942). "Salvation from Sand in Salt". Poetry. lix: 228–229. ISBN 978-0-415-15948-7.

=== Musical ===
- Adelante, 1939

=== Edition ===
- ...And Spain Sings. Fifty Loyalist Ballads. New York, Vanguard Press, 1937. (With M. J. Benardete.) From WorldCat: ""Adaptations by Edna St. Vincent Millay, George Dillon, Genevieve Taggard, Muriel Rukeyser, William Carlos Williams, Jean Starr Untermeyer, Shaemas O'Sheel, Ruth Lechlitner, and other poets."—Dust jacket cover."

== Reviews ==
W. H. Auden called Humphries' translation of Virgil's Aeneid "a service for which no public reward could be too great."
