= Idris Bell =

Museum curator, a British papyrologist and a scholar of Welsh literature

Sir Idris Bell CB OBE
- Born: Harold Idris Bell; October 2, 1879
- Died: January 22, 1967 (aged 87)

Academic work
- Discipline: Literature, Papyrology
- Sub-discipline: Welsh-language literature
- Main interests: Art curation

Sir Harold Idris Bell CB OBE (2 October 1879 – 22 January 1967) was a British museum curator, papyrologist (specialising in Roman Egypt) and scholar of Welsh literature.

Bell was born at Epworth, Lincolnshire to an English father and a Welsh mother. His maternal grandfather, John Hughes of Rhuddlan, was a Welsh speaker. He was educated at Nottingham High School and Oriel College, Oxford. In 1903, he joined the British Museum as an assistant in the Department of Manuscripts and remained there his entire working life, becoming Deputy Keeper of the Department in 1927 and Keeper in 1929. He retired in 1944, and in 1946 he went to live at Aberystwyth, naming his house Bro Gynin, a sign of his respect for the poet Dafydd ap Gwilym.

Bell was appointed Officer of the Order of the British Empire (OBE) in the 1920 civilian war honours for his wartime services as editor of the Food Supplement of the Daily Review of the Foreign Press. He was appointed Companion of the Order of the Bath (CB) in 1936 and was knighted in 1946. He was president of the International Association of Papyrologists from 1947 to 1955. He was elected corresponding member of several Continental and American learned societies, and was awarded honorary degrees by the Universities of Wales, Liverpool, Michigan and Brussels. In 1932 the British Academy elected him a Fellow, and he was president from 1946 to 1950. As president in these post-war years, he worked hard to re-establish scholarly links and co-operation across Europe, especially in his own field of papyrology.

He was also a poet and translator. His son, David Bell, with whom he translated the works of Dafydd ap Gwilym in 1942, was the curator of the Glynn Vivian Art Gallery in Swansea.
