= Rachel Bromwich =

British scholar (1915–2010)

- Born: Rachel Sheldon Amos; 30 July 1915; Hove, Sussex, England, UK
- Died: 15 December 2010 (aged 95); Aberystwyth, Wales, UK
- Parent: Maurice Amos
- Relatives: Thomas John I'Anson Bromwich (father-in-law)

Academic work
- Notable works: Trioedd Ynys Prydein

Rachel Sheldon Bromwich (née Amos; 30 July 1915 – 15 December 2010) was a British scholar. Her focus was on medieval Welsh literature, and she taught Celtic Languages and Literature in the Department of Anglo-Saxon, Norse and Celtic at the University of Cambridge, from 1945 to 1976. Among her most important contributions to the study of Welsh literature is Trioedd Ynys Prydein, her edition of the Welsh Triads.

== Early life and education ==
Rachel Sheldon Amos was born in Hove, Sussex (some obituaries said Brighton), in 1915, and spent her early childhood in Egypt. Her father, Maurice Amos, was an English legal expert who served as international law adviser to the Egyptian government; her mother, Lucy Scott-Moncrieff Amos, was Scottish. The Amos family were Quakers. The family moved frequently before settling in Cumbria in 1925.

In 1934 Rachel Amos attended Newnham College, Cambridge, where she studied the Anglo-Saxon language before shifting departments to focus on Middle Welsh. In 1938 she moved to the University College of Wales, Bangor and studied under Ifor Williams. Amos took a great interest in Medieval Welsh literature, and particularly the Arthurian legend; it was Williams' suggestion that she edit the Welsh Triads. She also studied Old Irish at Queen's University, Belfast, during World War II.

== Career ==
Bromwich taught Old Welsh and Old Irish at Cambridge, beginning in 1945. She was named university reader in Celtic languages and literatures in 1973. She retired from teaching in 1976 and was succeeded by Patrick Sims-Williams. In 1985, she was awarded the degree of D.Litt. by the University of Wales for her services to Welsh scholarship.

In 1961 Bromwich published Trioedd Ynys Prydein, her influential edition of the Welsh Triads. A third, revised edition was published in 2006. This is considered "a central work of the scholarship on medieval Welsh literature", according to her Cambridge obituary. Her other major contribution to Welsh scholarship was her series of books and articles on Dafydd ap Gwilym, the outstanding Welsh poet of the period, mostly summarised in Aspects of the Poetry of Dafydd ap Gwilym (Cardiff, 1985). With D. Simon Evans she produced editions of the major medieval Welsh tale Culhwch and Olwen in both Welsh (1988) and English (1992).

She served in leadership positions with the Honourable Society of Cymmrodorion, the International Arthurian Society, and the Irish Texts Society.

== Selected publications ==
- The Continuity of the Gaelic Tradition in Eighteenth-century Ireland (1948)
- Some Remarks on the Celtic Sources of "Tristan" (1955)
- Matthew Arnold and Celtic literature: a retrospect, 1865-1965 (1965)
- 'Trioedd Ynys Prydain' in Welsh Literature and Scholarship (1969)
- Tradition and Innovation in the Poetry of Dafydd Ap Gwilym (1972)
- Medieval Celtic Literature: A Select Bibliography (1974)
- Dafydd ap Gwilym (1974)
- Aspects of the Poetry of Dafydd Ap Gwilym: Collected Papers (1986)
- Culhwch ac Olwen: testun Syr Idris Foster wedi ei olygu a'i orffen (1988)

== Personal life ==
In 1939 Rachel Amos married archaeologist and historian John Bromwich (1915–1990), the son of mathematician Thomas John I'Anson Bromwich; they had one son, Brian. Rachel Bromwich died in 2010, aged 95 years, in Aberystwyth.
