= Gwyn Thomas (poet) =

Welsh poet and academic (1936–2016)

National Poet of Wales
- In office 2006–2008
- Preceded by: Gwyneth Lewis
- Succeeded by: Gillian Clarke

Personal details
- Born: 2 September 1936
- Died: 13 April 2016 (aged 79)
- Occupation: Writer

Gwyn Thomas, FLSW (2 September 1936 – 13 April 2016) was a Welsh poet and academic. He was the second National Poet of Wales, holding the role between 2006 and 2008.

== Early life and education ==
Born in Tanygrisiau, Gwynedd, and brought up there and in Blaenau Ffestiniog, Thomas was educated at Ysgol Sir Ffestiniog, University of Wales, Bangor and Jesus College, Oxford; Prof Thomas was Emeritus Professor of Welsh at the University of Wales, Bangor.

== Career ==
Thomas published 16 volumes of poetry, several volumes of work as a literary and cultural critic and also translated the Mabinogion into English. His first work as a poet Chwerwder yn y Ffynhonnau ("Bitterness in the Fountains") was published in 1962, while his last, Hen Englynion - Diweddariadau, was published in 2015 by Barddas. As a literary and cultural critic, he published several volumes of essays, critiques, adaptations and translations, including the classic Y Traddodiad Barddol – a study of the classic poetic tradition of Wales. Thomas was also involved with the film industry in Wales, and helped pioneer techniques to combine poetry and film.

In 2006, Thomas published his autobiography, entitled Bywyd Bach (Small Life), having been asked to contribute to the series Cyfres y Cewri (Series of the Giants).

Also in 2006, Thomas was appointed National Poet of Wales by Academi, replacing Wales first national poet Gwyneth Lewis. Thomas said he would use the 12-month appointment to draw attention to the work of Welsh poets.

Thomas provided the words for many "inspirational" books and added his touch to a photographic book entitled Blaenau Ffestiniog.

As Welsh National Poet, Thomas was commissioned to write five stanzas celebrating the opening in June 2009 of Hafod Eryri, the new summit building at the top of Snowdon. Inscribed on the buildings and windows, in both English and Welsh, they read:

The summit of Snowdon, here you are nearer to heaven

The rocks record the aeons of creation

It's our duty to guard this glory

Here you will see tempests and tranquillity

All around us are the grandeur and the anguish of an old, old nation

Thomas and Margaret Jones won three annual Tir na n-Og Awards from the Welsh Books Council for the previous year's best Welsh-language children's nonfiction book. Their award-winning collaborations were Culhwch ac Olwen in 1989, Chwedl Taliesin in 1993, and Stori Dafydd ap Gwilym in 2004. The first two were published by Gwasg Prifysgol Cymru (University of Wales Press), the latter by Y Lolfa.

In 2011, Thomas was elected as a Fellow of the Learned Society of Wales.

== Works ==
=== Poetry ===
- Chwerwder yn y Ffynhonnau ('Bitterness in the Wells') (1962)
- Y Weledigaeth Haearn ('The Iron Vision') (1965)
- Ysgyrion Gwaed ('Blood Splinters') (1967)
- Enw'r Gair ('The Name of the Word') (1972)
- Y Pethau Diwethaf a Phethau Eraill ('The Last Things and Other Things') (1975)
- Cadwynau yn y Meddwl ('Chains in the Mind')
- Croesi Traeth ('Crossing a Beach') (1978)
- Symud y Lliwiau ('Moving the Colours') (1981)
- Living a Life: Selected Poems 1962-1982; selected and introduced by Joseph P. Clancy with translations by Joseph P. Clancy and Gwyn Thomas) (1982)
- Wmgawa ('Umgawah' an attempt to convey Tarzan's sound) (1984)
- Am Ryw Hyd ('For an Allotted Time') (1986)
- Gwelaf Afon ('I see a River') (1990)
- Darllen y Meini ('Reading the Stones') (1998)
- Gweddnewidio: Detholiad o Gerddi 1962-1986 ('Changing Appearance: Selected Poems 1962-1986') (2000)
- Apocalups Yfory ("Apocalypse Tomorrow") (2005)
- Teyrnas y Tywyllwch ('The Kingdom of Darkness') (2007)
- Murmuron Tragwyddoldeb a Chwningod Tjioclet ('Murmurings of Eternity and Chocolate Bunnies') (2010)
- Profiadau Intergalactig ('Intergalactic Experiences')
