= Toddaid =

Verse form commonly used in Welsh-language poetry

A toddaid (Welsh pronunciation: ['toːðai̯d]) is a type of verse used in Welsh poetry of all periods, written in two lines. The regular toddaid has one line of 10 syllables, and another of 9 syllables. There also exists the toddaid hir ("long toddaid") of 10 syllables + 10, and the toddaid byr ("short toddaid") of 10 syllables + 6. The main use of a toddaid is as part of one or other of the various poetic metres, mixed with lines of other lengths. The toddaid is also a metre in its own right, consisting of two 19-syllable toddaid verses joined together, considered to be one of the 24 traditional Welsh poetic metres.

The main characteristic of a 19-syllable or 20-syllable toddaid is that it has "cross-rhyming": that is, the 7th, 8th or 9th syllable of line 1 rhymes with the last syllable of line 2, while the last syllable of line 1 rhymes with the 5th syllable of line 2, as in the following example by Wiliam Llŷn (16th century):

A'i enaid a gaid / heb na gawr––na gwae
Yn y lle da mae / yn llaw Duw mawr
("And his soul was found without crying or woe,
It is in the good place, in the hand of the great God.")

The rhyme at the end of line 1 changes from verse to verse, but the rhyme at the end of line 2 continues throughout the poem.

The part of the line following the first rhyme in line 1 is called the gair cyrch (literally, "attack word" or "aiming word"). Usually in writing there is a dash before the gair cyrch, but this is simply a metrical mark and does not necessarily represent a pause or break in sense. In the centre of each line is a caesura, indicated here by a forward slash (/).

When a toddaid has only six syllables in the second line, the gair cyrch is usually linked to the second line by consonance rather than rhyme (although rhyme is sometimes found); the main rhyme remains unchanged. The following example is thought to be by Dafydd ap Gwilym (14th century):

Heddiw y gwelais / yn gwyliaw––gwydrin
(A gwadraith / heb dygiaw)
("Today, looking in a glass, I saw,
and denying it is useless,")

In addition to the obligatory cross-rhymes or consonance described above, a toddaid usually contains additional instances of rhyme and consonance, known as cynghanedd, which varies from verse to verse according to the wish of the poet.

The name toddaid appears to be connected to the adjective tawdd ("melted") and the verb toddi ("to melt, blend"), perhaps because the two lines of the couplet blend with each other.

== Terminology ==
The term toddaid (without an adjective) usually refers to the 19-syllable toddaid, while the term toddaid hir ("long toddaid") is reserved for the rarer 20-syllable length. However, the term toddaid hir is often used for both the 19-syllable and the 20-syllable toddaid, when it is contrasted with the 16-syllable toddaid byr.

The shorter toddaid, with six syllables in the second line, is known as toddaid byr ("short toddaid") or toddaid cwta ("curtailed toddaid").

The break before the gair cyrch is known as the gwant. The caesura at the middle of the first line is known as rhagwant.

The syllable before the caesura of the second line, rhyming with the gair cyrch, is y sillaf a gyrcher ("the syllable which is aimed at"). The military metaphor is also found in the englyn unodl union, where the half of the stanza with the toddaid byr is called the paladr ("shaft (of an arrow)"), while the other two lines are known as the esgyll ("feathers or fins").

== Accentuation ==
According to John Morris-Jones, in a 19 or 20-syllable toddaid, each line has exactly four accents, one of which is in the gair cyrch. For example:

Hawdd ddýdd ym y rhýdd, / rhwydd gýngor––dángos,
Hawdd nós hedd ágos / hóyw eiddígor.
("He gives me an easy day, a ready showing of counsel,
an easy night of peace close to the fine lord.")

In a toddaid byr, the second line has two accents:

Da_y rhed ar wáered / arw óror––ólwyn
Neu ẃylan / ar rýdfor;
("Well runs a wheel on a steep slope
Or a gull on a channel.")

Thus in a line like A Déwi / 'ngwlad yr húd ("And Dewi in the Land of Magic"), the accent of gwlad is suppressed to ensure that there are two accents.

== Cynghanedd ==
In addition to the obligatory rhymes or consonance described above, a toddaid is usually also ornamented with additional internal rhymes and consonance, a feature known as cynghanedd.

In the first line of a toddaid, whether long or short, the cynghanedd extends only as far as the dash. In the great majority of cases, the cynghanedd of the first line is cynghanedd sain, which combines both rhyme and consonance, for example:

Newidiwr, trwsiwr trysor––moliant,
("Trader, fashioner of treasure for the sake of praise")

The second line, when cross-rhyme is used, usually has either cynghanedd sain or cynghanedd groes. When cynghanedd sain is used, the whole of the verse from the gair cyrch to the end makes an extended cynghanedd sain with three rhymes:

Ni byddai, lle bai ball, hepgor––arnaw,
Ni bwyf fi hebddaw, barawdlaw bôr.
("There would not be, where there was [his] lack, [the ability] to do without him,
may I not be without him, lord with a ready hand.")

In most verses of toddaid byr, the end of line 1 is linked to the beginning of line 2 by consonantal cynghanedd. In this case the end of line 2 is left without any cynghanedd, as in this example by Tudur Aled, where cynghanedd sain is followed by cynghanedd gyrch:

Trugaredd Gwynedd / a'r gogoned––Dduw
I dduwies / y merched
("The mercy of Gwynedd and the glorious God
to the goddess of women.")

== Three types of toddaid ==
=== Toddaid ===
The regular 19-syllable toddaid consists of sections of 5 + 5 + 5 + 4 syllables, and so has exactly the same rhythm and length as the cyhydedd hir, but with a different rhyme scheme. The difference can be shown by the following two examples, which both come from the same poem, the Elegy for Llywelyn ap Gruffudd, a Prince of Wales who died in 1282, written by Gruffudd ab yr Ynad Coch..

The poem opens with a 19-syllable toddaid:

Oer calon dan fron / o fraw––allwynin
Am frenin, dderwin / ddôr, Aberfraw
("Cold is my heart beneath my breast from terror, grieving
For the king, oak door, of Aberffraw.")

Later in the same poem comes the following 19-syllable cyhydedd hir:

Llawer llef druan / fal ban fu Gamlan /
Llawer deigr dros ran / gwedi'r greiniaw.
("Many a wretched cry, as there was at Camlann,
Many a tear over the cheek after the rout.")

Here, each of the first three 5-syllable sections has the same rhyme, while the last section ends in the main rhyme ‑aw, which continues throughout the poem. Thus it can be seen that the main difference is that in the toddaid there is a repetition of the main rhyme before the end of line 1, while the secondary rhyme at the fifth syllable of line 1 is omitted.

The gair cyrch of a toddaid may be one, two, or three syllables long. In Dafydd ap Gwilym's poems, two is the most common length, then three, with one syllable being the least common.

As well as the obligatory rhymes, a toddaid is also usually ornamented with additional rhymes and alliteration, known as cynghanedd. In the above example, both lines contain cynghanedd sain, but not extending to the end of the line.

=== Toddaid hir ===
The 20-syllable toddaid hir is very similar to the regular toddaid but with 10 syllables in its second line. It occurs as part of the hir-a-thoddaid metre. The following example is by Tudur Aled (15th/16th century):

A thebyg byth yw / hebog––Mathrafal (~T)
I Frân ap Dyfnwal / a'r wyneb diofnog. (C)
("And ever similar is the hawk of Mathrafal
to Brân ap Dyfnwal with his fearless face.")

The first line of the above example has an irregular kind of cynghanedd draws in the consonantal echo thébyg ... hébog. The second line has cynghanedd groes, with the sounds {R N B D stressed vowel F N} in the first half repeated in the same order in the second half.

=== Toddaid byr ===
A toddaid byr ("short toddaid"), also called toddaid cwta ("curtailed toddaid"), is a toddaid with six syllables in the second line (in very early poems sometimes 5). A common use for the toddaid byr is as the first two lines of an englyn unodl union. It is also used, mixed with cyhydedd fer couplets, in the metre byr-a-thoddaid (see below).

==== Toddaid byr with consonance ====
It differs from the regular 19-syllable toddaid in that the gair cyrch is usually linked to the first half of line 2 by consonance rather than rhyme (but sometimes rhyme is used instead). The repetition of consonants linking the gair cyrch with the first half of line 2 is known as cynghanedd gyrch. As with cynghanedd groes, the repeated consonants must come in the same order and be wrapped around the stressed vowel in the same way each time.

In the following toddaid byr by Thomas Jones (19th century), the first line (as far as the dash) has cynghanedd sain, combining rhyme and alliteration (englyn a thelyn a thant). The gair cyrch (the words a'r gwléddoedd, "and the feasts") contains the consonants {R G L, stressed vowel, Dd}, which are echoed in the word arglwýddawl ("lordly") the first half of line 2:

Englyn a thelyn / a thant––a'r gwleddoedd (S)
Arglwyddawl / ddarfuant
("Englyn, harp, and string,
and the lordly feasts have vanished.")

Sometimes several consonants are repeated, as above, but sometimes a single consonant is sufficient to link the two lines, provided that it precedes or follows the stressed vowel in the same way in each line, as in the following examples by Dafydd ap Gwilym:

Arglwydd canonswydd, / unsud––Mordëyrn (S)
A Dewi / (yng) ngwlad yr hud,
("Lord who performs the office of a Canon, just like Mordeyrn
and Dewi in the Land of Magic")

Here -dëyrn and Déwi correspond, since each contains {D, stressed vowel}, which in turn is not followed by a consonant. Another example from Dafydd ap Gwilym is the following:

Da_y rhed ar waered / arw oror––olwyn (S)
Neu wylan / ar rydfor;
("Well runs a wheel on a steep slope
Or a gull on a narrow sea.")

Here ól- and ŵyl- correspond, since both have {stressed vowel, L}.

The following is more complex, since the dád of dádl is picked up by the dúd of Landúdoch, while the ádl of dádl is picked up by áedl:

Truan ac eirian, / pawb a garo––dadl, (S)
Aed Landudoch / heno;
("Let the wretched and the fair who love debate
go to Llandudoch tonight;")

Each of the four examples above has cynghanedd sain in the first line as far as the dash, combining rhyme and alliteration; then follows cynghanedd gyrch, consisting of consonantal matching spread across two lines. When the cynghanedd gyrch is consonantal, the second half of line 2 is always without cynghanedd.

It is also possible to have consonantal cynghanedd in the first line of a toddaid byr instead of cynghanedd sain, although this is less common. The following has cynghanedd draws in its first line:

Ni pheidia'_â Morfudd, / hoff adain––serchog (T)
Pes archai / Bab Rufain
("I will not give up Morfudd, fond affectionate bird,
Even if the Pope of Rome demanded it")

==== Toddaid byr with rhyme ====
Occasionally (but much less commonly) a toddaid byr has rhyme connecting the gair cyrch to the next line instead of consonant-matching. If so, the second line has cynghanedd all the way through. For example, in the following toddaid byr, both lines have cynghanedd sain:

O degwch, brifflwch / brafflyw––urddedig, (S)
Pendefig / rhyfig rhyw, (S)
("In beauty, strong dignified bountiful ruler,
haughty-natured aristocrat.")

The following has cynghanedd draws in line 1 as far as the dash, and cynghanedd groes in line 2:

Dihareb yw hon, / dywirir––ym mro, (T)
A laddo / a leddir. (C)
("This is a proverb, it will be proved true in the land,
'He who kills will be killed'.")

== The toddaid in early poetry ==
=== Englyn penfyr ===
The toddaid byr was in use in Welsh poetry at an early date. A short toddaid byr of 9 syllables + 5 is used in the three-line verse form known as englyn penfyr, such as this one from the 9th century:

Y ddeilen hon, neus cynired––gwynt
Gwae hi o'i thynged!
Hi hen; eleni ganed.
("This leaf, driven by the wind
Alas for its fate!
It is old; it was only this year it was born.")

The above toddaid joins the gair cyrch to the next line by consonance. The following englyn, with a toddaid of 8 syllables + 5, uses rhyme instead of consonance:

Oer lle llwch / rhag brythwch––gaeaf;
Crin cawn, / calaf trwch,
Cedig awel, / coed ym mlwch.
("Cold is the place of dust in the face of a winter blizzard;
Withered is the reed, broken the stalk,
Cruel is the wind, trees are in a box.")

=== Awdlau ===
The 19-syllable toddaid was also in use in awdlau ("odes with a unified rhyme") at an early date, for example in the poem known as Y Gododdin, which dates to the 9th century or earlier:

O'r sawl a weleis / ac a welaf––ym myd
Yn ymddwyn arf gryd / gwr-ýd gwriaf
("Of all those I have seen and will see in the world,
bearing a weapon in the roar of battle, I extol his bravery.")

The alliteration concentrated in the centre of the line around the caesura (weleis / ac a welaf, gryd / gwr-yd) is typical of poetry of the early period and is known as cynghanedd braidd gyffwrdd.

In this poem both toddaid and toddaid byr verses occur every now and then at irregular intervals, interspersed with lines of cyhydedd hir and cyhydedd naw ban.

== The toddaid in later poetry ==
The 14th to 17th centuries (from Dafydd ap Gwilym to Tudur Aled) are regarded as the classical period of Welsh-language poetry, when many of the most famous poets were active. (See Welsh poetry and Welsh-language literature.) During this time the metres allowed in formal poetry were strictly regulated, and each line was expected to be ornamented with cynghanedd.

In the 14th and 15th centuries 24 different traditional Welsh poetic metres were prescribed for use in formal poetry. Various of these metres are made by combining a toddaid either with itself or with other lengths of line, as shown below.

=== Englyn unodl union ===
The englyn unodl union is made of a toddaid byr followed by a couplet of cywydd deuair hirion. It is very commonly used even up to the present day.

The following example by the 14th-century poet Dafydd ap Gwilym has unconventional cynghanedd of the preclassical type in lines 1 and 3:

Heddiw y gwelais / yn gwyliaw––gwydrin (BG)
(A gwadraith / heb dygiaw) (Cy)
Llwydwallt prudd / yn cyhuddaw, (L)
Lledfryd dyn, / lledrad y daw. (C)
("Today I saw, looking in a glass
(and it's no use denying it)
Gloomy grey hair accusing;
The affliction of man, stealthily it comes.")

(BG) = cynghanedd braidd gyffwrdd, (Cy) = cynghanedd gyrch, (C) = cynghanedd groes, (L) = cynghanedd lusg.

The following is the first stanza of a poem lamenting the ruin of the house of Dafydd ap Gwilym's patron Ifor Hael at Bassaleg in South Wales. It was written by the 18th-century poet Evan Evans:

Llys Ifor Hael, gwael yw'r gwedd,––yn garnau (S)
Mewn gwerni / mae'n gorwedd; (Cy)
Drain ac ysgall / mall a'i medd, (S)
Mieri / lle bu mawredd. (T)
("The hall of Ifor Hael, a grievous sight—now rubble,
It lies in an alder swamp;
Thorns and evil thistles possess it,
Brambles where once was greatness.")

(S) = cynghanedd sain, (T) = cynghanedd draws. As well as cynghanedd gyrch, line 2 also has partial cynghanedd groes.

The following was written by John Morris-Jones (1864-1929):

Henaint ni ddaw ei hunan;––daw ag och (T)
Gydag ef / a chwynfan, (Cy)
Ac anhunedd maith / weithian, (L)
A huno maith / yn y man. (C)
"Old age does not come alone; it brings a sigh
With it, and complaining,
And long sleeplessness now,
And long sleeping by-and-by."

(L) = cynghanedd lusg.

=== Englyn unodl crwca ===
An englyn unodl crwca has the order of lines reversed: first a couplet of cywydd deuair hirion, followed by a toddaid byr. Although this is one of the 24 Traditional Welsh poetic metres, it is rarely used.

The following example, from a 19th-century gravestone in Pembrokeshire, has rhyme connecting the gair cyrch and the last line:

Gwir-riwiog, ddoeth, / gwraig dda, (C)
Hi oedd i'w gwr / hawddgara; (C)
A'i dawn eres / yn dynera;––mam wych, (C)
Burwych fel Debora.
("A truly dignified, wise, good wife
she was to her most amiable husband;
And her rare gift was most tender; an excellent mother,
very excellent like Deborah.")

=== Toddaid (metre) ===
Although other metres, such as gwawdodyn, were already used in the pre-classical period, it seems that the toddaid metre was first used in 14th century. The first poet to make a stanza out of two toddaid verses is thought to have been Gwilym Ddu o Arfon in his ode to Sir Gruffudd Llwyd imprisoned in Rhuddlan Castle in the 1320s.

According to John Morris-Jones poems in this metre are made of 4-line stanzas each consisting of two toddaid verses. In one of Dafydd ap Gwilym's poems (the Ode for Ifor Hael) this is clearly the case, with the name Ifor coming at the end of every fourth line. In another poem, however, (the Elegy for Ifor and Nest) there are 15 toddaid verses, which, since they all have the same rhyme, seem to form a continuous series.

This is a highly ornamental metre, difficult to compose, and not much used today. Not only does each line of the toddaid part of the poem have the same main rhyme, but the same letters also begin each line (a feature known as cymeriad llythrennol). There is also cynghanedd in every line, resulting in extra internal rhymes and alliteration.

The 14th-century poet Dafydd ap Gwilym used the metre in five poems. These are the praise poems Awdl i Ifor Hael, Marwnad Ifor a Nest, Moliant Llywelyn ap Gwilym, and Marwnad Angharad, and the satirical Dychan i Rys Meigen. The religious poem I Iesu Grist also uses the metre, but for stylistic and other reasons is thought not to be by Dafydd. In each poem the toddaid verses are preceded by a number of englyn unodl union stanzas.

The final stanza of Dafydd's poem Marwnad Angharad ("Lament for Angharad") is as follows:

Gwenwyn ym ei chŵyn, / ni chad––o'm ystlys, (S)
Gwanas gywirlys, / gŵn ysgarlad. (C)
Gwaith drwg i olwg / fyddai wyliad––caeth, (S)
Gwaeth, cyfyng hiraeth, / cof Angharad. (C)
("The lament for her is poison for me, it cannot be moved from my body,
buttress of a true court, scarlet gown.
Ceaseless weeping would be bad work for the eyes,
worse is the memory of Angharad, terrible grief.")

Here (S) = cynghanedd sain, (C) = cynghanedd groes.

Dafydd Nanmor (15th century) used the metre in his lament for Tomas ap Rhys from Tywyn. One of the verses is as follows:

Aml wylaw mal glaw / ar glawr––y Deau. (S)
Aml llif o dremau, / aml llef dramawr. (C)
Aml i mae oer wae / am wawr––anneirif, (S)
Aml drem a wnâi'r llif, / aml dŵr mewn llawr. (C)
("Tears fall thick as rain across the land of the South.
Frequent is the weeping from eyes, and frequent a mighty crying.
Frequent is bitter grief for every countless dawn;
Many an eye sheds tears, much is the water in the earth.")

A 20th-century poem in this metre is the "Song of the Angels" from Geraint Bowen's ode Awdl Foliant i'r Amaethwr ("In Praise of the Farmer"), which won the bardic chair at the 1946 Eisteddfod. This consists of 11 four-line toddaid stanzas, with an englyn unodl union at the beginning and end. One of the stanzas reads:

Am ffrwythau a had / gwastadedd––y wlad, (L)
Cnu oen a dafad, / cain edafedd; (C)
Am amlhau â'r iau / a'r wedd––yr hadau, (S)
Dyger â rhaffau / deg orhoffedd. (C)

("For the fruits and seed of the country’s plains,
The fleece of lamb and sheep, fine threads;
For multiplying the seeds with the yoke and the team,
Let ten great delights be brought with ropes.")

Here (L) = cynghanedd lusg, (S) = cynghanedd sain, (C) = cynghanedd groes.

=== Gwawdodyn ===
The metre gwawdodyn byr is an old form consisting of two lines of nine syllables followed by a toddaid. In each line there is a caesura usually at the 5th syllable. An example is this verse by Wiliam Llŷn (16th century):

Mawr y sych y gwynt / helynt hwyliad, (S)
Mawr y gwlych y glaw / pan ddel cawad, (L)
Mawr gryfdwr yw'r dŵr / ar doriad––gweilgi, (S)
Mwy yw'r daioni / ym mro Danad. (C)
("Great is the dryness of wind, a trouble for sailing,
Great is the wetness of the rain when a shower comes,
Great strength has the water at the breaking of the sea,
But greater is the goodness in the Tanat Valley.")

As well as the obligatory rhymes, the poet has used cynghanedd in every line: (L) = cynghanedd lusg, (S) = cynghanedd sain, (C) = cynghanedd groes.

A similar metre called gwawdodyn hir also exists, which has four 9-syllable lines followed by a toddaid.

=== Byr-a-thoddaid ===
The metre byr-a-thoddaid consists of passages where eight-syllable lines are begun and ended with a toddaid byr. Often one toddaid has consonance and the other has rhyme. The following example is by Wiliam Llŷn (16th century) from his poem I Ferch ("To a girl") written to illustrate the different metres:

Doeth gywir, feinir, / fwynion — eiriau gwir, (S)
Da tybir, / d'atebion; (C)
Deuliw manod,_/_aeliau meinion, (CoG)
D'air a danwyd_/_i'r dewinion, (CoG)
D'air â'n agos / drwy anogion, (C)
D'air aeth hefyd_/_i'r eithafion: (CoG)
Doethgar a hawddgar / yw hon — digymar (S)
Dig afar, / dy gofion. (C)
("Wise and true, gentle maiden, — true words,
Well-judged are your replies;
Of the dual color of drifted snow, with delicate brows,
Your word was sent to the wise sages,
Your word brought us close through promptings,
Your word also went to the extremes:
Wise and lovely is she, matchless;
Free of wrath, are your thoughts.")

(S) = cynghanedd sain, (C) = cynghanedd groes ,(CoG) = cynghanedd groes o gyswllt. The second toddaid byr has both consonance and rhyme.

=== Hir-a-thoddaid ===
This metre consists of four ten-syllable lines, followed by a 20-syllable toddaid hir. An example given by Einion Offeiriad (in modernised spelling) is the following:

Gwynfyd gwŷr y byd / oedd fod Angharad,
Gwenfun yn gyfun / a’i gwiwfawr gariad.
Gwanllun a’m lludd hun, / hoenddwg barabliad,
Gwynlliw eiry, difriw, / difrisg ymdeithiad,
Gwen (dan aur wiwlen / leddf edrychiad––gŵyl)
yw f’annwyl, yn 'i hwyl / heul gymheiriad.
("The bliss of the world’s men was that Angharad,
the fair maid, was united with her worthy, great love.
Her faint form hinders my sleep, her lively speech is sorrow-bringing;
she is of the whiteness of snow, a gentle, trackless journeyer.
Fair (under a worthy golden veil, of tender modest glance)
is my beloved, in her bright disposition, a companion to the sun.")

As well as the obligatory rhymes, the poem is ornamented with internal rhymes on the 2nd and 5th syllables of each line. In lines 2-6 there is also cynghanedd braidd gyffwrdd, that is consonant matching of the words in the centre of the line (hwyl / heul etc.), typical of the pre-classical period. This is the only metre in which a 20-syllable toddaid is found.

=== Englyn toddaid ===
The Englyn toddaid is a relatively recent invention, since there are apparently no examples before the 18th century. It consists of a toddaid byr followed by a 19-syllable or 20-syllable toddaid.

The following was written on a tombstone (now lost) of a certain Michael Evans of Llanerch-y-medd, Anglesey, with a play on the name Llanerch-y-medd in the last line:

Corff Michael yn wael / ei wedd,––ŵr dawnus, (S)
A roed danaf / i orwedd; (Cy)
Trist gweled weithian / ei annedd,––Oerddu, (L)
(Llon iwrch a fu) / a Llannerch-ei-fedd. (C)
("Michael's body is in a poor state, a talented man,
Who was placed beneath me to lie;
Sad it is now to see his dwelling, dark and cold,
(a cheerful roebuck he was!) and "Llannerch-his-grave".")

The following example, with a 10-syllable last line, is by the 20th-century poet Gwilym Tilsley in his poem Cwm Carnedd:

Cwm y brad / a'r ymado,––ni welwyd (L)
Eilwaith / ffyniant ynddo; (Cy)
I'r gwan / a drigai yno––mawr fu baich (T)
Gyrru gwŷr hoenfraich / o greigiau'r henfro. (C)
("The valley of treachery and departure, there was not seen
a second time prosperity in it;
for the weak who dwelt there, great was the burden
of driving strong-armed men from the rocks of the old land.")

The lines in the above example have cynghanedd but not all according to classical patterns. The first line has cynghanedd lusg, which was not found in a toddaid byr in the classical period, and there is no central caesura; the third line has cynghanedd draws but unconventionally since the stressed vowels do not match. The fourth line, however, has conventional cynghanedd groes with matching consonants {G R G R H (stressed vowel) N F R} in each half.

== Bibliography ==
- Bollard, J. K.; Griffiths, A. (2019). Cymru Dafydd ap Gwilym: Dafydd ap Gwilym's Wales. (Gwasg Carreg Gwalch, Llanrwst)
- Crawford, T. D. (1985). "The Englynion of Dafydd ap Gwilym". Études Celtiques. 22: 235–285.
- Crawford, T. D. (1990). "The Toddaid and Gwawdodyn byr in the poetry of Dafydd ap Gwilym, with an Appendix concerning the Traethodlau attributed to him". Études Celtiques. 27: 301–336. doi:10.3406/ecelt.1990.1935.
- Lloyd, D. M. (1968). "Some metrical features in Gogynfeirdd poetry". Studia Celtica 3, 38–46.
- Morris-Jones, John (1925). Cerdd Dafod, Oxford. (in Welsh)
- Myrddin ap Dafydd Clywed Cynghanedd: cwrs cerdd dafod (in Welsh)
