= Morgan ap Maredudd =

A leader of the Welsh revolt of 1294–1295

Morgan ap Maredudd sometimes referred to as “Morgan the Rebel” (flourished 1270–1316), rebel, of Glamorgan.

== Life ==
He was the son of Maredudd ap Gruffudd (c.1234-c.1275) the last Welsh lord of Caerleon of Machen, and Maud, daughter of Cadwallon.

Owing to grievances against the de Clares, when his family was deprived of its estates by Gilbert de Clare, 7th Earl of Gloucester, he claimed to be at war only against the lords of Glamorgan. During 1283, he supported the rebellion of Dafydd ap Gruffydd, prince of Wales. He was the leader of the Glamorgan insurgents during the rising of Madog ap Llywelyn in 1294–5; under his leadership, the Welsh captured castles at Kenfig, Llangibby, and Morlais. Morgan submitted to king Edward I and in 1297, he became an esquire of Edward's household and his agent in south Wales.

== Family ==
His daughter, Angharad, married Llewelyn ap Ifor, Lord of St. Clere. Angharad and Llewelyn were the parents of Ifor ap Llywelyn (Ifor Hael), to whom the poet Dafydd ap Gwilym addressed several poems.

== See also ==
- Madog ap Llywelyn

== Sources ==
- Lloyd, John Edward (1894). "Morgan (fl.1294-1295)" . In Lee, Sidney (ed.). Dictionary of National Biography. Vol. 39. London: Smith, Elder & Co.
- Griffiths, R. A., ‘Morgan ap Maredudd (fl. 1270–1316)’, Oxford Dictionary of National Biography, first published September 2004
