= The Wave (poem) =

Poem by Gruffudd Gryg

"The Wave" (Welsh: "I'r Don") is a Welsh-language cywydd by the mid 14th-century poet Gruffudd Gryg. It is a llatai poem, which is to say one in which an animal or inanimate object is sent bearing a message of love. In this case an ocean wave is sent by the poet's beloved in Anglesey, and reaches him as he returns by ship from a pilgrimage to Santiago de Compostela. It is thought to have been written in or about the 1370s. "The Wave" is a widely acclaimed poem, and has been compared favourably with the finest poems of Dafydd ap Gwilym, who is often considered the greatest of the Welsh poets.

== Summary ==
This is based on the version by H. Idris Bell, for which see Translation, below.

In the first section the poet describes a terrific wave in the ocean off Spain, comparing it to a rampart, a wound, a dragon, a mountain, the sea's brain, and "yeast for the ale that the whales brew". (Note: Thomas Parry renders this as "Yeast for the ale sea-horses brew".) He also expresses the feelings of fear it provokes in him. In the second section the wave and the poet converse. The wave says that it has been sent to him by the maid Goleuddydd, who has long grieved for him, to ask if he is still alive. The poet replies that she has been the cause of much sorrow to him, and asks for news of her. Is she true to him? The wave says that she will not remain true if he does not return to her soon, for love at a distance cannot last. The poet again addresses this Offa's Dyke, Milky Way, jewelled path, white anchoress. Will it bear him back to his lover? If so, he swears he will wander no more.

== Date ==
"The Wave" is one of a group of three cywyddau by Gruffudd Gryg relating to his pilgrimage by sea to the shrine of St James at Santiago de Compostela. The other two are an address to the moon reproaching it for causing a storm at sea on his outward journey, and a nostalgic description of the island of Anglesey, written in Spain. The poem to the moon contains the only clue to the dating of this group, a reference to the storm having thrown his ship onto tir Harri, "Henry's land". This was interpreted by Ifor Williams and Thomas Roberts as meaning England under the rule of Henry IV, whose accession in 1399 would on this reading mark the earliest date the poems could have been written. The discovery in 1957 of legal documents from the 1330s which name Gruffudd Gryg, apparently as an adult, rendered this hypothesis implausible, but the Henry in question has more recently been reidentified as Henry II of Castile, who reigned from 1369 to 1379. For most of Henry II's reign Castile and England were enemies, making Santiago too dangerous a destination for English and Welsh pilgrims, but there was a brief truce from 1375 to 1377. Gruffudd Gryg's most recent editors believe that his pilgrimage must have taken place in 1376.

== Themes and treatment ==
"The Wave" is a poem expressing Gruffudd's homesickness as, on board a ship in a Spanish harbour, he awaits favourable weather for his return journey. It is also a cywydd llatai, a love poem in which a non-human messenger is sent to the beloved, in this case one of the massive North Atlantic billows for which the Bay of Biscay is known. It involves a lengthy passage of dyfalu, description by the use of many far-fetched and imaginative metaphors and images, which might be seen as the main purpose of the poem; the poet expresses both admiration and fear of the wave, turning in the dialogue section into comic deference when he realizes that it has come from his lady. But "The Wave" is also a love poem in which the beloved, unusually for a medieval poem, is seen as potentially inconstant. She is described in other poems by Gruffudd as having eyes the colour of a ripe berry or a cow, coral and gold cheeks, a neck whiter than a swan or a seagull, and a fine mouth which delivers wise words. He calls her here by the name Goleuddydd, as does Dafydd ap Gwilym when in his elegy for Gruffudd Gryg he describes his friend as the "bard of water-bright Goleuddydd".

== Analogues ==
There are several references to pilgrimages and to the Santiago grave of St James in medieval Welsh poetry, for example in Dafydd ap Gwilym's poem "A Girl's Pilgrimage". "The Wave" was seen by the scholar Thomas Parry as being a poem very much in Dafydd's manner, resembling him in its use of humour and dyfalu. Most 14th-century cywyddau llatai were Dafydd's work, notably his "The Wind", which, like "The Wave", uses an elemental llatai or messenger, and "The Wave on the River Dyfi", which resembles Gruffudd's poem not just in its subject but in points of phrasing and imagery.

== Reception ==
Some of the greatest figures in Welsh Studies have bestowed high praise on "The Wave", comparing it to Dafydd ap Gwilym's poems. Thomas Parry wrote that the poem's dyfalu showed all his "intricate skill", and Dafydd Johnston that it was "every bit as inventive" as his llatai poems. Rachel Bromwich was of the opinion that "The Wave" was one of "a handful of highly original and exceptional cywyddau which deserve to be placed on a par with Dafydd's finest work". Sir Ifor Williams went even further, considering its mastery of description to be not just as good but perhaps better. Gruffudd's most recent editors have claimed that it is "[one] of the most extraordinary cywyddau ever written."

== Translation ==
The only complete translation of "The Wave", by H. Idris Bell, appeared in the volume for the 1942 session (published in 1944) of The Transactions of the Honourable Society of Cymmrodorion. See External links, below.

== Editions ==
- Williams, Ifor; Roberts, Thomas, eds. (1935) [1914]. Cywyddau Dafydd ap Gwilym a'i Gyfoeswyr. Caerdydd: Gwasg Prifysgol Cymru. pp. 137–139.
- Lewis, Barry J.; Salisbury, Eurig, eds. (2010). Gwaith Gruffudd Gryg. Cyfres Beirdd yr Uchelwyr, 37. Aberystwyth: Canolfan Uwchefrydiau Cymreig a Cheltaidd Prifysgol Cymru. pp. 68–70. ISBN 9780947531782.
