= To the Yew Tree Above Dafydd ap Gwilym's Grave =

14th-century Welsh-language poem

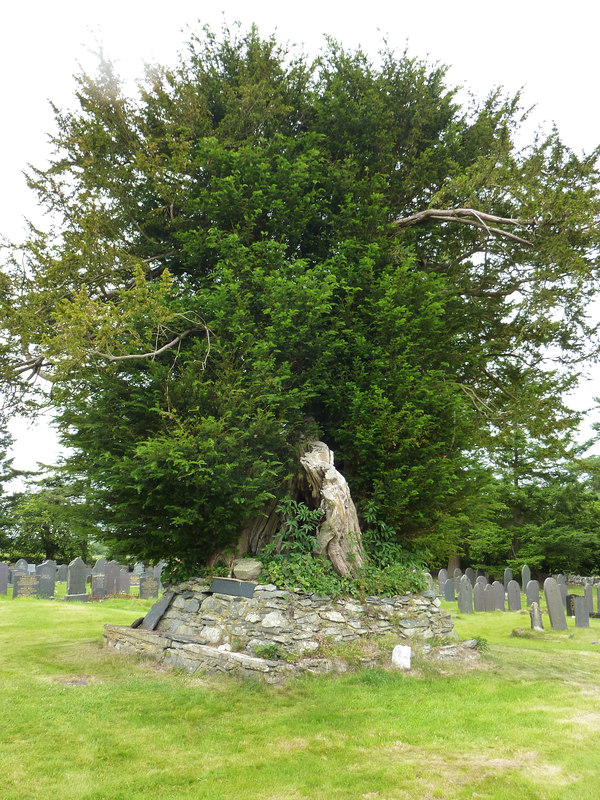
The yew at Strata Florida Abbey now said to mark Dafydd ap Gwilym's grave

"To the Yew Tree Above Dafydd ap Gwilym's Grave" (Welsh: Yr Ywen uwchben Bedd Dafydd ap Gwilym) is a 14th-century Welsh-language poem in the form of a cywydd, and is usually seen as either an elegy written after the death of Dafydd ap Gwilym or a mock-elegy addressed to him during his lifetime. Its author, Gruffudd Gryg, also wrote another elegy or mock-elegy on his friend Dafydd, and conducted a controversy in verse with him in which Dafydd's poems were criticised and defended. The cywydd on the yew tree constitutes the main evidence for the widespread belief that Dafydd is buried at Strata Florida Abbey (also known as Ystrad Fflur) in Ceredigion. It has been called "a superb poem, perhaps Gruffudd Gryg's best...a remarkably sensitive and perceptive act of poetic homage that acknowledges, far more than any more direct statement ever could, Dafydd's status as a true athro for his generation". It was included in both The Oxford Book of Welsh Verse and The Penguin Book of Welsh Verse.

== Poem ==
Yew at Strata Florida, God's blessing on you! King David prophesied you, and Dafydd described you as his house of green leaves, a castle shielding the dead from the icy wind, "as good as the tree of rods of old". You are noble in every part. Beneath is buried "the beehive of englynion". Woe to Dyddgu, the poet's mistress! May you, good motherly yew, serve the Lord and protect Dafydd's grave. Do not move one step. Goats shall not despoil you, fire shall not burn you, nor shall any carpenter, cobbler or wood-gatherer damage you. Leaves are your covering, yours is a good place. May God glorify your miracles.

== Sources ==
Striking similarities show that Gruffudd's poem was influenced by Dafydd's "The Holly Grove". Both cywyddau are addressed directly to evergreen trees, both promise safe houses to the poet, and both promise that that house will not have its leaves eaten by goats. Gruffudd draws in addition on the imagery of Dafydd's "The Roebuck", "The Wind", and perhaps "The Spear".

The poem also shows the influence of the Ystorya Adaf ("Story of Adam"), a Biblical legend which tells how a threefold tree which grew from three seeds planted in Adam's grave became in turn the staff of Moses, the tree beneath which David repented his adultery with Bathsheba, and finally the True Cross. Gruffudd compares the yew to "the tree of rods of old", refers to it as trybedd, "three-footed", and calls on the yew not to move a step in allusion to an episode of the Ystorya in which the three rods raise themselves from the ground and take root.

== Genre ==
In the 14th century it was common for poets to write, during the subject's lifetime, fictitious elegies to their fellow-poets, and it is often difficult to distinguish these false elegies from the true ones. In the case of "To the Yew Tree", Sir Thomas Parry, D. J. Bowen, Dafydd Johnston, Huw Meirion Edwards, John K. Bollard and R. Geraint Gruffydd have maintained that it was written after Dafydd's death, On the other hand, Barry Lewis, Rachel Bromwich and other scholars have given arguments for believing that it was written to the living Dafydd, Bromwich pointing out that Gruffudd's poem mixes levity with its seriousness, its echoes of Dafydd's poetry being sometimes used to ludicrous effect; indeed she believed that all elegies of this period addressed by one poet to another must be presumed to be mock-elegies. A third way was proposed by Sir Ifor Williams, who contended that the poem, though written after Dafydd's death, is not an elegy of any kind, the subject being the yew itself rather than the poet. The issue of whether this poem was written before or after Dafydd's death is an important one, because it is the only historical evidence corroborating the tradition, known to have existed since the 18th century, that he was buried at Strata Florida. Other early sources state that he was buried at Talley Abbey in Carmarthenshire.

== The legacy at Strata Florida ==
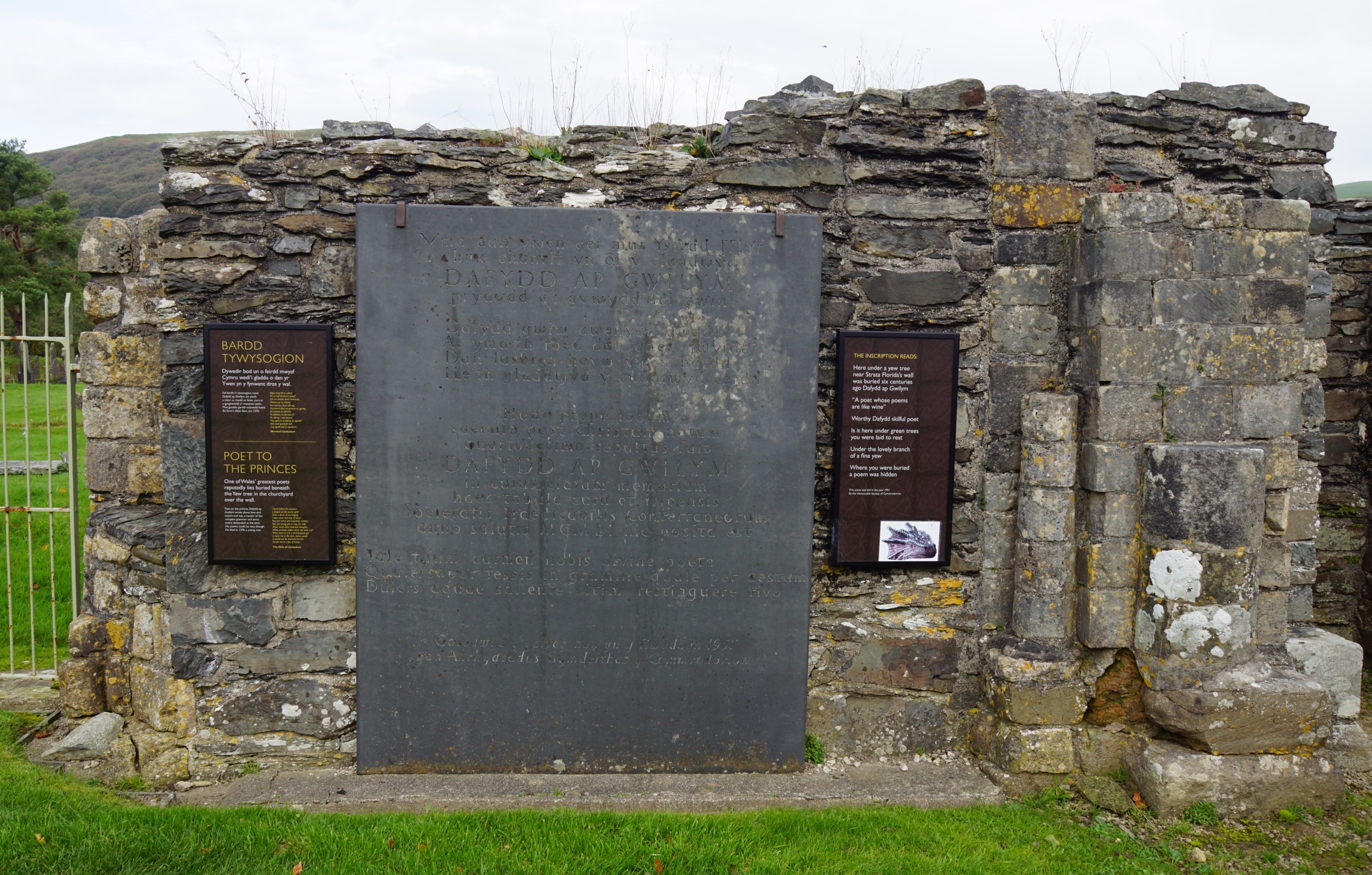
The memorial to Dafydd ap Gwilym at Strata Florida

In the 1530s John Leland wrote of Strata Florida that "The coemiteri wherin the cunteri about doth buri is veri large, and meanely waullid with stoone. In it be xxxix great hue trees." In 1810 the antiquary Samuel Rush Meyrick reported that only a few were left, and when George Borrow visited in 1854 in the course of a journey through Wales he found just two. He decided that the one growing north-east of the church looked the more ancient, and therefore paid his homage to Dafydd ap Gwilym by reciting a poem beneath that yew. Postcards dating from the early 20th century label this one Dafydd ap Gwilym's Yew, and it still survives. In more recent years, however, the yew closer to the church, by its north wall, has become known as Dafydd's, perhaps because it looks more impressive, and in 1951 a memorial plaque was installed near it. Though there is no particular historical evidence in favour of either yew's claims it is at any rate possible that they were saved from felling because of traditions connecting them with Dafydd ap Gwilym. But it is also possible that the genuine yew over Dafydd's grave had disappeared by the 16th century, as seems to be implied by the titles given to the poem in two manuscripts of that date: I'r Ywen a oedd uwch ben Bedd D. Gwilym ("To the Yew that was above the Grave of D Gwilym") and I'r Ywen a dyf uwch ben Bedd Daf Gwilym ("To the Yew that grew above the grave of Daf Gwilym").

== The poetic legacy ==
Gruffudd Gryg is far from being the only poet who, in writing about Strata Florida, has invoked the figure of Dafydd, and several have specifically dealt with the yew over his grave or with Gruffudd Gryg's cywydd. An anonymous poem comprising two englynion, described by William Owen as Dafydd's epitaph, asks "Is it here that you were put under green wood, under a green tree, lively, handsome yew tree?". George Borrow, recounting his Welsh journey in Wild Wales (1862), gives us the text of the poem he addressed to the yew at Dafydd's grave, consisting of a mixture of lines from "The Yew Tree" and others of his own composition. T. Gwynn Jones's Welsh-language lyric "Ystrad Fflur", written in 1920, includes, in Edwin Stanley James's translation, a reference to Dafydd's tomb "where the sombre yew-trees wave". Harri Webb's poem "Thanks in Winter" commemorates the day he visited Dafydd's grave in 1965 as "a pilgrim under the yew at Ystrad Fflur". Gwyn Williams's "At Ystrad Fflur" mentions

...that great protective mother,
a yew-tree under which "the best of lads" according
to Gruffudd Gryg is buried. The caretaker
tells me he's sure this is the spot, his grass-cutter
gives him trouble around the tree and he himself
is disturbed.

The yew marking Dafydd's grave is evoked in other recent poems: Moelwyn Merchant's Dafydd lies at Ystrad Fflur, Martin Locock's "Gorffwysfa Dafydd ap Gwilym", Kathy Miles's "The Creed of Cataloguing", and Anthony Kendrew's "Strata Florida".

== English translations and paraphrases ==
- Bell, David, in Bell, H. Idris; Bell, David (1942). Fifty Poems. Y Cymmrodor, vol. 48. London: Honourable Society of Cymmrodorion. pp. 307, 309. With the Middle Welsh original in parallel text.
- Bollard, John K., ed. (2019). Cymru Dafydd ap Gwilym/Dafydd ap Gwilym's Wales: Cerddi a Lleoedd/Poems and Places. Dyffryn Conwy: Gwasg Carreg Gwalch. pp. 106–107. ISBN 9781845277192. With the Middle Welsh original in parallel text.
- Clancy, Joseph P. (1965). Medieval Welsh Lyrics. London: Macmillan. pp. 129–130.
- Conran, Anthony; Williams, J. E. Caerwyn, eds. (1967). The Penguin Book of Welsh Verse. Harmondsworth: Penguin. pp. 157–158. ISBN 9780140420968.
- Gurney, Robert, ed. (1969). Bardic Heritage. London: Chatto & Windus. pp. 148–149. ISBN 0701113286.
- Johnston, Dafydd, in Locock, Martin, ed. (2013). Poetry from Strata Florida: An Anthology of Work Inspired by the Ystrad Fflur Landscape, 1350–2013. Ammanford: Carreg Ffylfan Press. pp. 17–19. ISBN 9780956506757.
- Loomis, Richard Morgan, ed. (1982). Dafydd ap Gwilym: The Poems. Binghamton: Center for Medieval & Early Renaissance Studies. p. 288. ISBN 0866980156.
- Norris, Leslie (1974). Mountains, Polecats, Pheasants and Other Elegies. London: Chatto and Windus: Hogarth Press. pp. 14–15. ISBN 0701120207.
