= Summer (poem) =

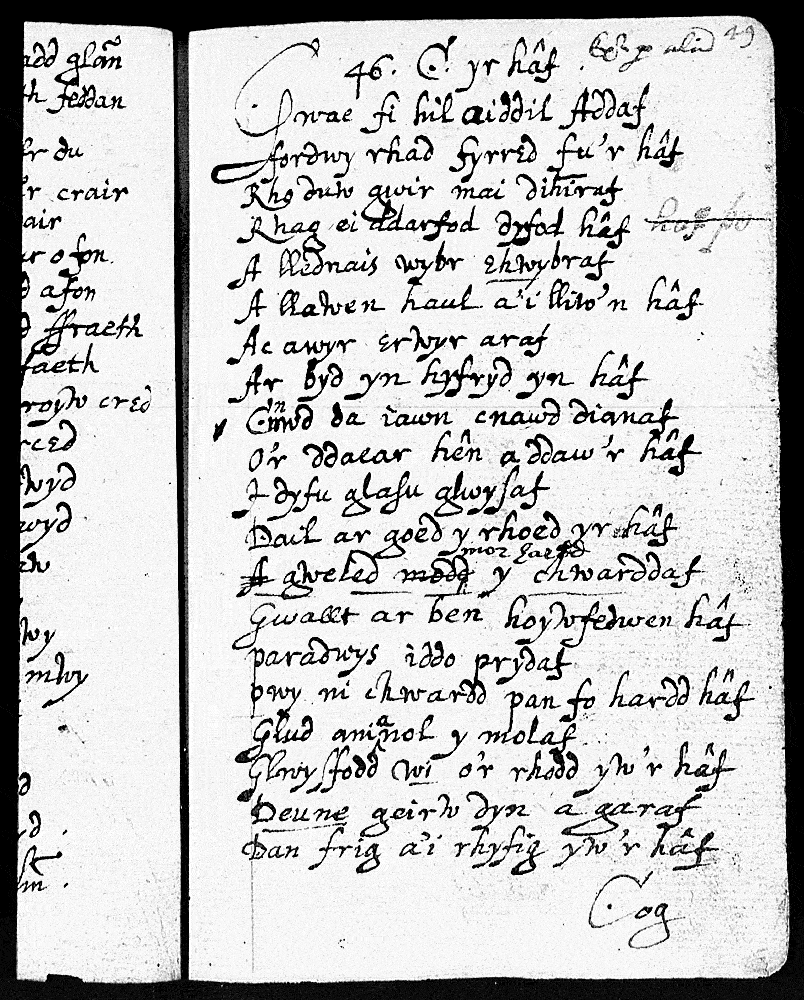
The opening lines of the poem in MS Peniarth 49, f.49^{r}

"Summer", known in Welsh as "Yr Haf", is a 14th-century Welsh poem in the form of a cywydd by Dafydd ap Gwilym, widely seen as the greatest of the Welsh poets. The poem celebrates summer as the season of love and natural beauty, while lamenting its inevitable end in winter. It is a work of technical virtuosity, using monorhyme throughout. Admired for its beauty, it has been widely translated.

== Summary ==
The poem describes the coming of summer as vexatious because it is short-lived. The weather is fine, the crops have grown, and the trees are covered in green leaves. The poem describes this as beautiful, like Paradise. The birds sing for the poet and his girl. Eiddig, the Jealous One, is said to not care for summer because it was made for lovers. The poet goes to the greenwood to meet his girl, but summer will turn to the cold of autumn and winter.

"Alas, Christ," I ask,
"if it makes off so soon, where is summer?"

== Themes ==
"Summer" is written in the style of the praise-poems written by the earlier Poets of the Princes to their patrons, with the difference that Dafydd's praise is directed at summer, the season of lovers when the poet can resort to the greenwood with his girl, and when the burgeoning beauty of nature mirrors the satisfaction of body and mind. But the joy in summer that fills the poem is qualified throughout by the ever-present knowledge that summer is transitory, and that it must always give place eventually to winter. So strong, in fact, are his love of summer and hatred of winter as to become positively theological: summer is the time when the poet can experience something of the bliss of the Earthly Paradise, with the corollary that the onset of winter is like the Fall of man. Furthermore, the poem by implication laments the impermanence not just of the seasons but of all things, including human life itself; it has been called a concrete expression of the basic metaphysical question, why do things fade rather than remain?

== Poetic technique ==
This is one of only two cywyddau by Dafydd – the other is "May" – in which, in addition to the normal exigencies of cywydd form he confines himself to rhyming on the same word through its entire length, in this case haf, 'summer'. Cywyddau always rhyme stressed final syllables, such as the word haf, with unstressed ones, and this gives Dafydd the opportunity to use as rhyme-words verbs in the first person and adjectives in the superlative degree, such as "best". The use of monorhyme, though rare in Dafydd's cywyddau, was common in the awdlau of the 12th and 13th-century Welsh court poets, and is used by Dafydd himself in his Awdl i Ifor Hael.

== Sources ==
Dafydd introduces the character of Eiddig, the jealous husband, not only in this but in several others of his cywyddau, as did a number of his contemporaries. Eiddig is, here and in some of the other poems, identified with the winter, suggesting the possibility that he had come to be associated with March ap Meirchion, the jealous husband in the legend of Trystan and Esyllt (Tristan and Iseult). The Ystorya Trystan, a Welsh tale of uncertain date, tells us that when March was given the choice of possessing Esyllt when there were leaves on the trees or when there were not, he chose the latter; to which Esyylt responded that he would never have her, since the holly, the yew, and the ivy always keep their leaves. Dafydd, perhaps, had some version of this story in his mind.

It also been suggested that Dafydd's use of the jealous husband character and his description of the summer scene as a bird-filled paradise may both derive from a similar passage in Guillaume de Lorris' Roman de la Rose. Even his description of himself as dyn Ofydd, "Ovid's man", could perhaps be seen as "an allusion to his engagement with the Ovidian matter of the Roman", Ovid being for many medieval poets, including Dafydd, the fount of all wisdom in matters of love.

== Manuscripts ==
The poem survives in 28 manuscripts, including the National Library of Wales's MS Cwrtmawr 5, dating from c. 1600, and MS 560B (mid-17th century); Cardiff Central Library MS 1.2 (1600–1604); and Bodleian Library MS Welsh e 1 (c. 1612–1623). It is also known to have been copied, in the 1470s or 1480s, into the White Book of Hergest, a manuscript which was destroyed by fire in 1810. It was transcribed from there into two manuscripts now in the National Library of Wales: MS Peniarth 49 (1595–1617), and MS Wynnstay 2 (mid-17th century).

== Modern editions ==
- Williams, Ifor; Roberts, Thomas, eds. (1935) [1914]. Cywyddau Dafydd ap Gwilym a'i Gyfoeswyr. Caerdydd: Gwasg Prifysgol Cymru. pp. 84–86.
- Parry, Thomas, ed. (1952). Gwaith Dafydd ap Gwilym. Caerdydd: Gwasg Prifysgol Cymru. pp. 70–72.
- Evans, Dylan Foster, ed. (2007). "34 – Yr Haf". Dafydd ap Gwilym.net. Welsh Department, Swansea University/Centre for Advanced Welsh and Celtic Studies, University of Wales.

== Translations and paraphrases ==
- Bromwich, Rachel, ed. (1982). Dafydd ap Gwilym: A Selection of Poems. Llandysul: Gomer Press. pp. 6, 8. ISBN 0850888158. With the Middle Welsh original in parallel text.
- Clancy, Joseph P. (1965). Medieval Welsh Lyrics. London: Macmillan. pp. 69–70.
  - Rev. repr. in his The Poems of Dafydd ap Gwilym. Bath: Brown Dog. 2016. pp. 212–213. ISBN 9781785450891.
- Evans, Dylan Foster (2007). "34 – Yr Haf". Dafydd ap Gwilym.net. Welsh Department, Swansea University/Centre for Advanced Welsh and Celtic Studies, University of Wales. With the Middle Welsh original in parallel text.
- Ford, Patrick K., ed. (1999). The Celtic Poets: Songs and Tales from Early Ireland and Wales. Belmont, MA: Ford & Bailie. pp. 268–270. ISBN 9780926689053.
- Gurney, Robert, ed. (1969). Bardic Heritage. London: Chatto & Windus. pp. 97–98.
- Loomis, Richard Morgan, ed. (1982). Dafydd ap Gwilym: The Poems. Binghamton: Center for Medieval & Early Renaissance Studies. pp. 91–92. ISBN 0866980156.
  - Rev. repr. in Loomis, Richard; Johnston, Dafydd (1992). Medieval Welsh Poems. Binghamton: Medieval & Renaissance Texts & Studies. pp. 49–50. ISBN 0866981020.
- Sims-Williams, Patrick (1983). "Dafydd ap Gwilym (Mid Fourteenth Century)". In Ford, Boris (ed.). Medieval Literature: The European Inheritance. The New Pelican History of English Literature, 1 (Part 2). Harmondsworth: Penguin. pp. 542–543. ISBN 9780140222722.
- Thomas, Gwyn, ed. (2001). Dafydd ap Gwilym: His Poems. Cardiff: University of Wales Press. pp. 53–54. ISBN 0708316646.
- Watson, Giles (2014). Dafydd ap Gwilym: Paraphrases and Palimpsests. npp. pp. 164–165. ISBN 9781291866803.
