= May (poem) =

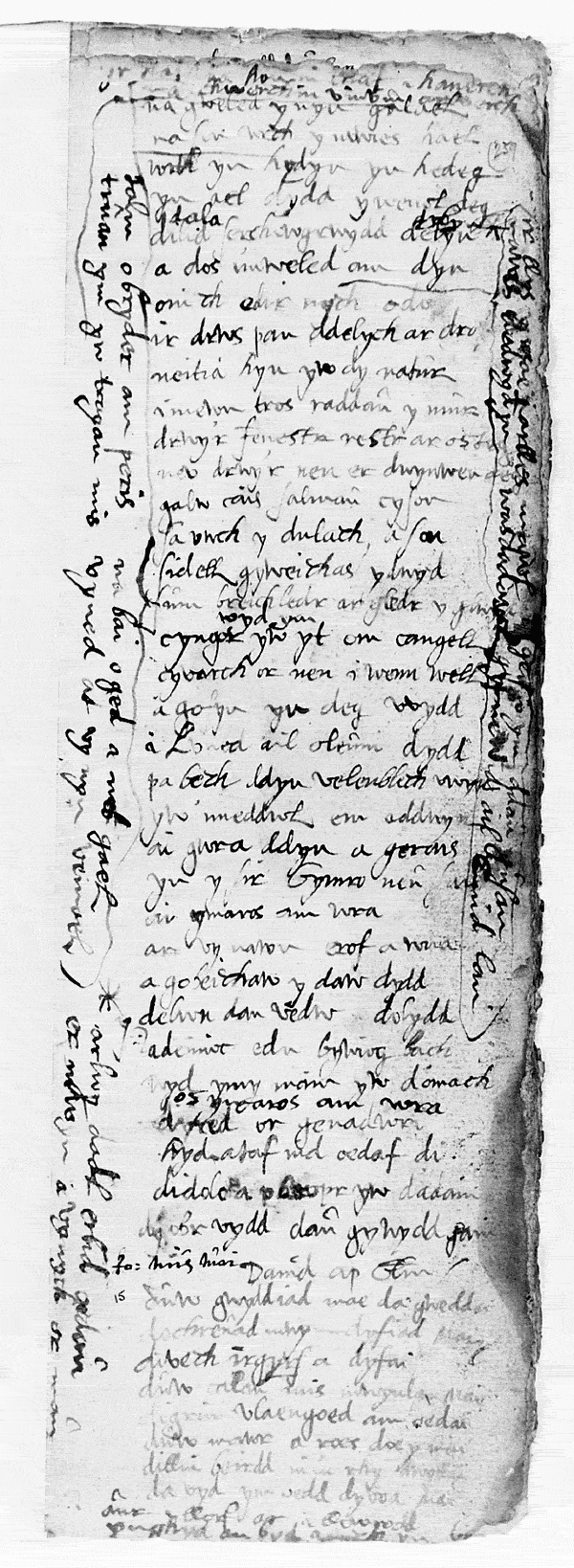
Cardiff Central Library MS 4.330 [= H26], a 16th-century manuscript of the poem

"May", "May Month" or "The Month of May", known in Welsh as "Mis Mai", is a 14th-century Welsh poem in the form of a cywydd by Dafydd ap Gwilym, widely seen as the greatest of the Welsh poets. The poem celebrates May, and specifically May Day, as the beginning of summer, the season in which the poet can make assignations to woo young women in the woods, though since the woods of May are only one part of Creation his praise of them also involves praise of God. It was included by Thomas Parry in his Oxford Book of Welsh Verse.

== Date ==
Dafydd's mention in "May" of "florins of the tree-tops" in connection with "fleur-de-lys riches" has been the basis of an attempt to date the poem. Florins, featuring fleurs-de-lys in their design, were only minted in medieval England between January and August 1344, after which the mintage was discontinued. It was argued by D. Stephen Jones that this showed Dafydd's poem to have been written in or after 1344. Rachel Bromwich pointed out, however, that florins on which fleurs-de-lys figured had been minted in Florence since 1252, and were so widely current across Europe that they have been called "the standard gold coin of the Middle Ages". References to florins in the works of Chaucer and other poets of his time are normally to the Italian coin. She therefore rejected the argument. Dafydd Johnston has since advanced evidence in favour of Jones's theory, citing the line after Dafydd's mention of the florin, "He guarded me secure from treachery", as a possible oblique reference to Luke 4:30: "But he passing through the midst of them, went his way", a verse which was often used as a charm to ward off evil and which was inscribed in Latin on the obverse of the English florin.

== Recensions ==
Three different recensions of the poem exist, represented by Cardiff Central Library MS 4.330 (Hafod 26), a collection of most of Dafydd ap Gwilym's poems (along with some by other poets) made in the Conwy Valley about 1574 by the lexicographer Thomas Wiliems; Bodleian MS Welsh e 1, a collection copied some time between 1612 and 1623 by Ifan Siôn, Huw Machno and one unidentified other, probably for Owen Wynn of Gwydir; and National Library of Wales MS 5274D, an early 17th-century collection. There are not many differences between these three, but one is important: NLW MS 5274D includes two couplets not found in the others.

== Poetic technique ==
"May" displays an impressive command of verse technique. The second line of each rhyming couplet ends with the word Mai, thus maintaining a monorhyme through the entire 52-line poem. This feat is paralleled in only one other cywydd by Dafydd, "Summer", though the Welsh court poets of a slightly earlier date used monorhyme in their awdlau. The metrical rules of the cywydd form demand that the final -ai syllable of the rhyme-word be unstressed, the consequence of which is that in almost every case this word is a verb in the imperfect tense, giving the poem, according to one critic, "a sense of reflection and longing". Dafydd further restricts his choices by starting each of the first eight lines with the letter D, yet the difficulties he sets himself result in no strain in the expression of his thoughts.

Dafydd makes much use of ambiguity in this poem, both in his vocabulary and in his syntax. One clear example of this is his repeated use of the word mwyn, meaning "gentle", tender", "noble", but also "riches", "wealth", "ore", which he uses to reinforce the money imagery of the poem. Hazel leaves, for example, he describes as "florins of the tree-tops" – one of many usages in his poems of foreign words intended to jolt the reader by their unexpectedness. Dafydd uses this money imagery to present the month of May as a wealthy and generous young lord, whom he describes in terms borrowed from older Welsh praise-poetry addressed to the poets' noble patrons.

== Sources and analogues ==
"May" is a work which exhibits connections with other medieval Celtic poetry. As with Dafydd's poem, Summer is personified as a patron of Nature in an Irish poem, "Cétamon", or "May Day", found in The Boyhood Deeds of Fionn. A Welsh triad believed to have circulated orally tells us of "Three things that gladden a lover: a loyal love-messenger, a faithful sweetheart, and a long day, the woodland dark". Cf. lines 27–28 from "May": "Green is the hillside, joyous the love-messenger, long is the day in the leafy woods of May." In more general ways Dafydd's poem recalls the Maytime carols which, it is known, circulated after Dafydd's time, and which may well have been in existence in his day as well; also the praises of nature in early Welsh gnomic and proverbial englynion.

== Connections with other poems by Dafydd ==
The poem strongly connects the idea of love with all the natural phenomena of summer, as do his cywyddau "Summer", "In Praise of Summer", and "May and November". In the last two of those poems May and Summer are personified – as a strong horseman in "May and November", and as a fair forester in "In Praise of Summer" – just as Dafydd portrays May as a free and generous nobleman in this poem. He delights in describing birds, particularly in evoking their abundance in summer, as in this poem, "May and November", and "The Magpie's Advice". Dafydd uses coins as metaphors not just here but in his "The Owl", "The Star", "A Moonlit Night", and "The Elegy for Madog Benfras".

== Editions ==
- Williams, Ifor; Roberts, Thomas, eds. (1935) [1914]. Cywyddau Dafydd ap Gwilym a'i Gyfoeswyr. Caerdydd: Gwasg Prifysgol Cymru. pp. 82–84.
- Parry, Thomas, ed. (1952). Gwaith Dafydd ap Gwilym. Caerdydd: Gwasg Prifysgol Cymru. pp. 67–69.
- Parry, Thomas, ed. (1962). The Oxford Book of Welsh Verse. Oxford: Oxford University Press. pp. 58–60. ISBN 9780198121299.
- Johnston, Dafydd, ed. (2007). "32 - Mis Mai". Dafydd ap Gwilym.net. Welsh Department, Swansea University.

== Translations and paraphrases ==
- Bromwich, Rachel, ed. (1982). Dafydd ap Gwilym: A Selection of Poems. Llandysul: Gomer Press. pp. 4, 6. ISBN 0850888158. With the Middle Welsh original in parallel text.
- Clancy, Joseph P. (2016). The Poems of Dafydd ap Gwilym. Bath: Brown Dog. pp. 111–112. ISBN 9781785450891.
- Ford, Patrick K., ed. (1999). The Celtic Poets: Songs and Tales from Early Ireland and Wales. Belmont, MA: Ford & Bailie. pp. 265–267. ISBN 9780926689053.
- Gurney, Robert, ed. (1969). Bardic Heritage. London: Chatto & Windus. pp. 85–86.
- [Johnes, Arthur James] (1834). Translations into English Verse from the Poems of Davyth ap Gwilym. London: Henry Hooper. pp. 28–30.
- Johnston, Dafydd (2007). "32 - Mis Mai". Dafydd ap Gwilym.net. Welsh Department, Swansea University. With the Middle Welsh original in parallel text.
- Loomis, Richard Morgan, ed. (1982). Dafydd ap Gwilym: The Poems. Binghamton: Center for Medieval & Early Renaissance Studies. pp. 89–90. ISBN 0866980156.

- Rev. repr. in Loomis, Richard; Johnston, Dafydd (1992). Medieval Welsh Poems. Binghamton: Medieval & Renaissance Texts & Studies. pp. 82–83. ISBN 0866981020.

- Sims-Williams, Patrick (1983). "Dafydd ap Gwilym (Mid Fourteenth Century)". In Ford, Boris (ed.). Medieval Literature: The European Inheritance. The New Pelican History of English Literature, 1 (Part 2). Harmondsworth: Penguin. pp. 541–542. ISBN 9780140222722.
- Thomas, Gwyn, ed. (2001). Dafydd ap Gwilym: His Poems. Cardiff: University of Wales Press. pp. 51–52. ISBN 0708316646.
- Watson, Giles (2014). Dafydd ap Gwilym: Paraphrases and Palimpsests. npp. pp. 153–154. ISBN 9781291866803.
