= Gruffudd Gryg =

Gruffudd Gryg (fl. c.1340–1380) was a Welsh poet from Anglesey, North Wales.

A number of Gruffudd's poems have survived including poems to a wave during his pilgrimage to Santiago de Compostela and to an April moon. Also extant are the debate poems between Gruffudd and his contemporary poet and friend Dafydd ap Gwilym. He also composed an elegy for Dafydd ap Gwilym and a poem addressed to the yew above his grave.

== See also ==
- Gruffudd Gryg at Wikisource
