= Bassaleg =

Village near Newport in South Wales

Coordinates: 51.57805°N 3.05053°W

Bassaleg (Welsh: Basaleg) is a village on the west side of Newport, Wales. It is in the Graig electoral ward and community.

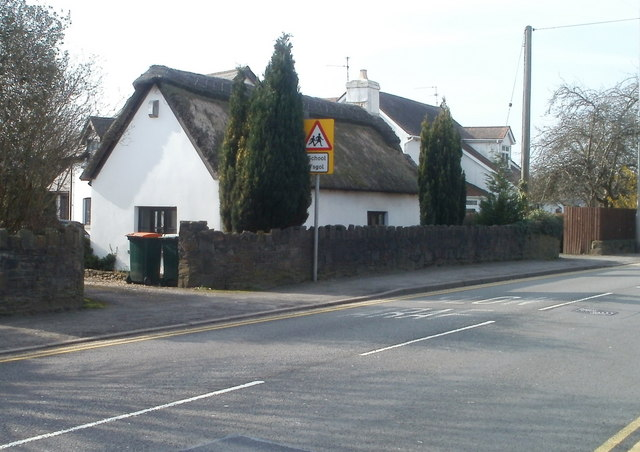
Thatched cottage, Bassaleg

Bassaleg is located 2 miles (3.2 km) northwest of Newport city centre. It is bounded by the A467 road (A4072) to the east, the railway spur to Lower Machen (the former Brecon and Merthyr Tydfil Junction Railway) to the north, the St Mellons Road (B4288) to the south and Rhiwderin to the east. The Ebbw River runs through the area. The A468 road passes through towards Caerphilly and junction 28 of the M4 motorway is less than a mile to the south.

== St Basil's Church ==
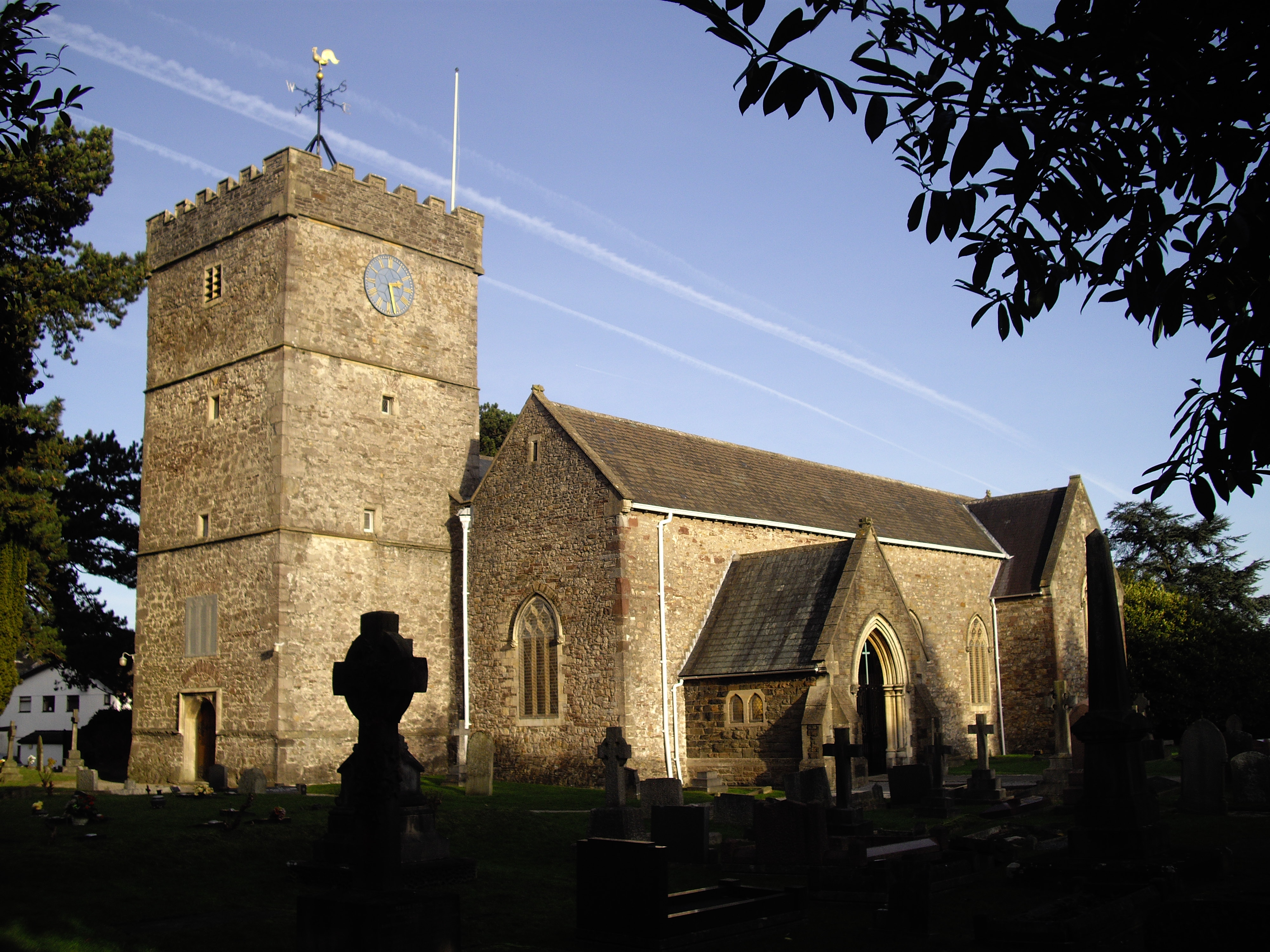
St Basil's parish church

The parish church of St Basil's is a Grade II* listed building.

It has been suggested that the site of the church was originally dedicated to Saint Gwladys. Historians have suggested that Bassaleg is the only British place whose name derives from the word basilica, a term used in early Christianity for a church containing the body of a saint. Until the mid-19th century, a grave chapel for St. Gwladys survived close to the church. The church is part of the Rectorial Benefice of Bassaleg.

== Communications ==
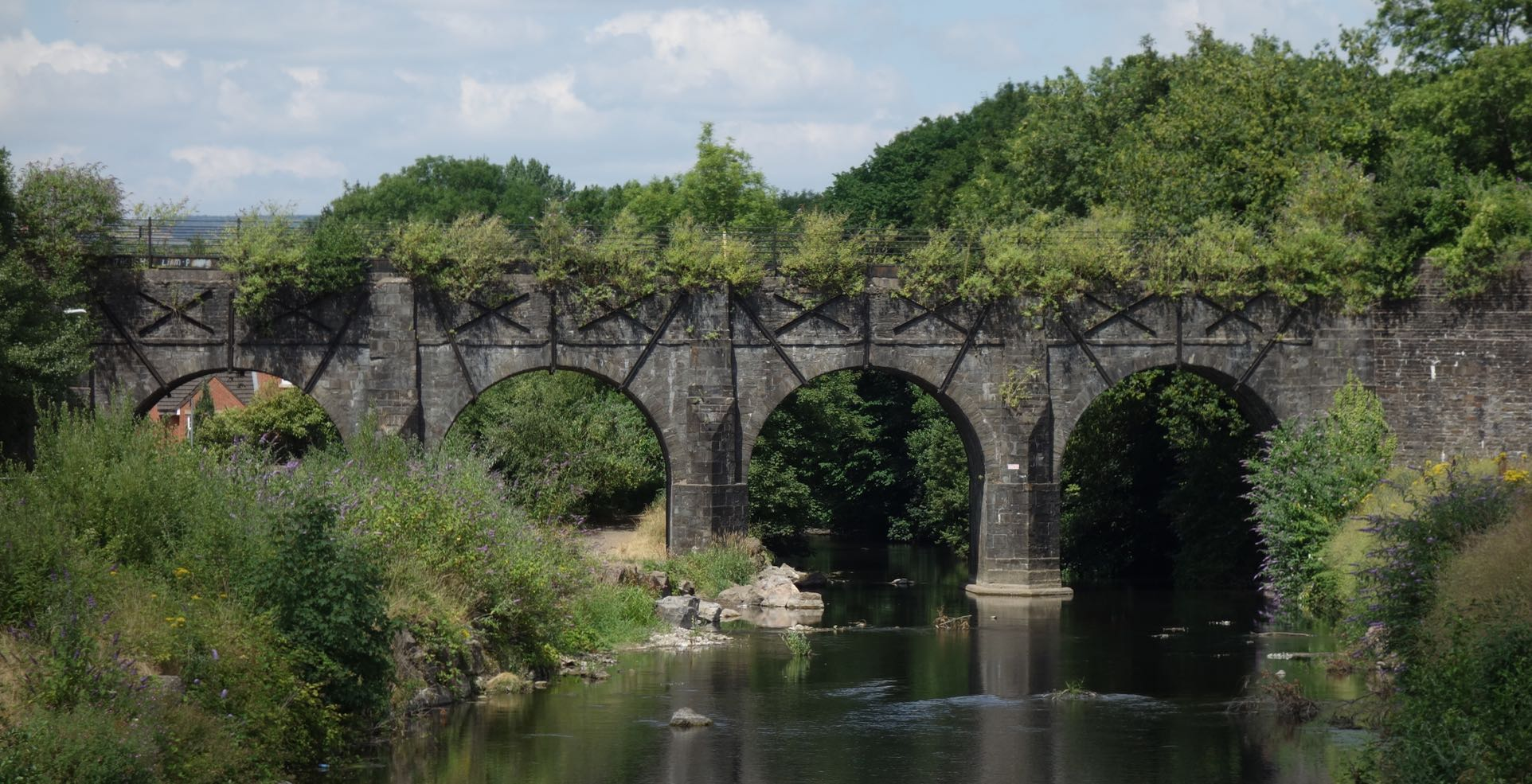
Bassaleg Viaduct

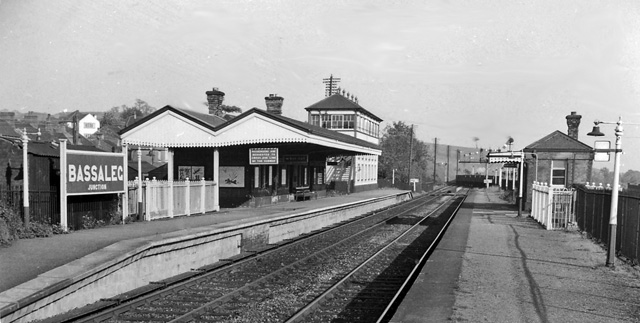
Bassaleg Junction railway station in 1962

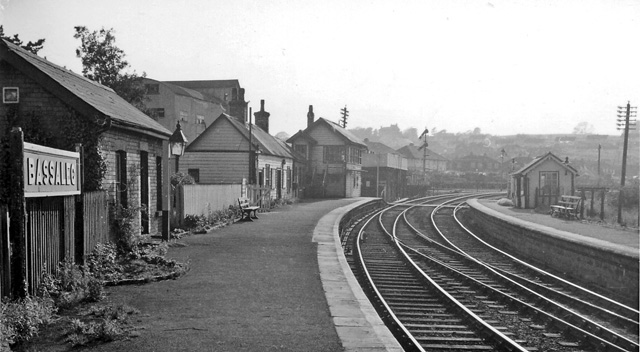
Bassaleg Station in 1962

Bassaleg lies near the junction of the Brecon and Merthyr Railway and Great Western Railway and used to have two stations (Bassaleg and Bassaleg Junction). Both were victims of the Beeching Axe in the 1960s. Pye Corner station, built close to the site of Bassaleg Junction station on the former GWR line, opened on 14 December 2014. Served by the existing Ebbw Valley Railway service between Cardiff Central and Ebbw Vale Town, the station is operated by Transport for Wales. Trains run hourly Monday-Saturday and 2-hourly on Sundays. The journey time to Cardiff Central is 19–22 minutes, and is around 38 minutes to Ebbw Vale Town.

=== Bassaleg Viaduct ===
Bassaleg Viaduct is thought to be the world's oldest operational railway viaduct, having been built over the Ebbw River for the Rumney Railway in 1826. The older Skerne Bridge, in Darlington, County Durham, which opened in 1825 is known to be the world's oldest operational railway bridge. It is Grade II* listed.,

== Schools ==
Bassaleg School is a notable local educational institution, known for its sporting and academic prowess. Former students include:

- Ryan Jones and Aaron Wainwright, current Wales and Lions rugby players
- Alix Popham, former Wales and Lions rugby player
- Stuart Barnes, former England and Lions rugby player and current Sky Sports rugby commentator
- Stephen Jones, current rugby correspondent for The Sunday Times
- John Davies, former Archbishop of Wales

== History ==
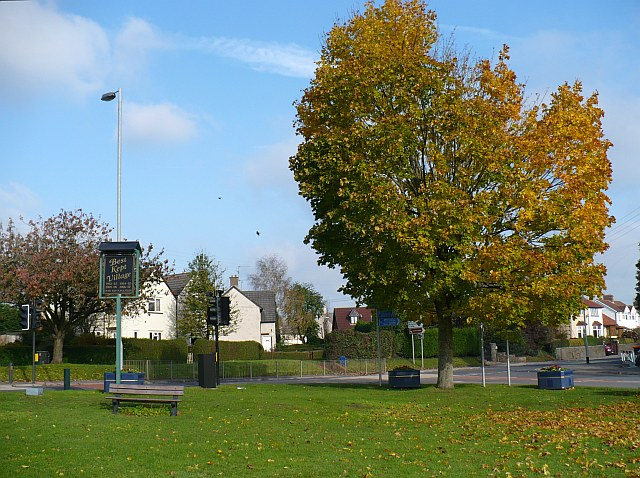
Best kept village sign, Bassaleg

Bassaleg's earliest known inhabitant is Saint Gwladys, a hermit and wife of St. Gwynllyw or Woolos, who founded her own hermitage at Pencarnu, supposedly at a site at Pont Ebbw. While there she bathed in the Ebbw River and the Lady's Well at Tredegar may have been dedicated to her. It has been suggested that site of St. Basil's church was originally dedicated to her. In the 14th century (fl. c. 1320 - 1360/1380), a Welsh lord, Ifor Hael (real name, Ifor ap Llywelyn) lived in Gwernyclepa manor near Bassaleg. He was a well known promoter of poetry, and he was a friend to the famous Welsh bard, Dafydd ap Gwilym. There have been many poems written about him, and for the sadness of the state of his manor now. One such is an englyn, written by 18th-century poet Evan Evans (Ieuan Fardd):

Llys Ifor hael, gwael yw'r gwedd,––yn garnau
mewn gwerni mae'n gorwedd;
drain ac ysgall mall a'i medd,
mieri lle bu mawredd.

The hall of Ivor the generous, poor it looks, a cairn,
it lies amongst alders
Thorns and the blight of the thistle own it
Briars, where once there was greatness

The englyn is a part of a longer poem, which was traditionally sung.

The most important local influence was the local estate of the Morgans, Lords Tredegar, at Tredegar House many of whom are buried in the churchyard.

During the Newport Rising of 1839 the Chartist marchers passed through this area heading into Newport.

In November 2020, a Second World War bomb was found in a house in Bassaleg. Properties within 100 metres were evacuated until the bomb was removed from the house.
