= Ifor Hael =

14th-century Welsh nobleman, patron of Dafydd ap Gwilym

Ifor ap Llywelyn, better known as Ifor Hael (Ifor the Generous) (fl. c. 1320 – 1360/1380), was a nobleman from Gwent in south Wales. He was a friend and the primary patron of the famous poet Dafydd ap Gwilym. He came to represent the ideal of patronage in the eyes of the Poets of the Nobility (Beirdd yr Uchelwyr) and subsequent Welsh poets. The epithet Hael (Generous) is a deliberate echo of the 'Three Generous Men' (Tri Hael) found in the texts of the Triads of the Island of Britain.

== History ==
We have few firm facts about him. His lineage is preserved as Ifor ap Llywelyn ab Ifor ap Bledri ap Cadifor Fawr, lord of Blaen-cuch in Dyfed. His father, Llywelyn, married Angharad, daughter of Morgan ap Maredudd of Tredegar near Newport – a descendant of Rhys ap Tewdwr – and moved to live in Gwent when his wife inherited Morgan's lands. References in two documents show that Angharad was born either in 1293 or 1299, suggesting that Ifor was born around 1315–20. Ifor lived in the mansion of Gwernyclepa near Bassaleg in Gwent, about a mile south of the current village, where he kept a warm welcome on his hearth for the poets. There are several references to the court of Ifor Hael in the poetry of Dafydd ap Gwilym. It is believed that the poet sang for him during the period 1345–80. One of his poems is a cywydd of praise to Ifor's court in Bassaleg, which includes the lines:

Great honour has come to me;
I shall have, if I live,
Hunting with hounds—no lord is more generous—
And drinking with Ifor,
And shooting stags on a straight path,
And casting falcons into sky and wind,
And songs of fair tongues,
And solace in Bassaleg.

Among Dafydd ap Gwilym's finest poems are his elegies to Ifor and his wife Nest together, and to Angharad. Here is the opening englyn of his elegy to Ifor and Nest:

Clumsy old age and longing, — and pain
And penance like the tip of an arrow,
Ifor is dead, there is no superiority,
Nest is dead, Wales is the worse for it.

== Legacy ==
In the 18th and 19th centuries, 'The Court of Ifor Hael' (Llys Ifor Hael) became a popular subject for poets, usually as a melancholic meditation over the ruins as a symbol of the fleeting nature of life and past glory. One of the best-known works of Evan Evans (Ieuan Fardd), for example, is the chain of englynion Llys Ifor Hael, which was composed when he visited the ruins of Ifor ap Llywelyn's court in Bassaleg in 1779 in the company of Iolo Morganwg. Several other poets sang on the subject, including Ieuan Glan Geirionydd.

== Ifor Hael School ==
In 2008, the second Welsh-medium primary school in the city of Newport was opened and named Ysgol Ifor Hael in honour of the medieval patron. The school was officially opened in July 2009.
