= Dafydd ap Gwilym =

14th-century Welsh poet

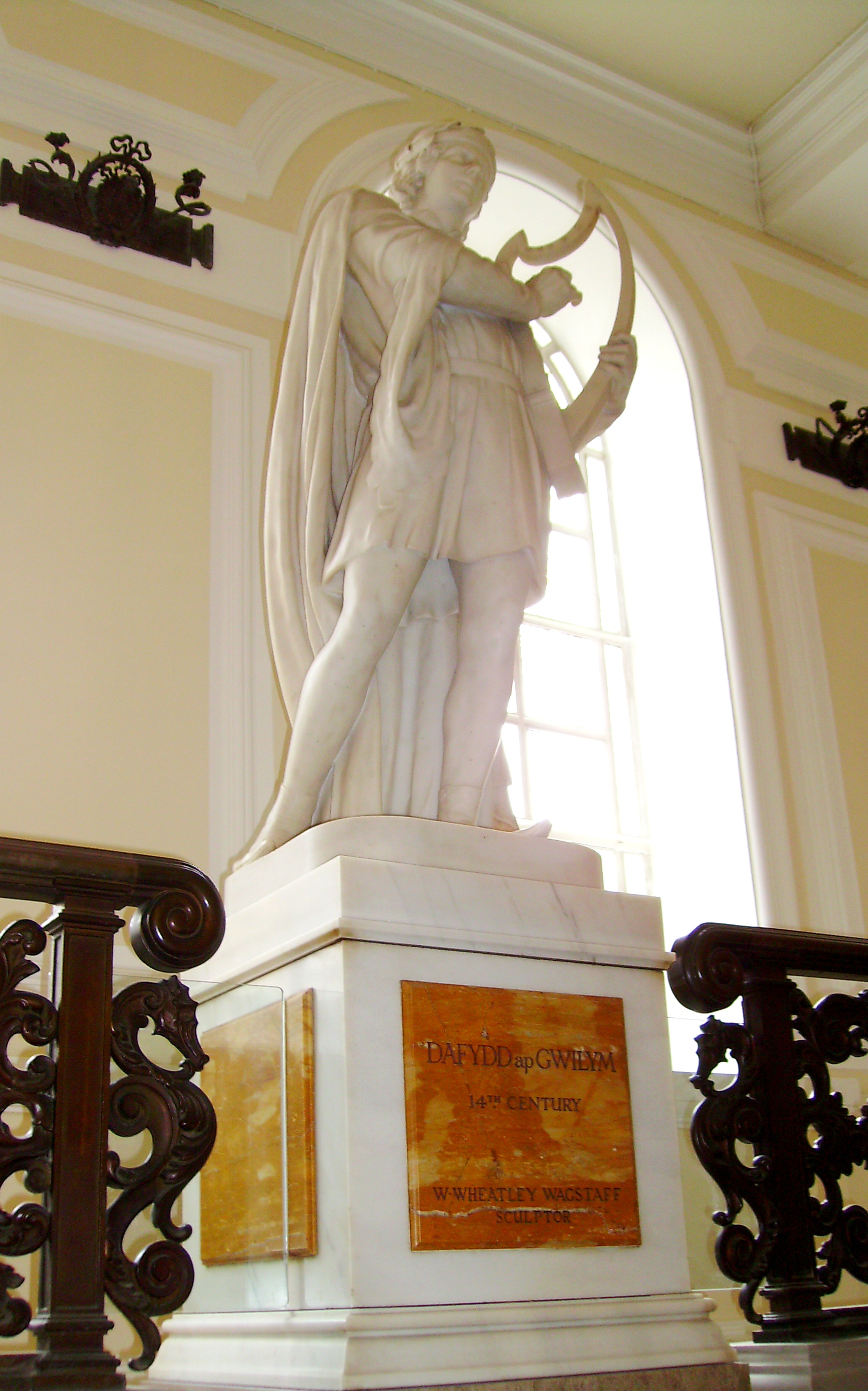
- Sculpture of Dafydd ap Gwilym by W Wheatley Wagstaff at City Hall, Cardiff
- Born: Wales
- Occupation: Poet
- Writing career
- Period: c. 1340–1352
- Genres: Love poetry, erotica
- Notable works: Trafferth mewn Tafarn, Y Rhugl Groen, Merched Llanbadarn, Morfudd fel yr Haul, Cywydd y gal
- Website: dafyddapgwilym.net

Dafydd ap Gwilym (c. 1315/1320 – c. 1352) is regarded as one of the leading Welsh poets and among the great poets of Europe in the Middle Ages. Dafydd's poetry also offers a window into the cultural practices of the period and preservation of culture in the face of occupation.

== Life ==
Map of some cities and towns in Wales.

Tradition has it that Dafydd was born at Brogynin, near Penrhyn-coch (at the time in Llanbadarn Fawr parish), Ceredigion, 6 or 7 miles from Aberystwyth. Although he does not mention Brogynin in his poems, in his poem Taith i Garu (Journey for Love) he mentions a number of places which are close by, showing that he was familiar with the region. He also mentions going to church in Llanbadarn Fawr in the poem Girls of Llanbadarn.

His father, Gwilym Gam, and mother, Ardudfyl, were both from noble families. As one of noble birth it seems Dafydd did not belong to the guild of professional poets in medieval Wales.

R. Geraint Gruffydd suggests c. 1315-c. 1350 as the poet's dates, and suggested that he might have died in the outbreak of the Black Death in 1349-50; others place him a little later, from c. 1320–40 to c. 1370–80. Occasional indications of a date are found in the poems themselves, mostly from the 1340s. The earliest of these is the mention of "Turel" in the poem Cusan, which might refer to Hugh Tyrrell, a Marcher lord, dating the poem to before his death in 1343. It appears that Dafydd spent some time at the home of his maternal uncle Llywelyn ap Gwilym, who held the office of Constable of Newcastle Emlyn (situated in Carmarthenshire between Cardigan and Carmarthen) from 1340 to 1346. He wrote a eulogy for him while he was alive and an elegy after his death in 1346. Another date is the mention of Calais in the poem Caer Rhag Cenfigen (A Fortress Against Envy), which is thought to be a reference to the Siege of Calais by Edward III in 1347. The last date that has been suggested is in the poem Rhagoriaeth y Bardd ar Arall (The Poet's Superiority or The Rival), in which Dafydd mentions a prisoner awaiting execution by the Pope; this is thought by some to be a reference to the Italian politician Cola di Rienzo or Rienzi, who was in prison in Avignon awaiting execution in late 1352; though others see the reference as insufficiently precise to be certain. There is no evidence of any later date in the poems. The poem The Clock, which describes a mechanical clock of a type not found in Britain until 1370, is sometimes cited, but on other grounds is probably not by Dafydd.

It has been speculated that Dafydd may have begun his education in Strata Florida Abbey in Carmarthenshire 16 miles south west of Aberystwyth, although there is no direct evidence for this.

It seems likely that he was encouraged to write poetry by his uncle Llywelyn ap Gwilym in Newcastle Emlyn, whom he calls cerddwriaeth ddoethineb "wisdom of the art of poetry" and llyfr dwned Dyfed "Dyfed's grammar book" and says of him Ys difai y'm dysgud "faultlessly you taught me".

Perhaps it was at this period that Dafydd visited the nobleman Ieuan ap Gruffudd ap Llywelyn, whose estate is believed to have been at Tywyn (Y Ferwig) near Cardigan about 13 miles north west of Newcastle Emlyn. It was here he met Dyddgu, Ieuan's daughter, to whom he addressed several love poems.

It was probably at this time that he also visited Carmarthen, 17 miles south of Newcastle Emlyn, and was inspired to write a devotional poem praising the rood cross in the church.

Later, Dafydd was befriended by the family of Ieuan Llwyd ab Ieuan ap Gruffudd Foel of Glyn Aeron (near Llangeitho about 17 miles south of Aberystwyth). Dafydd wrote two courtly love poems, one dated by a mention of Calais to 1347, and an elegy for Ieuan's wife Angharad as well as a false elegy for Ieuan's son Rhydderch. Ieuan Llwyd had in his possession the Hendregadredd Manuscript (originally begun in Strata Florida Abbey), into which various visiting poets wrote their work. In addition to the Elegy for Angharad and the Elegy for Rhydderch, it contains Dafydd's poem In Praise of the Rood of Carmarthen, written possibly in his own hand. An anonymous poem, possibly by Dafydd, lamenting the loss of his hair, was written on a leaf which is thought to have been part of this same manuscript but which got separated from it. Ieuan and Angharad's son, Rhydderch, also kept a famous manuscript book, called the White Book of Rhydderch, which contained the Mabinogion and other works. Among these is a short poem Englynion y Cusan, which may be by Dafydd. Apart from these four poems none of Dafydd's works are found in any manuscript for another 100 years, and it seems that during this period they were transmitted along with their music by being memorised by other bards, resulting in frequent variations in line order and in wording.

Three men connected with Dafydd ap Gwilym are mentioned in a legal document of 1344 from Aberystwyth. A certain Howel ap Gronow was required to pay a fine for stealing two silver cups from Robert le Northern, a bailiff of Aberystwyth. This Robert le Northern is believed to be the same man as Robin Nordd, the husband of Elen whom Dafydd calls one of his four great loves. Two men offered surety for Howel's fine: one was Ieuan Llwyd son of Ieuan Fwyaf, constable of Genau'r Glyn commote, just north of Aberystwyth, for whom Dafydd wrote a praise poem, describing him as his tadmaeth ("foster-father"); and the other was a certain "Ebowa Baghan", who is thought to be the same as the man in Dafydd calls y Bwa Bach ("the Little Bow"), a merchant of Aberystwyth, to whom Dafydd's beloved Morfudd was married.

If Dafydd's poem Y Gwynt (The Wind) can be trusted, it appears that Y Bwa Bach had made a legal complaint against Dafydd and had him banned from the district. This legal action is referred to again in Y Gal ("The Penis"), in which he rebukes his penis for getting him into trouble.

Another important patron with whom Dafydd spent time was Ifor ap Llywelyn, known to later generations as Ifor Hael, of Bassaleg near Newport in Gwent. Dafydd composed a number of poems in his honour. In one of those poems Dafydd mentions a forthcoming visit to Gwynedd, but whether he made the visit is uncertain, since in another poem he refuses to go. It was once suggested that these poems were written not by Dafydd but by another, unknown poet; but they are now accepted as Dafydd's own work. Dafydd stayed with Ifor after he was banned from his home district, since in the poem Basaleg he writes the words i'm gwlad ni'm gadwyd ("I am not allowed (to go) to my own country"), before going on to praise the hospitality he has received from Ifor.

Dafydd travelled at least once to Bangor in Gwynedd, close to Anglesey, and to Newborough in Anglesey. He wrote a praise poem in honour of Newborough, as well as an anecdote of his failure to pick up a girl there, and a praise poem for Hywel, Dean of Bangor Cathedral, who was his host in Bangor. In another poem (Gwayw Serch) he mentions falling in love with a girl he spotted in Bangor cathedral. It was possibly on his return from this visit that he wrote Y Don ar Afon Dyfi (The Wave on the River Dyfi), complaining that the river was delaying him from getting back to Morfudd. Dafydd states that he was in Anglesey when he wrote his eulogy for Ieuan Llwyd son of Ieuan Fwyaf. It would appear that the anonymous woman whom he claimed as his fourth great love came from Gwynedd.

There are two rival traditions about Dafydd's burial place. One tradition, based on a poem by Gruffudd Gryg addressing a yew tree above Dafydd's grave at Strata Florida, says that he was buried within the precinct of the Cistercian Strata Florida Abbey, Ceredigion. However, according another tradition dating to about 1600 claims that the burial took place in the churchyard of Talley Abbey, about 27 miles to the south of Strata Florida. On 15 September 1984 a memorial stone was unveiled by a Prifardd to mark the site at Talley.

While it may be difficult to trace the exact years Dafydd was active, it is clear he wrote after Edward I's conquest of Wales in 1282-3. Despite living under English authority, Dafydd's poetry presents ways in which Welsh culture continued to distinguish itself and prevail.

== Themes in Dafydd's poetry ==
It is believed that about one hundred and fifty of Dafydd's poems have survived, though many others have been attributed to him over the centuries. His main themes were love and nature. Some of his poems (such as those to Angharad) display the influence of wider European ideas of courtly love, as exemplified in the troubadour poetry of Provençal. While courtly love is primarily associated with the literature of mainland Europe, its elements can be found in works across the British Isles. Elements of courtly love have been noted in Welsh literature well before Dafydd's active days, suggesting that courtly love grew as a culturally connected phenomenon across European literature. However, many of his love poems seem to express personal feelings and experiences, albeit often with considerable exaggeration. Others are comic anecdotes following the tradition of the French fabliau.

Dafydd's poetry reflected the individuality of his own personal as well as Welsh cultural expression through his unique expression of common literary practices, as well as his individual voice in his poetry. One aspect that differed from conventional poetry in Dafydd's works was the use of himself as the subject. Traditional contemporary poetry traditionally kept the poet far removed from the scene. Dafydd's work, in contrast, is full of his own feelings and experiences, and he is a key figure in this transition from a primarily social poetic tradition into one in which the poet's own vision and art is given precedence. Dafydd's poetry was also unique in its expressions of religion and nature. In “Praise of Summer”, Dafydd praises both the divine and the changing of summer as connected and benevolent. Reference to the divine in prior and contemporary literature usually depicted strong themes of judgement and virtue. With Dafydd's poetry, we see these forces as a gift worth celebrating.

Dafydd's poetry also differs from the conventions of other love poetry in its use of sexual metaphor. Some of Dafydd's poems, such as “A Poem in Praise of the Penis”, display explicit connection to sexual desire. Yet, Dafydd was also well adept at keeping his metaphors subtle. In “The Lady Goldsmith,” Dafydd praises his devotion to a woman who creates attire out of her hair and nature's bristle. In the poem, the woman crafts a belt for Dafydd. In this poem, the metaphor of sexual desire is drawn from the proximity of the woman's hair to Dafydd's waist. The belt itself stands as the sexual connection between this woman and Dafydd. In contrast, traditional courtly love literature tended to shy away from praising sexual desire in favour of patience and virtuous romance.

He was an innovative poet who was responsible for popularising the metre known as the cywydd and first to use it for praise. Dafydd also has been credited for popularising the exacting rules of alliteration and rhyme known as cynghanedd. The continued use of cynghanedd and cywydd by Welsh poets after Dafydd's active years is a testament to the effect Dafydd had on shaping Welsh literary culture. Dafydd's poetry provided a framework for which Welsh literary culture could grow its own unique traditions.

Although Dafydd wrote comparatively conventional praise poetry, he mainly wrote love poetry and poetry expressing a personal wonderment at nature; Dafydd's poetry on the latter subject in particular is largely without precedent in Welsh or European literature in terms of its depth and complexity. His popularity during his own historic period is testified by the fact that so many of his poems were selected for preservation in texts, despite a relatively short career compared to some of his contemporaries.

=== Love poetry ===
==== Love and nature ====
Dafydd is famous for his love poetry and for his descriptions of nature. Often these two themes are combined in the same poem. His best-known works include the following poems:

- Mis Mai (May), a celebration of the coming of summer, love's season. In the poem Dafydd describes how he was welcomed by a girl in the woods "under May's chancel". She is not named by she may be Morfudd (compare Taith i Garu, where he describes once making love to Morfudd in a birch grove, and Offeren y Llwyn, where the birdsong is compared to a religious service). All 27 couplets of the poem end in the word Mai, with the rhyme -ai in every verse.
- Yr Haf (Summer). Dafydd describes the beauty of the summer, and looks forward to making love to a girl under the trees. But Eiddig (the Jealous Husband) likes only winter. In the last section, however, Dafydd grows fearful that the summer will soon give way to autumn and he will be asking "Where's the summer?" Like Mis Mai, this poem has the same rhyme throughout, since every couplet ends in the word haf "summer". In addition, in most (but not all) couplets there is cymeriad llythrennol, in that the first consonants of the two lines match.
- Y Deildy (The House of Leaves). With vivid imagery, Dafydd describes a beautiful house of leaves which the month of May and the various song-birds have built for him in the woods. Here a beautiful girl once welcomed him, and he anticipates hopefully that she may come to him there again. At the end he mentions an old witch he had to bribe and a house where he suffered violence. The girl's name is not mentioned but she may be Morfudd, judging from parallels with other poems such as Taith i Garu, in which he describes once making love to Morfudd in the woods. It appears from Tri Phorthor Eiddig (Three Gatekeepers of the Jealous One) that the old witch is the servant who informs the girl's husband that Dafydd is trying to enter his house.
- Y Niwl (The Mist). Dafydd receives a message from his girlfriend agreeing to meet him in the woods. He sets out joyfully early in the morning, but soon finds himself lost in a thick mist on the moor, and has to give up the journey. A large part of the poem describes the mist using a series of dyfalu ("images" or "metaphors"). The editor Dafydd Johnston writes: "The extended passage of dyfalu describing the mist contains various sinister metaphors such as military garments, the spider's web, and the breath of a bear baited by dogs, and it is suggested that the mist comes from Annwfn, the underworld of Celtic mythology."

==== Conversations with birds ====
In several poems Dafydd imagines himself having a conversation with a bird or asks a bird to carry a love-message for him:

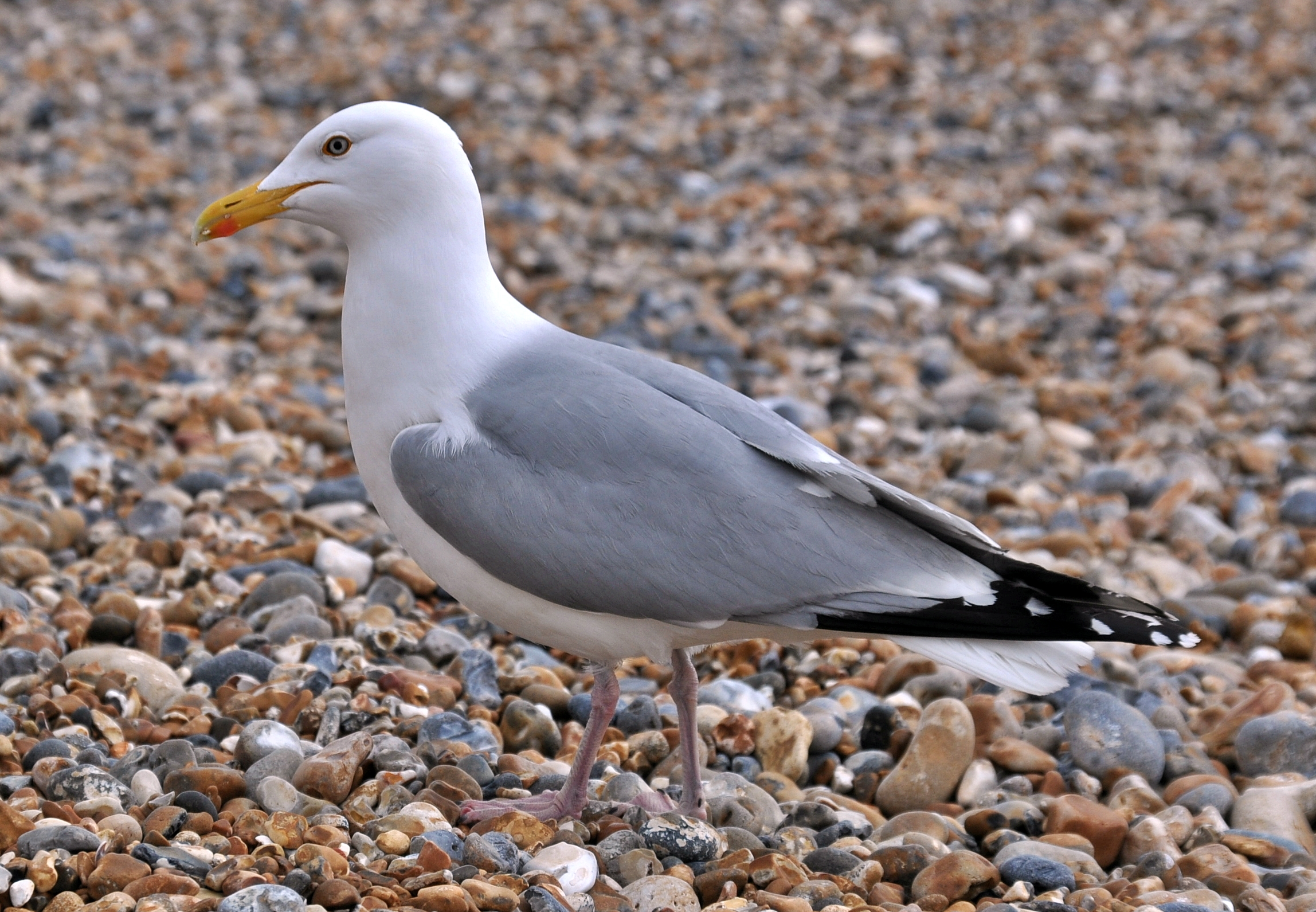
A herring gull

- Yr Wylan (The Seagull). Dafydd describes the beauty of a seagull and asks it to carry a message to his love. The anonymous girl lives in a castle by the sea, and appears not be Morfudd, since she has copper-coloured hair.
- Yr Ehedydd (The Skylark). Dafydd describes the beauty of a skylark and its voice. He asks it to take a message from him to a certain woman in Gwynedd and to bring back some kisses for him. He advises it to fly high and not to fear the arrows of the jealous husband.
- Ymddiddan â'r Cyffylog (Conversation with the Woodcock) Dafydd asks a woodcock where it is going; the woodcock says it is fleeing from the winter weather. Dafydd encourages the bird to take shelter where his girlfriend is; but if a hunter approaches, it is to fly away and lead the hunter far away through the woods. He asks the bird to report to him if the girl is unfaithful. The woodcock tells him it is too late, and she has another man. Dafydd rues his ill luck.
- Cyngor y Bioden (The Magpie's Advice) Dafydd is in a delightful wood at the beginning of April, composing a song about a girl. Among the various songbirds there is a magpie, who tells him that he is wasting his time and that he would be better off indoors by the fire. Dafydd asks the magpie for advice. The magpie tells him that he is a foolish man and that the girl does not love him. Dafydd is angry and vows to punish the bird.

==== Poems of misadventure ====
Many of Dafydd's poems humorously describe his unsuccessful attempts to seduce women. Here are some:

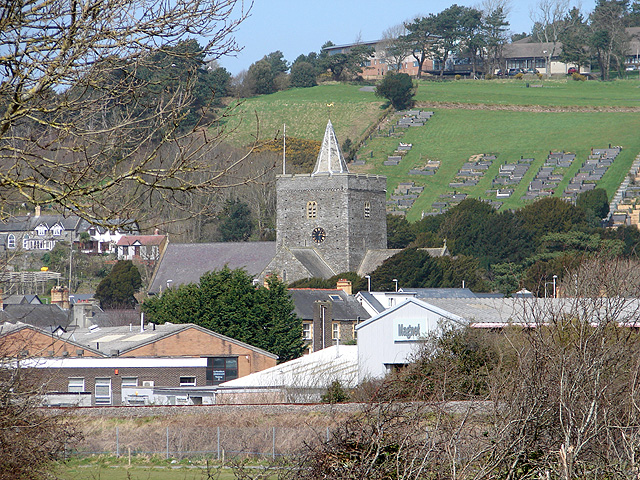
Llanbadarn Fawr church

- Merched Llanbadarn (The Girls of Llanbadarn), in which he speaks of going to church on Sunday in order to ogle the local girls, but fails to impress them. The metre is unusually simple, and 43% of the lines have no cynghanedd. (Llanbadarn church, dedicated to St Padarn, is on the eastern outskirts of modern Aberystwyth.)
- Trafferth mewn Tafarn (Trouble at a Tavern), in which Dafydd comically recounts the difficulties he faces trying to meet his lover in a tavern but by knocking over a table in the dark only succeeds in waking everybody up.
- Sarhau ei Was (Insulting his Servant). Another comic poem. At the fair on St Peter's Day in the town of Newborough, Anglesey, Dafydd spots an attractive young woman. Later that evening he sends his servant to her with a gift of wine, but the girl indignantly pours the wine over the servant's head. Dafydd ends the poem by cursing the girl.
- Y Rhugl Groen (The Rattle Bag), in which Dafydd's open-air intercourse with a girl is cruelly interrupted by a shepherd with a rattle bag. (The rhugl groen was an instrument used to create noise to keep birds and animals away from agricultural land. It was a leather pouch filled with pebbles and placed on top of a long stick, which would be shaken to create a sound).
- Y Llwynog (The Fox). While waiting to meet a girl in a wood, Dafydd is disturbed by a fox. He aims an arrow at it, but misses and his bow breaks. The second half of the poem is a vivid half-admiring description of the fox, ending with the line "a leopard with a dart in its backside".
- Y Cyffylog (The Woodcock). Dafydd describes the tribulations of waiting for a girl on a frosty night (which he contrasts with the woods in May). He was making love to a girl when suddenly they were disturbed by a woodcock running noisily out of a bush, making them fear it was the girl's husband. He describes the woodcock in unflattering terms and hopes that someone will shoot it with an arrow.

==== Unsuccessful serenades ====
The serenade poem, in which a young man (often drunk) sings of his love outside the door or window of a girl, is a common theme of ancient Greek and Latin literature as well as of medieval European literature. In Dafydd's case the poems are usually comedies in which the lover fails to get his reward.

- Caru yn y Gaeaf (Love in the Winter). One freezing winter's night, drunk from the tavern, Dafydd taps on the window of his beloved's house, but succeeds only in waking her jealous husband, who calls the neighbours and chases Dafydd out of town. He flees to the woods where he once made love to the girl, but finds everything bare and cold. Six couplets are devoted to describing the icicles which drip on his neck as he stands at the window.
- Y Ffenestr (The Window). Dafydd makes his way through a grove to the window of his beloved's bedroom; but she refuses to kiss him. He is reminded of the famous window in Caerlleon through which Melwas stole King Arthur's wife Guinevere; but though he waited for a while in the snow, he got no reward, since the bars of the window were too thick for their lips to touch, even if she had been willing. He curses the window and the man who made it.
- Y Cwt Gwyddau (The Goose Shed). Dafydd reaches his lover's house and has just begun a conversation with her when the furious husband chases him away. Dafydd hides in a shed for geese, where he is viciously attacked by a nine-year-old mother goose. Afterwards his girlfriend commiserates with him and he vows to take vengeance on the goose. – The poem bears a strong resemblance to the fabliaux which were popular in France in the 13th and 14th centuries. As with The Girls of Llanbadarn, there are a large number of lines (36%) without any cynghanedd.
- Tri Phorthor Eiddig (Eiddig's Three Gatekeepers). The first part of the poem describes the three "gatekeepers" of Eiddig (the Jealous Husband): a fierce dog, a creaking door, and an old female servant who has difficulty sleeping. Dafydd then tells how the night before last when he came to the back door of his beloved's house, he was attacked by the dog, which took a bite out of his cloak, then the door made a frightful noise, and finally he could hear the old woman warning the husband. Dafydd retreated and he and the girl shot arrows of love at each other. He consoles himself that at least he has the freedom of the woods and fields, perhaps referring to the situation at this period when Welsh people were often excluded from fortified towns.

The poem Dan y Bargod, described below, is another poem of the same kind.

==== Poems of courtly love ====
- Caer Rhag Cenfigen (A Fortress Against Envy). Dafydd declares that Britons from Roman times have been jealous and obstructive, as they are being to him now, just because he is handsome and talented. But his heart is a fortress which is proof against all the gossips. Developing this metaphor at length he reveals that he is in love with Angharad. He prays to God to protect him from the envious detractors. – It is thought that this Angharad is probably Angharad the wife of the nobleman Ieuan Llwyd of Glyn Aeron. Dafydd wrote a eulogy for her and another for her son Rhydderch (see below). There is evidence that Angharad was a patron of love poetry. The mention of Calais appears to be a reference to Edward III's Siege of Calais, dating the poem to 1347.
- Merch o Is Aeron (A Girl from Is Aeron) Dafydd claims to be suffering from unrequited love for a beautiful girl of Lower Aeron. The girl is not named but there are several indications (for example, the phrase "Ceredigion's gossamer", which recurs in the elegy for Angharad) that the girl in question in this poem too is Angharad, the wife of Ieuan Llwyd of Glyn Aeron. The poem is therefore considered to be typical of the convention of courtly love, in which poets wrote poems courting the wives of their patrons as if they were lovers. It is richly ornamented with alliteration, and the proportion of lines with cynghanedd groes (57%) is higher than in any other of Dafydd's cywyddau.

==== Other poems of love ====
- Gwayw Serch (Love's Spear). In the choir of the cathedral in Bangor in Gwynedd in north Wales, Dafydd spots a beautiful girl and feels a pang of love as though he has been pierced by a sharp spear. The first nine lines describe the girl's beauty; the remaining 25 lines, with reference to various sharp instruments, he describes the pangs he is feeling. It is apparently this poem which Gruffudd Gryg was referring to in the first poem of the satirical debate (see below) when he mocked Dafydd for exaggerating the pangs of love. The poem has been taken as a parody of a theme common in European poetry.
- Y Wawr (The Dawn). Dafydd describes how last night he was in the midst of making love to a girl when suddenly dawn came. The rest of the poem is a dialogue, with the girlfriend telling him to get up and leave quickly, while Dafydd constantly gives excuses. At the end she asks if he will come again and he promises to do so. The poem is usually interpreted as an amusing parody of the dawn-song (aubade) popular in France in the Middle Ages.
- Y Drych (The Mirror) Dafydd looks at his face in a round mirror and is dismayed to see how ugly and ill he looks. He concludes that either he is a bad person or the mirror is false, and he curses it. But if he really is so wrinkly, the cause must be the girl from Gwynedd for whom he is pining.
- Cywydd y Gal (A Poem in Praise of the Penis), in which complains that his penis has often got him into trouble, while at the same time boasting about it. Until recently it was not included in editions of Dafydd's works.
- Cusan (Kissing) Dafydd rejoices in a wonderful day because he has received a kiss. The poem describes the kiss with various metaphors, such as "Carmarthen Castle encircling my lips". If the mention of "Turel" refers to Hugh Tyrrel, a prominent figure who died in 1343, as some editors think, this would place the poem early in Dafydd's career.
- Englynion y Cusan (Verses on the Kiss) This is a short poem describing a kiss and its effects. The poem consists of four stanzas of englyn unodl union and is richly decorated with internal rhyme and alliteration, as well as by cymeriad (matching letters at the beginnings of lines). It is not known for certain if this poem was composed by Dafydd, but it is very possible, since it was copied into a book kept by Rhydderch ab Ieuan Llwyd, for whom Dafydd wrote an elegy.
- Y Bardd a'r Brawd Llwyd (The Poet and the Grey Friar). Dafydd confesses to a friar that he can't stop loving and singing about a certain girl, although she will not love him back. The friar advises him to give up singing sinful cywyddau and say prayers instead. The rest of the poem gives Dafydd's reply, and he argues that it is God's will for men to love women. "All gaiety comes from heaven, and sadness from hell." He therefore refuses to give up singing cywyddau about love. – The poem is written in the simple popular traethodl metre, which is like the usual cywydd deuair hirion but with less strict rules of rhyme and almost no cynghanedd.
- Ei Gysgod (His Shadow). While waiting for a girl under some trees in the rain Dafydd is suddenly startled to see his own shadow. The shadow tells him that it has come to warn him that lust is taking him over. Dafydd disparages the shadow with a series of imaginative insults, and protests that he has never done anything wrong. The shadow replies that if it were to reveal everything it knows, Dafydd would surely be hanged. Dafydd tells the shadow to be quiet and not to dare to reveal anything. – The authenticity of the poem was doubted by Parry (1985) but it is accepted by others as a genuine work, which does not imitate but parodies the theological debates between body and soul current in the period.
- Llw Gau (The False Oath) This poem of 16 lines is the shortest of Dafydd's cywyddau. The first eight lines describe how a certain girl swore an oath that he had not touched her. The second half of the poem, beginning with Do do ("yes we did") and with every line beginning emphatically with ⟨D⟩, protests that they did indeed have sex.
- Erfyn am ei Bywyd (Pleading for his Life). Dafydd addresses a beautiful girl from Anglesey who has apparently made a complaint about him, putting him in danger of being hanged. He begs her to stop her complaint and be reconciled. He admits they had sex, but he is very bitter about it. The mention of St David's and Anglesey in this poem connects it to Pererindod Merch (see below).
- Pererindod Merch (A Girl's Pilgrimage). Dafydd imagines how an unnamed girl, as a penance for killing him, has set off on a pilgrimage from Anglesey to St David's. He lists twelve rivers she will have to cross, starting with the Menai Strait and ending with the River Teifi, and he says a prayer for each one that her passage will be easy. At the end he prays that Mary will forgive her for killing him, and says that he himself will also forgive her.

==== Morfudd ====
The beloved most often mentioned in Dafydd's poems is Morfudd (Welsh pronunciation: ['mɔrvɨð]). She was apparently the wife of an Aberystwyth merchant, whom Dafydd refers to as y Bwa Bach ("the Little Bow") or as Eiddig ("the Jealous One"), and she seems to have had a long affair with Dafydd. There was in fact according to contemporary documents a man called Y Bwa Bychan who acted for the reeve of the commote of Perfedd (where Dafydd's home of Brogynin was situated) in 1339-40, and whose son Maredudd was beadle of the neighbouring commote of Genau’r Glyn in 1357–8. In the poem Morfudd's Hair Dafydd refers to Y Bwa Bach as Cynwrig Cinnin, which may have been his real name. The name Morfudd (or Forfudd) features in 40 poems, including one by Gruffudd Gryg, and it is possible that she appears anonymously in others. Among these poems are the following:

- Y Gwynt (The Wind): In a series of vivid images Dafydd describes the wind and begs it to go to Morfudd's father's house in Uwch Aeron to tell her how wretched he is without her. Uwch Aeron, "Above the Aeron", was the region south of Aberystwyth between the River Ystwyth and River Aeron. According to the editor Dafydd Johnston, lines 17–8 and 49 suggest that Dafydd was exiled from the region as a result of legal action of y Bwa Bach.
- Morfudd fel yr Haul (Morfudd Like the Sun). Dafydd describes Morfudd's beauty and her complexion, comparing it to snow or foam. He admits: "Her deceit and trickery is enormous, worse than anything, and (yet) she is my darling." He compares her to the sun, which shines brightly during the day, but disappears at night, when Morfudd goes to join her husband. Lines 1-14 all start with G, lines 15-6 and 21-26 all start with M.
- Mis Mai a Mis Tachwedd (May and November). Dafydd describes May as like a knight, "conquering every green vale". Dafydd is excited to remember Morfudd at this time. He contrasts May with "the nasty black month" which strips the leaves from the trees and is inimical to lovers. The poem was formerly called Mis Mai a Mis Ionawr (May and January). The poem itself does not name the month, but the editor Dafydd Johnston argues that November is meant, not January.
- Y Don ar Afon Dyfi (The Wave on the River Dyfi) Travelling back from North Wales, Dafydd is frustrated to find the River Dyfi (or Dovey) in full spate, preventing him from seeing Morfudd.
- Gwawd Morfudd (Morfudd's Mockery): Dafydd addresses Morfudd's declaration that she does not want a lover with a monk's tonsure. He denies that he has ever been a monk, flatters her, and reminds her how they had once made love in her bed.
- Offeren y Llwyn (The Woodland Mass). Early in the morning Dafydd is in the woods listening to a song-thrush which has been sent to him as a messenger by Morfudd. In the second half of the poem he compares the singing of the birds in the birch grove to a religious service held in the open air. The editor Dafydd Johnston points out that there is a potentially blasphemous aspect since the chalice which is raised up in the service is filled with desire and love.
- Gwallt Morfudd (Morfudd's Hair). Dafydd praises the beautiful hair of a girl, using a string of inventive metaphors. In the last part of the poem he contrasts it with the ugly scant hair of Cynwrig Cinnin, who, it turns out, is Morfudd's husband. Morfudd's name is only revealed in the very last line of the poem.
- Dan y Bargod (Under the Eaves). Dafydd is waiting outside Morfudd's house all night suffering in the rain and cold, hoping she will come to the door. The poem imitates the genre of serenade poems common in medieval European literature.
- Gofyn Cymod (Requesting Reconciliation). Dafydd praises Morfudd but complains that she is fickle or inconstant. Even if he made a joke which angered her, she should forgive him, just as Jesus and his mother Mary forgave their enemies. He tells her than living in anger is a sin, and begs her to forgive him.
- Galw ar Ddwynwen (A Prayer to Dwynwen). Dafydd prays to Dwynwen, patron saint of lovers, whose shrine was in Llandwyn near Newborough in Anglesey, and begs her to help him with his affair with Morfudd. He particularly asks her to restrain Morfudd's husband and to allow Morfudd to meet Dafydd in the woods in May.
- Taith i Garu (Journey for Love). Dafydd describes various journeys he has undertaken in all kinds of weather in the past hoping in vain for a glimpse of Morfudd. He mentions a number of places by name, some of which are located in the country around Brogynin, where Dafydd is said to have lived. At the end of the poem he recalls how he once made love to Morfudd in the woods near Gwernytalwrn. (This exact name is no longer found, but the element "Talwrn" occurs in some places near Goginan about three miles south east of Brogynin).
- Cystudd y Bardd (The Poet's Affliction). Morfudd has bewitched Dafydd, and he is ill with longing. She has sown his breast with seeds of love which have produced a crop of pain. She has banished him as a result of a false accusation and made him an outlaw; he has been shackled and tortured; he cannot live without her. – A feature of this poem is that each line begins with the letter ⟨H⟩, which has been said to represent the sound of sighing. (Compare the poem Dagrau Serch to Dyddgu, (see below), where each line begins with the letter ⟨D⟩.)
- Cyrchu Lleian (Wooing a Nun). Dafydd calls a messenger and reminds him that he did well before to fetch a girl for him. Now he requests him to go to Llanllugan Abbey (a Cistercian nunnery in Montgomeryshire) and fetch a nun for him, any nun, to meet him in the woods. All of them are foster-sisters of Morfudd. The editor Dafydd Johnston suggests that the point of the poem is to demonstrate that wooing Morfudd is as impossible as wooing a nun.
- Y Cleddyf (The Sword). Dafydd has acquired a sword, which he lovingly describes. He intends to use it to defend himself against the Jealous Husband (presumably Y Bwa Bach). He declares that he will not run away and says at the end, "I am not a retreater. I am Ovid. A lover's heart is always noble." Lines 22-32, all of which begin with the letter C, praising the sword, are particularly intricate and ornamented with cynghanedd.
- I Ddymuno Lladd y Gŵr Eiddig (To Wish the Jealous Husband Killed) A group of soldiers, including relatives of Dafydd, are leaving for France led by Rhys (thought to be Sir Rhys ap Gruffudd, a cousin of Dafydd's father). "Eiddig", the jealous husband (most probably Morfudd's husband), is going with them. If the husband gets on the ship alive, Dafydd hopes he will be washed overboard; if he arrives in France, Dafydd hopes he will be killed there. The poem is filled with inventive insults. Since Sir Rhys ap Gruffudd is known to have fought at the Battle of Crécy along with more than three thousand Welsh archers, it may be that the poem was written in 1346. However, Rhys also led parties of archers to France in 1342-3, 1347, 1351 and 1352 so the date cannot be determined exactly.
- Morfudd yn Hen (Morfudd Grown Old). Inspired by a friar's sermon, Dafydd imagines Morfudd grown old. He ends with a meditation on how quickly life passes.

==== Dyddgu ====
Another girl who is important in Dafydd's poetry is the aristocratic Dyddgu (Welsh pronunciation: ['dəðgɨ̞]), who is named in 11 poems (including one by Gruffudd Gryg). Among them are the following:

- Dyddgu: The poem starts by praising a nobleman, Ieuan ap Gruffudd, who was recently Dafydd's host; then Dafydd reveals that he has fallen in love with Ieuan's daughter Dyddgu. He retells the tale of the knight Peredur, who was reminded of his dark-haired beloved when he saw a dead blackbird.
- Dyddgu a Morfudd (Dyddgu and Morfudd): The poem starts with a eulogy of Dyddgu, in the manner of a court poet, then describes his passion for the exasperating Morfudd. The second half of the poem is an angry criticism of her husband. Dyddgu at this time is still unmarried, but Morfudd has a husband and children.
- Caru Merch Fonheddig (To Dyddgu): Dafydd speaks of the hopelessness of his love for Dyddgu, using various images such as an archer shooting arrows at a difficult target to illustrate that it is just possible that he might one day win her.
- Gwahodd Dyddgu (Dyddgu's invitation) Dafydd invites Dyddgu to a tryst in the countryside, describing the heavenly beauty of the birch grove where they will meet.
- Dagrau Serch (Love's tears). Dafydd praises Dyddgu's beauty and tells how much he is suffering for her love. Every line of the poem begins with the letter ⟨D⟩, a feature known as cymeriad llythrennol.
- Achau Hiraeth (The Pedigree of Longing): A dialogue poem where personified Hiraeth (Longing) arrives as a messenger sent by Dyddgu to torment the sleepless poet.
- Y Iwrch (The Roebuck). Dafydd describes a beautiful roebuck; he advises it how to avoid dogs and arrows, and asks it to carry a letter for him to Dyddgu.
- Y Gainc (The Tune). Dafydd sings a new tune to the harp. Alas that Dyddgu, if she is still living, cannot hear it!

==== Dafydd's four great loves ====
- Dewis Un o Bedair (Choosing One of Four). The poem is also called Caru'n Ddiffrwyth (Loving in Vain) by some editors, on the grounds that no choice is made. The poem has four sections, each telling of a different woman loved by Dafydd. First is Morfudd: "A girl gave me her love, the star of the region of Nantyseri" (thought to be the present day Cwm Seiri, half a mile from Brogynin). Despite her intense love for Dafydd, it seems she broke off the relationship "for fear of the displeasure of God". – Next is Elen, who was married to Robin Nordd, a cloth merchant of Aberystwyth; she rejected Dafydd's love, but gave him a gift of some stockings. Apparently she was English, since Dafydd says she spoke Welsh "with a sticky tongue". – Third is Dyddgu; despite the poems he wrote for her it seems that she too did not accept his love. – Fourthly is a lady whose name and home he keeps anonymous for fear of angering her, but he says he loves her more than any man or woman. At the end he says "All Gwynedd will praise her too", which suggests that she comes from Gwynedd.

=== Praise poems ===
Several of Dafydd's poems are praise-poems or eulogies dedicated to his patrons. Unlike the majority of Dafydd's poems, which generally use the simple cywydd deuair hirion metre, several of these poems are written in other more complex metres, namely englyn unodl union, toddaid and gwawdodyn. These poems in complex metres are heavily ornamented with cynghanedd and alliteration, often beyond what is strictly required.

==== Various patrons ====
The poems include the following:

- Moliant Llywelyn ap Gwilym (A Eulogy for Llywelyn ap Gwilym). This was Dafydd's maternal uncle, who held the constableship of Newcastle Emlyn in Carmarthenshire under the lordship of Gilbert Talbot in the 1340s. The poem begins with 3 stanzas of englyn unodl union followed by 36 lines of toddaid metre, all with the same rhyme -i.
- Marwnad Llywelyn ap Gwilym (An Elegy for Llywelyn ap Gwilym). This was written after Llywelyn's death in 1346, and it appears from the poem itself that Llywelyn was murdered. The poem consists of 35 englyn stanzas, 32 of them in the metre englyn unodl union, the other three being englyn proest cyfnewidiog.

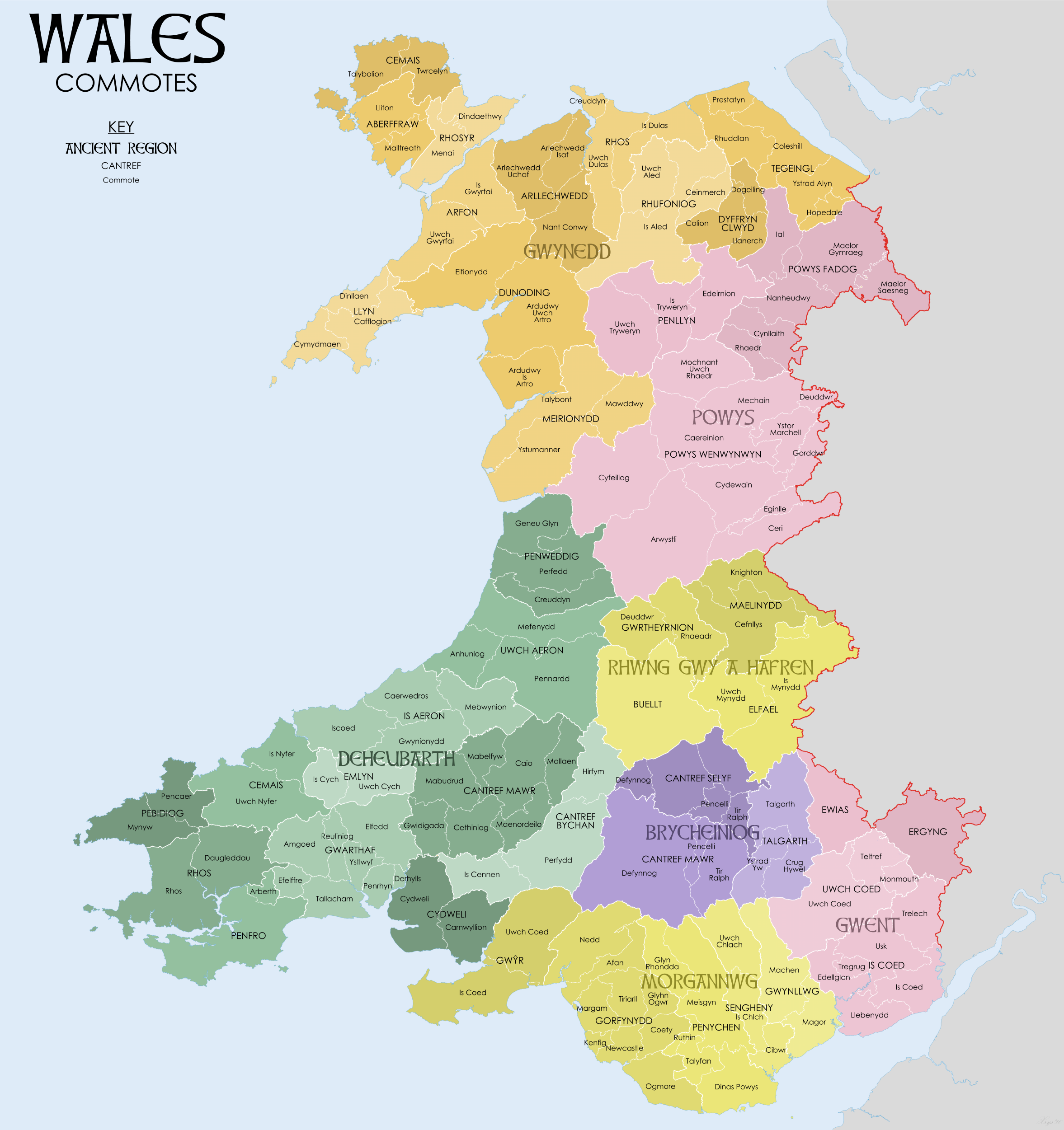
Commotes of Medieval Wales

- Moliant Ieuan Llwyd ab Ieuan Fwyaf (In praise of Ieuan Llwyd son of Ieuan Fwyaf). Ieuan Llwyd was constable of Genau'r Glyn commote (around modern Llandre, about 6 miles north of Aberystwyth) in 1332-3, and later Bailiff of the neighbouring commote of Perfedd in the 1340s. Dafydd is in Anglesey in May, well rewarded for his poetry. But he misses Ieuan and determines to go to him. The rest of the poem is filled with praise for Ieuan, and Dafydd describes him as his tadmaeth ("foster father"). The poem has 12 stanzas in the metre gwawdodyn byr, with the rhyme -aeth repeated throughout.
- Moliant Hywel, Deon Bangor (In praise of Hywel, the Dean of Bangor). This probably refers to Hywel ap Goronwy, who was Dean of Bangor around 1350. The poem praises him for his godliness, his talents as a musician, and his hospitality. There are three stanzas of englyn unodl union with various rhymes, followed by 8 stanzas of gwawdodyn byr, all with the rhyme -aidd in every line.
- Marwnad Angharad (An Elegy for Angharad). Angharad was the wife of Ieuan Llwyd ab Ieuan ap Gruffudd Foel of Glyn Aeron (near Llangeitho about 17 miles south of Aberystwyth) and bore him 14 children. It is not known if she was still alive when this poem was written. There are 9 stanzas of englyn unodl union with varying rhymes, followed by 22 couplets of toddaid all with the rhyme -ad. In addition almost every line of the toddaid begins with G-.
- Marwnad Rhydderch ab Ieuan Llwyd (An Elegy for Rhydderch son of Ieuan Llwyd). Rhydderch was the son of Ieuan Llwyd of Glyn Aeron and Angharad, and was alive at the time of this poem, since he did not die until the end of the century. Rhydderch is associated with the manuscript known as the White Book of Rhydderch. The poem is written in the cywydd deuair hirion metre.

==== Ifor Hael ====
The patron praised most often is Ifor ap Llywelyn, known as Ifor Hael, a nobleman of Bassaleg near Newport in Gwent. Although Dafydd does not explicity call Ifor "hael" ("generous"), it seems that because of his comparison of Ifor to Rhydderch Hael in two poems, Ifor became known as Ifor Hael to poets of the 15th century and later.

Dafydd wrote the following poems for Ifor:

- Cywydd Mawl i Ifor Hael (A Poem of Praise to Ifor Hael): In this poem, Dafydd compares Ifor to Rhydderch Hael (a famously generous ancient king of northern Britain) and declares that his fame will spread far and wide.
- Awdl i Ifor Hael (Ode to Ifor Hael): This poem is a tribute to Ifor’s status as a Chieftain. The poem is written partly in englyn unodl union stanzas and partly in highly elaborate stanzas of the toddaid metre, with the same rhyme "-or" continuing throughout the poem. The name Ifor comes at the end of all twelve stanzas.
- Englynion i Ifor Hael (Verses Addressed to Ifor Hael): A collection of four-line stanzas (englynion) that list ten of his patron's noble qualities, one in each stanza.
- Diolch am Fenig (Thanking for a Pair of Gloves): Dafydd warmly thanks Ifor for gifting him a pair of gloves.
- Basaleg: Dafydd sends a messenger from Glamorgan to Anglesey with a message that he cannot leave Bassaleg in South Wales because of his love for Ifor. He describes his patron's character and the activities they enjoy together.
- Ymadael ag Ifor Hael (Taking Leave of Ifor Hael): Dafydd excuses himself to Ifor saying that he is about to depart to Gwynedd. He praises Ifor, comparing him to the famously generous ancient king Rhydderch Hael.
- Marwnad Ifor a Nest (Elegy for Ifor and Nest): An elegy mourning the death of Ifor and his wife, Nest, praising them for their generosity. Scholars believe, however, that this is a pseudo-elegy, since Ifor outlived Dafydd; the poem ends by asking God to bless Ifor's old age. It is composed for four stanzas of englyn unodl union with various rhymes, followed by 15 toddaid verses (30 lines) with the rhyme -aint in every line.

In the poem Basaleg Dafydd describes some of the activities he enjoyed in Ifor's company. They include hunting with hounds, shooting stags (with arrows), hunting with hawks, drinking wine, singing poems, and playing backgammon and chess.

==== Praise of other poets ====
Three contemporary poets, Gruffudd Gryg, Madog Benfras, and Iolo Goch, all described Dafydd as a teacher (Gruffudd wrote: "I am his disciple, he taught me, a teacher of the cywydd". The first two seem to have had a particular close relationship with Dafydd, since they each wrote an elegy praising him, and he wrote elegies for each of them. (Evidently at least some of these were false elegies, written when the subject was still alive.) Dafydd also wrote an elegy for the poet Gruffudd ab Adda.

==== Praise of Newborough ====
- Niwbwrch (Newborough). Another praise poem is a cywydd addressed to the town of Newborough (Rhosyr) in south-west Anglesey. Dafydd calls the town "a profitable place for minstrelsy" and praises it particularly for its mead. This is the earliest cywydd of its kind in a genre later to become popular in Welsh poetry praising various locations. The town of Newborough also features in the comic poem Sarhau ei Was ("Insulting his Servant"), and one of his love-poems Galw ar Ddwynwen (A Prayer to Dwynwen) is in the form of a prayer to the local saint.

=== Satires ===
==== A satire against Rhys Meigen ====
- Dychan i Rhys Meigen (Satire for Rhys Meigen). This is a savage satire against a poet called Rhys Meigen, which according to a note in one of the manuscripts was performed at a Christmas feast at the court of Llywelyn ap Gwilym Fychan (Dafydd's maternal uncle). The poem is not a cywydd, but starts with a series of 16 stanzas of englyn unodl union, every line containing the rhyme -ai, followed by 12 couplets in toddaid metre, all in the rhyme -yrn. The whole poem is ornamented to a high degree with rhyme and alliteration. In addition, in the first ten stanzas the 1st, 3rd and 4th line of each englyn starts with the letter ⟨C⟩; in stanzas 11 to 16 this changes to ⟨G⟩; and in the rest of the poem many of the lines start with ⟨Rh⟩. Thus Dafydd not only mocks Rhys with insults but also crushes his spirit with a dazzling display of his poetic skill. The satire is said to have been so effective that Rhys Meigen died after hearing it ("if it's true what they say", adds the source).

==== The debate with Gruffudd Gryg ====
There is also a "debate" consisting of a series of four satirical poems by the Anglesey poet Gruffudd Gryg, with replies by Dafydd ap Gwilym, in which each disparages the other, trading ever more inventive insults and ending with each poet claiming to have slept with the other's mother, thus becoming the father of the other poet. Other evidence shows that this kind of verbal battle, reminiscent of a modern battle rap or diss track, was a common form of entertainment at festivals. All the eight poems in the debate are in the cywydd metre.

=== Religious poems ===
Despite the irreverent attitude to church-going and religious preaching which Dafydd displays in poems such as The Girls of Llanbadarn and The Poet and the Grey Friar, Dafydd also wrote at least three devotional Christian poems. These include the following:

- I'r Grog o Gaer (To the Rood of Carmarthen): This is a devotional poem praising a crucifix or rood, apparently in Carmarthen. The poem originally consisted of 50 elaborate stanzas in the metre englyn unodl union, but large parts of the manuscript are now illegible. It has been suggested that the handwriting of the manuscript may be that of Dafydd himself.
- Englynion yr Anima Christi (Stanzas on the Mass): It consists of a Latin prayer, the Anima Christi, split into separate lines. After each line there follows a stanza in Welsh in the metre englyn unodl union meditating on the prayer.
- Lluniau Crist a'r Apostolion (Pictures of Christ and His Apostles): This poem in cywydd metre is a meditation on a new painting of Christ and his disciples. It appears that the painting depicted Christ flanked by his apostles, six on either side.

The following, however, have been suspected by some scholars not to be by Dafydd:

- Y Drindod (The Trinity): A short poem of 6 couplets in the cywydd metre praising God the Father, Saint Anne, Saint Mary, and Jesus. Although all the manuscripts attribute it to Dafydd, some scholars doubt its authenticity because of its very simple style.
- Awdl i Iesu Grist (Ode to Jesus Christ): A poem describing Christ's life, the betrayal by Judas, the crucifixion, and the grief of the Virgin Mary. But the authenticity of this ode has been suspected on stylistic and other grounds. The poem is written mostly in the toddaid metre, with one englyn unodl union at the beginning.

=== Poems on old age ===
- Yr Adfail (The Ruin) In this famous poem Dafydd describes how he comes upon a ruined cottage where he once made love to a girl. The ruin replies to him, describing how it was destroyed by the eastern and southern winds. Dafydd is surprised and wonders if it is a delusion, since it seems like only yesterday that the house was standing. The house has the last word, assuring him that many people have gone to their graves since then.
- Englynion Bardd i'w Wallt (Englyns of the Poet to his Hair). A series of six stanzas of englyn unodl union, each one linked to the next by an echoed word. The poet describes looking into a mirror and being shocked to see his hair going grey. It is not known for certain that this poem is by Dafydd, but Ann Parry Owen gives reasons for thinking that it is probably his work. The final stanza ends with the word heddiw "today", which also begins the poem.

== Metre of the poems ==
Six different metres are used in Dafydd's poems, as follows:

- Cywydd deuair hirion

The great majority of Dafydd's extant poems are written in the cywydd deuair hirion ("long couplet cywydd") metre, often just called cywydd, which he may have invented or at any rate greatly popularised. This consists of rhyming couplets of seven-syllable lines ornamented with particular patterns of internal rhyme and consonance known as cynghanedd. In any couplet, one line must have a stressed rhyme and the other an unstressed one, in either order, for example iách ... thlýsach or ángor ... môr.

- Englyn unodl union

The second most frequently used metre in Dafydd's poems is the englyn unodl union, a four-line stanza of 10, 6, 7 and 7 syllables (the first two lines being a toddaid byr, and the last two lines being a cywydd deuair hirion couplet). Poems in this metre include I'r Grog o Gaer (To the Rood of Carmarthen), Englynion yr Anima Christi, Marwnad Llywelyn ap Gwilym and Englynion i Ifor Hael. A series of englynion is also found at the beginning of the poems listed below under toddaid and of one of the two poems in the gwawdodyn metre. The Englynion Bardd i'w Wallt ("A Poet's Verses to his Hair"), which Ann Parry Owen argues is by Dafydd, is also in this metre.

- Englyn proest cyfnewidiog

The poem Marwnad Llywelyn ap Gwilym (Elegy of Llywelyn ap Gwilym, Dafydd's uncle, who was murdered), among its 35 stanzas, contains three in a different metre, englyn proest cyfnewidiog. This is a stanza of 7, 7, 7 and 7 syllables, which is rhymed by assonance (proest) instead of rhyme (odl).

- Toddaid

Five poems are made using the toddaid metre. This metre consists of four-line stanzas of 10, 9, 10 and 9 syllables with a complex rhyme scheme. Each poem begins with a few stanzas of englyn unodl union before changing to toddaid. The metre is used in the Ode for Ifor Hael, the Elegy for Ivor and Nest, Praise for Llywelyn ap Gwilym (his maternal uncle), Elegy for Angharad, and Satire for Rhys Meigen. (Another poem, Awdl i Iesu Grist, also uses toddaid but for various reasons is thought not be authentic).

- Gwawdodyn byr

Two poems use gwawdodyn byr, consisting of stanzas of 9, 9, 10 and 9 syllables (the last two lines being a toddaid). In one of these poems, Moliant Ieuan Llwyd ab Ieuan Fwyaf the metre is used throughout; in the other, Moliant Hywel, Deon Bangor (Praise of Hywel, Dean of Bangor) three stanzas of englyn unodl union begin the poem, before the metre changes to gwawdodyn.

- Traethodl

One poem, The Poet and the Grey Friar, is written in traethodl (literally, "tract-rhyme"). This metre is very similar to the cywydd in having rhyming couplets of 7-syllable lines, except that it has almost no cynghanedd ornamentation, the language is simpler, and the rules for rhyme are less strict. It is thought to have been a popular precursor to the cywydd, which developed from it by adding strict rules of rhyme and ornamentation. Three other poems of the same kind are known, but some scholars consider them not by Dafydd.

== Dafydd's style of writing ==
Scholars have noted various characteristics in which the style of Dafydd ap Gwilym differs from that of later poets. On the whole, compared to 15th-century authors, Dafydd uses cynghanedd sain (combining internal rhyme with alliteration) more frequently and cynghanedd groes (in which a series of consonants is repeated in the second half of the line) less often than later poets. He also has quite a few poems where there are occasional lines with no cynghanedd at all (usually only in the first line of a couplet). In The Goose Shed and Girls of Llanbadarn, for example, over a third of the lines have no cynghanedd.

The proportion of different types of cynghanedd varies greatly from poem to poem. For example, cynghanedd sain ranges from 12% to 54% of lines, and cynghanedd groes from 4% to 57%. Poems which have very elaborate ornamentation, such as A Girl from Is Aeron, tend to have a higher proportion of cynghanedd groes. On the whole, however, Dafydd's cywydd poems typically have over 30% cynghanedd sain and roughly 60% consonantal cynghanedd of either sort. Proportions which greatly differ from this may be grounds for suspecting that a poem is not by Dafydd.

One notable characteristic of Dafydd is "the fluctuation between lines with very complex cynghanedd and ones with partial or no cynghanedd ". Thus some poems have simple vocabulary, simple syntax, and short sentences, with cynghanedd only lightly applied. For example, the following extract from Dawn has some cynghanedd (namely llusg, sain, llusg, and croes), but with only a few consonants repeated (noted in brackets):

Cyfod, er Crist, yn ddistaw,
Ac agor y dromddor draw. (D R stress)
Rhyfras camau dy ddeudroed,
Rhydaer yw'r cŵn, rhed i'r coed. (Rh D R C stress)

("Get up quietly, for Christ's sake,
and open the heavy door yonder.
The strides of your feet are very long,
the dogs are very fierce, run to the woods.")

The following example, on the other hand, from the courtly love poem A Girl from Is Aeron, is far more elaborate. It has one long sentence covering two couplets, with very rich cynghanedd (namely croes, sain, croes, croes), in which numerous consonants are repeated:

Gwae a gâr, gwiw y gorwyf, (G G stress R)
Gwen drais, gwenifiais gwayw nwyf, (G W N stress F)
Gwynllathr ei gwedd, gweunllethr gwawn, (G W N Ll Th R G W stress)
Gwynlliw'r geirw, gwenlloer Garawn. (G W N Ll R G stress R)

("Woe to the man who loves (I have acted worthily,
a girl's tyranny, I have served the spear of desire)
her whose face is shining white, gossamer-covered highland moor,
colour white as foaming waves, Caron's white moon.")

Three further marks of Dafydd's style are illustrated in the second example above. One is his fondness for using compound words in the more elaborate poems, such as gwynllathr and gweunllethr above. Ann Parry Owen comments on this as being one of Dafydd's characteristics and notes that words such as llwydwallt "grey hair" or loywgynt "formerly bright" are much rarer in other poets of the period.

The second characteristic is Dafydd's fondness for sangiad ("parenthesis" or "interpolation"). This consists of a personal reflection or exclamation interrupting the sentences, such as "I have acted worthily" or "a girl's tyranny!" in the extract above. These interpolations can add an ironic aside or express the poet's attitude, as in this example from Trouble at an Inn describing Dafydd making a noise while creeping about the inn at night:

Gweiddi, gŵr gorwag oeddwn, (G stress Dd, G stress R)
O'r cawg, a chyfarth o'r cŵn. (R C stress)

("There was a clattering (what a fool I was!)
from the basin and a barking from the dogs")

A sangiad can also usefully supply the consonants needed to complete the consonantal echoes of the cynghanedd. So in the last example, the consonants of -g oeddwn in the sangiad match those of gweiddi in the main sentence (cynghanedd draws). But here in addition the two words gŵr gorwag "completely foolish man" in the centre of the line also have alliteration, a type known as cynghanedd braidd gyffwrdd.

A third typical characteristic of Dafydd's style is his use of dyfalu (literally "conjecturing" or "comparing"), a term which refers to giving a series of vivid descriptive images used for giving the essence of a person or thing. Here gossamer, foaming waves, and the white moon are used to describe the girl's pale complexion. Similar series of images can be found in other poems, for example The Fox and The Mist. Another well-known poem with dyfalu is The Mirror, in which Dafydd describes a round hand-mirror in a series of sinister images as follows (the cynghanedd is sain, croes, croes, croes):

Lleuad las gron, gwmpas graen, (G stress)
Llawn o hud, llun ehedfaen, (Ll N H stress D)
Hadlyd liw, hudol o dlws – (H D L D L stress)
Hudolion a'i hadeilws. (H D stress L)

("A round blue moon, a dire circle,
full of magic, the appearance of a lodestone,
of a weak colour, an enchanting gem –
magicians made it.")

Dafydd was very innovative in the field of vocabulary as well. Nearly 800 words are attested in Dafydd for the first time in Welsh, including the common siarad (used of the chattering of birds, rather than human speech) and bach ("small, dear"). Many of the new words he adopts are words of a low register, used for conveying contempt. He also has several words borrowed from English, including the first attestation of the word gwn "gun" (used of his penis).

== Ancestry ==
Ancestors of Dafydd ap Gwilym

16. Gwilym ap Gwrwared
8. Einion Fawr ap Gwilym
17. Gwenllian ferch Ednyfed Fychan
4. Gwilym ab Einion Fawr
18. Sir Elidir Stackpole
9. N.N. ferch Sir Elidir Stackpole
2. Gwilym Gam ap Gwilym
20. Owain ap Maredudd
10. Llywelyn ab Owain
21. Angharad ferch Owain
5. Isabel ferch Llywelyn
1. Dafydd Llwyd ap Gwilym Gam
24. Llywelyn ab Ednyfed Fychan
12. Rhys ap Llywelyn
6. Gwilym ap Rhys
3. Ardudful ferch Gwilym

== Beethoven's Welsh Songs ==
The lyrics to the Lied 'Der Traum' in Ludwig van Beethoven's 1810 collection 26 Welsh Songs are a German translation and adaption of a dream-vision poem supposedly by Dafydd, though not to be found among his works or in his apocrypha.

== See also ==
- Welsh literature
- List of Welsh language poets
- Dafydd ap Gwilym Society, University of Oxford
- To the Yew Tree Above Dafydd ap Gwilym's Grave

== Bibliography ==
- Bartrum, P. C., ed. (1976). Welsh Genealogies: AD 300-1400. Cardiff: University of Wales Press. doi:10.20391/40837b6f-1887-4afd-9c6e-9b7e3a122693. ISBN 070830561X. Archived from the original on 6 June 2023.
- Bollard, John K. and Griffiths, Anthony (2019), Dafydd ap Gwilym's Wales (Gwasg Carreg Gwalch).
- Bromwich, Rachel (1974). Dafydd ap Gwilym, Writers of Wales series. (Cardiff, University of Wales Press). An introduction in English.
- Bromwich, Rachel (1986). Aspects of the Poetry of Dafydd ap Gwilym (Cardiff, University of Wales Press).
- Bromwich, Rachel (ed.) (2003), Dafydd ap Gwilym: Poems, Welsh Classics series (Llandysul, Gomer Press).
- Crawford, T. D. (1985). "The Englynion of Dafydd ap Gwilym". Études Celtiques. 22: 235–285.
- Crawford, T. D. (1990). "The Toddaid and Gwawdodyn byr in the poetry of Dafydd ap Gwilym, with an Appendix concerning the Traethodlau attributed to him". Études Celtiques. 27: 301–336.
- Edwards, Hugh Meirion (2010). "The Literary Context" (essay on Dafydd ap Gwilym and his predecessors).
- Fulton, Helen (1989) Dafydd ap Gwilym and the European Context (Cardiff, University of Wales Press).
- Fulton, Helen (ed.) (1996). Selections from the Dafydd ap Gwilym Apocrypha, Welsh Classics series (Llandysul, Gomer Press).
- Johnston, Dafydd and others (2007). dafyddapgwilym.net. (University of Swansea). (online Welsh text, English translations, and notes for each poem.)
- Johnston, Dafydd (2017), "Language Contact and Linguistic Innovation in the Poetry of Dafydd ap Gwilym", E. C. Quiggin Memorial Lecture 19.
- Loomis, Richard Morgan (1982), Dafydd ap Gwilym: The Poems. Medieval and Renaissance Texts and Studies, Center for Medieval and Early Renaissance Studies, Binghamton, New York. English translations.
- "Maelog" (the bardic name of Arthur James Johnes) (1834). Translations into English Verse from the Poems of Davyth ap Gwilym, a Welsh Bard of the Fourteenth Century.
- Parry, Thomas (ed.) (1963), Gwaith Dafydd ap Gwilym (2nd revised ed., Caerdydd, Gwasg Prifysgol Cymru). Edited texts with extensive notes.
- Thomas, Gwyn (ed.) (2001), Dafydd ap Gwilym: His Poetry (Cardiff, University of Wales Press). Includes a complete translation of the poems and an introduction.
