= Rhyme scheme =

Pattern of rhymes at the end of each line of a poem or song

A rhyme scheme is the pattern of rhymes at the end of each line of a poem or song. It is usually referred to by using letters to indicate which lines rhyme; lines designated with the same letter all rhyme with each other.

An example of the ABAB rhyming scheme, from "To Anthea, who may Command him Anything", by Robert Herrick:

Bid me to weep, and I will weep	A
While I have eyes to see	B
And having none, yet I will keep	A
A heart to weep for thee	B

== Function in writing ==
These rhyme patterns have various effects, and can be used to:

- Control flow: If every line has the same rhyme (AAAA), the stanza will read as having a very quick flow, whereas a rhyme scheme like ABCABC can be felt to unfold more slowly.
- Structure a poem's message and thought patterns: For example, a simple couplet with a rhyme scheme of AABB lends itself to simpler direct ideas, because the resolution comes in the very next line. Essentially these couplets can be thought of as self-contained statements. This idea of rhyme schemes reflecting thought processes is often discussed particularly regarding sonnets.
- Determine whether a stanza is balanced or unbalanced.
- Help to reinforce the feeling being expressed: If the writer wants to express stubbornness, they may use tight structured rhyme schemes, whereas if one was writing about feeling lost, then perhaps the stanza would only have one rhyme (XXAXXXA).

A basic distinction is between rhyme schemes that apply to a single stanza, and those that continue their pattern throughout an entire poem (see chain rhyme). There are also more elaborate related forms, like the sestina – which requires repetition of exact words in a complex pattern. Rhyming is not a mandatory feature of poetry; a four-line stanza with non-rhyming lines could be described as using the scheme ABCD.

== Notation and examples ==
Notation used below:

- ABAB – Four-line stanza, first and third lines rhyme at the end, second and fourth lines rhyme at the end.
- AB AB – Two two-line stanzas, with the first lines rhyming at the end and the second lines rhyming at the end.
- AB,AB – Single two-line stanza, with the two lines having both a single internal rhyme and a conventional rhyme at the end.
- aBaB – Two different possible meanings for a four-line stanza:
  - First and third lines rhyme at the end, second and fourth lines are repeated verbatim.
  - First and third lines have a feminine rhyme and the second and fourth lines have a masculine rhyme.
- A^{1}abA^{2} A^{1}abA^{2} – Two stanzas, where the first lines of both stanzas are exactly the same, and the last lines of both stanzas are the same. The second lines of the two stanzas are different, but rhyme at the end with the first and last lines. (In other words, all the "A" and "a" lines rhyme with each other, but not with the "b" lines.)
- XAXA – Four lines, two unrhymed (X) and two with the same end rhyme (A)

Other notation examples:

- Indicating the number of stressed syllables in certain lines: AA^{4}B^{2}CC^{4} or AA_{4}B_{2}CC_{4}
- Some publications use lowercase or have punctuation to separate lines or stanzas, e.g. abba cdcd or a-b-b-a,c-d-c-d. (These variations are not used elsewhere in this article, for clarity.)

Notable rhyme schemes and forms that use specific rhyme schemes:

- Ballad stanza: ABCB
- Ballade: Three stanzas of ABABBCBC followed by BCBC
- Balliol rhyme: AABB
- Boy Named Sue: AABCC(B, or infrequently D)
- Bref double: AXBC XAXC AXAB AB and other schemes, where "X" represents unrhymed lines
- Burns stanza: AAABAB(B) or AABCCCB
- Canopus: ABABCBC}
- Chant royal: Five stanzas of ababccddedE followed by either ddedE or ccddedE (capital letters represent lines repeated verbatim)
- Chastushka: ABAB, ABCB, or AABB
- Cinquain: ABABB
- Clerihew: AABB
- Couplet: AA, but usually occurs as AA BB CC DD ...
- Décima: ABBAACCDDC
- Double dactyl: XXXA XXXA
- Enclosed rhyme (or enclosing rhyme): ABBA
- Englyn: complex structure
- "Fire and Ice" stanza: ABAABCBCB as used in Robert Frost's poem "Fire and Ice"
- Keatsian Ode: ABABCDECDE used in Keats' Ode on Indolence, Ode on a Grecian Urn, and Ode to a Nightingale.
- Klin: complex structure
- Limerick: AABBA
- Lutherstrophe: ABABCCB or ABABCCX
- Mâni: AABA
- Monorhyme: AAAAA... an identical rhyme on every line, common in Latin and Arabic
- Octave: ABBA ABBA
- Onegin stanzas: aBaBccDDeFFeGG with the lowercase letters representing feminine rhymes and the uppercase representing masculine rhymes, written in iambic tetrameter
- Ottava rima: ABABABCC
- A quatrain is any four-line stanza or poem. There are 15 possible rhyme sequences for a four-line poem; common rhyme schemes for these include AAAA, AABB, ABAB, ABBA, and ABCB.
- "The Raven" stanza: ABCBBB, or AA,B,CC,CB,B,B when accounting for internal rhyme, as used by Edgar Allan Poe in his poem "The Raven"
- Rhyme royal: ABABBCC
- The Road Not Taken stanza: ABAAB as used in Robert Frost's poem The Road Not Taken, and in Glæde over Danmark by Poul Martin Møller.
- Rondeau: ABaAabAB (capital letters represent lines repeated verbatim)
- Rondelet: AbAabbA (capital letters represent lines repeated verbatim)
- Roundel: abaB bab abaB (capital letters represent lines repeated verbatim)
- Rubaiyat: AABA or AAAA
- Sapphic stanza in Polish poetry – various
- Scottish stanza: AAABAB, as used by Robert Burns in works such as "To a Mouse"
- Sestain: AABBCC, ABABCC, AABCCB, AAABAB, and others
- Sestet: various schemes depending on the country
- Sestina: ABCDEF FAEBDC CFDABE ECBFAD DEACFB BDFECA, the seventh stanza is a tercet where line 1 has A in it but ends with D, line 2 has B in it but ends with E, line 3 has C in it but ends with F
- Sestuplo-nel-quintetto: Any quantity of stanzas of AABCCB, occasionally followed by either a repeating pattern of BCCB, or AA, plainly.
- Sicilian octave: ABABABAB
- Simple 4-line: ABCB
- Sonnet, 14 lines:
  - 4 + 4 + 3 + 3 lines:
    - Petrarchan sonnet: ABBA ABBA CDE CDE or ABBA ABBA CDC DCD
  - 4 + 4 + 4 + 2 lines
    - Shakespearean sonnet: ABAB CDCD EFEF GG
    - Spenserian sonnet: ABAB BCBC CDCD EE
- Spenserian stanza: ABABBCBCC, where the last line is an alexandrine line
- Stopping by Woods on a Snowy Evening form: AABA BBCB CCDC DDDD, a modified Ruba'i stanza used by Robert Frost for the eponymous poem
- Tail rhyme: B lines appear intermittently
- Tanaga: traditional Tagalog tanaga is AABB
- Terza rima: ABA BCB CDC ..., ending on YZY Z; YZY ZZ; or YZY ZYZ
- A tristich or tercet is any three-line stanza or poem; common rhyme schemes for these are AAA (triplet) and ABA (enclosed tercet). The only other possibilities for three-line poems are AAB, ABB, and ABC. Multiple tercets can be combined into longer poems, as in the terza rima form.
- Traditional rhyme: ABAB CDCD EFEF GHGH...
- Triolet: ABaAabAB and others (capital letters represent lines repeated verbatim)
- Triplet: AAA, often repeating such as: AAA BBB CCC DDD...
- Trova: XAXA
- Villanelle: A^{1}bA^{2} abA^{1} abA^{2} abA^{1} abA^{2} abA^{1}A^{2}, where A^{1} and A^{2} are lines repeated exactly which rhyme with the "a" lines

== In hip-hop music ==
Hip-hop music and rapping's rhyme schemes include traditional schemes such as couplets, as well as forms specific to the genre, which are broken down extensively in the books How to Rap and Book of Rhymes. Rhyme schemes used in hip-hop music include

- Couplets
- Single-liners
- Multi-liners
- Combinations of schemes
- Whole verse

Couplets are the most common type of rhyme scheme in old school rap and are still regularly used, though complex rhyme schemes have progressively become more frequent. Rather than relying on end rhymes, rap rhyme schemes can have rhymes placed anywhere in the bars of music to create a structure. There can also be numerous rhythmic elements which all work together in the same scheme – this is called internal rhyme in traditional poetry, though rap rhymes schemes can be anywhere in the bar, they could all be internal, so the term is not always used. Rap verses can also employ 'extra rhymes', which do not structure the verse like the main rhyme schemes, but which add to the overall sound of the verse.

== Number of rhyme schemes for a poem with n lines ==
Tale of Genji chapter symbols, including diagrams of the first 52 set partitions

The number of different possible rhyme schemes for an n-line poem is given by the Bell numbers, which for n = 1, 2, 3, ... are

1, 2, 5, 15, 52, 203, 877, 4140, 21147, 115975, .. (sequence A000110 in the OEIS).

Examples: We find one rhyme scheme for a one-line poem (A), two different rhyme schemes for a two-line poem (AA, AB), and five for a three-line poem: AAA, AAB, ABA, ABB, and ABC.

These counts, however, include rhyme schemes in which rhyme is not employed at all (ABCD). There are many fewer rhyme schemes when all lines must rhyme with at least one other line; a count of these is given by the numbers,

0, 1, 1, 4, 11, 41, 162, 715, 3425, 17722, ... (sequence A000296 in the OEIS).

For example, for a three-line poem, there is only one rhyming scheme in which every line rhymes with at least one other (AAA), while for a four-line poem, there are four such schemes (AABB, ABAB, ABBA, and AAAA).
