= Englynion y Clywaid =

Poems of the Audition
- by Unknown
- Original title: Englynion y Clywaid
- Written: c. 1100
- Country: Wales
- Language: Welsh
- Subject(s): Welsh proverbs, folklore, and Saints
- Form: Englyn

Englynion y Clywaid (or Englynion y Clyweit) is a collection of 73 three-line Welsh stanzas (englynion). Each stanza begins with the phrase A glyweist-di a gant...? ("Did you hear what (X) sang?") to introduce a piece of traditional wisdom, a proverb, or advice attributed to a famous historical or mythical figure.

The date of the poem is uncertain. It was formerly thought to have been written around the 10th century, but more recently Ifor Williams, as well as other academics, have placed it in the late 12th or early 13th century.

The metre for all the stanzas is similar to the englyn milwr ("soldier's englyn") but differs in its line-lengths; it consists of a line of eight syllables (occasionally nine syllables), followed by two seven-syllable lines (but sometimes 6 or 8 syllables). All the lines of a stanza have the same rhyme.

The earliest manuscript witnesses are Jesus College MS 3 (c. 1350) and NLW Llanstephan MS 27, the Red Book of Talgarth (c. 1400), the latter almost exclusively in the hand of Hywel Fychan, main scribe of the Red Book of Hergest).

== Style ==
Each englyn begins with the opening phrase "A glyweist-di a gant...?" ("Did you hear what (X) sang?"), followed by the name of a character from Welsh tradition, or one of the Welsh saints. The answer is in the form of a traditional proverb, most of which are attributed to characters from Welsh folklore, or Welsh and foreign saints. The exceptions are those given in the mouths of animals.

The selection of Welsh characters includes a number of characters from Culhwch and Olwen, and the work as a whole describes a selection of mythical, historical or semi-historical heroes and Christian saints.

== Example ==
An example of the stanzas is verse 12 of the poem, which reads as follows (in modern spelling):

A glyweist-di a gant Cynfarch?
'Bid dy ysgwyd ar dy farch;
A'r ni'th barcho di na pharch'

("Did you hear what Cynfarch sang?
'Let your shield be on your horse;
And who does not respect you, do not respect him'.")

(Cynfarch was a king of Rheged (modern Cumbria) in the 6th century A.D.)

== History ==
The poem is a reflection of the antiquarian interest of the 13th and 14th centuries when there was a great deal of collecting, composing and recording of proverbial material by learned Welshmen in a spirit which is compared by Kenneth H. Jackson to the antiquarian mindset that later spurred on the editors of The Myvyrian Archaiology of Wales in the early 19th century.

Other heroes include Llywarch Hen, Heledd, Urien Rheged, Gwenddolau and Geraint fab Erbin. From the world of legends there are characters such as Culhwch, Drystan, and Cadriaith mab Seidi . The author has a particular fondness for South Wales saints, including Idloes, David, Padarn, Gwynllyw and Teilo, which suggests he is a native of South Wales.
