= Lutherstrophe =

Lutherstrophe (German: [ˈlʊtɐʃtʁoːfə]) is a seven-line strophe used in Occitan and German song and literature. Rooted in Old Occitan lyric poetry and Minnesang, the strophe became popular in 16th-century Lutheran hymn. It is named after Martin Luther.

== History ==
Chronology

- Old Occitan lyric poetry, Troubadour
- Cantiga de amor
- Minnesang
- German folk song
- Lutheran hymn
- German poetry

== Form ==
The rhyme scheme is $\mathrm{ABABCCB}$ or $\mathrm{ABABCCX}$. The seven individual lines are iambic. The first four lines are an alternating rhyme $\mathrm{ABAB}$, like in German folk songs. This is followed by two lines of a third rhyme $\mathrm{C}$, a couplet rhyme. The last line, as conclusion, is again the second rhyme $\mathrm{B}$ or does not rhyme $\mathrm{X}$, an orphan. Thus it consists of a quatrain and a tercet. The scheme is related to rhyme royal $\mathrm{ABABBCC}$ in English literature.

== Examples ==
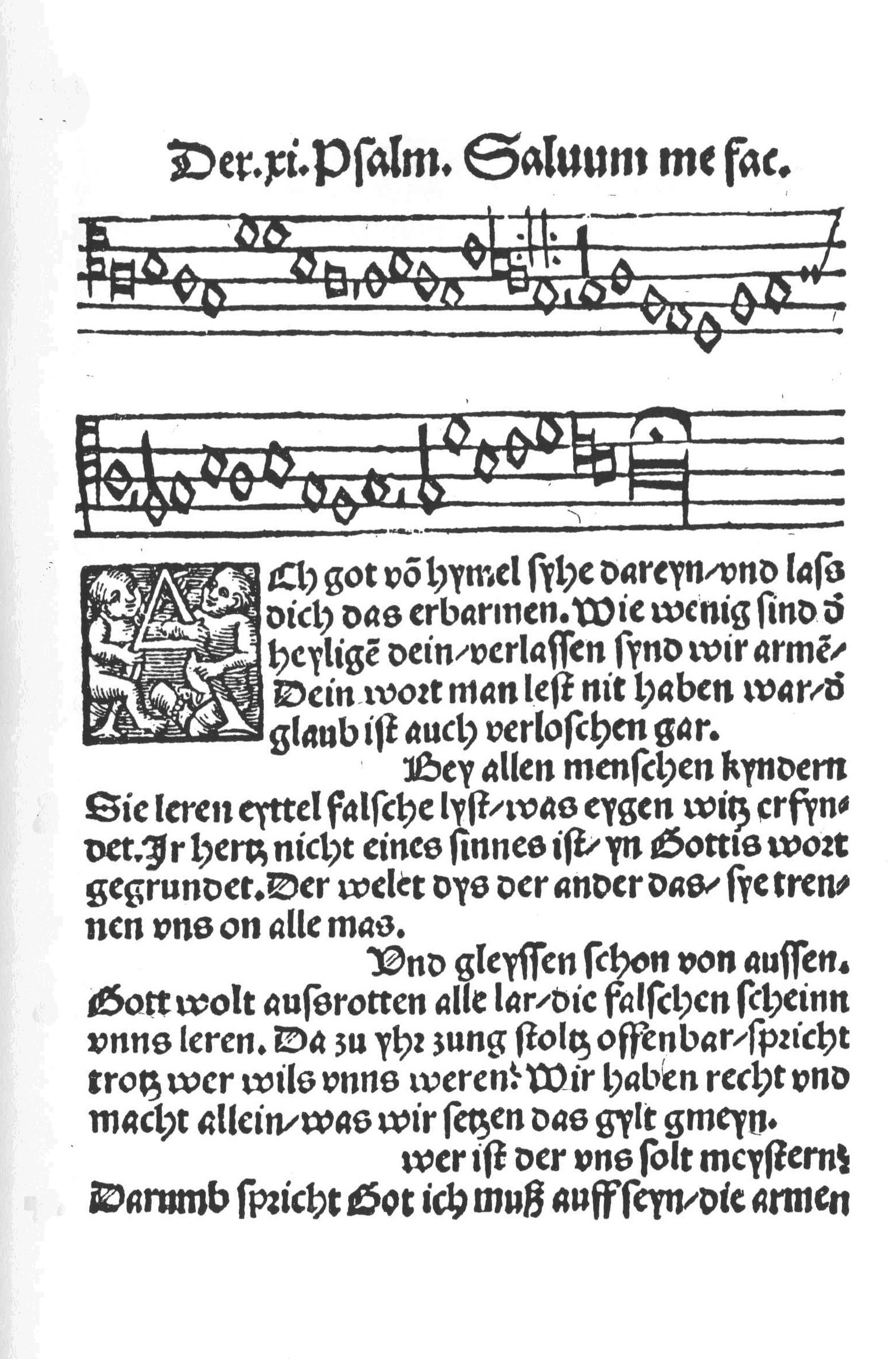
Ach Gott, vom Himmel sieh darein

=== Psalm 12 ===
- Luther: Ach Gott, vom Himmel sieh darein

Ach Gott, vom Himmel sieh' darein
Und lass' dich des erbarmen,
Wie wenig sind der Heil'gen dein,
Verlassen sind wir Armen:
Dein Wort man laesst nicht haben wahr,
Der Glaub' ist auch verloschen gar
Bei allen Menschenkindern.

Rhyme scheme: $\mathrm{A_8 \,\, B_7 \,\, A_8 \,\, B_7 \,\, C_8 \,\, C_8 \,\, X_7}$

=== Psalm 130 ===
- Luther: Aus tiefer Not schrei ich zu dir

Ob bei uns ist der Sünden viel,
bei Gott ist viel mehr Gnaden.
Sein Hand zu helfen hat kein Ziel,
wie groß auch sei der Schaden.
Er ist allein der gute Hirt,
der Israel erlösen wird
aus seinen Sünden allen.

Rhyme scheme: $\mathrm{A_8 \,\, B_7 \,\, A_8 \,\, B_7 \,\, C_8 \,\, C_8 \,\, X_7}$

=== Ich steh an deiner Krippen hier ===
- Paul Gerhardt: Ich steh an deiner Krippen hier

JCh steh an deiner krippen hier /
O Jesulein mein leben /
Jch komme / bring und schencke dir /
Was du mir hast gegeben.
Nim hin es ist mein geist und sinn /
Hertz / seel und muth / nimm alles hin
Vnd laß dirs wol gefallen

Rhyme scheme: $\mathrm{A_8 \,\, B_7 \,\, A_8 \,\, B_7 \,\, C_8 \,\, C_8 \,\, X_7}$

=== Other hymns ===
- Luther: Nun freut euch, lieben Christen g'mein
- Fest soll mein Taufbund immer stehn

=== Der Sänger ===
Was hör’ ich draußen vor dem Thor,
Was auf der Brücke schallen?
Laß den Gesang vor unserm Ohr
Im Saale wiederhallen!
Der König sprach’s, der Page lief;
Der Knabe kam, der König rief:
Laßt mir herein den Alten!

Gegrüßet seyd mir, edle Herrn,
Gegrüßt ihr, schöne Damen!
Welch reicher Himmel! Stern bei Stern!
Wer kennet ihre Namen?
Im Saal voll Pracht und Herrlichkeit
Schließt, Augen, euch; hier ist nicht Zeit,
Sich staunend zu ergetzen.

Der Sänger drückt’ die Augen ein,
Und schlug in vollen Tönen;
Die Ritter schauten muthig drein,
Und in den Schoos die Schönen.
Der König, dem das Lied gefiel,
Ließ, ihn zu ehren für sein Spiel,
Eine goldne Kette reichen.

Die goldne Kette gib mir nicht,
Die Kette gib den Rittern,
Vor deren kühnem Angesicht
Der Feinde Lanzen splittern;
Gib sie dem Kanzler, den du hast,
Und laß ihn noch die goldne Last
Zu andern Lasten tragen.

Ich singe wie der Vogel singt,
Der in den Zweigen wohnet;
Das Lied, das aus der Kehle dringt,
Ist Lohn, der reichlich lohnet.
Doch darf ich bitten, bitt’ ich eins:
Laß mir den besten Becher Weins
In purem Golde reichen.

Er setzt’ ihn an, er trank ihn aus:
O Trank voll süßer Labe!
O wohl dem hochbeglückten Haus,
Wo das ist kleine Gabe!
Ergeht’s euch wohl, so denkt an mich,
Und danket Gott so warm, als ich
Für diesen Trunk euch danke.

Johann Wolfgang von Goethe

Rhyme scheme: $\mathrm{6 \,\, x \,\, A_8 \,\, B_7 \,\, A_8 \,\, B_7 \,\, C_8 \,\, C_8 \,\, X_7}$

=== Die Hermannsschlacht ===
Die Hermannsschlacht (Kleist)

Ein Knabe sah den Mondenschein
In eines Teiches Becken;
Er faßte mit der Hand hinein,
Den Schimmer einzustecken;
Da trübte sich des Wassers Rand,
Das glänz'ge Mondesbild verschwand
Und seine Hand war –

Heinrich von Kleist

Rhyme scheme: $\mathrm{A_8 \,\, B_7 \,\, A_8 \,\, B_7 \,\, C_8 \,\, C_8 \,\, X_5}$

=== Das Mädchen mit dem Muttermal ===
Woher sie kam, wohin sie ging,
Das hab' ich nie erfahren.
Sie war ein namenloses Ding
Von etwa achtzehn Jahren.
Sie küßte selten ungestüm.
Dann duftete es wie Parfüm
Aus ihren keuschen Haaren.

Wir spielten nur, wir scherzten nur;
Wir haben nie gesündigt.
Sie leistete mir jeden Schwur
Und floh dann ungekündigt,
Entfloh mit meiner goldnen Uhr
Am selben Tag, da ich erfuhr,
Man habe mich entmündigt.

Verschwunden war mein Siegelring
Beim Spielen oder Scherzen.
Sie war ein zarter Schmetterling.
Ich werde nie verschmerzen,
Wie vieles Goldene sie stahl,
Das Mädchen mit dem Muttermal
Zwei Handbreit unterm Herzen

Joachim Ringelnatz

Rhyme scheme: $\mathrm{3 \,\, x \,\, A_8 \,\, B_7 \,\, A_8 \,\, B_7 \,\, C_8 \,\, C_8 \,\, X_7}$

=== Variant: Cantiga de amor ===
Quer’eu agora ja meu coraçon
esforçar ben e non morrer assi,
e quer’ir ora, si Deus mi perdon,
u é mia senhor; e, pois eu for i,
querrei-me de mui gran medo quitar
que ei dela, e, mentr’ela catar
alhur, catarei ela log’enton,

ca, per bõa fe, á mui gran sazon
que ei eu [gran] medo de mia senhor
mui fremosa; mais agora ja non
averei medo, pois ant’ela for,
ante me querrei mui ben esforçar
e perder med’, e, mentr’ela catar
alhur, catarei ela log’enton.

A mui máis fremosa de quantas son
oje no mund’, aquesto sei eu ben,
quer’ir veer, e acho ja razon
como a veja sen med’e con sén:
irei vee-la e q[ue]rrei falar
con outra d’i, e, mentr’ela catar
alhur, catarei [ela log’enton].

Men Rodriguez Tenoiro

Rhyme scheme: $\mathrm{3 \,\, x \,\, a_{10} \,\, b_{10} \,\, a_{10} \,\, b_{10} \,\, c_{10} \,\, c_{10} \,\, A_{10}}$
