= Befis =

Befis (Syr Befis Llên) was a Welsh poet. He wrote englynion, traditional Welsh short poems, a number of which are located in the National Library of Wales. They are included in two sets of records, Bodewryd MS. 2, a 17th–18th-century manuscript titled Welsh Poetry, etc and in Sotheby MS. A1.
