= Claf Abercuawg =

Medieval Welsh poem

Claf Abercuawg stanzas 1-10

Claf Abercuawg (IPA /klav ˌaber'ki:aug/, 'the leper of Abercuawg') is the modern title of a 32-stanza medieval Welsh englyn-poem. According to Jenny Rowland, 'most critics would classify it among the most sophisticated and moving all the early englynion poems'; it is 'the classic example' of meditative, lyric, at least implicitly religious, early Welsh poetry.

== Content and style ==
The poem gradually reveals itself as a monologue by a person who is ill, probably with leprosy, as he laments his exile from society and the ruin of his homestead. It is characterised by the use of the natural world as a frame and reference point for human emotion, by a shifting focus between the speaker's observations on his particular situation and gnomic observations on life in general, and by jumps from one subject to another producing tantalising juxtapositions. The poem has frequently been compared (and contrasted) with the roughly contemporaneous Old English poems The Wanderer and The Seafarer.

== Manuscripts and dating ==
The poem is attested principally in the late fourteenth-century Red Book of Hergest (p. 514, column 1034 line 24–column 1035 end). It was also included in the White Book of Rhydderch, but is now lost due to damage to the manuscript. However, it is attested in two later manuscripts descended from the White Book, Peniarth 111 (made by John Jones of Gellillyfdy in 1607), whose spelling is very close to the White Book's, and London, British Library, Add. MS 31055 (made by Thomas Wiliems in 1596), which is a less conservative copy. National Library of Wales 4973 section b contains the poem. Its relationship to the other manuscripts is complex and may represent a conflation of multiple medieval sources, but it seems to have at least some independent value as a witness to the lost archetype of the poem. It is fairly clear that all these manuscripts descend from a lost common original, to which they are all fairly similar, making the creation of a critical edition of the poem relatively straightforward. In all the independent witnesses, Claf Abercuawg precedes the cycle of englyn-poems known as Canu Llywarch Hen; indeed, in the White Book, Claf Abercuawg is entitled 'Englynion Mabclaf ap Llywarch' (‘englynion of Mabclaf son of Llywarch’). However, modern scholars do not see it as linked to the Llywarch Hen material.

Despite surviving first in fourteenth-century manuscripts and in largely Middle Welsh orthography, the poem is thought to have been composed in Old Welsh and transmitted orally and/or in manuscript, due to its archaic style and occasionally archaic spelling. Jenny Rowland judged that it dates from between the mid and late ninth century.

== Influence ==
The poem was translated into English by the poet Edward Thomas in his influential book Beautiful Wales (1905). It was also influential on R. S. Thomas, who gave a lecture entitled Abercuawg in 1977, referring several times to Claf Abercuawg.

== Text and translation ==
As edited by Ifor Williams and translated by Jenny Rowland, the poem runs:

	Middle Welsh text	Translation
1	Goreiste ar vrynn a eruyn uym bryt, A heuyt ny'm kychwyn. Byrr vyn teith; diffeith vyn tydyn.	My spirit craves to sit for a long time on a hill But neither does that bestir me. My journey is short, my homestead is desolate.
2	Llem awel; llwm benedyr byw. Pan orwisc coet teglyw Haf, teryd glaf wyf hediw.	Piercing is the wind; bare ?...... When the woods put on the fair colour of summer. I am ?feverishly ill today.
3	Nyt wyf anhyet; milet ny chatwaf. Ny allaf darymret. Tra vo da gan goc, canet!	I am not active, I do not keep a host, I cannot go about. While it pleases the cuckoo let it sing.
4	Coc lauar a gan gan dyd Kyfreu eichyawc yn dolyd Cuawc. Gwell corrawc no chebyd.	A vocal cuckoo sings with the daybreak a loud song in the meadows of Cuawg. A prodigal is better than a miser.
5	Yn Aber Cuawc yt ganant gogeu Ar gangheu blodeuawc. Coc lauar, canet yrawc.	In Abercuawg cuckoos sing on flowering branches. Vocal cuckoo, let it sing for a long time to come.
6	Yn Aber Cuawc yt ganant gogeu Ar gangheu blodeuawc. Gwae glaf a'e clyw yn vodawc.	In Abercuawg cuckoos sing on flowering branches. Woe to the sick man who hears them constantly.
7	Yn Aber Cuawc, cogeu a ganant. Ys atuant gan vym bryt A'e kigleu nas clyw heuyt.	In Abercuawg cuckoos sing. My heart finds it wretched that one who has heard them does not hear them also.
8	Neus e[n]deweis i goc ar eidorwc brenn. Neu'r laesswys vyg kylchwy. Etlit a gereis neut mwy.	I have listened to a cuckoo on an ivy-covered tree. My clothing has become loose. Grief for that which I loved is greater.
9	Yn y vann odywch llonn dar Yd e[n]dewis i leis adar. Coc uann, cof gan bawp a gar.	On the height above the strong oak I listened to the cries of the birds. Noisy cuckoo, everyone remembers that which he loves.
10	Kethlyd kathyl uodawc hiraethawc y llef, Teith odef, tuth hebawc. Coc vreuer yn Aber Cuawc.	Singer of continual song, its cry full of longing, intending to wander, of hawk-like movement is the vocal cuckoo in Abercuawg.
11	Gordyar adar; gwlyb neint. Llewychyt lloer; oer deweint. Crei vym bryt rac gofit heint.	Noisy are the birds; wet the valleys. The moon shines; the dead of night is cold. My heart is raw because of the affliction of disease.
12	Gwynn gwarthaf [bre; gwlyb] neint; deweint hir. Keinmygir pob kywreint. Dylywn pwyth hun y heneint.	[Noisy are the birds; wet the] valleys; the dead of night is long. Every rarity is admired. I deserve a reward of sleep from old age.
13	Gordyar adar; gwlyb gro. Deil cwydit; divryt divro. Ny wadaf, wyf claf heno.	Noisy are the birds; wet the shingle. Leaves fall; the exile is dispirited. I will not deny I am ill tonight.
14	Gordyar adar; gwlyb traeth. Eglur nwyure; ehalaeth Tonn; gwiw callon rac hiraeth.	Noisy are the birds; wet the shore. Bright the sky; expansive is the wave. The heart is withered because of longing.
15	Gordyar adar; gwlyb traeth. Eglur tonn, tuth ehalaeth. Agret y mabolaeth; Carwn bei kaffwn etwaeth.	Noisy are the birds; wet the shore. bright the wave of expansive movement. That which was loved in boyhood — I would love if I were to get (it) again.
16	Gordyar adar ar edrywy ard. Bann llef cwn yn diffeith. Gordyar adar eilweith.	Noisy are the birds on the highland of Edrywy. High the cry of hounds in the wasteland. Noisy the birds again.
17	Kynnteuin, kein pob amat. Pan vryssyant ketwyr y gat, Mi nyt af; anaf ny'm gat.	Early summer — every growth is fair. When warriors hasten to battle I do not go; an affliction does not permit me.
18	Kynteuin, kein ar ystre. Pan vrys ketwyr y gatle, Mi nyt af: anaf a'm de.	Early summer — fair on the region. When warriors hasten to the battlefield I do not go; my affliction burns me.
19	Llwyt gwarthaf mynyd; breu blaen onn. O ebyr dyhepkyr tonn Peuyr: pell chwerthin o'm kallon.	The top of the hill is washed out; fragile the tip of the ash. From the estuaries a shining wave flows out. Laughter is far from my heart.
20	Assymy hediw penn y mis Yn y westua yd edewis. Crei vym bryt; cryt a'm dewis.	Today for me is the end of a month in the hostel which he has left. My heart is raw, fever ?has seized me.
21	Amlwc golwc gwylyadur. Gwnelit syberwyt segur. Crei vym bryt; cleuyt a'm cur.	Clear is the sight of the water. The idle one performs generosity. My heart is raw; illness wastes me.
22	Alaf yn eil; meil am ved. Nyt eidun detwyd dyhed. Amaerwy adnabot amyned.	Cattle are in the shed; mead is in the bowl. The wise man does not desire discord. The bond of understanding is patience.
23	Alaf yn eil; meil am lat. Llithredawr llyry; llonn cawat. A dwfyn ryt; berwyt bryt brat.	Cattle are in the shed; ale is in the bowl. Slippery are the paths; fierce the shower. ?... the ford. The mind concocts treachery.
24	Berwit brat anuat ober. Bydaut dolur pan burer, Gwerthu bychot yr llawer.	It concocts treachery — an evil deed. There will be grief when it is atoned for: exchanging for a little thing a great one.
25	Pre ator pre ennwir. Pan uarno Douyd, dyd hir, Tywyll vyd geu; goleu gwir.	?.......... wicked. When the Lord judges on the long day the false will be black, the true bright.
26	Kerygyl yn dirch mat; kyrchynyat kewic. Llawen gwyr odywch llat. Crin calaf; alaf yn eiliat.	Cups are ?upraised; the attacker is ?... Men are merry over ale. Whithered [sic] are the stalks; the cattle are in the shed.
27	Kiglei don drom y tholo, Vann y rwng gra[ea]n a gro. Krei vym bryt rac lletvryt heno.	I have heard a heavy-pounding wave, loud between the beach and shingle. My heart is raw because of depression tonight.
28	Osglawc blaen derw; chwerw chweith onn. Chwec evwr; chwerthinat tonn. Ny chel grud kystud callon.	Branching is the tip of the oak; bitter the taste of the ash. Cowparsley is sweet; laughing the wave. The cheek cannot conceal the distress of the heart.
29	Ymwng ucheneit a dyneit arnaf, Yn ol vyg gordyfneit. Ny at Duw da y diryeit.	Frequent is the sigh which ?betrays me according to my wont. God does not allow good for the diriaid.
30	Da y dirieit ny atter, Namyn tristit a phryder. Nyt atwna Duw ar a wnel.	Good to the diriaid may not be allowed, only sorrow and care. God will not undo that which he does.
31	Oed mackwy mab claf; oed goewin gynran Yn llys vre[e]nhin. Poet gwyl Duw wrth edëin.	Despite that which may be done in an oratory diriaid is he who reads it — hated by man here; hated by God above.
32	Or a wneler yn derwdy, Ys tiryeit yr a'e derlly. Cas dyn yman yw cas Duw vry.	The leper was a squire; he was a bold warrior in the court of a king. May God be kind to the outcast.

Note: In the MS, the stanzas appear in the order shown here (in the Welsh). However, it is largely agreed, for stylistic reasons, that their order should be reversed, meaning that 31 ends the poem. This is what has been done in the supplied translation; the English parallel to 31 therefore actually corresponds to the Welsh in 32 and vice versa.

== Editions and translations ==
- Ifor Williams (ed.), Canu Llywarch Hen gyda Rhagmadrodd a Nodiadau (Cardiff: Gwasg Prifysgol Cymru, 1935), pp. 23-27 [2nd edn 1953].
- Jenny Rowland, Early Welsh Saga Poetry: A Study and Edition of the 'Englynion’ (Cambridge: Brewer, 1990) (includes edition pp. 448–52 and translation pp. 497–99)
- Facsimile of National Library of Wales MS 4973B
- Wikisource
