= Kyntaw geir =

Medieval Welsh religious poem

Kyntaw geir (IPA /'kəntau gəir/, named for its first line, 'kyntaw geir a dywedaw', 'the first speech I will utter') is a medieval Welsh englyn-poem. It is a relatively rare example of religious poetry in the englyn form.

== Contents and style ==
In the assessment of Jenny Rowland, 'the narrator-persona displays very human foibles, including the attempt to deny them. This naturalism makes it tempting to view the poem as a personal lyric, but it is undoubtedly misleading. The slightly bumbling, overly sincere narrator of "Kintaw geir" has a shrewd observer of human nature behind him. The incredible impression of spontaneity also conceals art and very tight organization.' The poem opens with the pilgrim preparing himself for his journey and seeking God's protection, perhaps alluding to other journey prayers like the Old English Journey Charm. However, his preparations are disturbed by a sneeze, which seems clearly to have been viewed as a bad omen. In stanzas 4-7 he contemplates the journey to Rome before him and in 8-10 prepares his horse. However, he continues to worry about bad omens, revealing his inner anxiety. The poem closes in 11-13 with the narrator successfully focusing his thoughts on the religious purpose of his journey, with an appropriate escalation in the elaborateness of the verse, closing with a prayer of intercession.

== Text ==
As edited and translated by Jenny Rowland, the poem reads:

Kyntaw geir a dywedaw.
y bore ban kyuodaw.
croes crist in wissc ymdanaw.

Ar helv uy ren y guiscav hetiu.
un trev a glyuaw.
nid ew wy duu nis credaw.

Guiscaw ymdanaw in berth.
ny credaw coel canyd kerth
y gur am creuys e am nerth.

Y mae vimrid ar debed.
arowun ar mor wyned.
etyl butic bytaud ked.

Y mae vimrid ar kighor.
arowun myned. ar mor.
etyl butic bytaud ior.

Dyrcheuid bran y hasgell.
arowun myned. impell.
etyl butic bitaud guell.

Dyrcheuid bran y hadein.
arowun myned ruvein.
etil butic bytaud kein.

Ystarn de wineu fruin guin.
redech hiraethauc raun rin.
ren new. oet reid duu genhin.

Ystarn de wineu birr y blev.
ruit ygniw rygig. otew.
myn yd vo truin. yd uit trev.

Ystarn de wineu hir y neid.
ruit ygynyw rygig. woteid.
ny lut ar lev trev direid.

Trum kyduod daear. tev deil dris.
chuerv vuelin met melis.
ren new ruita de vy neges.

O eissillit guledic. A gueith wtic. wosprid.
a phedir pen pop ieith.
Sanffreid suyna de in imdeith.

Heul eirioled arouned argluit.
crist kely. colowin ked.
dywyccviff wym pechaud am gueithred.

Translation:

The first speech I will utter
in the morning when I arise:
may the cross of Christ be as armour about me.

Under the protection of my lord I will gird myself today—
I hear one sneeze.
It is not my God; I will not believe in it.

I will gird myself finely.
I will not believe in an omen since it is not right.
He who created me will give me strength.

My mind is set on a journey,
seeking to go on the sea.
A beneficial purpose; it will be a blessing.

My mind desires counsel,
seeking to go on the sea.
A beneficial purpose. He is Lord.

A raven raise its wing
desiring to go far.
A beneficial purpose; it will be better.

A raven raises its wing
desiring to go to Rome.
A beneficial purpose; it will be fine.

Saddle the chestnut with the white bridle,
eager to run, with a rough coat.
Lord of Heaven, he would be necessary. May God be with us.

Saddle the short-haired chestnut,
free-moving in hard going, with an ambling course.
Where there's a nose there'll be a sneeze!

Saddle the chestnut with the long leap,
free-moving in hard going, desiring to amble.
An unlucky sneeze will not hinder the brave.

Weighty is the company of the world; thick the leaves of the briars;
bitter is the drinking horn of sweet mead.
Lord of Heaven, make easy my journey.

Offspring of the Ruler, victorious Redeemer,
and Peter head of every nation,
Saint Bridget, bless my journey.

Sun of intercession, Lord of petition,
Christ in Heaven, pillar of boon,
may I atone for my sin by my deed.

== Manuscripts and dating ==
Jenny Rowland judges that Kyntaw geir dates from around the eleventh or maybe the twelfth century. Unlike many early englynion, Kyntaw geir is attested already in the thirteenth-century Black Book of Carmarthen. It is also attested in the late fourteenth-century Red Book of Hergest, and was also in the White Book of Rhydderch. Although it now lost from the White Book due to damage, it attested in two later manuscripts descended from the White Book, Peniarth 111 (made by John Jones of Gellillyfdy in 1607), whose spelling is very close to the White Book's, and London, British Library, Add. MS 31055 (made by Thomas Wiliems in 1596), which is a less conservative copy. National Library of Wales 4973 section b contains the poem. Its relationship to the other manuscripts is complex and may represent a conflation of multiple medieval sources, but it seems to have at least some independent value as a witness to the lost archetype of the poem. It is fairly clear that all these manuscripts descend from a lost common original, to which they are all fairly similar, making the creation of a critical edition of the poems relatively straightforward.

== Editions and translations ==
- Jenny Rowland, Early Welsh Saga Poetry: A Study and Edition of the ‘Englynion’ (Cambridge: Brewer, 1990) (includes edition pp. 452–53 and translations pp. 499–500)
