= Black Book of Carmarthen =

Welsh manuscript

- Peniarth MS 1
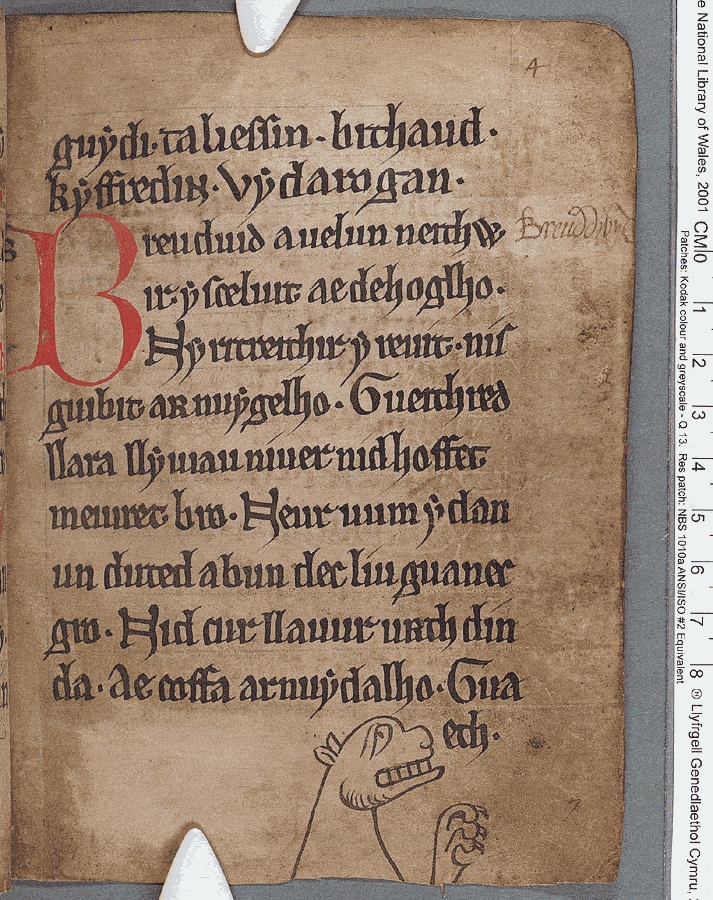
- f.4.r
- Also known as: Llyfr Du Caerfyrddin
- Date: Early to mid 13th century
- Language: Middle Welsh
- Scribe(s): Unknown, believed to be a single scribe
- Material: Vellum
- Size: 54 folios (108 pages)

The Black Book of Carmarthen (Welsh: Llyfr Du Caerfyrddin) is thought to be the earliest surviving manuscript written solely in Welsh. The book dates from the mid-13th century; its name comes from its association with the Priory of St. John the Evangelist and Teulyddog at Carmarthen, and is referred to as black due to the colour of its binding. It is currently part of the collection of the National Library of Wales, where it is catalogued as NLW Peniarth MS 1.

This was one of the collection of manuscripts amassed at the mansion of Hengwrt, near Dolgellau, Gwynedd, by Welsh antiquary Robert Vaughan (c.1592–1667); the collection later passed to the newly established National Library of Wales as the Peniarth or Hengwrt-Peniarth Manuscripts. It is believed that the manuscript is first recorded when it came into the possession of Sir John Price of Brecon (1502?–1555), whose work was to search the monasteries dissolved by Henry VIII. It was given to him by the treasurer of St David's Cathedral, having come from Carmarthen Priory. Llyfr Du Caerfyrddin was described by William Forbes Skene (1809–92) as one of the Four Ancient Books of Wales.

== Description ==
Written before 1250, the manuscript is a small (170 mm × 125 mm; 7 inches × 5 inches), incomplete, vellum codex of 54 folios (108 pages) in eight gatherings; several folios are missing. Although the product of a single scribe, inconsistency in the ruling of each folio, in the number of lines per folio, and in handwriting size and style, suggest an amateur writing over a long period of time. The opening folios, written in a large textura on alternating ruled lines, are followed by folios in a much smaller, cramped script.

=== Contents ===
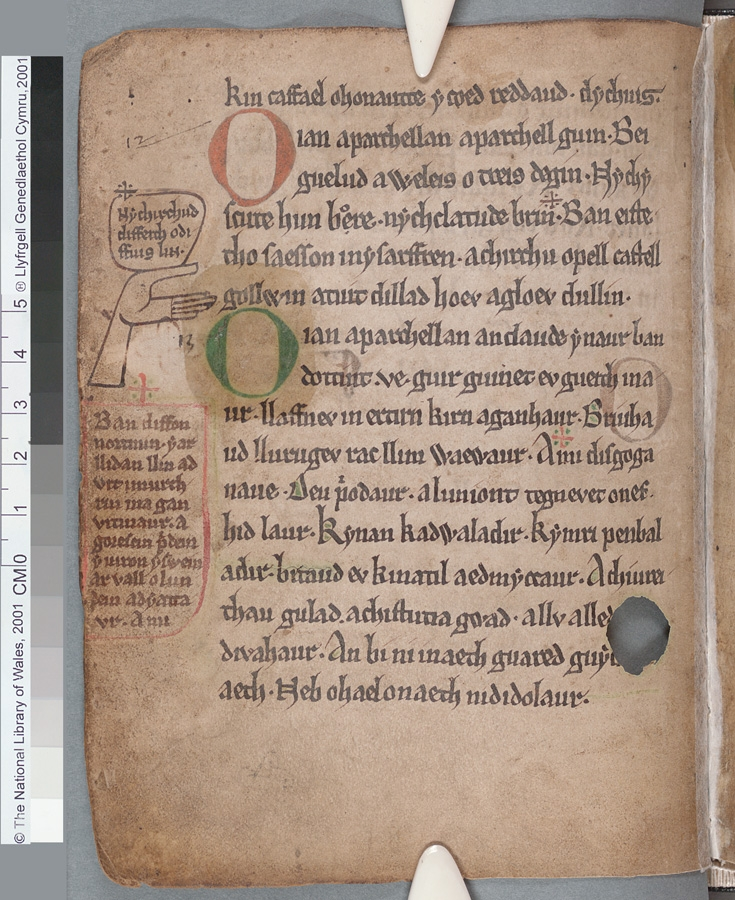
Black Book of Carmarthen (f.29.v)

The book contains a small group of triads about the horses of Welsh heroes, but is chiefly a collection of 9th–12th-century poetry falling into various categories: religious and secular subjects, and odes of praise and of mourning. Of greater interest are the poems which draw on traditions relating to the Welsh heroes associated with the Hen Ogledd (Old North, i.e. Cumbria and the surrounding area), and especially those connected with the legend of Arthur and Myrddin, known in later non-Welsh tradition as Merlin, thus predating the descriptions of Merlin by Geoffrey of Monmouth. One of the poems, The Elegy of Gereint son of Erbin, refers to the "Battle of Llongborth", the location of which can no longer be pinpointed, and mentions Arthur's involvement in the battle.

The poems Yr Afallennau and Yr Oianau describe the mad Merlin in a forest talking to an apple tree and a pig, prophesying the success or failure of the Welsh army in battles with the Normans in south Wales.

Some of the other poems contained are:

- Ymddiddan Myrddin a Thaliesin (A Conversation Between Merlin and Taliesin)
- Dadl y Corff a'r Enaid (Dialogue between the Body and the Soul)
- Elegy to Madog ap Maredudd (d. 1160)
- The Elegy of Gereint son of Erbin
- The Verses of the Graves
- Kyntaw geir (a penitential poem on pilgrimage)
- Gwerz Skolan

== Recent developments ==
In 2002, it was announced that the Black Book had been scanned, and made available online.

In 2014 it was suggested an interactive display about the book could be created in Carmarthen's St Peter's Church.

In March 2015, University of Cambridge Professor Paul Russell and Ph.D. student Myriah Williams reported that a variety of imaging techniques such as ultraviolet lamps and photo-editing software had revealed content that had been invisible under normal viewing conditions. Among the previously unknown material, erased half a millennium ago, were extensive marginal annotations, including an inscription suggesting that the book was gifted by a previous owner to a family member; drawings of a fish and of two human faces; and a previously unattested Welsh poem.
