= David Owen (Dewi Wyn o Eifion) =

Welsh poet and farmer (1784–1841)

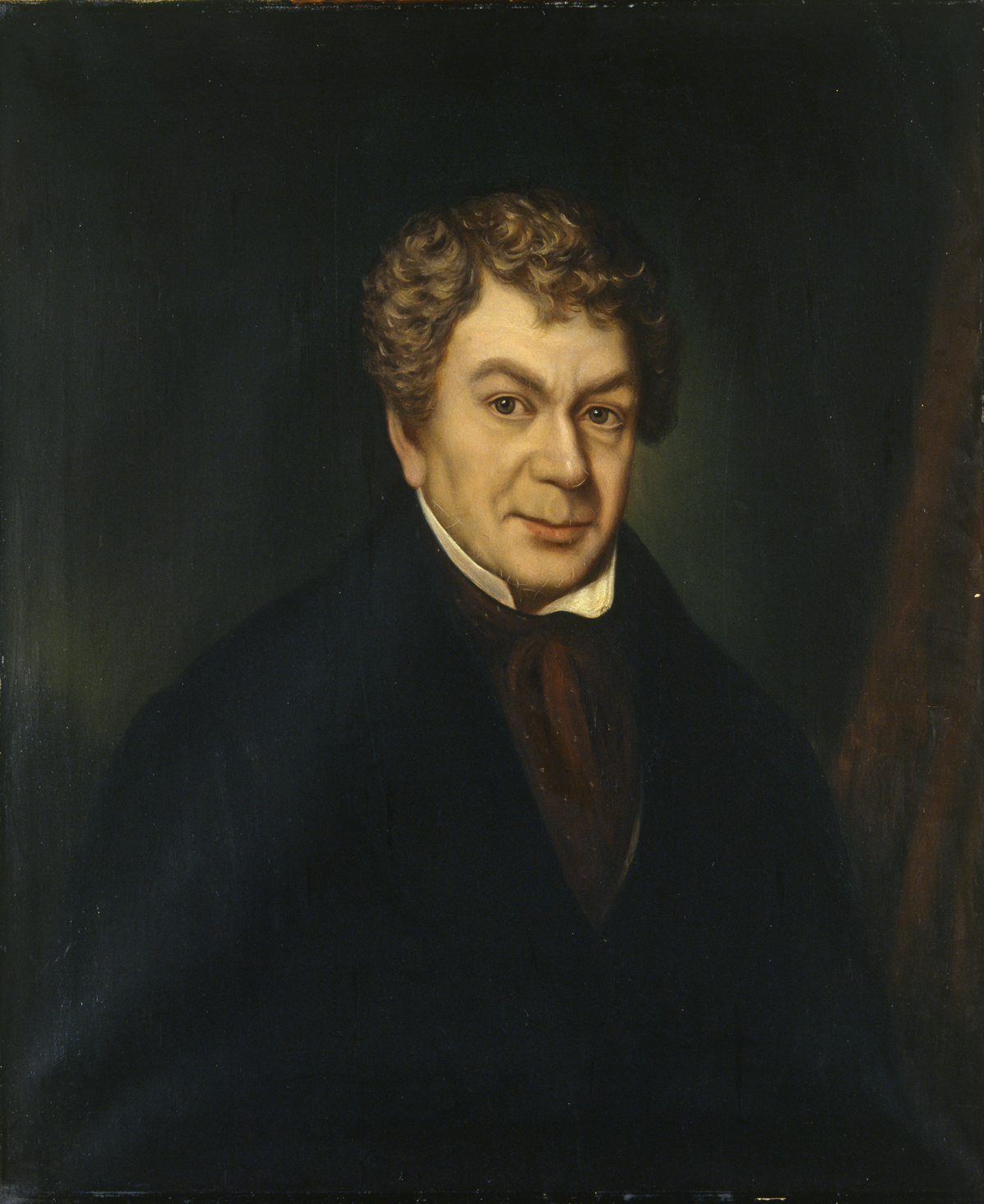
David Owen, painted by William Roos, National Museum of Wales

David Owen (Dewi Wyn o Eifion) (1784 Llanystumdwy, Caernarfonshire – 17 January 1841) was a Welsh poet and farmer. He is noted especially for his work in two traditional Welsh verse forms: the awdl and the englyn.

== Conversion ==
A dispute over an award, between him and members of the Gwyneddigion Society, led to him largely giving up poetry in 1823, although he did resume it in 1832. He had long been drawn to the Baptist faith and converted to it a year before he died.
