= Llywarch Hen =

Prince of the Brythonic kingdom of Rheged

- Born: c. 534; Rheged
- Died: c. 608 (aged 74)
- Occupation: Poet
- Children: 24 to 39 sons, and a few daughters
- Father: Elidurus

Llywarch Hen (Welsh: [ˈɬəwarχ ˈheːn], "Llywarch the Old"; c. 534 – c. 608), was a prince and poet of the Brythonic kingdom of Rheged, a ruling family in the Hen Ogledd or "Old North" of Britain (modern southern Scotland and northern England). Along with Taliesin, Aneirin, and Myrddin, he is held to be one of the four great bards of early Welsh poetry. Whether he actually wrote the poems attributed to him is unknown, and most of what is known about his life is derived from early medieval poems which may or may not be historically accurate.

== Life ==
Llywarch Hen was the son of Elidurus, chief of Argoed (in the Rheged region, later Cumberland). In the genealogy known as "Bonedd Gwŷr y Gogledd (The Descent of the Men of the North)" he is listed as a descendant of Coel Hen (King Cole), and is first cousin to King Urien Rheged. It is thought that he may have been a monarch himself, with Urien ruling northern Rheged, and Llywarch ruling the south. In his 1953 book The Derbyshire Dales, Norman Price links Llywarch to Carl Wark near Sheffield.

In his youth, he is said to have fought by the side of the brave Gereint at the Battle of Llongborth. After the battle, he attached himself to the court of Urien, where he "lived bravely, clothed himself sumptuously, did not spare the ale and mead, and was blessed with 24 sons." These sons are mentioned in the poem Canu Llywarch Hen, although various sources list as many as thirty-nine, plus a few daughters.

After the fall of Urien, Llywarch was given the task of returning to Rheged with Urien's severed head. The kingdom fell to Urien's son Owain, who was slain at the Battle of Catraeth, along with almost the entire host of Britons, including all of Llywarch's sons. His friends and family all dead, he is advised to flee to the court of Cynddylan in the Kingdom of Powys. When Cynddylan was slain in battle, Llywarch was left friendless and destitute, with nothing but the milk from a single cow to support him. According to legend, he lived in a hut at Aber-Ciog (now called Dol-Giog), alone with his harp, composing his poems (which would have been sung). At this point, a monk associated with Llanfor in Meirionydd, near Llyn Tegid in Gwynedd, is said to have taken pity on him, converted him, and witnessed his happy death. Near this site, there is a mound known as Pabell Llywarch (Llywarch's Tent), and further south lies Clawdd Llywarch Hen (Llywarch Hen's Dyke).

The Bonedd lists his date of birth as c. 534, and his death as c. 608, so he would have been around 80 years old at the time of his death, in keeping with his epithet of Llywarch "the old". However, some sources list different birth and death dates, with claims of his age reaching 105, or even 150 years.

== Descendants ==
Merfyn Frych, who became king of Gwynedd c. 825, established a new dynasty. He was the first king of Gwynedd not to claim descent from Cunedda, instead he claimed to be a direct descendant of Llywarch Hen.

== Works ==
His life was the subject of a presumed lost saga of which only the poetry, a series of englynion, survives, known as Canu Llywarch Hen. The words are put into the mouth of Llywarch himself, although they were clearly composed somewhat later, possibly between about 800 and 900. These may have been passed down orally before being written down at a much later date. The Canu Heledd, concerning the fall of the kings of the Pengwern region, and the elegy Geraint son of Erbin, concerning the Battle of Llongborth, are also associated indirectly with Llywarch.

Works attributed to him include:

- Let the Cock's Comb Be Red
- Usual is the Wind
- the Calends of Winter
- Entangling is the Snare
- Bright are the Ash Tops
- Sitting High Upon a Hill
- I Was Formerly Fair of Limb
- The Death of Urien
- Maenwyn, When I Was Your Age
- Geraint son of Erbin
