= Canu Llywarch Hen =

Collection of early Welsh englyn-poems

Canu Llywarch Hen (Welsh for 'the songs of Llywarch Hen', Modern Welsh pronunciation: ['kani 'ɬəwarχ heːn]) are a collection of early Welsh englyn-poems. They comprise the most famous of the early Welsh cycles of englynion about heroes of post-Roman North Britain.

== Contents and themes ==
As edited by Jenny Rowland, the contents of Canu Llywarch Hen are as follows:

Title	Summary
Gwên and Llywarch	The elderly Llywarch incites his son Gwên to fight.
Marwnad Gwên	Llywarch laments the death of Gwên.
Pyll	Llywarch praises his dead son Pyll.
Maen	Llywarch incites his son Maen.
Miscellaneous stanzas about Llywarch's sons	These stanzas mention a large range of sons.
Enwev meibon llywarch hen	Llywarch laments his lost sons.
Gwahodd Llywarch i Lanfawr	Llywarch laments the burden of ruling without his sons.
Cân yr Henwr	Llywarch laments his old age.

The poems contemplate martial, masculine culture, fate, and old age from a critical standpoint. As with the other so-called 'saga englynion’ (pre-eminently Canu Urien and Canu Heledd), there is considerable uncertainty and debate as to how the poems of Canu Llywarch might originally have been performed. It is usually assumed that they must have been accompanied by some kind of prose narrative, to which they provided emotional depth; but this is not certain.

In all the independent witnesses bar NLW 4973a, the Llywarch Hen poems are preceded by the englyn-poem Claf Abercuawg, which in the White Book is entitled 'Englynion Mabclaf ap Llywarch' (‘englynion of Mabclaf son of Llywarch’). However, modern scholars do not see it as originally linked to the Llywarch Hen material.

== Manuscripts and dating ==
The poems are attested principally in the late fourteenth-century Red Book of Hergest. They were also included in the White Book of Rhydderch, but are now lost due to damage to the manuscript. However, they are attested in two later manuscripts descended from the White Book, Peniarth 111 (made by John Jones of Gellillyfdy in 1607), whose spelling is very close to the White Book's, and London, British Library, Add. MS 31055 (made by Thomas Wiliems in 1596), which is a less conservative copy. Some other late copies of lost medieval manuscripts of the englynion also exist: National Library of Wales 4973 contains two copies of the cycle, both copied by Dr John Davies of Mallwyd, one of Wales's leading antiquarians and scribes of his day, before 1631. The first copy, NLW 4973a, derives from a lost manuscript closer to the White Book than the Red. The second copy, NLW 4973b, is more complex and may represent a conflation of multiple medieval sources, but seems to have at least some independent value as a witness to the lost archetype of the poems. It is fairly clear that all these manuscripts descend from a lost common original, to which they are all fairly similar, making the creation of a critical edition of the poems relatively straightforward.

Despite surviving first in fourteenth-century manuscripts and in largely Middle Welsh orthography, the poems are thought mostly to have been composed in Old Welsh and transmitted orally and/or in manuscript, due to their archaic style and occasionally archaic spelling. Jenny Rowland judges that the two poems to Llywarch's son Gwên ('Gwên' and 'Marwnad Gwên') belong among the earliest stratum of saga-englynion, of the late eighth to the mid-ninth century, whereas some of the poems to his other sons are 'very late' (perhaps the twelfth century).

== Historicity ==
Llywarch Hen himself may have been a historical figure—he appears in early Welsh royal genealogies, which situate him in sixth-century north Britain as a cousin of Urien Rheged (the subject of the stylistically similar Canu Urien). However, Canu Llywarch Hen associate Llywarch with Powys in Wales, and it is generally accepted that his story was relocated there by later tradition. It is not unlikely that the poetry of Canu Llywarch Hen was gradually built up from nothing more than these sparse genealogical references, with Llywarch's characterisation as an old man inspired by his epithet.

== Example: 'Gwên and Llywarch' ==
An example of the Canu Llyrwarch Hen is the poem entitled 'Gwên and Llywarch' by Rowland:

Teneu fy ysgwyd ar asswy fy nhu
cy bwyf hen as gallaf
ar rodwydd forlas gwiliaf

Na wisc wedy kwyn. na vit vrwyn dy vryt.
llem awel chwerw gwenwyn.
amgyhud vy mam mab yt wyf.

Neut atwen ar vy awen
yn hanuot. o un achen.
trigwyd oric elwic a wen.

Llym vym par llachar ygryt
armaaf y wylyaw. ryt
kynnyt anghwyf duw gennyt.

O diegyd ath welif
oth ryledir ath gwynif.
na choll wyneb [gwr] ar gnif.

Ny chollaf dy wyneb trin wosep wr
pan wisc glew yr ystre.
porthaf gnif kynn mudif lle.

Redegawc tonn ar hyt traeth.
ech adaf torrif aruaeth.
kat [agdo] gnawt ffo ar ffraeth.

Yssit ym a lauarwyf.
briwaw pelydyr parth y bwyf.
ny lauaraf na ffowyf.

Medal migned kalet riw.
rac carn cann tal glann a vriw.
edewit ny wnelher ny diw.

Gwasgarawt neint am glawd caer.
a minneu armaaf.
ysgwyt [brwyt] briw. kynn techaf.

Y corn ath rodes di vryen.
ae arwest eur am y en.
chwyth yndaw oth daw aghen.

Yr ergryt aghen rac angwyr lloegyr
ny lygraf vym mawred.
ny duhunaf rianed.

Tra vum .i. yn oet y gwas draw.
a wisc o eur y ottoew
bydei re ruthrwn y waew.

Diheu diweir dy waes.
ti yn vyw ath dyst ry las.
ny bu eidyl hen yn was.

Translation:

Thin is my shield on my left side.
Although I may be old, I can do it:
I will keep watch at Rhodwydd Forlas.

Do not arm after dinner; let your thoughts not be heavy.
Sharp is the wind; bad feeling is hurtful.
My mother tells me that I am your son.

I know in my heart
that we spring from one stock.
You are tarrying a precious while, Gwên.

Sharp is my spear, bright in battle.
I intend to keep watching on the ford.
Although I may not escape, God be with you.

If you escape, I will see you.
If you are killed, I will lament you.
Do not lose the honour of a warrior despite battle hardship.

I will not lose your honour, battle-ready man,
when warriors arm for the border.
I will suffer hardship before I will yield ground.

Running is a wave along the beach;
soon intentions break —
?a scant protection in battle — frequent is fleeing by big talkers.

I have that which I speak about.
There will be breaking of shields where I am.
I will not say that I will not flee.

Soft is the swampy ground: firm the slope.
The edge of a bank gives way beneath the hoof of a white steed.
A promise which is not fulfilled is useless.

Waves spread out around the bank of a fortress,
and I intend
that there will be a broken, shattered shield before I retreat.

The horn which Urien gave you
with its band of gold around its mouthpiece —
blow on it if you come to have need.

Despite battle-horrow before the warriors of England
I will not mar my greatness.
I will not awaken maidens.

When I was the age of the youth over there
who wears his spurs of gold
it would be swiftly that I rushed to the spear.

Certainly your assertion is true:
you are alive and your witness slain.
No old man was a weakling in youth.

== Editions and translations ==
- Ifor Williams (ed.), Canu Llywarch Hen gyda Rhagmadrodd a Nodiadau (Cardiff: Gwasg Prifysgol Cymru, 1935) [2nd edn 1953].
- Jenny Rowland, Early Welsh Saga Poetry: A Study and Edition of the 'Englynion’ (Cambridge: Brewer, 1990) (includes editions pp. 404–18 and translations pp. 468–76)
- Patrick Ford (trans.), 'The Poetry of Llywarch Hen', in The Celtic Heroic Age: Literary Sources for Ancient Celtic Europe and Early Ireland and Wales, ed. by John T Koch and John Carey, Celtic Studies Publications, 1 (Aberystwyth: Celtic Studies Publications, 2003), pp. 385–404 (translations)
- Jenny Rowland, (ed.) A Selection of Early Welsh Saga Poems (London: Modern Humanities Research Association, 2014) (selected texts)
