= Enclosed rhyme =

Enclosed rhyme (or enclosing rhyme) is the rhyme scheme ABBA (that is, where the first and fourth lines, and the second and third lines rhyme). Enclosed-rhyme quatrains are used in introverted quatrains, as in the first two stanzas of Petrarchan sonnets.

== Example ==
How soon hath Time, the subtle thief of youth,	$\mathrm{A}$
Stolen on his wing my three and twentieth year!	$\mathrm{B}$
My hasting days fly on with full career	$\mathrm{B}$
But my late spring no bud or blossom shew'th.	$\mathrm{A}$

(From John Milton: "Sonnet VII")

"Exposure", by Wilfred Owen, also has an example of enclosed rhyme. Each of the eight stanzas have the ABBA half rhyming sequence:

Our brains ache in the merciless iced east winds that knive us ...	$\mathrm{A}$
Wearied we keep awake because the night is silent ...	$\mathrm{B}$
Low, drooping flares confuse our memories of the salient ...	$\mathrm{B}$
Worried by silence, sentries whisper, curious, nervous,	$\mathrm{A}$
But nothing happens.

== See also ==
- Rhyme scheme
