= Quatrain =

Four-line poem or stanza

A quatrain is a type of stanza, or a complete poem, consisting of four lines.

Existing in a variety of forms, the quatrain appears in poems from the poetic traditions of various ancient civilizations including Persia, Ancient India, Ancient Greece, Ancient Rome, and China, and continues into the 21st century, where it is seen in works published in many languages.

This form of poetry has been continually popular in Iran since the medieval period, as Ruba'is form; an important faction of the vast repertoire of Persian poetry, with famous poets such as Omar Khayyam and Mahsati Ganjavi of Seljuk Persia writing poetry only in this format.

Michel de Nostredame (Nostradamus) used the quatrain form to deliver his famous "prophecies" in the 16th century.

There are fifteen possible rhyme schemes, but the most traditional and common are ABAA, AAAA, ABAB, and ABBA.

== Forms ==
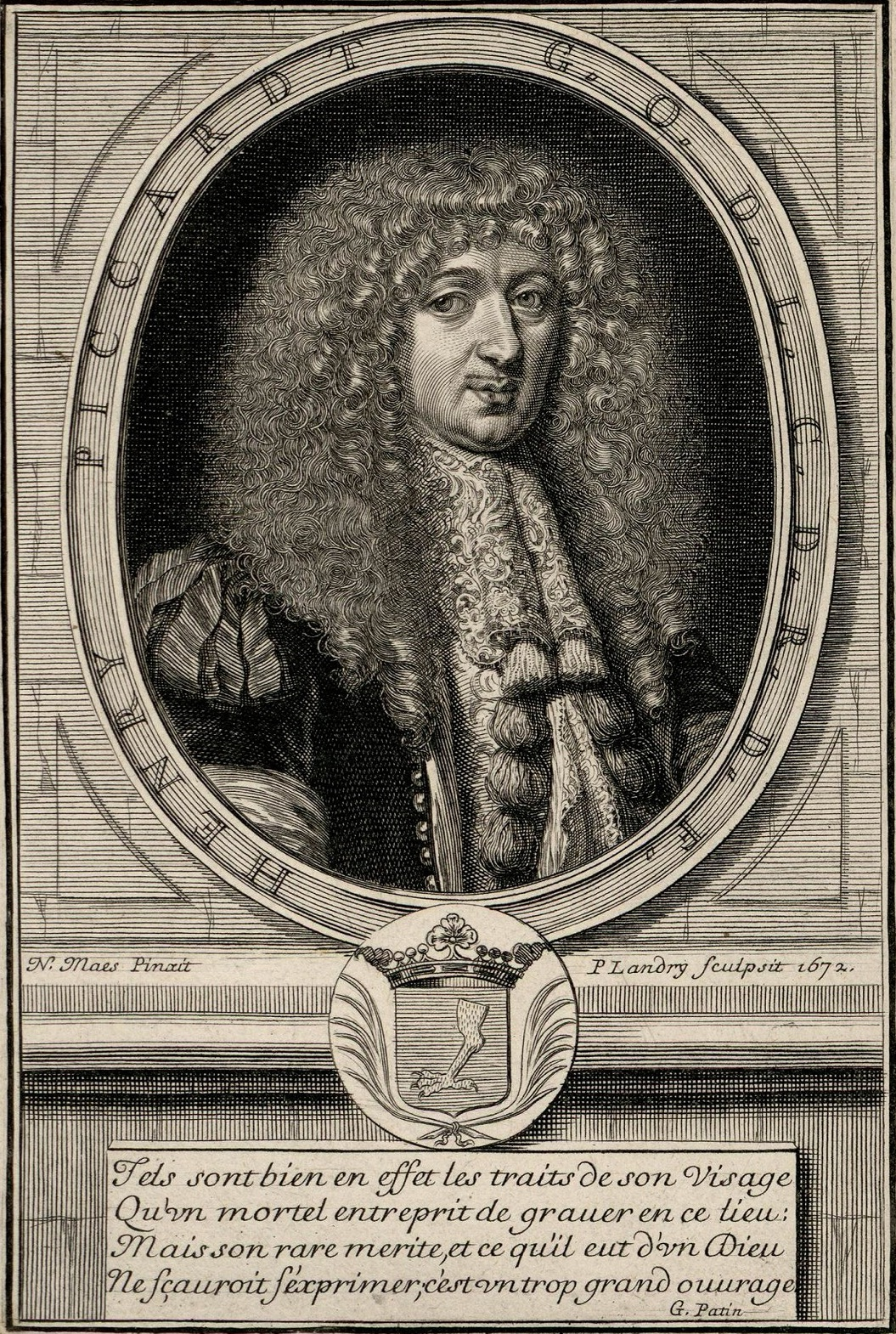
Portrait of Henric Piccardt. Engraving by Pierre Landry from 1672 after a lost painting by Nicolaes Maes. Under the portrait, a quatrain by Guy Patin.

- The heroic stanza or elegiac stanza consists of the iambic pentameter, with the rhyme scheme of $\mathrm{ABAB}$.

An example can be found in the following of Thomas Gray's "Elegy Written in a Country Churchyard".

The curfew tolls the knell of parting day,
The lowing herd wind slowly o'er the lea,
The plowman homeward plods his weary way,
And leaves the world to darkness and to me.

- The hymnal stanza consists of alternating rhymes with the iambic trimeter and the iambic tetrameter, with a rhyme scheme of $\mathrm{ABCB}$.

An example can be found in Robert Burns, "A Red, Red Rose".

O, my luve's like a red, red rose,
That's newly sprung in June;
O, my luve's like the melodie
That's sweetly played in tune.

- The memoriam stanza consists of the iambic tetrameter and a rhyme scheme of $\mathrm{ABBA}$.

An example can be found in Alfred Lord Tennyson's "In Memoriam A.H.H.".

So word by word, and line by line,
The dead man touch'd me from the past,
And all at once it seem'd at last
The living soul was flash'd on mine.

- An envelope stanza is a stanza that starts and ends a poem with little change of wording, although this term is also used on stanzas that have a symmetrical rhyme scheme of $\mathrm{ABBA}$.

An example can be found in William Blake's "The Tyger". (These are the first and last stanzas of the poem)

Tyger Tyger, burning bright,
In the forests of the night;
What immortal hand or eye,
Could frame thy fearful symmetry?
...
Tyger Tyger burning bright,
In the forests of the night:
What immortal hand or eye,
Dare frame thy fearful symmetry

- The ballad stanza consists of the iambic tetrameter with a rhyme scheme of $\mathrm{ABCB}$ (see ballad stanza for more details).

An example can be found in "La Belle Dame sans Merci" by John Keats.

I saw pale kings and princes too,
Pale warriors, death-pale were they all;
They cried—'La Belle Dame sans Merci
Thee hath in thrall!'

- The Ruba'i form of rhymed quatrain was favored by Persian-language poet Omar Khayyám, among others. This work was a major inspiration for Edward FitzGerald's Rubaiyat of Omar Khayyam. The ruba'i was a particularly widespread verse form: the form rubaiyat reflects the plural. One of FitzGerald's verses may serve to illustrate:

Come, fill the Cup, and in the fire of Spring
Your Winter garment of Repentance fling:
The Bird of Time has but a little way
To flutter—and the Bird is on the Wing.

== See also ==
- Bell number
- Combination
- Enclosed rhyme
- Jueju (Chinese quatrain)
- Rhyme scheme
