= Trova (poetry) =

Trova is a traditional form of poem in four verses, composed by seven syllables, common in Brazil and Portugal, being a staple of popular literature. According to the poet Luiz Otávio, a "trova" is:

Poetic composition in four verses, seven syllables each one, with at least the second and fourth rhyming.

It's a popular literary creation, that speaks most directly with the people's hearth.

It's through the Trova that the people takes knowledge of the poetry and feel its strength. That's the reason why the Trova and the Trovador are immortals.

Fernando Pessoa considers "trova is the flower vase that people puts in the window of their soul."

Example of trova by Luiz Otávio:

Às vezes o mar bravio
dá-nos lição engenhosa:
afunda um grande navio,
deixa boiar uma rosa!

Sometimes the rambunctious sea
gives us an ingenious lesson:
it sinks a great vessel,

only to float a blossom!

== Structure ==
Trova is a poem composed by four verses, each containing seven syllables, without a title, self-enclosed in its own verses. The Trova are usually related to popular culture, and figured heavily on the popularization of literature in Brazil, being recognized as a popular art form, and is subject to several contests in Brazil.

== History ==
Although the Trova is currently a lusophone form of literature, it has its origins in the Medieval Era, where it was used to refer to any form of popular music or verse. From the south of France, the Trova expanded, reaching Portugal, and, eventually, Brazil, where it became a popular form of poetry.
