= Englyn =

Traditional Welsh short poem form

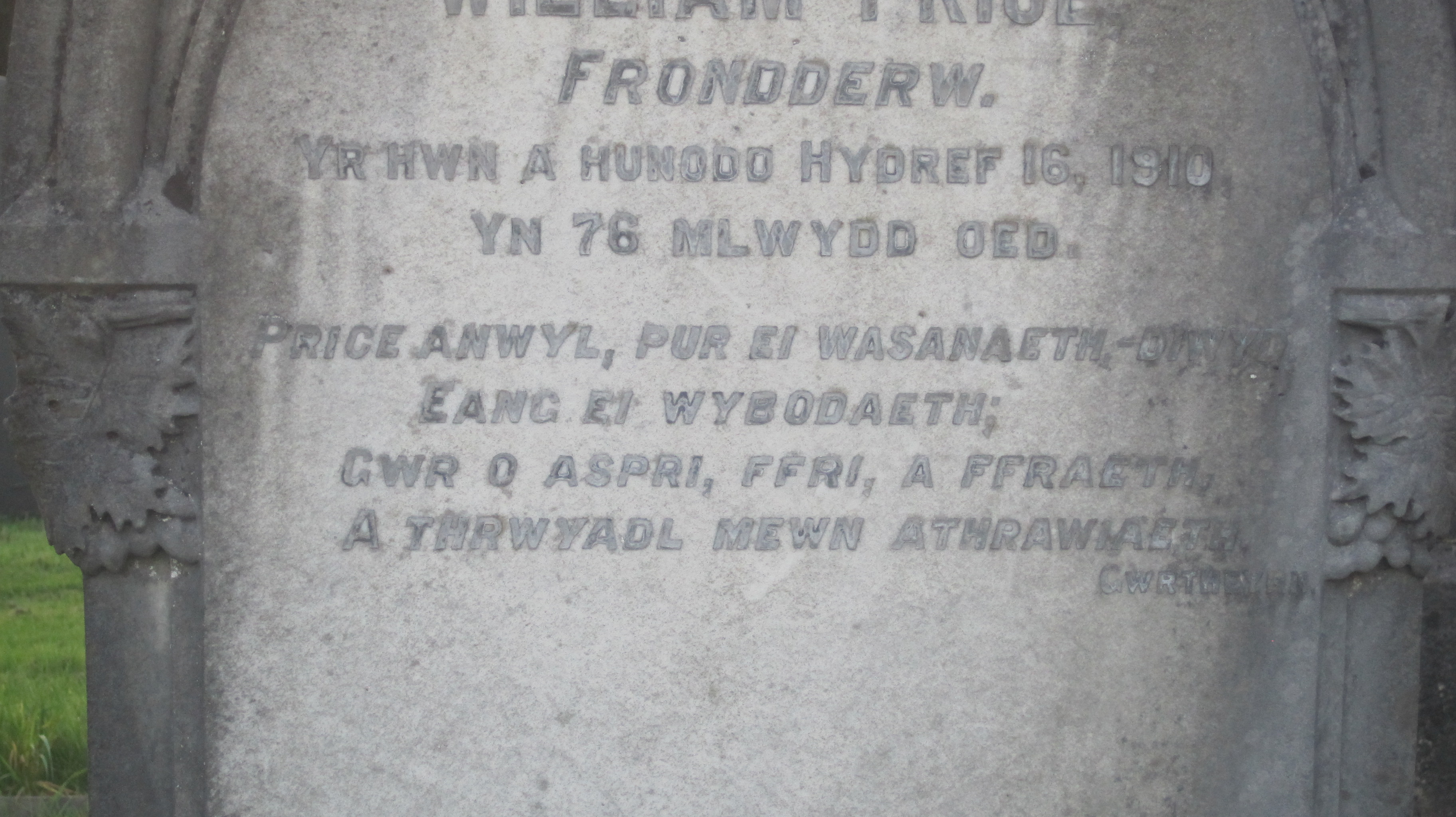
An englyn on a gravestone in Christ Church, Bala: Price anwyl, pur ei wasanaeth–diwyd Eang ei wybodaeth; Gwr o aspri, ffri a ffraeth, A thrwyadl mewn athrawiaeth. Dear Price, pure in his diligent service Wide in his knowledge; A man acerbic, fearless and fluent, And thorough in doctrine.

Englyn (pronounced [ˈɛŋ.lɪn]; plural englynion) is a traditional Welsh short poem form, consisting of a stanza of either three or four lines. The metre involves the counting of syllables, and rigid patterns of rhyme and half rhyme. Many lines contain a repeating pattern of consonants and accent known as cynghanedd.

An englyn can be used as a poem in its own right, for example as an epitaph, or used in a series as part of a longer poem. Sometimes different types of englyn are mixed in the same poem.

The three-line englyn was common in early Welsh poetry, but about the 12th century it went out of fashion, to be replaced completely by four-line varieties.

The most common type of englyn is the four-line englyn unodl union, which is usually referred to simply as an englyn.

== Early history ==
The englyn is found in the work of the earliest attested Welsh poets (the cynfeirdd), where the main types are the three-line englyn milwr and englyn penfyr. It is the only set stanzaic metre found in the early Welsh poetic corpus, and explanations for its origins have tended to focus on stanzaic Latin poetry and hymns; however, it is as likely to be a development within the Brittonic poetic tradition. Whereas the metrical rules of later englynion are clear (and are based on counting syllables), the precise metre of the early englynion is debated and could have involved stress-counting. The earliest englynion are found as marginalia written in a tenth-century hand in the Juvencus Manuscript.

Many early englynion seem to represent moments of characters' emotional reflection in stories now lost: Canu Llywarch Hen, Canu Urien, Canu Heledd. Others survey heroic tradition, for example the Englynion y Beddau or Geraint son of Erbin, and other poems written using englynion are lyric, religious meditations and laments such as the famous Claf Abercuawg and Kyntaw geir.

In the 14th century the various metres used in Welsh poetry were classified into 24 different types; the classification is thought to be due to Einion Offeiriad and Dafydd Ddu o Hiraddug. In Einion's grammar, the metres are divided into three groups: Englynion, Cywyddau and Awdlau. The first group contained eight types of englyn: Penfyr, Milwr, Unodl union, Unodl crwca, Cyrch, Proest dalgron, Lleddfbroest and Proest gadwynog. In the 15th century Dafydd ab Edmwnd revised the list, excluding the three-lined Penfyr and Milwr, which had become obsolete. These three-line englynion are sometimes referred to as englynion o'r hen ganiad ("englyns of the old poetry").

== Three-line englynion ==
=== Englyn penfyr ===
Englyn penfyr literally means "the short-ended englyn", since in it a 16-syllable opening couplet is followed by a line of only 7 syllables. The first line has ten syllables, divided five + five.

In its usual form, the first couplet of the englyn penfyr is a toddaid byr, with the main rhyme in line 1 coming on the 7th, 8th, or 9th syllable. The part of line 1 after the rhyme, which is known as the gair cyrch and is usually separated from it in writing by a dash, is linked to the first half of line 2 either by consonance or by rhyme.

The following englyn penfyr is part of a longer poem called Canu Heledd. In this poem a princess, Heledd, sings a lament for her brother, Cynddylan, a prince of the Kingdom of Powys, who died fighting the English in the 7th century A.D. Cynddylan's hall was located in Pengwern, a place believed to be in what is now Shropshire. The poem is dated to the 9th century A.D.

Stafell Gynddylan / neud athwyd––heb wedd
Mae ym medd / dy ysgwyd
Hyd tra fu, / ni bu dollglwyd.

("Cynddylan's hall, you have become formless.
Your shield (i.e. protector) is in the grave.
While he was alive, there was no tollgate.")

The following englyn penfyr has only five syllables in the second line. The first and third lines have cynghanedd sain with two internal rhymes.

Oer gwely pysgawd / yng nghysgawd––iäen;
Cul hydd, cawn / barfawd;
Byr diwedydd, / gwŷdd gwyrawd.

("Cold is the bed of the fish in the shadow of ice;
Lean is the stag, the reeds are bearded (with frost);
Short is the afternoon, trees are bowing.")

Another early form of the englyn penfyr also had lines of 10, 6, and 7 syllables, but had rhyme between the middle and end of the first line instead of a toddaid. In this verse, in which garhirion and grawn echo the consonants of Gereint:

Oedd re ryereint / dan forddwyd Gereint
Garhirion, grawn a'e bu:
Rhuddion rhuthr eryron du.

("Swift runners were they under the thigh of Geraint,
Long-legged, fed on grain:
Red ones, with the onslaught of black eagles.")

=== Englyn byr crwca ===
The "crooked short englyn". This is like englyn penfyr, but orders the lines differently: seven syllables in the first, ten syllables (in two groups of five) in the second, and five to six syllables in the third:

Ton trá-thon / tó-id tu tír;
Goruchel gwaeddau / rhag bron bannau––bre;
Braidd allan orsefir.

("Wave after wave breaks over the land;
Loud cries before the mountain peaks;
Scarcely can one stand outside.")

In some englynion of this type, instead of cynghanedd gyrch, there is a triple rhyme as follows:

Penn a borthaf / tu morddwyd
Oedd ysgwyd ar 'i wlad, / oedd olwyn yng nghad,
Cleddyf cad, / cywlad rwyd

("I carry a head alongside my thigh.
He was a shield over the country, he was a wheel in battle,
he was a sword in war, a snare of the enemy.")

Morris-Jones calls a couplet with a triple rhyme like this a treaeanog.

=== Englyn cil-dwrn ===
The "englyn of the cupped hand". After the first two lines of ten and six syllables, as in an englyn unodl union, there is just one more line of two, three or four syllables, which follows the rhyme of the first two lines. This metre is rarely used. The following example comes from a 16th-century grammar book:

Hybarch yw mab y marchog––yn aur (L)
Yn arian golerog (Cy)
Torchog

("Honoured is a son of the knight, gold
and silver-collared,
torc-wearing.")

The above example has cynghanedd lusg in line 1, and cynghanedd gyrch linking lines 1 and 2.

According to John Morris-Jones, this metre is no more than a joke. It is not one of the ancient measures of Welsh poetry.

=== Englyn milwr ===
The "soldier's englyn". This consists of three seven-syllable lines. All three lines rhyme. The following is found in a 13th-century manuscript, but may be earlier:

Otid eiry, / gwyn y cnes;
Nid â cedwyr / i'w neges;
Oer llynnau, / eu lliw heb des.

("Snow falls, white is the skin (of the ground);
Warriors do not go on their errand;
Cold are the lakes, their color without warmth.")

There is usually a caesura after the third or fourth syllable, as shown above.

The englyn milwr can also sometimes be made using proest (half-rhyme) instead of rhyme.

=== Englynion y Clywaid ===
The three-line englynion of the poem Englynion y Clywaid are similar, but in a slightly different metre, in that the first line of each stanza has eight (sometimes nine) syllables, and the 2nd and 3rd usually have seven (but sometimes six or eight) syllables. For example (in modern spelling):

A glywaist ti a gânt Llywarch?
Oedd henwr drud dihafarch;
Onid cyfarwydd, cyfarch.

("Have you heard what Llywarch sang?
He was a valiant, courageous old man.
Unless one is knowledgeable, one should ask.")

In this poem, as well as the irregular line-lengths, the caesura is also sometimes irregularly placed, as in the third line above.

== Four-line englynion ==
=== Englyn unodl union ===
The "straight one-rhymed englyn", Welsh pronunciation: ['ɛŋlɨn 'ɨnɔdl 'ɨnjɔn], is identical to englyn penfyr except that it adds a fourth seven-syllable line at the end. Thus it consists of four lines of ten, six, seven and seven syllables, all with the same rhyme. The seventh, eighth or ninth syllable of the first line introduces the rhyme and this is repeated on the last syllable of the other three lines. The part of the first line after the rhyme is known as the gair cyrch Welsh pronunciation: [gaɨ̯r 'kɨrχ], which can be one, two, or three syllables long. This alliterates or rhymes with a word or words in the first part of the second line.

This is the most common kind of englyn. The first two lines, which are in the form of a toddaid byr, are known as the paladr ("shaft (of an arrow)"), while the third and fourth, which are identical to a couplet in the cywydd deuair hirion metre, are known as the esgyll ("wings (or feathers)").

This is an englyn unodl union by Alan Llwyd, written in honour of the Welsh nationalist poet R. S. Thomas:

Ym Mhorth oer / y Merthyron––y merthyr (C)
Mwya'i werth / o ddigon (Cy)
A hir-fawrhá / y fro hon (T + C)
Wr dewr o Aberdaron (T)

("In the cold Port of the Martyrs —the martyr
Of by far the greatest worth,
And whom this region will long celebrate,
A brave man from Aberdaron.")

Each line of the above englyn is decorated with traditional cynghanedd, including cynghanedd gyrch linking the gair cyrch at the end of line one with the phrase mywa'i werth at the beginning of line 2. (C) = cynghanedd groes, (Cy) = cynghanedd gyrch, (T) = cynghanedd draws. The cynghanedd in the third line is complex, since it combines two types.

The dash after the rhyme in line 1 does not necessarily represent a break in syntax, but is simply a metrical mark which is customarily used before a gair cyrch.

In the great majority of examples of englyn unodl union, the gair cyrch is linked to a word in line 2 by consonantal cynghanedd rather than rhyme. If so, the end of the second line has no cynghanedd. Occasionally, however, the gair cyrch is linked to the second line by rhyme. If so, the second line must have cynghanedd groes or cynghanedd sain throughout, so that the gair cyrch and the second line together make an extended cynghanedd sain. In his poem of ten englynion listing ten virtues of his patron Ifor ap Llewelyn, only two have rhyme, including the tenth:

O wychder, fy nêr un arial––â Ffwg, (S)
Morgannwg / mawr gynnal, (C)
Ofer dyn, / fwriad anial, (C)
Ofer deg / wrth Ifor dal. (T)

("In splendour, my lord of the same spirit as Fulk,
Glamorgan's great support,
a man is worthless, futile intent,
ten are worthless compared to tall Ifor.")

(S) = cynghanedd sain, (C) = cynghanedd groes, (T) = cynghanedd draws.

The following englyn is by the 12th-century Welsh poet Cynddelw Brydydd Mawr. It describes the mighty sound of the war-horn of Llewelyn the Great. In this early example there is no consonance or rhyme between the end of line 1 and the beginning of line 2:

Balch ei fugunawr / ban nafawr ei lef
Pan ganer / cyrn cydawr;
Corn Llywelyn / llyw lluydfawr
Bon ehang, blaen hang, bloed fawr.

("Proud is its bellow when its cry is high,
When the horns sound in unison;
The horn of Llywelyn, leader of a great host,
Wide at the base, narrow at the tip, a mighty shout.")

The following is grace in the form of an englyn in a poem by W. D. Williams. Line 1 (from Dád to dédwyth) has cynghanedd draws (T), line 3 cynghanedd sain (S), and line 4 cynghanedd groes (C). The gair cyrch (y déuwn) is linked to the beginning of line 2 (â díolch) by cynghanedd gyrch (Cy):

O Dád, / yn deulu dédwydd––y déuwn (T)
Â díolch / o newydd (Cy)
Cans o'th law / y daw / bob dydd (S)
Ein llúniaeth / a'n llawénydd. (C)

("O Father, as a happy family, we come
With thanks anew;
For from your hand comes every day
Our sustenance and our joy.")

=== Englyn unodl crwca ===
The "crooked one-rhymed englyn". This englyn is the reverse of the englyn unodl union, in that the two seven-syllable lines come first, followed by the toddaid byr of 10 syllables and 6. The last syllables of the first, second and last lines and the seventh, eighth or ninth syllable of the third line all have the same rhyme. It is much less common than the englyn unodl union. The following example is by Dewi Wyn o Eifion (19th century):

Mae y gŵr / yn ymguraw (C)
A'i dylwyth / yn wyth neu naw (S)
Dan oer hin / yn dwyn y rhaw––mewn trymwaith (C)
Bu ganwaith / heb giniaw (C)

("The husband/man is struggling,
And his family is eight or nine,
Under cold weather bearing the spade in heavy labour,
A hundred times he has been without dinner.")

The poem is decorated with cynghanedd: cynghanedd groes (C) in lines 1, 3, and 4, and cynghanedd sain (S) in line 2. In addition to the cynghanedd groes in the last line, there is also cynghanedd sain in the words trymwaith ... ganwaith ... giniaw.

=== Englyn gwastad ===
The "even englyn", more common in the Middle Ages than later. This consists of four seven-syllable lines. All four lines rhyme. One example (showing the half-rhyme of -edd with -er) is:

Cyntefin / ceinaf amser,
Dydar adar, / glas calledd,
Ereidr yn rhych, / ych yng ngwedd,
Gwyrdd môr, / brithotor tiredd.

("Maytime, the fairest season,
Birds sing, groves are green,
Ploughs in the furrow, oxen in the yoke,
Green is the sea, lands are speckled.")

This anonymous example (found in a 13th-century manuscript but probably earlier) also has internal rhymes in each line.

=== Englyn cyrch ===
The "seeking englyn". This form has four lines of seven syllables each. The final syllables of the first, second, and last line rhyme. The final syllable of the third line rhymes with the second, third or fourth syllable of the last line. In this example by Peryf ap Cedifor (12th century), the first line has alliteration (C D F) but without matching stress, and lines 2 and 3 have cynghanedd sain:

Caradawg / fab Cedifor,
Gwalch byddin / gwerin / goror,
Hebawg teulu / cu / ceinmyn,
Anawdd gennyn / dy hepgor.

("Caradog, son of Cedifor,
Hawk of the army of the border-land host,
Falcon of a dear, splendid war-band,
It is hard for us to do without you.")

Caradog and the poet Peryf were sons of Cedifor Wyddel ("Cedifor the Irishman") of Gwynedd. Peryf's brother was one of those killed fighting for Hywel ab Owain Gwynedd at the battle of Pentraeth in Anglesey in 1170.

The englyn cyrch has much in common with the South Welsh popular verse form the triban, with lines of 3, 3, 4, and 3 accents. One difference between them is that in the triban the 3rd line has eight syllables instead of seven.

=== Englyn proest cyfnewidiog ===
This form of englyn was divided into two different metres by Einion Offeiriad in the 14th century (namely englyn proest dalgron with pure vowels, and englyn lledfbroest with long diphthongs); but they were considered to be one metre by Dafydd Nanmor in the 15th century, which he called englyn proest cyfnewidiog ("englyn of varying half-rhyme").

Proest is a kind of rhyme or assonance in which the consonants remain the same, but the vowels change. However, not every vowel can rhyme with every other. For example, a long diphthong such as ae cannot rhyme with a simple vowel such as a or e.

==== Englyn proest dalgron ====
The term talcrwn, feminine dalgron, (literally "round ended") is used of simple vowels as opposed to long diphthongs. (Einion took the word proest to be feminine, hence the feminine adjective.) In an englyn proest dalgron, there are four seven-syllable lines that half-rhyme with each other, each line using a different simple vowel.

The example below by Gruffudd ap Maredudd ap Dafydd (14th century) has cynghanedd in each line: (S) = cynghanedd sain, combining internal rhyme and alliteration, and (T) = cynghanedd draws, with alliteration only.

Adeiliwyd bedd, / gwedd gwiwder, (S)
F'enaid, / i'th gylch o fynor: (T)
Adeiliawdd / cof dy alar (T)
I'm calon / ddilon ddolur. (S)

("A grave was built, of fair aspect,
For you, my soul, of marble:
The memory of thy grief built
Pain for my innocent heart.")

The four vowels used in the proest can also be long ones, but not a mixture of long and short. The following englyn is by the poet Sefnyn (c. 1380), Elegy for cy:Iorwerth ab y Cyriog. (S) = cynghanedd sain, (C) = cynghanedd groes:

Eurawdd Iorwerth / geinferth gân (S)
Erllynedd, / gwir gyfedd gwîn, (S)
Arawd teg / o oreu tôn (C)
O rodd Duw / a eurawdd dŷn. (C)

("Iorwerth adorned a beautifully fair song with gold
Last year, a true feast of wine;
A fair panegyric of the finest sound,
A gift of God, which a man adorned with gold.")

Occasionally an englyn proest cynewidiog can have six lines. There are two examples in Guto'r Glyn's Ode in Praise of Abbot Rhys ap Dafydd, one with rhymes -un -an -yn -on -wn -in and the other with rhymes -ur -er -or -yr -ir -wr.

==== Englyn lleddfbroest ====
This is identical to the englyn proest dalgron except that the half rhymes must use the ae, oe, wy, and ei diphthongs, called lleddf ("sloping, languid"), which in proest can only rhyme with each other. The following example is attributed to Dafydd Ddu o Hiraddug (14th century).

Llawen / dan glaerwen / len laes, (S)
Lleddf olwg / gloyw / amlwg glwys, (S)
Llathrlun manol / a foleis (L)
Llarieidd / foneddigeidd foes. (S)

("Joyful beneath a bright-white trailing veil,
A gentle look, bright, manifest, and fair,
A precise radiant form that I praised,
Of mild, noble manners.")

This particular example has internal rhymes in each of its lines, with cynghanedd sain in line 1, cynghanedd sain gadwynog in lines 2, and 4, and cynghanedd lusg in line 3. There is also cymeriad llythrenol since each line begins with the same consonant. The adjective lleddf ("slanting, playful, soft, gentle, languid" etc.) in line 2 describes both the maiden's look and the long diphthongs of the rhymes.

=== Englyn proest gadwynog ===
The "chain half-rhyme englyn". In this version there are four lines of seven syllables. The first and third lines rhyme and the second and fourth also rhyme, the two rhymes being half-rhymes of each other. The following example is by Tudur Aled:

Nodi dyn / nid adwaenwn (C)
Nid adwaeniad / y dynion, (C)
Gwrda 'mhlith / gwyrda mal hwn, (C)
Gwreigdda 'mhlith / gwragedd mal hon. (C)

("I would note a man I did not recognise,
not (by) the recognition of men:
A good man amongst good men like this one,
A good woman amongst women like this one.")

Each line in this example is also decorated with cynghanedd groes (C). There is also cymeriad cynganeddol (echoed consonants) linking the beginning of lines 1 and 2, and again linking the beginning of lines 3 and 4. (See Cynghanedd.)

=== Englyn toddaid ===
This consists of a toddaid byr (10 syllables + 6), exactly as in the first two lines of an englyn unodl union, followed by a longer toddaid with either 9 or 10 syllables in the last line.

The following example is by the 20th-century poet Gwilym R. Tilsley from his poem Cwm Carnedd:

Cwm y brad / a'r ymado,––ni welwyd (L)
Eilwaith ffyniant ynddo; (Cy)
I'r gwan / a drigai yno––mawr fu baich (~T)
Gyrru gwŷr hoenfraich / o greigiau'r henfro. (C)

("Valley of the betrayal and the leaving, – there was not seen
a second time prosperity in it;
For the weak who dwelt there – great was the burden
Of driving strong-armed men from the rocks of the old country.")

The main rhyme comes in the middle of lines 1 and 3, but at the end of lines 2 and 4. The first line has cynghanedd lusg; the third has cynghanedd draws, but with unmatching stress; the last has conventional cynghanedd groes.

This metre is not one of the 24 official bardic metres specified in Eisteddfod competitions and is apparently not found before the 18th century.

== English imitations ==
The poet Robert Graves wrote an englyn in English, included in the Juvinalia (1910–1914) of his Complete Poems

A Pot of White Heather
Thou, a poor woman's fairing, white héather,
Wítherest from the ending
Of summer's bliss to the sting
Of winter's grey beginning.

Here is an English-language englyn by novelist Robertson Davies.

The Old Journalist
He types his laboured column––weary drudge!
Senile, fudge and solemn;
Spare, editor, to condemn
These dry leaves of his autumn.

These lack the full cynghanedd but in terms of syllable-count and rhyme conform to the pattern of englyn unodl union.

== Breton ==
Breton poet Padrig an Habask also writes Breton-language englynion; in 2020, he has published a collection of them called Lampreiz. (http://brezhoneg.org/en/node/11057)

== Bibliography ==
- Morris-Jones, John (1925). Cerdd Dafod. Oxford. (In Welsh)
- Rhys, John (1905), "The Origin of the Welsh Englyn and Kindred Metres", in Evans, E. Vincent (ed.), Y Cymmrodor, vol. XVIII, Honourable Society of Cymmrodorion, pp. 1–185
- Rowland, Jenny (1990). Early Welsh Saga Poetry: A Study and Edition of the Englynion. (Cambridge: Brewer)
- Rowland, Jenny (ed.) (2014). A Selection of Early Welsh Saga Poems. (London: Modern Humanities Research Association)

== See also ==
- Englynion y Beddau
- Englynion y Clywaid
- Cerdd dafod
- Traditional Welsh poetic metres
- Toddaid
