= Chain rhyme =

Rhyme scheme

Chain rhyme is a rhyme scheme that links stanzas by repeating a rhyme in two stanzas.

Chain rhyme are an integral part of many verse forms. One such is terza rima, which is written in tercets with a rhyming pattern $\mathrm{ABA \,\, BCB \,\, CDC}$. Another is the virelai ancien, which rhymes $\mathrm{AABAAB \,\, BBCBBC \,\, CCDCCD}$.

Quatrains can be written to the following pattern: $\mathrm{AABA \,\, BBCB \,\, CCDC}$.

A few well-known examples of chain rhyme appear in world literature. In Persian, chain rhyme is devoted to the poetic form of the Rubaiyat: a poem that makes use of quatrains with the rhyme scheme $\mathrm{AABA}$. Though not necessarily chain rhyme, the Rubiyat form has been mimicked throughout the world. Robert Frost made use of Rubaiyat in chain rhyme form in his poem, "Stopping by Woods on a Snowy Evening."

Chain rhyme is also known as “chain verse" or "interlocking rhyme". In chain verse the poet repeats the last syllable of a line as the first syllable of the following line. Although the syllable is repeated, it carries a different meaning.

== Examples ==
Two examples of chained verse from William T. Dobson Poetical ingenuities and eccentricities, London, 1882:

=== "Truth" (Anonymous) ===
Nerve thy soul with doctrines noble,
Noble in the walks of time,
Time that leads to an eternal,
An eternal life sublime.
Life sublime in moral beauty,
Beauty that shall never be;
Ever be to lure thee onward,
Onward to the fountain free.
Free to every earnest seeker,
Seeker for the fount of youth;
Youth exultant in its beauty,
Beauty of the living truth.
Quoted as an example of chained verse in George Lansing Raymond’s Rhythm and Harmony in Poetry and Music.

=== "Untitled" (John Byrom) ===
My spirit longeth for thee
Within my troubled breast,
Although I be unworthy
Of so divine a guest.
Of so divine a guest,
Unworthy though I be
Yet has my heart no rest,
Unless it comes from thee.
Unless it comes from thee
In vain I look around,
In all that I can see,
No rest is to be found.
No rest is to be found
But in thy blessed love,
Oh let my wish be crowned,
And send it from above.

== Sources ==
- Bradley, A. (2009). Book of rhymes: The poetics of hip hop. New York: Basic civitas books pp 75–78.
- Preminger, A. & Warnke, F.J. & Hardison, O.B. (1965). Princeton encyclopedia of poetry and poetics. Princeton, N.J.: Princeton University Press.
- George Lansing Raymond (2008). Rhythm and harmony in poetry and music. Dyson Press.
- William T. Dobson Poetical ingenuities and eccentricities, London, 1882
- James C. Parsons English versification for the use of students, Boston, 1891
