= Geraint son of Erbin =

Geraint son of Erbin (Middle Welsh Geraint uab Erbin) is a medieval Welsh poem celebrating the hero Geraint and his deeds at the Battle of Llongborth. The poem consists of three-line englyn stanzas and exists in several versions all in Middle Welsh. The earliest surviving version is in the Black Book of Carmarthen, completed around 1250, though the poem may have been composed in the 10th or 11th century. The poem is significant for its early mention of King Arthur.

== Poem and context ==
The poem's subject, Geraint mab Erbin, was a popular figure in Welsh tradition and is known through a variety of subsequent sources. Later genealogies associate him with southwestern Britain and South Wales in the late 6th century. However, Geraint achieved his greatest fame as the hero of the prose romance Geraint and Enid, a fictional tale that follows the narrative of Chrétien de Troyes' French work Erec and Enide.

Geraint son of Erbin makes heavy use of repetition in celebrating Geraint's deeds at Llongborth, which may be identified with Langport, Somerset, or Portsmouth, Hampshire though llongborth may refer to a "ship harbour", akin to the Old Norse longphort in Ireland. Each englyn echoes the form of the others, with greater or lesser variation. One stanza contains a mention of King Arthur and refers to him as amerauder, or emperor. This is the first known reference to Arthur as emperor, a title used frequently in later works but absent in the early material.

== Editions and translations ==
- Jenny Rowland, Early Welsh Saga Poetry: A Study and Edition of the 'Englynion' (Cambridge: Brewer, 1990), pp. 457–61 (edition), 504-5 (translation).

== Sources ==
- Bollard, John K. (1994). "Arthur in the Early Welsh Tradition". The Romance of Arthur: An Anthology of Medieval Texts in Translation. Routledge: 11–23.
- Bryce, Derek, ed. (1988). Arthur and the Britons in Wales and Scotland by W. F. Skene. Llanerch Enterprises.
- Koch, John T. (2006). Celtic Culture: A Historical Encyclopedia. ABC-CLIO.
