= List of Welsh-language poets (6th century to c. 1600) =

Much of Welsh language poetry has, until quite recently, been composed in various forms of strict metre (canu caeth), latterly with the encouragement of the eisteddfod movement. The following list is as inclusive as possible for the years prior to 1600. It includes as many minor poets as possible to illustrate the range and content of Welsh poetry throughout the ages. However much early poetry has been lost, and much medieval verse is either anonymous or, usually in the case of mythological poems and prophetic verse, attributed to the 6th-century poet Taliesin or the mythical figure of Myrddin. Early religious and gnomic verse is also usually anonymous. Where possible examples of each poet's surviving work is presented at Welsh Poetry at Wikisource

Each period of the poets listed below is accompanied by a graphical timeline to illustrate the main events and individuals that influenced the poets and their work. These timelines also depict the development of the Welsh language. Further details of its development may be found at Welsh language.

== Pre 6th century ==
No works by Welsh poets prior to the 6th century have survived. Tradition records:

- Maelgwyn of Llandaff (c. 450) – said, according to one source, to have written of Joseph of Arimathea's burial at Glastonbury. However, in the mid-5th century he would have spoken Brythonic, not Welsh, and as a monk would probably have written in Latin. His existence is doubtful.
- St. Meugan (fl. c. late 5th century) – possibly a court poet to Cadwallon of Gwynedd

== 6th century to 1100 ==
=== Extant ===
The bulk of surviving verse from the period known as "Canu'r Bwlch" is anonymous.(see Wikisource)

The works of the following poets, belonging to the Hengerdd or Cynfeirdd period, are extant and accepted as probably genuine:

- Aneirin (Neirin mab Dwyrei) (fl. 550–600)
- Taliesin (fl. later 6th century)

The following works are probably apocryphal:

- Meigant (fl. c. 600–620) – a poet whose surviving work is recorded in the Black Book Of Carmarthen.
- Afan Ferddig (7th century) – accepted as the author of Moliant Cadwallon a praise poem to Cadwallon ap Cadfan
- Juvencus Manuscript/ Cambridge Juvencus (late 9th century) contains two Welsh englyn-poems, one of nine and one of three englynion. For the text and Sir Ifor William's translation see: The Juvencus Englynion.
- The englyn-cycles which were previously attributed to Llywarch Hen and Heledd are now seen as works of later (9th–10th century) poets.
- St Elaeth (11th century) – a poet and a monk whose surviving verse is recorded in the Black Book Of Carmarthen.

=== Non-extant or doubtful ===
Four others are named by Nennius as poets of renown alongside Taliesin and Aneirin:

- Blwchbardd
- Cian (Guenith Guaut)
- Culfardd
- Talhaearn Tad Awen

- Arofan (7th century)
- Cuhelyn the Bard (?9th century) – referred to in several poems but otherwise unknown. None of his work survives. The earliest reference to him is in a text (English version) found in the Black Book Of Carmarthen. However, a later charter of Sir Nicholas FitzMartin, Marcher Lord of Kemes, off-handedly describes someone as his descendant; the charter grants the supposed descendant land in the Preseli Hills.
- Bleheris (?11th century) – an otherwise unknown poet of doubtful authenticity referred to as "born and bred in Wales" in Gawain and as a source for the story.

=== Other ===
- Myrddin ab Morfryn – was believed by some to be an historical person who died in AD 570, but is now accepted as a mythical figure (see Merlin).

== 1100 to 1290 ==
The following group of court poets used to be called the Gogynfeirdd and are now generally referred to as "Beirdd y Tywysogion", the Poets of the Princes. The list is roughly chronological.

- Meilyr Brydydd (fl. 1100–1137)
- Gwalchmai ap Meilyr (fl. 1130–1180)
- Owain Cyfeiliog (c. 1130–1197)
- Llywarch Llaety (fl. c. 1140–1160)
- Llywelyn Fardd I – (fl. c. 1150–1175) – named in the Red Book of Hergest as “Llywelyn Fardd, son of Cywryd”.
- Seisyll Bryffwrch (fl. 1155–1175)
- Cynddelw Brydydd Mawr (fl. 1155–1200)
- Peryf ap Cedifor (fl. c. 1170)
- Hywel ab Owain Gwynedd (died 1170)
- Gwynfardd Brycheiniog (fl. c. 1170–1180)
- Llywarch ap Llywelyn ("Prydydd y Moch") (1173–1220)
- Elidir Sais (1190–1240)
- Meilyr ap Gwalchmai (fl. second half of the 12th century)
- Gwilym Rhyfel (12th century)
- Cneppyn Gwerthrynion (c. 13th century)
- Einion ap Gwalchmai (fl. 1202–1223)
- Einion Wan (fl. c. 1202–1245)
- Einion ap Gwgon (fl. c. 1215)
- Y Prydydd Bychan (fl. c. 1222–1268)
- Goronwy Foel (fl. c. middle of the 13th century)
- Dafydd Benfras (fl. 1230–1260)
- Hywel Foel ap Griffri ap Pwyll Wyddel (fl. c. 1240–1300)
- Adda Fras (c. 1240 – c. 1320) – whose poems haven't survived but whose name is recorded in one of the Peniarth manuscripts and in Tudur Aled's elegy to Dafydd ab Edmwnd.
- Madog ap Gwallter (fl. c. 1250)
- Bleddyn Fardd (fl. c. 1258–1284)
- Llygad Gŵr (fl. 1268)
- Gruffudd ab yr Ynad Coch (fl. 1277–1282)
- Cadwgan Ffôl (13th century) – whose englyn celebrating a victory gained by the Welsh over the English at Degannwy is preserved in one of the Peniarth Manuscripts.

== 1290 to c.1500 ==
The poets of this period are known as Beirdd yr Uchelwyr. The list is fairly chronological but not exhaustive as the work of some minor poets of the late 15th and 16th centuries remains in manuscript and a large corpus of late medieval Darogan, prophetic verse, is anonymous or attributed to early poets. Traditional patronage dwindled in the late 16th century but a handful of bards still received patronage from the gentry into the 17th century. Free verse by individuals composing "freelance" gradually took over from the mid-16th century onwards.

- Casnodyn (fl. first half of the 14th century)
- Phylip Brydydd (fl. c. 1300–1325)
- Madog Benfras (fl. c. 1320–1360) – best known for his elegy on Dafydd ap Gwilym.
- Dafydd ap Gwilym (c. 1320 – c. 1370)
- Iolo Goch (1320–1398)
- Bleddyn Ddu (fl. c. 1330-1385) – whose surviving poems are preserved in the Red Book of Hergest.
- Rhys Goch Eryri (1330–1420)
- Gruffudd Gryg (fl. c.1340–1380)
- Gruffudd ab Adda (fl. mid 14th century)
- Llywelyn Goch ap Meurig Hen (fl. c. 1350–1390)
- Gruffudd ap Maredudd ap Dafydd (fl. 1352–1382) – famed for his awdlau to the Chester Rood and the Virgin Mary, and for his elegy to Gwenhwyfar of Pentraeth.
- Einion Offeiriad (died 1356)
- Tudur ap Gwyn Hagr (fl. second half of the 14th century)
- Iorwerth Beli (fl. second half of the 14th century)
- Dafydd ap Hywel ap Madoc ("Dafydd Ddu Athro o Hiraddug") (died 1371)
- Dafydd y Coed (fl. 1380) – whose awdlau and satirical poems are found in the Red Book of Hergest.
- Mab y Clochyddyn (fl. c. 1380) – whose elegy to Gwenhwyfar, "Marwnad Gwenhwyfar ferch Madog", is found in the Red Book of Hergest.
- Gruffudd Llwyd (fl. c.1380–1410)
- Dafydd Bach ap Madog Wladaidd ("Sypyn Cyfeiliog") (fl. 1340–1390)
- Siôn Cent (ca. 1400–1430/45)
- Dafydd Llwyd ap Llywelyn ap Gruffudd (Dafydd Llwyd o Fathafarn) (fl. c. 1400–1490)
- Sefnyn (fl. 1408)
- Dafydd Gorlech (c. 1410 – c. 1490)
- Ieuan ap Rhydderch ab Ieuan Llwyd (fl.1410-1430)
- Lewys Glyn Cothi (c. 1420–1490)
- Tudur Penllyn (fl. c. 1420–1490)
- Hywel Swrdwal (fl. 1430–1475)
- Hywel Cilan (fl. 1435–1470) – who composed poems to the nobility of north Wales.
- Guto'r Glyn (c. 1435 – c. 1493)
- Llywelyn ab y Moel (died 1440)
- Sefnyn (fl.1440)
- Gwilym ab Ieuan Hen (fl. c. 1440–1480)
- Llawdden (fl. 1440–1480)
- Maredudd ap Rhys (fl. 1440–1483)
- Ieuan Gethin (fl. c. 1450)
- Maredudd ap Rhys (c. 1450–1480)
- Dafydd ab Edmwnd (fl. c. 1450–1497)
- Rhys Brydydd (fl. mid-15th century)
- Ieuan Brydydd Hir (fl. 1450–1485)
- Dafydd Nanmor (fl. 1450–1490)
- Bedo Brwynllys (fl. c. 1460)
- Dafydd Epynt (fl. c. 1460) – who composed poems in praise of Christ, patron saints and the nobility associated with Brecon and Abergavenny. Texts of his poems are found in the Peniarth manuscripts.
- Deio ab Ieuan Du (fl. 1460–1480)
- Ieuan Dyfi (c. 1460–1500)
- Gutun Owain (fl. 1460–1500)
- Gwilym Tew (fl. 1460–1480)
- Gwerful Mechain (fl. 1462–1500)
- Ieuan ap Tudur Penllyn
- Owain ap Llywelyn ab y Moel (fl. 1470–1500)
- Rhys Nanmor (fl. 1480–1513)
- Siôn ap Hywel (fl. c. 1490–1532)
- Rhisiart ap Rhys (fl. c. 1495–1510)
- Bedo Aeddren (fl. 1500)
- Dafydd ap Ieuan Llwyd (fl. 1500)

== 16th century ==
Most of the earlier poets here are very much in the Beirdd yr Uchelwyr tradition. Traditional patronage dwindled in the late 16th century but a handful of bards still received patronage from the gentry into the 17th century. Free verse by individuals composing "freelance" gradually took over from the mid-16th century onwards. The free verse and strict metre poets sit rather uneasily together in this list.

- Tudur Aled (c. 1465–1525)
- William Birchinshaw (fl. 1584–1617)
- Lewys Môn (fl. 1485–1527)
- Siôn Ceri (fl. early 16th century)
- Dafydd ap Rhys O Fenai (fl. 16th century)
- Meurig Dafydd (c. 1510–95), bard, genealogist and historian in Glamorgan
- Lewys Morgannwg (fl. 1520–1565)
- Siôn Tudur (1522–1602)
- Morus Dwyfech (1523- 1590) - poet in Gwynedd writing many types of verse and also his will in the form of a poem.
- Dafydd Trefor (died 1528) – whose work includes cywyddau on religious themes and an elegy on the death of Henry VII.
- Simwnt Fychan (c. 1530–1606)
- Wiliam Llŷn (c. 1535 – 1580), the "supreme elegist" of the bardic tradition
- St. Richard Gwyn (c. 1537–1584) – who composed a number of odes in defence of Catholicism, while jailed.
- Alis Wen (Alice ferch Gruffudd ap Ieuan Fychan; fl. 1540–1570) – whose surviving poems include musings on the type of man she desired to marry and on her fathers’ second marriage.
- Catrin ferch Gruffudd ap Ieuan Fychan (fl. 16th century) – whose surviving poem is on a theme of religion.
- Morus Dwyfach (fl. 1540–1580)
- Rhys Cain (c. 1540–1614)
- Llywelyn Siôn (c. 1540–1615)
- Siôn Phylip (1543–1620)
- Edmwnd Prys (c. 1543–1623)
- Robin Clidro (1545–1580)
- Dafydd Alaw (fl. 1550) – whose surviving work includes an elegy to Lewys Môn and poems in praise of the nobility of Anglesey.
- Wiliam Midleton (c. 1550 – c. 1596)
- Morris Kyffin (c. 1555–1598)
- Catrin ferch Gruffudd ap Hywel (fl. 1555) – who composed a poem in praise of Jesus Christ.
- Gwilym Gwyn (fl. c. 1560–1600) – whose surviving work includes a cywydd to St. Elian Geimiad.
- Gruffudd Hiraethog (died 1564)
- Tomos Prys (c. 1564–1634)
- Richard Hughes (c.1565–1618)
- Rhisiart Gruffudd (fl. c. 1569) – whose surviving work includes a poem seeking reconciliation between Sir Richard Bulkeley of Anglesey with his second wife, Agnes, who had been accused of poisoning her husband.
- Rhys Prichard (1579–1644)
- William Cynwal (died c.1587) - known for his long ymryson with Edmwnd Prys
- Cadwaladr ap Rhys Trefnant (fl. 1600) – whose surviving poems in praise of noble families of Montgomeryshire are recorded in some of the Peniarth and Mostyn manuscripts.
