= The Oxford Book of Welsh Verse =

1962 anthology of poetry in Welsh

The Oxford Book of Welsh Verse (1962), edited by Thomas Parry, is an anthology of Welsh-language poetry stretching from Aneirin in the 6th century to Bobi Jones in the 20th. No translations of the poems are provided, but the introduction and notes are in English. It was the first anthology to give the reader a thorough idea of Welsh poetry in its entirety through 1400 years, containing as it does 370 poems, of which 59 cannot be securely attributed while the rest are the work of 146 named poets. It went through eight editions in its first 21 years, and was supplemented in 1977 by the publication of Gwyn Jones's Oxford Book of Welsh Verse in English.

== Poets included ==
The names in brackets are bardic names.

- Ambrose, William (Emrys)
- Aneirin
- Blackwell, John (Alun)
- Bowen, Ben
- Bowen, Euros
- Bowen, Geraint
- Cynddelw Brydydd Mawr
- Dafydd ab Edmwnd
- Dafydd ap Gwilym
- Dafydd Bach ap Madog Wladaidd
- Dafydd Llwyd
- Dafydd Nanmor
- Davies, Eirian
- Davies, H. Emyr
- Davies, James Kitchener
- Davies, John Glyn
- Davies, Pennar
- Davies, Walter (Gwallter Mechain)
- Davis, David
- Edwards, Jenkin Morgan
- Edwards, William Thomas (Gwilym Deudraeth)
- Eilian, John
- Einion ap Gwalchmai
- Ellis, Robert (Cynddelw)
- Evans, Ellis (Hedd Wyn)
- Evans, Evan
- Evans, Evan (Ieuan Glan Geirionydd)
- Evans, William (Wil Ifan)
- Griffiths, Ann
- Griffiths, John Gwyn
- Gruffudd ab Adda
- Gruffudd ab yr Ynad Coch
- Gruffudd ap Maredudd
- Gruffudd Gryg
- Gruffudd Hiraethog
- Gruffudd, Siôn
- Gruffydd, William John
- Guto'r Glyn
- Gutun Owain
- Gwalchmai ap Meilyr
- Gwyn, Harri
- Gwynfardd Brycheiniog
- Hooson, Isaac Daniel
- Hughes, John Ceiriog
- Hughes, John Griffith Moelwyn
- Hughes, Mathonwy
- Hughes, Richard
- Hughes, Thomas Rowland
- Hughes, William Roger
- Humphreys, Robert
- Huw, Rolant
- Hywel ab Owain Gwynedd
- Ieuan Brydydd Hir
- Ieuan Du'r Bilwg
- Iolo Goch
- Iorwerth Fynglwyd
- James, David Emrys (Dewi Emrys)
- Jenkin, John (Ioan Siencyn)
- Jones, Albert Evans (Cynan)
- Jones, Bobi
- Jones, David Gwenallt
- Jones, Ellis
- Jones, Gwilym Richard
- Jones, John (Talhaiarn)
- Jones, Owen Wynne (Glasynys)
- Jones, Thomas
- Jones, Thomas (Taliesin o Eifion)
- Jones, Thomas (Tudno)
- Jones, Thomas Gwynn
- Jones, William
- Jones, William (Ehedydd Iâl)
- Jones, William Ellis (Cawrdaf)
- Lewis Glyn Cothi
- Lewis Môn
- Lewis, Howell Elvet (Elfed)
- Lewis, Peter
- Lewis, Saunders
- Llawdden
- Lloyd, Henry (Ap Hefin)
- Lloyd-Jones, John
- Llwyd, Huw
- Llwyd, Morgan
- Llygad Gŵr
- Llywelyn ab y Moel
- Llywelyn ap Gutun
- Llywelyn ap Hwlcyn
- Llywelyn Goch ap Meurig Hen
- Llywelyn-Williams, Alun
- Madog ap Gwallter
- Madog Benfras
- Meilyr
- Morgan, John
- Morris, Edward
- Morris, Lewis
- Morris, William
- Morris-Jones, John
- Morus, Huw
- Nicholas, T. E.
- Owain Cyfeiliog
- Owen, Goronwy
- Owen, John Dyfnallt
- Owen, Owen Griffith (Alafon)
- Parry, Robert Williams
- Parry-Williams, Thomas Herbert
- Peate, Iorwerth Cyfeiliog
- Peryf ap Cedifor
- Phillips, Edgar (Trefîn)
- Phillips, John (Tegidon)
- Phylip, Rhisiart
- Phylip, Siôn
- Phylip, William
- Powel, Salbri
- Price, David (Dewi Dinorwig)
- Prichard, Caradog
- Prys, Edmwnd
- Rees, William (Gwilym Hiraethog)
- Rhys, Prosser
- Richard, Edward
- Roberts, Absalom
- Roberts, David (Dewi Havhesp)
- Roberts, Robert Meirion
- Roberts, Robert Silyn
- Siôn Cent
- Taliesin
- Thomas, Ebenezer (Eben Fardd)
- Thomas, Evan
- Thomas, Thomas Jacob (Sarnicol)
- Thomas, William (Gwilym Marles)
- Thomas, William (Islwyn)
- Tudur Aled
- Tudur Penllyn
- Tudur, Siôn
- Wiliam Llŷn
- Williams, Edward (Iolo Morganwg)
- Williams, Eliseus (Eifion Wyn)
- Williams, Griffith John
- Williams, John (Ioan Madog)
- Williams, John James
- Williams, John Owen (Pedrog)
- Williams, Robert (Robert ab Gwilym Ddu)
- Williams, Waldo
- Williams, William (Caledfryn)
- Williams, William (Pantycelyn)
- Williams, William Crwys
- Williams, William David
- Williams, William Nantlais
- Wynne, Ellis

== Editorial principles ==
The Oxford Book of Welsh Verse presents its poems in the original Welsh without translation, though the introduction and notes are in English. It is an anthology intended for the general Welsh-speaking reader rather than the professional Celticist, and Parry's editorial practice reflects that fact. It has no apparatus criticus, the endnotes are brief, poems are sometimes printed in abridged form without the use of ellipses or any other indication of cuts, and spelling and punctuation are both modernized. The poems are chosen for their intrinsic literary merit, rather than for their historical interest as representing the various genres prevalent at different periods. Preference is given to poems in the traditional meters, in keeping with the introduction's stress on the continuity of Welsh poetry through the centuries, though the editor also includes hymns, lyrics and other works in the free metres.

== Reception ==
The publication of The Oxford Book of Welsh Verse was widely acclaimed. Kenneth Hurlstone Jackson, writing in The Modern Language Review, welcomed its appearance as long overdue and congratulated Oxford University Press on its choice of Thomas Parry, an eminent Celticist and an accomplished poet in his own right, as editor. He praised Parry's choice of poems, saying he wished nothing in the book left out, and admired the notes and the historical survey of Welsh poetry in the introduction. Édouard Bachellery, in the journal Études Celtiques, likewise acknowledged Parry to be a man of taste and a great scholar, and he considered the book's publication an event of importance. He felt that certain poets were underrepresented, but admitted that limitations of space made some such niggles inevitable. Parry has since been criticised for including only one woman poet, Ann Griffiths, if dubious attributions to women are left aside, and for insufficiently representing the overtly Christian strand in Welsh verse. Nevertheless, despite the later appearance of similar anthologies, it is still considered the most authoritative collection of the best in Welsh poetry, and it remains much used in Welsh universities and schools.
