= The Oxford Book of Welsh Verse in English =

1977 poetry anthology

First edition

The Oxford Book of Welsh Verse in English is a 1977 poetry anthology edited by the author and academic Gwyn Jones. It covers both Welsh language poetry in English translation and poetry written in English by Welsh poets (often called Anglo-Welsh poetry).

== Poets in The Oxford Book of Welsh Verse in English ==
- Dannie Abse
- Aneirin
- Euros Bowen
- Brenda Chamberlain
- Coslett Coslett
- Cynddelw Brydydd Mawr
- Dafydd ab Edmwnd
- Dafydd ab Gwilym
- Dafydd Bach ap Madog Wladaidd
- Dafydd Benfras
- Dafydd Nanmor
- Edward Davies
- Gareth Alban Davies
- Gloria Evans Davies
- Idris Davies
- J. Kitchener Davies
- T. Glynne Davies
- Walter Davies
- William Henry Davies
- John Dyer
- Tom Earley
- Robert Ellis
- Evan Evans
- Margiad Evans
- Llewelyn Wyn Griffith
- Ann Griffiths
- Gruffudd ab yr Ynad Coch
- Owen Gruffydd
- Gwerfyl Mechain
- George Herbert
- Lord Herbert of Cherbury
- Hugh Holland
- James Howell
- John Ceiriog Hughes
- Richard Hughes
- Emyr Humphreys
- Hywel ab Owain Gwynedd
- Iolo Goch
- Bobi Jones
- David Jones
- David Gwenallt Jones
- Ellis Jones
- Glyn Jones
- Gwilym R. Jones
- Gwyn Jones
- Thomas Gwynn Jones
- Thomas Harri Jones
- Alun Lewis
- Lewis Glyn Cothi
- Howell Elvet Lewis
- Saunders Lewis
- Llawdden
- Evan Lloyd
- Huw Llywd
- Llywelyn ab y Moel
- Llywelyn Goch ap Meurig Hen
- Alun Llywelyn-Williams
- Roland Mathias
- Meilyr Brydydd
- Huw Menai
- Lewis Morris
- John Morris-Jones
- Huw Morus
- Leslie Norris
- John Ormond
- Goronwy Owen
- Wilfred Owen
- Robert Williams Parry
- Thomas Herbert Parry-Williams
- Emily Jane Pfeiffer
- Siôn Phylip
- William Phylip
- John Cowper Powys
- Edmwnd Prys
- Thomas Prys
- A. G. Prys-Jones
- John Machreth Rees
- Ernest Rhys
- David Roberts
- Siôn Cent
- Christopher Smart
- Taliesin
- Dylan Thomas
- Edward Thomas
- Gwyn Thomas
- R. S. Thomas
- Thomas Jacob Thomas
- Henry Treece
- Tudur Aled
- Henry Vaughan
- Thomas Vaughan
- Vernon Watkins
- Rowland Watkyns
- Charles Hanbury Williams
- Edward Williams
- Eliseus Williams
- Gwyn Williams
- Rhydwen Williams
- Robert Williams
- Waldo Williams
- William Williams Pantycelyn

== Publication details ==
- Jones, Gwyn, ed. (1977). The Oxford Book of Welsh Verse in English. Oxford University Press. ISBN 9780192118585.
- Jones, Gwyn, ed. (1983). The Oxford Book of Welsh Verse in English. Oxford University Press. ISBN 9780192813978.
