= Einion =

Einion, the Welsh form of the Latin Ennianus, (Note: It is unrelated to the now identical Welsh word einion meaning "anvil".) is a male Welsh given name and may refer to:

- Einion Offeiriad ("Einion the Priest") (died 1356), Welsh poet and grammarian
- Einion ap Gwalchmai (1202–1223), Welsh court poet
- Einion ap Gwgon (fl. c. 1215), Welsh court poet
- Einion ap Gollwyn, (possibly legendary) Welsh prince of the eleventh century
- Einion Wan (fl. c. 1202–1245), Welsh court poet
- Saint Einion Frenin (c. 5th century), a son of Owain Ddantgwyn who reigned as a local king in Gwynedd
- Einion Yrth ap Cunedda (c. 420–500; reigned from the 470s), king of Gwynedd

== See also ==
- Cefn Einion, small dispersed village in South Shropshire, England
- Coed Cwm Einion, a woodland to the east of the village of Furnace, Wales
- Anian (disambiguation)
- Anianus (disambiguation)
- Eifion (disambiguation)
- Bennion, a surname derived from Einion.
