= Indeg =

Indeg, daughter of Garwy Hir, was known in early Welsh legend as one of the three mistresses of King Arthur. Though her story seems to have survived down to the later Middle Ages, when she was frequently cited by Welsh poets as a standard for beauty, it has since been lost.

== Early Welsh literature ==
Indeg is identified in Welsh tradition as being the daughter of Garwy Hir, who was known for being a great lover, and specifically, according to the Welsh poet Hywel ab Einion Llygliw, the lover of Creirwy daughter of Ceridwen. There is an allusion to Indeg in a 14th-century Welsh poem which suggests that the poet knew of a story about King Arthur's wooing of Indeg, but neither this nor any other story about her now survives. One of the earliest references to Indeg is in no. 57 of the Welsh Triads, which names her as one of the three concubines of King Arthur, along with the similarly ill-attested Garwen daughter of Henin Hen and Gŵyl daughter of Gendawd. There are also passing mentions of her in the story of Culhwch and Olwen, where she is listed as one of the ladies at the court of King Arthur, and amongst the marginalia of the Hendregadredd Manuscript.

== The later Middle Ages ==
The figure of Indeg was well known to 14th- and 15th-century Welsh bards, who frequently named her, like Eigr, Enid, Esyllt, Luned, and Tegau, as a paragon of female beauty with which their subjects could be compared, a "measure of maidens" as Llywelyn Goch called her. Among the poets to mention her are Casnodyn, Gruffudd ap Maredudd, Madog Benfras, Llywelyn Goch (in his "Lament for Lleucu Llwyd"), Lewys Glyn Cothi, Dafydd ab Edmwnd, and Dafydd Nanmor. The greatest of them all, Dafydd ap Gwilym, used her name in no less than eight poems, possibly attracted by its usefulness as a rhyme for teg ("fair"). He describes various ladies who have caught his attention as being "Indeg's equal" ("The Wave on the River Dyfi" and "Farewell"), "an Indeg of shining passion" ("Dyddgu and Morfudd"), a "dazzling Indeg" ("Appealing to Dwynwen"), and "Indeg's twin" ("The Poet's Superiority Over His Rival"). As late as the Elizabethan era the bard Richard Hughes finished one of his poems with the assertion that Rwy' fel Indeg yn ynfydu ("I am, like Indeg, going out of my mind").

== Modern culture ==
Indeg entered English literature with her brief appearance in Thomas Love Peacock's 1829 novel The Misfortunes of Elphin. Her name remains in occasional use in Wales as a girls' forename.
