= Coed (disambiguation) =

Coed or mixed-gender education is the integrated education of male and female students in the same environment.

Coed may also refer to:

- Betws-y-Coed, a village in Conwy County Borough, Wales
- CoED Biosciences (company), a Biotechnology startup based in Bristol, UK
- Coed Records, an American record label
- Coed School, a South Korean dance/pop group
- COED (website) - an online entertainment magazine that focuses on college lifestyle
- Concise Oxford English Dictionary, a popular dictionary
- Dafydd y Coed, fourteenth-century Welsh poet
- Llwyd ap Cil Coed, a character in Welsh mythology, whose surname means "trees"
- The COED Project, software project created by the US Department of Commerce in the 1970s

== See also ==
- Betty Co-ed (disambiguation)
