= Lament for Lleucu Llwyd =

14th-century Welsh-language poem

"Lament for Lleucu Llwyd" (Welsh: Marwnad Lleucu Llwyd) is a Middle Welsh poem by the 14th-century bard Llywelyn Goch ap Meurig Hen in the form of a cywydd. It is his most famous work, and has been called one of the finest of all cywyddau and one of the greatest of all Welsh-language love-poems, comparable with the best poems of Dafydd ap Gwilym. The culmination of a series of poems addressed to his lover Lleucu Llwyd, a married woman, it differs from them in calling her forth from her grave as if he were a more conventional lover serenading her as she lies in bed. The effect is said to be "startling, original, but in no way grotesque". Idris Bell called it "one of the most moving poems of its kind not in Welsh only, but in any literature". It was included in both The Oxford Book of Welsh Verse and The Oxford Book of Welsh Verse in English.

== Llywelyn's poems to Lleucu Llwyd ==
It is known that Llywelyn wrote several other poems to Lleucu on the evidence of references to them in others of his poems and in a poem by Llywelyn's contemporary Iolo Goch, but it is not certain that any of these is extant. Probable survivors from these poems are a cywydd in which he sends a bird as a love-messenger to "Dafydd's wife" (Lleucu is said to have been married to a certain Dafydd Ddu), and an anonymous englyn containing a mention of Lleucu Llwyd's name. The Lament itself is mentioned in another of Llywelyn's poems, his "Awdl Gyffes", as one of the crimes he was guilty of having committed.

== Early reputation and later legend ==
Even in the 14th century "Lament for Lleucu Llwyd" was a famous poem, always the first to be asked for wherever young people gathered together according to Iolo Goch, who also praised it (or he may have been referring to the whole series of Llywelyn's Lleucu poems) as a work that would appeal to that philandering poet King David in Heaven and ensure his advocacy for Llywelyn's salvation.

The Lament itself claims that Lleucu, a lady of Pennal in Merionethshire, had died while Llywelyn was away in south Wales. It was suggested by Thomas Parry that the poem was written during Lleucu's lifetime as a fictitious elegy, though Rachel Bromwich felt that its expression of passionate and apparently spontaneous grief made this unlikely. A fictional narrative in a 17th-century manuscript portrays Llywelyn as dying immediately after writing the poem. A legend grew up that Lleucu's father forbade her marriage to Llywelyn, and that while Llywelyn was away on business in south Wales the father told Lleucu that he had married another woman. She died of a broken heart, and Llywelyn returned in time to attend her funeral and write the poem.

== Sources and analogues ==
The form of Llywelyn's poem, addressed to his dead lover, is clearly modelled on that of the serenade which was in common use in the Middle Ages as a wooing technique, doubtless as much in 14th-century Wales as anywhere else. Dafydd ap Gwilym was similarly influenced by the serenade in his lament over the death of his uncle Llywelyn ap Gwilym, and since there are also some verbal similarities between the two poems it is possible that Dafydd's poem influenced Llywelyn's, though the question is complicated by our uncertainty as to which was written first. Rachel Bromwich also saw in the poem's unrestrained, exclamatory reproaches to the beloved "for her silence, and for breaking troth with her lover by her death" a parallel with the traditional Irish keen. There is a passage in the Lament in which Lleucu bequeaths her soul to God, her body to the earth, her wealth to "the proud dark man" and her longing to Llywelyn. This echoes the amorous last well and testaments in various contemporary French love poems of which the Roman de la Rose is one example. Llywelyn may have drawn on his knowledge of Welsh legend for a line in which he compares Lleucu to that "measure of maidens, Indeg", a concubine of King Arthur whose story has not survived.

== Influence ==
"Lament for Lleucu Llwyd" began a new genre of Welsh poem, the woman's elegy in cywydd form, of which examples can be found in the work of Dafydd Nanmor and Bedo Brwynllys in the 15th century, and Wiliam Llŷn in the 16th. The Lament was also the inspiration for T. Gwynn Jones's "Y Breuddwyd" (The Dream), a poem which leads Llywelyn up to Heaven to meet Lleucu.

== English translations and paraphrases ==
- Bell, David, in Bell, H. Idris (1944). "Translations from the cywyddwyr, II". The Transactions of the Honourable Society of Cymmrodorion, Session 1942: 138–140.
- Clancy, Joseph P. (1965). Medieval Welsh Lyrics. London: Macmillan. pp. 116–119.
  - Revised translation in Jones, Gwyn, ed. (1977). The Oxford Book of Welsh Verse in English. Oxford: Oxford University Press. pp. 42–45. ISBN 9780192118585.
  - Further revised in Clancy, Joseph P. (2003). Medieval Welsh Poems. Dublin: Four Courts Press. pp. 224–227. ISBN 9781851826964.
- Evan Evans, in Jones, Edward (1802). The Bardic Museum of Primitive British Literature. London: pp. p. 51. Abridged paraphrase.
- Johnston, Dafydd, in Medieval Welsh Poems: An Anthology. Translated by Loomis, Richard; Johnston, Dafydd. Binghamton: Medieval & Renaissance Texts & Studies. 1992. pp. 112–114. ISBN 0866981020.
- Williams, Gwyn (1973). Welsh Poems: Sixth Century to 1600. London: Faber and Faber. pp. 56–58. ISBN 9780571103799.
