= Gwilym =

Gwilym is a Welsh given name and surname, related to William, Guillaume, and others in a number of other languages.

== Given name ==
- Gwilym ab Ieuan Hen (1440–1480), Welsh language poet
- Gwilym Davies (minister) CBE (1879–1955), Welsh Baptist minister
- Gwilym Edwards (1881–1963), Welsh Presbyterian minister
- Gwilym Ellis Lane Owen (1922–1982), Welsh philosopher
- Gwil Owen (born 1960), American singer/songwriter
- Gwilym Gibbons (born 1971), British arts leader
- Gwilym Gwent (1834–1891), Welsh-born composer in the United States
- Gwilym Jenkins (1933–1982), British statistician and systems engineer
- Gwilym Jones (born 1947), British Conservative politician
- Gwilym Kessey (1919–1986), Australian cricketer
- Gwilym Lee (born 1983), British actor
- Gwilym Lloyd George, 1st Viscount Tenby (1894–1967), politician and UK cabinet minister
- Gwilym Thomas Mainwaring (1941–2019), Welsh rugby player
- Gwilym Owen Williams (1913–1990), Anglican Archbishop of Wales from 1971 to 1982
- Gwilym Prys Davies, Baron Prys-Davies (1923–2017), Welsh politician
- Gwilym Puw (William Pugh) (1618–1689), Welsh Catholic poet and Royalist officer
- Gwilym R. Jones (1903–1993), awarded three literary awards at the National Eisteddfod of Wales
- Gwilym Rhyfel (fl. 12th century), Welsh language poet and warrior
- Gwilym Roberts (1928–2018), British Labour Party politician
- Gwilym Sainsbury (Gwil Sainsbury) (1988-present) songwriter and former guitarist, bassist in the band alt-j
- Gwilym Tew (1460–1480), Welsh language poet and manuscript copyist
- Gwilym Simcock (born 1981), British pianist and composer
- Gwilym Tilsley (1911–1997), Welsh poet
- Gwilym Went (1914–2005), Welsh cricketer
- William Rees (Gwilym Hiraethog) (1802–1883), Welsh poet and author
- William Thomas (Gwilym Marles) (1834–1878), Welsh minister and poet

== Surname ==
- Dafydd ap Gwilym (1315–1350), Welsh poet
- Eurfyl ap Gwilym (born 1944), Welsh Plaid Cymru politician
- Gwynn ap Gwilym (1950–2016), Welsh language poet, novelist, editor and translator
- Lisa Gwilym (born 1975), Welsh broadcaster
- Lowri Gwilym (1955–2010), Welsh television and radio producer
- Meinir Gwilym (born 1983), Welsh-language pop and folk singer
- Mike Gwilym (born 1949), Welsh actor
- Robert Gwilym (born 1956), Welsh actor
- Tich Gwilym (1951–2005), Welsh guitarist

== See also ==
- Gwilliam (disambiguation), a related name
