= Llangynwyd Middle =

Llangynwyd Middle: Welsh: Llangynwyd Ganol
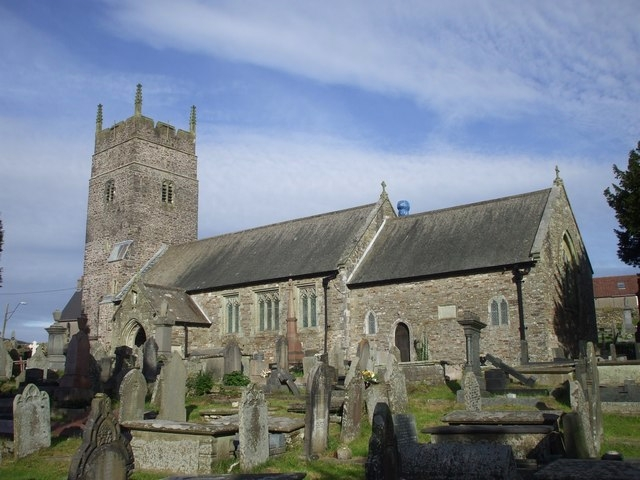
- St Cynwyd's Church, Llangynwyd

- Location within Bridgend
- Population: 3,032
- OS grid reference: SS866888
- Community: Llangynwyd Middle
- Principal area: Bridgend
- Preserved county: Mid Glamorgan
- Country: Wales
- Sovereign state: United Kingdom
- Post town: MAESTEG
- Postcode district: CF34 9xx
- Dialling code: 01656
- Police: South Wales
- Fire: South Wales
- Ambulance: Welsh
- UK Parliament: Aberafan Maesteg
- Senedd Cymru – Welsh Parliament: Ogmore
- List of places UK Wales Bridgend 51.586881°N 3.637943°W Map of the community

Llangynwyd Middle (Welsh: Llangynwyd Ganol) is a community in Bridgend County Borough, south Wales. It is located to the south of Maesteg and contains the villages of Llangynwyd and Cwmfelin. At the 2001 census, the population of the community was 2,843, increasing to 3,032 at the 2011 Census.

The community is the northern part of the old parish of Llangynwyd, and was created by government reorganisation in 1974. The majority of Llangynwyd Middle is made up of hilly farmland and is sparsely populated. The River Llynfi flows through the community alongside the A4063, the main road linking Maesteg in the north and Bridgend town in the south.

== History ==
The community of Llangynwyd Middle makes up most of the old parish of Llangynwyd once known as yr Hen Blwyf (the old parish). One of the first areas of upland Glamorgan to come under the rule of the Normans, it became known as Tir Iarll (the earl's land) and was believed to be annexed by Robert, Earl of Gloucester. A castle was built there in the 12th century, though the fortification, now known as Llangynwyd Castle, was first mentioned in 1246. The castle was destroyed in 1257, probably by Llywelyn ap Gruffudd. The castle was partially rebuilt by Gilbert de Clare during the 1260s, but was again sacked in the riots of 1294-5. This time the castle was left ruinous and today only basic masonry and foundation stones can be seen.

Despite falling under early Norman rule, the area around Llangynwyd remained rooted in Welsh traditions, and became a centre of Welsh literary tradition, and is connected with Welsh medieval poets, such as Rhys Brydydd, Rhisiart ap Rhys and Gwilym Tew. During the 14th century, a church dedicated to St Cynwyd was raised, which gives its name to the community. The church, built with a square unbuttressed western tower, was greatly restored between 1891-3 by G.E. Halliday. Ann Maddocks the 'Maid of Cefn Ydfa', is buried in the churchyard.
