= Dafydd Llwyd ap Dafydd ab Einion ap Hywel =

Dafydd Llwyd ap Dafydd ab Einion ap Hywel (died before 1469) was a prominent Welsh patron of the bards. He was a descendant of Elstan Glodrydd. His generosity towards the bards, and as an entertainer was acknowledged by the likes of Lewis Glyn Cothi, Guto'r Glyn, and Llawdden. Hywel Swrdwal is thought to have been his household bard.
