= Fras =

Fras may refer to:

== People ==
- Adda Fras (fl. 1240), Welsh poet
- Damjan Fras (born 1973), Slovenian ski jumper
- Milan Fras, Slovenian singer, member of Laibach
- Slavko Fras (1928-2010), Slovenian journalist
- Théophile Fras (born 1873), French cyclist

== Places ==
- Aïn Fras, Mascara Province, Algeria
- Foel-fras, Carneddau range, Wales
- Haig Fras, rocky outcrop in the Celtic Sea

== See also ==
- Fra
- FRAS (disambiguation)
- Frass
- Fraas
