= Cwmfelin =

Coordinates: 51.595558°N 3.654036°W

Cwmfelin: Welsh: Cwmfelin
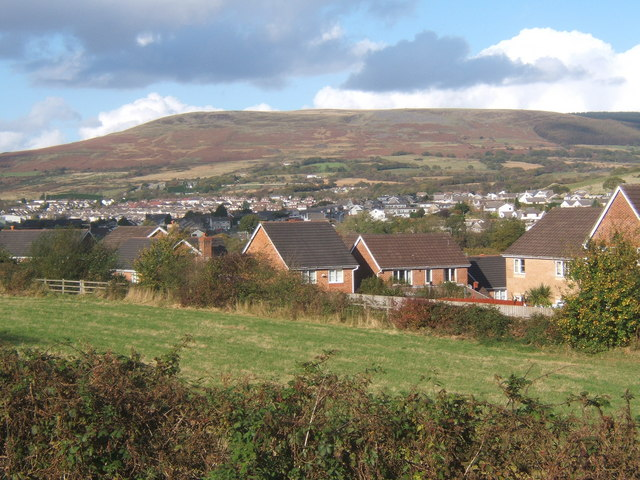
- Overlooking Cwmfelin, with Mynydd Bach in the background

- Location within Bridgend
- OS grid reference: SS855898
- Community: Llangynwyd Middle
- Principal area: Bridgend
- Preserved county: Mid Glamorgan
- Country: Wales
- Sovereign state: United Kingdom
- Post town: MAESTEG
- Postcode district: CF34
- Dialling code: 01656
- Police: South Wales
- Fire: South Wales
- Ambulance: Welsh
- UK Parliament: Aberafan Maesteg
- Senedd Cymru – Welsh Parliament: Ogmore

Cwmfelin is a village on the southern outskirts of Maesteg, in the county borough of Bridgend, Wales. It was once part of the medieval commote of Tir Iarll, before becoming a part of the parish of Llangynwyd. Since 1974 it has been part of the community of Llangynwyd Middle.
