= Bacheldre =

Coordinates: 52.52°N 03.12°W

Bacheldre: Welsh: Bachelldref
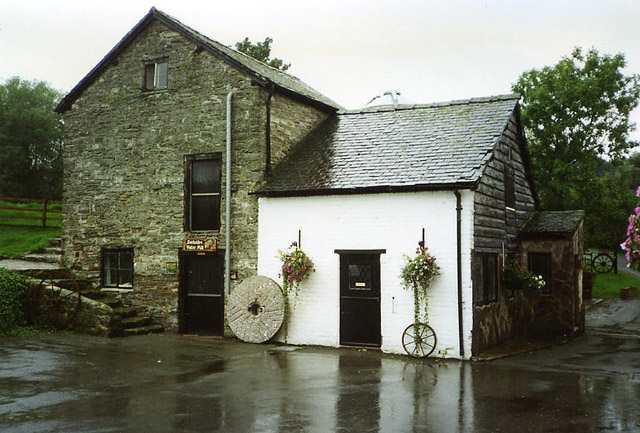
- Bacheldre Mill

- Location within Powys
- OS grid reference: SO2492
- Principal area: Powys
- Preserved county: Powys
- Country: Wales
- Sovereign state: United Kingdom
- Police: Dyfed-Powys
- Fire: Mid and West Wales
- Ambulance: Welsh
- UK Parliament: Montgomeryshire and Glyndŵr

Bacheldre (Welsh: Bachelldref or Bachelldre) is a small settlement in Powys, Wales. It is near the A489 road and is 5 kilometres (3 mi) southeast of the town of Montgomery.

== Location ==
The parish of Churchstoke is bisected by Offa's Dyke. Part of the parish lies in England and part of it in Wales, but the Dyke delineates only a segment of the boundary between England and Wales, which boundary also separates the counties of Powys and Shropshire. In this region of the Welsh Marches, there is a significant incursion of Wales east of Offa's Dyke, an area which includes Corndon Hill and the Churchstoke valley. The borderland parish of Church Stoke comprises nine areas, known as townships, one of which is Bacheldre, which lay in the former county of Montgomeryshire.

== Township ==
Bacheldre township runs, in round terms, to some 1500 acres (6.3 km^{2}). It lies wholly to the west of Offa's Dyke. On its eastern side the present English-Welsh border lies some miles to the east. Its northern boundary with the township of Brompton marks the current English-Welsh boundary, while a length of its south-western boundary follows the Kerry Ridgeway, an ancient trackway, which again marks today's English-Welsh boundary, and the whole of the southern boundary marks the boundary between Churchstoke and Mainstone parishes. Part of that boundary is shared with the adjoining township of Castlewright, which lies in Wales. (Again, like its neighbour Churchstoke, Mainstone parish falls partly in England and partly in Wales.) To the west of Bacheldre township lie the townships of Hopton Isaf and Hopton Uchaf.

== Description ==
George Mountford, in his article “Churchstoke and its Townships”, describes Bacheldre township as an area made up of woods, farmland and dwellings, and accounts for its cwms (dingles or valleys) and streams, the land rising towards the southern boundary. He writes “Between Offa’s Dyke on the one hand and Pentrenant on the other stretch 1,000 acres (4 km²) of first-rate agricultural land, divided up into well-known farms as Pentrenant, The Lake, Crow Wood, Bacheldre Hall and Bacheldre Farm”. In his paper, he includes a map of the township boundaries. This is also a map of Churchstoke parish in an article entitled “The Perambulation of the boundaries of Churchstoke Parish”.

== Etymology ==
Bacheldre is an anglicised placename form of the Welsh language word Bachelldre, meaning in Welsh placename terms ‘a farm on the bend or meander of a stream’, tre(f) denoting home, farmstead, or town(ship). (We note that the Caebutrach stream forms the northern boundary of the township, which is where we find Bachelldre Mill, not far distant from Bachelldre Hall and Bachelldre Farm.) Bachelldre(f) is the older, correct, form of the name, and is the spelling that will be employed below. In older written sources, a variant of the name is found. When the name is preceded by a preposition such as ‘O’ or ‘Yn’ the ‘B’ will mutate to 'F' or ‘M’, so we find ‘o Fachelldref’ ('from.. ') and ‘ym Machelldref’ ('in.. '). (As the ‘b’ may mutate to ‘f’ or 'm', we see too that the ‘t’ of ‘tref’ may mutate to ‘d’; also the last letter of ‘tref’ is not always preserved.)

== Lordship ==
Bachelldre lay in the manor of Overgorther (Welsh Gorddwr Uchaf, Gorddwr signifying land beyond the water of the River Severn and Uchaf meaning uppermost, or over, as opposed to Nethergorther), under the marcher lordship of Caus / Barony of Caus, which lordship covered an extensive area, embracing Bachelldre at its southern extremity. This Marcher lordship has been described as a semi-autonomous fief, the Corbets of Caus Castle (Welsh Cawrse) having consolidated great tracts of land, as did the Mortimers further to the south, who also had possession of Kerry (Ceri) to the west of Bachelldre. From Tudor times, one of the avenues open to the people of the Welsh Marches for the resolution of disputes, was the Council of Wales, which met at Ludlow. The power of the Lord Marchers to inflict capital punishment was taken away by the Statute of 27th Henry VIII (1536).

For a decade from 1536, Clun (or Clunnesland, meaning the whole district of country through which the River Clun passes from its rise on the north western side of the Clun Forest to its fall into the River Teme below Clungunford) formed part of Montgomeryshire. Bachelldre lay on the fringe of the lordship of Clun, Clun Forest running up to the Kerry Ridgeway (forest denoting a tract of country, often wooded or untilled, lying outside the manor, and regarded as a preserve for hunting). There were associations between the neighbouring areas, as between Clun and Ceri and, for a time, impropriate tithes were payable from Bachelldre to Clun. Further, Gwernygo, to the west of Bachelldre was a grange of Abbey Cwmhir, which lay in the former county of Radnorshire. Again, Hopton Grange, also a possession of Abbey Cwm Hir, but in Churchstoke parish, lay between Bachelldre and Gwernygo (Gwern-y-go(f), meaning Smith's Field). George Mountford, writing early in the last century, observes that it had been the practice for land in Hopton to be let with Bachelldre Hall.

== Literature ==
A lively Welsh culture with its bardic tradition flourished in this Welsh borderland, probably up to the mid-16th century. Odes in the Welsh language to families living at Bachelldre were written by a number of bards.

The poet Dafydd Bach ap Madog Wladaidd (fl. 1340–1390) wrote an appealing ode to Dafydd ap Cadwaladr, lord of Bachelldref entitled ‘A Christmas Revel’. It includes the lines ‘Heaven’s bounty on earth in Bachelldref, Where there is a revel each Christmas’, and is a rather longer poem than that by Deio ab Ieuan Du.

Deio ap Ieuan Du, the poet who flourished about 1450, composed a eulogy, said to be a masterly composition, also to Dafydd ab Cadwaladr of Bachelldre: Yn llwyr degwch nef / Yn llwr Bachelldref / Yn lle bydd dolef / Bod Nadolig (Where heaven's beauty is, below is Bachelldref, and the joyous shouting at every Christmas.)

The more famous poet, Lewis Glyn Cothi, writing about 1480 say, also addressed a poem to Gryffydd ab Howell, the grandson of the said Dafydd ap Cadwaladr, who also resided here. Lewis Glyn Cothi urges him, as a son of a warlike father, possessing the estate of his grandfather, Cadwaladr, to take up arms for Edward IV of England.

Owain ap Llywelyn ab y Moel, c.1485–1500, wrote an ode in praise of Cadwaladr ap Gruffudd of Bachelldref. An English translation is available here. (He also has poems to Gruffuyd ap Hywel and his son, of the neighbouring township of Brompton.) Cadwaladr ap Gruffudd, the subject of Owain's poem, is not of the same family line as Dafydd ap Cadwaladr who features in the earlier odes mentioned above. Dafydd ap Cadwaladr was descended from Sir Robert ap Madog, who married Joyce, daughter of Sir Peter Corbet of Caus.

== Heraldic visitations ==
At the end of the 16th century and in the early decades of the 17th century, notable genealogists, including Lewis Dwnn, Jacob Chaloner and Randle Holme, prepared pedigrees of more than one Bachelldre family. Definitive pedigrees have been published in Dr. Bartrum's extensive multi-volume Welsh Genealogies, which span a millennium.

In these pedigrees we find that of Edmond, son of Cadwaladr ap Gruffudd to whom Owain addressed his ode, including Edmond's offspring to the third generation. Owain alludes to Cadwaladr's descent from Philip (Ffylip) Dorddu, who was Gruffudd Dwn's father, the Dwns also being mentioned in the poem. (Philip Dorddu (black face or dark visage) held lands in Maelienydd, was linked with Heyhop (Heiob) Court near Knucklas, and was also associated with Bryndraenog near Beguildy. As the crow flies it is not many miles from Bryndraenog or Heyhop to Bachelldre, crossing the Kerry Ridgeway (Yr Hên Ffordd or Cefnfordd Ceri). Maelienydd made up most of north Radnorshire, and once included Ceri (Kerry) which lies to the west of Churchstoke parish.)

An account of this Bachelldre family, of Edmond (will 1543), his son Hugh ap Edmond (will 1599), and Hugh's son and heir Richard (died in 1624) is given in Welsh-border Surnames from 'ab Edmond' . This paper includes an extensive list of references to source material, including manorial records, wills, and deeds, and illustrations from Lewis Dwnn's and Jacob Chaloner's genealogical manuscripts.

Strategic marriages were made between families associated with Bachelldre. To give but one example, Philip Dorddu's sister Jonet married Robert ap Hywel, from whom Dafydd ap Cadwaladr, of the earlier Odes above, was descended.

== Surnames ==
The groundbreaking work of Guppy (H.B. Guppy "The Homes of Family Names in Great Britain" (London 1890)) illustrates the spread of the name Beamond and variants Beamand and Bemand from origins on the Welsh border into neighbouring English counties. He does not list these surnames for any English county other than Shropshire and Herefordshire.

The patronymic surname Beamond and variants, stem from the Bachelldre ‘ab Edmond’ family. A remarkable insight into the formation of this surname is given by Lewis Dwnn in his genealogical manuscript written c. 1600, showing in his Welsh style the development of the surname over three generations, viz. Iemwnt, Hugh ap Iemwnt, and Richard Bemwnt. Lewis Dwnn was essentially a contemporary of Richard of Bachelldre, who carried the surname Beamond, as in Jacob Chaloner's manuscript entitled "Beamond of Clunn". The Randle Holme pedigree of this family bears the endorsement “This descent of Beomond is thus in an ancient Rental of Castlewright Manor”, for we know that the Bachelldre family held lands in Castlewright (Castell-wrych also Castell Rhudd), and their family's origin was Welsh. There exist many documents relating to this family, including signatures revealing their use of their surname. We find that Hugh ap Edmond's earliest use of the surname Beamond stems from the mid to late 1570s.

T.E. Morris in his paper "Welsh Surnames in the Border Counties of Wales" identifies Beamond as a Welsh Surname, whilst The Oxford "A Dictionary of Surnames" (1988) recognizes that ‘Beamond’ may have a Welsh origin. A fuller account will be found at the link to Welsh-border surnames from ‘ab Edmond’, given above. The subject article was first published in The Journal of the National Library of Wales, in 1990.

== Historic buildings ==
A discussion of historic buildings in the area around Bachelldre is given in the Clwyd-Powys Archaeological Trust – Projects - Historic Landscapes – The Vale of Montgomery – Architectural Landscapes ( CPAT ) .

Peter Smith's “Houses of the Welsh Countryside” (The Royal Commission on Ancient and Historical Monuments in Wales) includes both Bachelldre Farm and Bachelldre Hall, the latter dated 1615.

Iorwerth C. Peate's “The Welsh House” includes an illustration of Bachelldre Hall, a half-timbered 'Elizabethan style’ house, from a woodcut by R.A. Maynard, (Figure 53).
