= Wiliam Llŷn =

Welsh poet (c. 1535–1580)

Wiliam Llŷn (c. 1535 – 1580) was a Welsh-language poet whose work largely consists of elegies and praise-poems. He is considered the last major Welsh poet of the bardic tradition, comparable to the greatest late-medieval Welsh poets, and has been called Wales's supreme elegist. Two of his poems are included in The Oxford Book of Welsh Verse.

== Life ==
That Wiliam Llŷn was born around 1534 or 1535 can be deduced from the fact, stated by his fellow-poet Rhys Cain, of his being not yet 46 at his death. That he came from the Llŷn Peninsula, or had some other family connection with it, is implied by the surname that both he and his brother, the poet Huw Llŷn, chose to take. He was instructed in the art of poetry by, among others, the bard Gruffudd Hiraethog, who was later recorded as believing that "There is nothing that Wiliam Llŷn does not know", and he was awarded the miniature silver chair at the 1567 eisteddfod as the best poet. By 1569 he was living in Oswestry – which, though in Shropshire, was still a largely Welsh-speaking town – with his wife Elizabeth. He belonged to the last generation of poets who wrote for members of the native aristocracy, finding patrons as far away as Brecknockshire and Anglesey, though most lived in the neighbouring counties of Merionethshire, Montgomeryshire, Denbighshire, and Caernarfonshire. His pupils included Morris Kyffin, Siôn Phylip and Rhys Cain. Apart from poetry, he was also involved in genealogy and heraldry; his surviving manuscripts include much genealogical information of the greatest value. He died in Oswestry on 31 August 1580, and was buried there.

== Poems ==
25 awdlau and 150 cywyddau by Llŷn survive, most of which are eulogies or elegies, with the genres of religious poem and love poem being each represented by only one example. He also wrote about a hundred englynion, in which religion and love are better represented. His elegies, seen as his greatest achievement, express vividly his sense of personal loss and the inescapability of man's fate. Taking a hint from Llywelyn Goch ap Meurig Hen's "Lament for Lleucu Llwyd", in which the poet addresses a dead woman as if she were living, some of Llŷn's elegies are cast as dialogues between the poet and the poem's subject. Especially notable are his elegies on his master, Gruffudd Hiraethog, and his fellow-bards Owain ap Gwilym and Siôn Brwynog, which are considered to be among the best poems of their kind in the Welsh language. Though his work is decidedly conservative, deeply indebted to the bards of the past, he nevertheless does show signs of the changing times, as in his familiarity with Greek poetry and possible espousal of Stoicism – both Renaissance characteristics – and in his heavy use of English loan-words.

== Evaluation ==
Historians of Welsh literature have long considered Wiliam Llŷn a poet of unusual excellence, especially as an elegist; he has, indeed, been called "the supreme elegist in the whole history of Welsh poetry". In the 19th century the Rev. Robert Williams judged that he "excelled all the bards of his time in sublimity of thought, and poetic fire", and Daniel Lleufer Thomas wrote that "he is generally considered the greatest Welsh poet in the period between Dafydd ab Gwilym and Goronwy Owen". Sir John Edward Lloyd in 1911 called him "one of the shining stars of Welsh poesy". In Gruffydd Aled Williams' opinion Llŷn was, with the doubtful exceptions of Siôn Tudur and Siôn Phylip, the only 16th-century professional bard comparable with the best medieval ones.

== Editions ==
The value of J. C. Morrice's edition of Wiliam Llŷn's works, Barddoniaeth Wiliam Llyn a'i Eirlyfr (Bangor: Jarvis a Foster, 1908) is vitiated by its inclusion of many love poems which are no longer attributed to him and its exclusion of many poems which are. A selection of his works, Wiliam Llŷn: Pen-Cerddor y Penceirddiaid (Aberystwyth: Cymdeithas Cerdd Dafod Cymru, 1980), was edited by Roy Stephens.

== Translations ==
Leaving aside extracts and englynion, there are few complete versions in English of substantial poems by Llŷn. The Elegy for Syr Owain ap Gwilym has been translated by both Tony Conran and Joseph P. Clancy, and the Lament for Gruffudd Hiraethog by Dafydd Johnston. An untitled and unattributed translation of an awdl addressed to a woman appears in Charles Wilkins' History of the Literature of Wales.
