= Anian =

Anian may refer to:

== People ==
- Anian (Bishop of Bangor), died 1306
- Anian I (Bishop of St Asaph) of the 13th century
- Anian II (Bishop of St Asaph) of the later 13th century

== Places ==
- The Strait of Anián, in the Northwest Passage

== See also ==
- Anianus (disambiguation)
- Einion
