= Gwilliam =

Gwilliam or Gwilliams may refer to:

- Gwilliam (surname)
  - Brad Gwilliam (born 1966), Australian rules footballer
  - Dianna Gwilliams (born 1957), educator
  - Edward Gwilliam, English footballer
  - George Gwilliam, English Aramaist
  - John Gwilliam (1923–2016), Welsh rugby union player and schoolteacher
- Gwilliam v West Hertfordshire Hospital NHS, English tort law case concerning occupiers' liability

== See also ==
- Gwilym, a related Welsh name
