= FRAS =

FRAS may refer to:

== Post-nominal ==
Post-nominal letters for:

- FRAS: Fellow of the Royal Astronomical Society
- FRAS: Fellow of the Royal Asiatic Society of Great Britain and Ireland
- FRAeS, Fellow of the Royal Aeronautical Society

== See also ==
- Fire Retardant Anti Static, an Australian mining material safety test
- Frasers Group, a British retails conglomerate (ticker symbol FRAS)
