= Ieuan Ddu ap Dafydd ab Owain =

Welsh poet (fl. 1440–1480)

Ieuan Ddu
- Born: Ieuan ap Dafydd ab Owain; Aberdare, Glamorgan, Wales
- Occupations: bard, bardic patron
- Writing career
- Language: Welsh

Ieuan Ddu ap Dafydd ab Owain (fl. 1440–1480), also known as Ieuan Dafydd Ddu and Ieuan Dafydd ab Owain, was a Welsh poet.

A number of surviving manuscripts contain cywyddau believed to have been the work of Ieuan, but the only certain example of his work appears to be the cywydd to his fellow bard, Ieuan Gethin. The first lines of some of his other writings are given in Moses Williams's Repertorium Poeticum, London, 1726, 8 vo.

As well as being remembered as an eminent poet, Ieuan was said to be "the gentleman of large estate" and a "great patron of the bards". While the name of this estate isn't recorded, local tradition states that it was the place known since the seventeenth century as Duffryn House (near Mountain Ash), and that Ieuan Ddu was an ancestor of the Bruce family. This tradition has been accepted as fact by many writers, including Iolo Morganwg.
