= Ieuan ap Hywel Swrdwal =

Ieuan ap Hywel Swrdwal (?1430 – ?1480) was a Welsh poet, from Norman stock. He composed primarily in Welsh, but was also responsible for the first known poem in the English language written by a Welshman. His father Hywel Swrdwal was also a poet, and there are doubts as to whether a number of extant works should be attributed to the father or to the son. He is reputed to have composed a history of Wales, but this has not survived.

The Hymn to the Virgin was written by Ieuan at Oxford in about 1470 and uses a Welsh poetic form, the awdl, and Welsh orthography; for example:

O michti ladi, owr leding/ tw haf
at hefn owr abeiding:
yntw ddy ffest efrlesting
i set a braents ws tw bring.

O, mighty lady, our leading/ to have
at heaven our abiding:
to bring us unto the everlasting feast
ye planted a branch (= of Jesse's tree).

The poem consists of 96 lines in 13 stanzas. It is an address to Christ through the Virgin Mary.

An alternative claim for the first poem in English written by a Welshman is made for John Clanvowe's The Book of Cupid, God of Love or The Cuckoo and the Nightingale, a long love poem based on The Owl and the Nightingale.
