= Fraas =

Fraas is a surname. Notable people with the surname include:

- Eberhard Fraas (1862–1915), German geologist and paleontologist, son of Oscar
- Karl Nikolas Fraas (1810–1875), German botanist
- Oscar Fraas (1824–1897), German paleontologist

== See also ==
- Fras (disambiguation)
