= Annianus =

Annianus may refer to:

- Titus Annianus (1st century), poet
- Pope Anianus of Alexandria (1st century), bishop
- Annianus of Alexandria (5th century), chronologer

== See also ==
- Anianus (disambiguation)
