= The COED Project =

The COED Project, or the COmmunications and EDiting Project, was an innovative software project created by the Computer Division of NOAA, US Department of Commerce in Boulder, Colorado in the 1970s. This project was designed, purchased and implemented by the in-house computing staff rather than any official organization.

== Intent ==
The computer division previously had a history of frequently replacing its mainframe computers. Starting with a CDC 1604, then a CDC 3600, a couple of CDC 3800s, and finally a CDC 6600. The department also had an XDS 940 timesharing system which would support up to 32 users on dial-up modems. Due to rapidly changing requirements for computer resources, it was expected that new systems would be installed on a regular basis, and the resultant strain on the users to adapt to each new system was perceived to be excessive. The COED project was the result of a study group convened to solve this problem.

The project was implemented by the computer specialists who were also responsible for the purchase, installation, and maintenance of all the computers in the division. COED was designed and implemented in long hours of overtime. The data communications aspect of the system was fully implemented and resulted in greatly improved access to the XDS 940 and CDC 6600 systems. It was also used as the front end of the - Free University of Amsterdam's SARA system for many years.

== Design ==
A complete networked system was a pair of Modcomps: one II handled up to 256 communication ports, and one IV handled the disks and file editing. The system was designed to be fully redundant. If one pair failed the other automatically took over. All computer systems in the network were kept time-synchronized so that all file dates/times would be accurate - synchronized to the National Bureau of Standards atomic clock, housed in the same building. Another innovation was asynchronous dynamic speed recognition. After a terminal connected to a port, the user would type a Carriage Return character, and the software would detect the speed of the terminal (in the range of 110 to 9600 bit/s) and present a log in message to the user at the appropriate speed. Due to limitations of the operating systems which came with the Modcomps, new Operating systems had to be created, CORTEX for the Modcomp II's and IV BRAIN for the Modcomp IV's.

== History ==
(Dates are approximate - from memory)

- 1970: First discussions of new communications system for XDS 940
- 1971: The COED Project was created
- 1972: The system was designed, funding was approved, a Request for Quote for the hardware was issued and executed
- 1973: The hardware components—2 Modcomp IV's and 2 Modcomp II's were delivered and installed and implementation began
- 1976: (April 8) First communication through COED to XDS 940 worked!
- 1979: project terminated

== Staff ==
Those involved in the original design meetings were: Ralph Slutz, George Sugar, Jim Winkelman and most of the COED implementors. Support was also provided by Tom Gray.

The COED implementors were: W. Schyler (Sky) Stevenson, Project Manager and operating system implementer Howard Bussey, Mark Emmer, David Lillie, and Vern Schryver. The 6600 interface to COED was implemented by Anthony Brittain, Dan Dechatelets and Kathy Browne.
