= Llangynwyd Castle =

Ruined castle in Llangynwyd, South Wales

Coordinates: 51.5852°N 3.6589°W

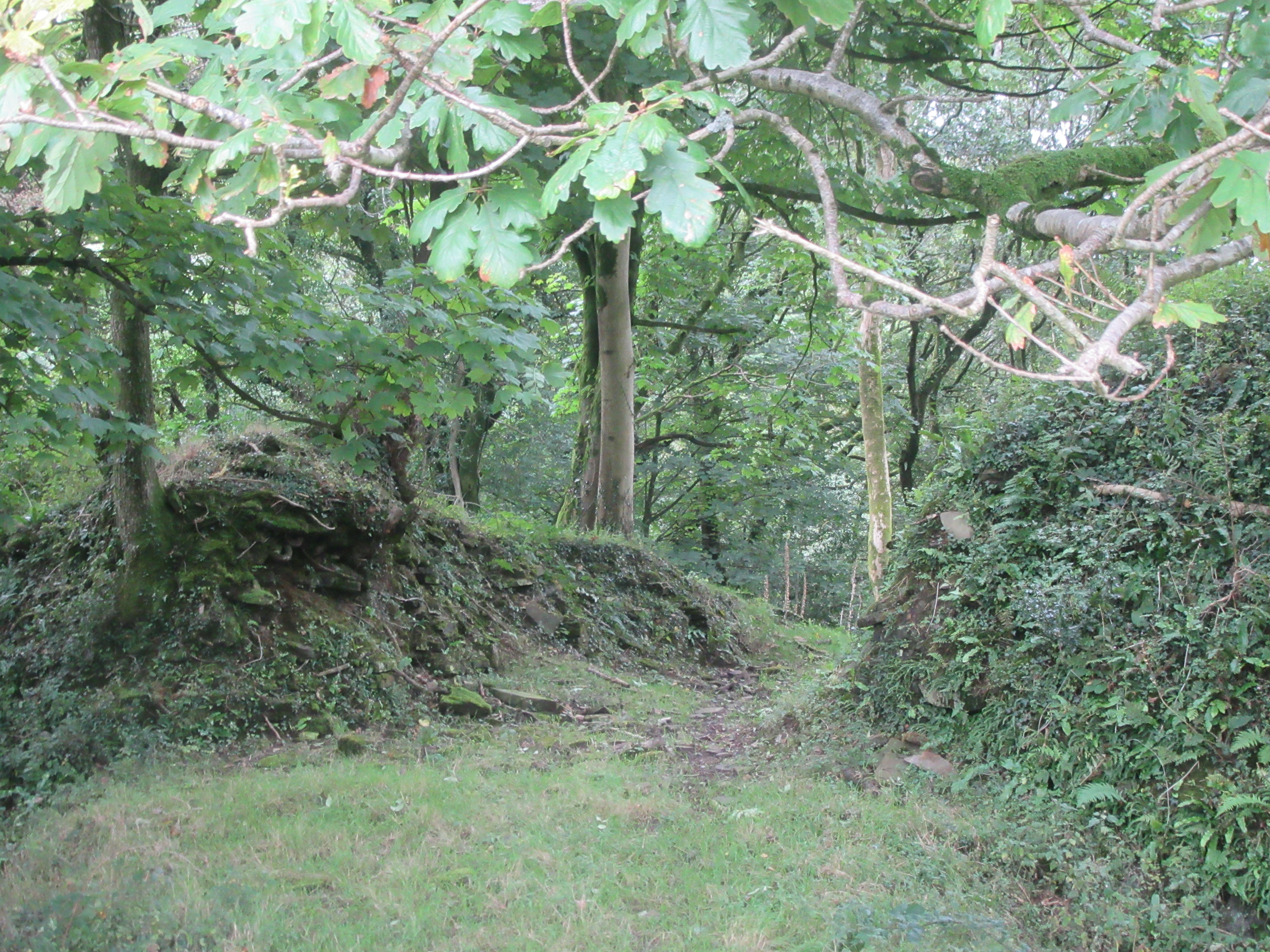
The ruinous northeastern approach to Llangynywyd Castle.

Llangynwyd Castle is a ruined castle, probably of the 12th century, in Llangynwyd, in Bridgend County Borough, South Wales, just to the south of Maesteg.

== History ==
In medieval times it was a prominent outpost in the Gorfynydd Cantref uplands of the lordship of Glamorgan, it is believed to have been annexed in around 1147, and it was mentioned in documents in 1246. The castle was plundered in 1258 and underwent a reconstruction but it was burned down in around 1293-4 and likely never rebuilt.

== Structure ==
The Royal Commission on the Ancient and Historical Monuments of Wales describes the ruined castle as occupying the "tip of a steep sided spur between two streams" and consisting of a "heart shaped walled inner court some 35-39m across set at the south-east end of a larger outer court". The twin-towered gatehouse overlooking the outer court was said to resemble that of the great gatehouse at Caerphilly Castle. It is believed to date to the time of the rebuilding in the 1260s.

The inner court is surrounded by a deep ditch, except on the northeastern side. The curtain wall around it is in a poorly degraded state, and possibly predates 1257. Several of the building foundations can still be seen in the interior. The passageway entering it consists of dressed stone.
