= Robert Williams (poet) =

Welsh poet (b. 1744 to d. 1815)

- Born: 1744
- Died: 1815 (aged 70–71)
- Occupation: Poet
- Children: Margaret, Jane, Elinor and Elizabeth
- Relatives: Dewi Havhesp
- Writing career
- Genre: Welsh poetry

Robert Williams was a Welsh poet who wrote most of his poems about agriculture and nature.

Roberts was born at Pandy Isaf, Tre Rhiwedog, Bala, but little else is known about his life.

He learned bardic conventions from the well-known teacher Rolant Huw (1714-1802), and himself taught the better known Ioan Tegid (John Jones, 1792-1852) and others. One of his pupils was his nephew, the hymn-writer William Edwards (1773-1853). He was also related to Dewi Havhesp.

Signing himself 'C.C.' ('Friend of the Cymmrodorion'), Williams wrote an elegy on the death of Richard Morris of Anglesey, and a cywydd on the subject of the Day of Judgement, which Rolant Huw considered in the same class as the work of Goronwy Owen and William Wynn of Llangynhafal on the same subject. He also wrote a poem to Dafydd Ionawr (David Richards), and exchanged englynion with Twm o'r Nant (Thomas Edwards). Most of his work is of local interest, carols, and 'club songs'.

Williams' elegy to the Methodist leader Peter Williams was one of only two works of his to be published, but selections from his work were printed by O. M. Edwards (Cymru Fydd, iv, 41-4; Cymru, ii, 210-3; Beirdd y Bala, 40-8), from whom most of the knowledge about his life comes. He was buried at Llanfor on 1 September 1815.
