= Gruffudd ap Nicolas =

Welsh landowner and patron

Gruffudd ap Nicolas or Gruffudd ap Nicholas (fl. ca. 1425–1456) was a powerful nobleman in Carmarthenshire, Wales. He organised several bardic eisteddfods in the county during the 1450s.

== Background ==
Gruffudd is believed to be the son of Nicolas ap Phylip ap Syr Elidir Ddu and his wife, Jennet, daughter of Gruffydd ap Llewelyn Foethus. However, it is not until 1425 that Gruffudd is first recorded, as the king's approver for the lordship and town of Dynevor. By 1436 he was sheriff of Carmarthenshire. By 1439 he was farmer of the lordship of Dynevor, together with his son John. His grandson was Sir Rhys ap Thomas.

By 1438 Gruffudd was a feared man, according to a petition to the English parliament by Margaret Malefant. Malefant had been so desperate to escape that, in her haste she had sped across South Wales into the arms of a man, so fast that he imagined to "ravysshe ye seide Margaret, and to have hure to hes wyf". A 17th-century history of his family describes Gruffudd's character, saying he was "hott, firie, and chollerick spiritt" though "verie wise he was, and infinitlie subtile and craftie, ambitiouse beyond measure, of a busie stirring braine".

== 1450s eisteddfods ==
The next eisteddfod in Wales after Lord Rhys's bardic festival of 1176, of any certainty, took place circa 1451 in Carmarthen, presided over by Gruffudd ap Nicolas. The dates and location are not certain. Some reports say it lasted two weeks and took place in Carmarthen but others say the event lasted 3 months and took place at Dynevor. Gruffudd wanted to emulate the Lord Rhys and, probably being a bard himself, wanted to strengthen the bardic tradition. A 'Cadair Arian' (Silver Chair) was awarded as a prize, to a bard from Flintshire, Dafydd ab Edmwnd, though poet Ieuan Llawdden accused Gruffudd of being bribed to bestow the award.

== Final years ==
Gruffudd was on good terms with King Henry VI of England, a member of the House of Lancaster. After the Lancastrians were defeated by Richard of York at the First Battle of St Albans in 1455, Gruffudd lost some of his lands. By June 1456 he was possibly the ‘Gruffith Suoh’ who was described as at war in Wales. Gruddudd's son's, Thomas and Owen, were granted general pardons in October 1456, but after that point Gruffudd ap Nicolas disappears from the records.
