= Dafydd ap Rhys o Fenai =

Dafydd ap Rhys o Fenai was a 16th-century Welsh poet from the Abergavenny area. Only one of his poems (written in praise of God) is known to survive.
