= Bennion =

Bennion is a surname from the Welsh "ab Einion". Notable people with the surname include:

- Alan Bennion (1930–2018), actor, portrayed Ice Lords in Doctor Who
- Chris Bennion (born 1980), Scottish-born footballer, who has mainly played for clubs in Ireland
- Francis Bennion (1923–2015), English barrister and author of texts on statutory interpretation
- Fred Bennion (1884–1960), American college sports coach
- Lowell L. Bennion (1907–1996), American educator
- Mervyn S. Bennion (1887–1941), American naval officer who died at Pearl Harbor
- Milton Bennion (1870–1953), American educator
- Phil Bennion (born 1954), British politician
- Ray Bennion (1896–1968), Welsh footballer
- Sam Bennion (1871–1941), British footballer
- Stan Bennion (1938–2013), British footballer
