= Sefnyn =

14th-century Welsh poet

Sefnyn was a Welsh language court poet from Anglesey, north Wales, who was active in the second half of the 14th century. He was probably the father of Gwilym ap Sefnyn (fl. c. 1440), who was also a poet.

Among works written by Sefnyn was an elegy for a fellow Anglesey poet, Iorwerth ab y Cyriog, who was active around 1360.
