= Dafydd ap Ieuan Llwyd =

Dafydd ap Ieuan Llwyd (fl. 1500) was a Welsh poet. He was from the Aberhafesp area of Montgomeryshire.
