= Phylip Brydydd =

13th-century Welsh poet

- Occupation: Court poet
- Relatives: Y Prydydd Bychan (possibly son)
- Writing career
- Language: Welsh
- Period: c. 1200–1225

Phylip Brydydd (fl. c. 1200–25) was a Welsh language court poet.

Phylip was poet to the court of Rhys Gryg, the Welsh prince who ruled part of the kingdom of Deheubarth.

Y Prydydd Bychan, who may have been his son, was also a court poet of Deheubarth.
