= Richard Hughes (poet) =

Richard Hughes (c. 1565 – 1619), known in Welsh as Dic Huws, was a Welsh-language poet originally from near Llanbedrog in the Llŷn Peninsula, north-west Wales, though most of his adult life was spent in England at the courts of Elizabeth I and James I. Some of his englynion, poems written in one of the Welsh strict metres, have survived, but he is better known for his love lyrics in the free metres. Three of his poems were selected by Thomas Parry for inclusion in The Oxford Book of Welsh Verse.

== Life ==
Richard Hughes was born around the year 1565 at Cefnllanfair, near Llanbedrog, Caernarfonshire (now Gwynedd). His father, Huw ap Rhisiart ap Dafydd, was a poet who presumably taught Richard something of Welsh prosody, and his family were also engaged in business in the neighbouring town of Pwllheli. He joined the English army in London, and it can be deduced from a poem of his that he was one of the 150 Caernarfonshire men who took part in the raid on Cadiz in 1596. In 1599 he became a footman to Queen Elizabeth, and was given an annuity of £50. His work displays an affection for the Queen which did not extend to all of her subjects. "An Englishman is human," concedes one of his englynion, "but no better friend than a dog". His connection with his second cousin, John Salesbury of Rug and Bachymbyd, who was in the retinue of the Earl of Essex, led to his being interrogated on suspicion of involvement in Essex's failed rebellion of 1601, but he survived this crisis and kept his job, not only for the remainder of Elizabeth's reign but into James I's. One contemporary source states that he remained a footman for the rest of his life. He wrote one of the commendatory verses that preface Coryat's Crudities (1611), suggesting that he was at least distantly associated with the English literary establishment of the day. He died at some point between February and May 1619. The poets Gruffudd Phylip of Ardudwy and Hugh Roberts each wrote an elegy on him. There is no evidence that he ever married or had children.

== Verse forms and influences ==
He is best-known for his poems in the free metres, but he is also known to have written in some of the strict metres, awdlau, cywyddau and englynion, of which however none have survived except some of the englynion. While the verse forms Hughes used were deeply rooted in the history of Welsh poetry, he also drew much from the English love lyric. This influence shows itself in his poems' feelings and in such images as the song of the dying swan and the cuckoo as a symbol of cuckoldry, and in conceits such as the use of echo. One of his poems, it is believed, is a translation from the English. The influence may not have all run one way: it has been suggested that Shakespeare knew and imitated Hughes' use of cynghanedd, the tightly regulated use of alliteration and internal rhyme.

== Themes and style ==
Though many of his free-metre poems deal with love's tribulations, often in the form of dialogue, the tone of his love poetry is light-hearted. He occasionally introduces a touch of satire, as in his englynion on low life in the taverns of Pwllheli, of which his somewhat Skeltonic englyn "The Dishonest Ale-Wife" is a good example. He also occasionally wrote on public events, such as the Gunpowder Plot and an illness of Queen Elizabeth. His free-metre poetry has been praised for its "supple style and lively language". It employs images drawn from nature, and in one case uses word music to imitate the song of the nightingale.

== Edition ==
- Lloyd, Nesta, ed. (1998). Ffwtman Hoff: Cerddi Richard Hughes Cefnllanfair. Llandybie: Cyhoeddiadau Barddas. ISBN 1900437279.

== English translations ==
- "Break of Day": Williams, Gwyn (1950). The Rent That's Due to Love: A Selection of Welsh Poems. London: Poetry London. p. 77.
- "The Dishonest Ale-Wife": Haycock, Marged (2024). "Ale-Wives in Welsh Poetry c. 1450 – c. 1650". In Flood, Victoria (ed.). Medieval Welsh Literature and Its European Contexts: Essays in Honour of Professor Helen Fulton. Bristol Studies in Medieval Cultures, 12. Woodbridge: D. S. Brewer. p. 23. ISBN 9781843847212.
- "For Cavendish And Drake you pictured their weakness": Williams, Gwyn (1953). An Introduction to Welsh Poetry: From the Beginnings to the Sixteenth Century. London: Faber and Faber. p. 222.
- "However great are the privilege and fame of London": Hunter, Jerry (13 October 2024). "Yr Hen Iaith, part fifty. A Poet in Two Worlds: Richard Hughes of Cefnllanfair". Nation Cymru.
- "The Old Man and the Soldier": Williams, Gwyn (1976). To Look for a Word: Collected Translations from Welsh Poetry. Llandysul: Gomer. pp. 157–160. ISBN 0850883563.
- "Song": Bell, C. C., in Bell, H. Idris (1913). Poems from the Welsh. Carnarvon: Welsh Publishing. pp. 26–27.
