= Fire Retardant Anti Static =

Fire Retardant Anti Static (FRAS) is a requirement for composite ventilation ducts used in underground mines, especially coal mines. The material must be conductive (anti-static as well as prevent propagation of a flame - fire retardant). The NSW Mine Safety Technology Centre can conduct tests if the material complies with the requirements for use in New South Wales, Australia.
