= Dewi Havhesp =

Welsh poet (1831-1884)

David Roberts
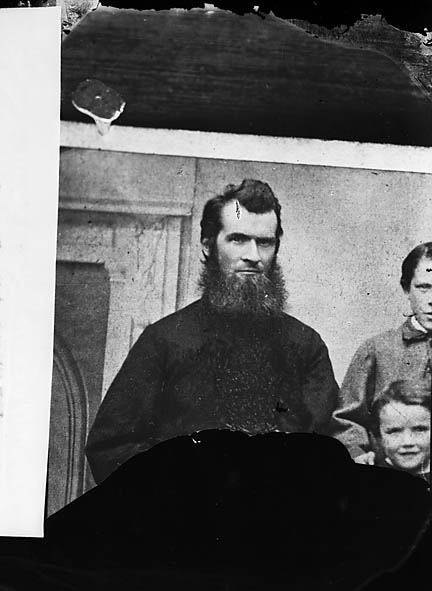
- Born: David Roberts; May 1831; Llanfor, Bala, North Wales, United Kingdom
- Died: August 1884 (aged 53); Bala, North Wales, United Kingdom
- Occupation: Poet
- Parent(s): Robert Roberts, Margaret Roberts
- Relatives: Robert Williams (poet), Gwilym Williams, William Edwards (hymnwriter)
- Writing career
- Language: English and Welsh
- Period: Victorian era
- Genre: Welsh poetry
- Notable works: Oriau'r Awen, 1877

David Roberts (1831–1884) was a Welsh poet known as ‘Dewi Havhesp’.

== Life ==
Born to a well known bardic family in May 1831 he spent his early years at 'Pensingrug' Llanfor, Bala, North Wales. He was the eldest of the eleven children of Robert and Margaret Evans, and through his mother, who was a granddaughter of William Edwards, he was related to the poet Robert Williams. He took his 'bardic name' Havhesp from the name of a stream near his boyhood home. He produced enough written poetry in the Welsh language to produce a book. The book Oriau'r Awen meaning Hours of Muse was first published in 1877, the most recent (3rd edition) was published in 1927. Much of his work was oral and therefore unrecorded. He died in August 1884 and is buried at Llandderfel in North Wales.

== Works ==
- Oriau 'r Awen gan Dewi Havhesp, published in Bala 1877
- Oriau 'r Awen gan Dewi Havhesp, reprinted in Bala 1927 with a personal history of the bard as an introduction.
