= Bleddyn Ddu =

Welsh poet

Bleddyn Ddu (c. 1200) was a Welsh poet. Some of his works were included in the ‘Red Book of Hergest’ - to God, and to the abbot of Aberconway.
