= Owain ap Llywelyn ab y Moel =

Owain ap Llywelyn ab y Moel (fl. 1470–1500) was a Welsh language poet from Powys.

The son of poet and rebel Llywelyn ab y Moel, twenty six of Owain ap Llywelyn ab y Moel's cywyddau are extant. An English translation of Owain ap Llywelyn ab y Moel's ode (number 11), in praise of Cadwaladr ap Gruffudd o Fachelldref, is given at Welsh-Border Surnames from 'ab Edmond' where it is entitled "Bardic Poem". And for Fachelldref, see Bacheldre.

== Bibliography ==
- Eurys Rolant (ed.), Gwaith Owain ap Llywelyn ab y Moel (Cardiff, 1984). The standard edition of Owain's poetry.
