= Llangynwyd =

Village in Wales

Coordinates: 51.586881°N 3.637943°W

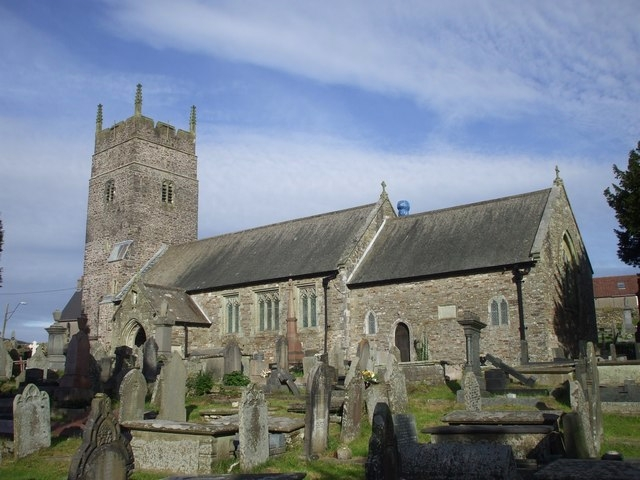
- St Cynwyd's Church, Llangynwyd

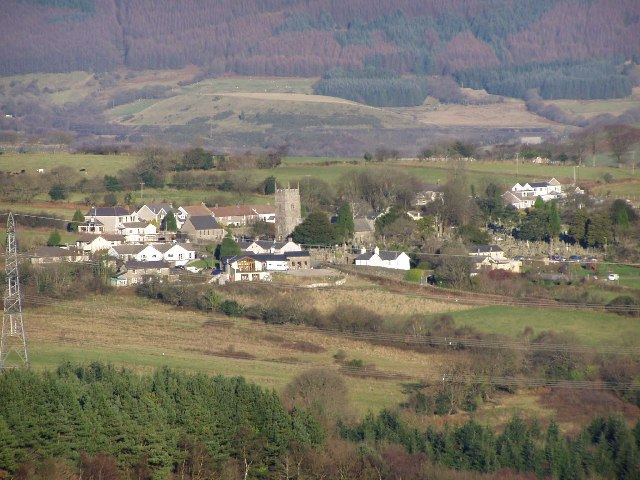
- Llangynwyd Village

- Location within Bridgend
- Population: 2,966 (ward.2021)
- OS grid reference: SS866888
- Community: Llangynwyd Middle
- Principal area: Bridgend
- Preserved county: Mid Glamorgan
- Country: Wales
- Sovereign state: United Kingdom
- Post town: MAESTEG
- Postcode district: CF34
- Dialling code: 01656
- Police: South Wales
- Fire: South Wales
- Ambulance: Welsh
- UK Parliament: Aberafan Maesteg
- Senedd Cymru – Welsh Parliament: Ogmore

Llangynwyd is a village (and electoral ward) 2 miles to the south of Maesteg, in the county borough of Bridgend, Wales. It was part of the medieval commote (Welsh: cwmwd) of Tir Iarll.

== History and amenities ==
The village is the site of Llangynwyd parish church, the ruins of Llangynwyd Castle and one of the oldest pubs in Wales (the Old House, dating from 1147.)

The place name Llangynwyd refers to the hilltop village with a church dedicated to St Cynwyd, son of Cynfelyn. The church was founded by St Cynwyd in the 6th century. All that remains of the original structure is the stone socket of a wooden cross, which can be seen in the wall above the entrance. The church was rebuilt in the 13th century and has since been restored several times. The square tower dates from the 15th century and was completely restored in 1893. The church has the biggest private cemetery in Europe.

The old village of Llangynwyd, "Top Llan", was the home of the legendary Maid of Cefn Ydfa, featured in the song "Bugeilio'r Gwenith Gwyn". It was also the home of the poet Wil Hopcyn, said to have written it. The antiquary T. C. Evans was born in the parish, as was the poet Evan Bevan.

The village still celebrates the New Year, or Calennig, with the Mari Lwyd: a horse's skull draped in a white sheet with flowers.

Today the "old" village of Llangynwyd is commonly referred to as "Top Llan" and the more recent and much larger adjoining village is simply called "Llangynwyd"

== Education ==
The village is home to Llangynwyd Primary School, built in 1911, and to Bridgend's first Welsh-language comprehensive school, Ysgol Gyfun Gymraeg Llangynwyd, which takes pupils from the county borough's four primary schools that teach in Welsh: Ysgol Cynwyd Sant, Ysgol Bro Ogwr, Ysgol y Ferch o'r Sgêr and Ysgol Cwm Garw.

== Ward ==
Llangynwyd is also the name of the electoral ward which covers the village. The ward is coterminous with the community of Llangynwyd Middle. The ward elects one county councillor to Bridgend County Borough Council.
