= Y Prydydd Bychan =

Y Prydydd Bychan (fl. c. 1222–68) was a medieval Welsh language court poet. His personal name is unknown. His father was the poet Phylip Brydydd. Prydydd was a grade of court poet, and bychan here has the meaning "junior" (somebody's son) rather than the more usual "small" or "little", presumably to distinguish him from his father.

His surviving work is a small number of poems addressed to the princes of Deheubarth, in south Wales.
