= Gwilym Went =

Welsh cricketer

Gwilym Went (25 March 1914 – June 2005) was a Welsh cricketer. He was a right-handed batsman and leg-break bowler who played for Glamorgan. He was born in Barry and died in Braintree.

Went, who played club cricket for Barry, made a single first-class appearance for Glamorgan, during the 1934 season, against Gloucestershire. From the tailend, he scored 14 not out in the first innings in which he batted, and a duck in the second.
