= Gwerful Mechain =

Welsh poet (fl. 1460–1502)

- Born: Mechain, Kingdom of Powys
- Occupation: Poet
- Years active: fl. 1460–1502
- Known for: Erotic poetry

Gwerful Mechain (fl. 1460–1502), is the only female medieval Welsh poet from whom a substantial body of work is known to have survived. She is known for her erotic poetry, in which she praised the vulva among other things.

== Life ==
Gwerful Mechain lived in Mechain in Powys. Little is known of her life, but it is generally accepted that she was a descendant of a noble family from Llanfechain.

Her father was Hywel Fychan of Mechain in Powys, her mother was named Gwenhwyfar, and she had at least four siblings (three brothers and a sister). She married John ap Llywelyn Fychan and had at least one child, a daughter named Mawd.

== Work ==
She is perhaps the most famous female Welsh-language poet after Ann Griffiths (1776–1805), who was also from northern Powys. Her work, composed in the traditional strict metres, including cywyddau and englynion, is often a celebration of religion or sex, sometimes within the same poem.

Probably the most famous part of her work today is her erotic poetry, especially Cywydd y Cedor ("Poem to the Vagina"), a poem praising the vulva. In it, she upbraids male poets for celebrating so many parts of a woman's body but ignoring "the girl's middle". "Let songs to the quim grow and thrive", she adjures her readers. "Noble bush, may God save it".

She actively participated in the poetic culture of her day. Many of her surviving poems are examples of ymrysonau (poetic or bardic rivalry) with contemporaries such as Dafydd Llwyd of Mathafarn, Ieuan Dyfi and Llywelyn ap Gutun.
