= William Birchinshaw =

Welsh poet

William Birchinshaw (fl. 1584–1617) was a Welsh poet believed to be from the Denbighshire area. Morris Kyffin was one of his contemporaries. References are made to him in a letter by William Myddelton, who describes him as a 'wandering minstrel'.
