= Eifion =

Eifion may refer to:

Places:

- Eifion (UK Parliament constituency) in Caernarfonshire, Wales
- Lôn Eifion, part of Lôn Las Cymru, the Welsh National Cycle Route

A Welsh given name:

- Eifion Jones (1925–2004), Welsh marine botanist
- Eifion Jones (cricketer) (born 1942), Welsh cricketer
- Eifion Lewis-Roberts (born 1981), Welsh international rugby union player
- Eifion Williams (born 1975), Welsh footballer
- Eliseus Williams (Eifion Wyn) (1867–1926), Welsh language poet
