= Gwilym ab Ieuan Hen =

Gwilym ab Ieuan Hen (fl. ca. 1440–1480) was a Welsh-language poet during the time of the Beirdd yr Uchelwyr, the professional "Poets of the Nobility".

In common with other poets of the era, some of his work consists of praise-poems addressed to his patrons. These included Gruffudd ap Nicholas, an esquire prominent in the administration of South Wales, who was also praised by Lewys Glyn Cothi and Dafydd ab Edmwnd; Dafydd ap Ieuan ab Owain of Caereinion; and Dafydd Llwyd ap Dafydd ab Einion of Newtown. He also produced some fine elegies, religious verse and love poems: 27 works attributed to him have been preserved in manuscript, though not all are certainly by him.

Despite many of his poems being preserved, almost nothing is known of Gwilym's life. Ieuan Gethin, a contemporary, composed a somewhat sarcastic elegy on Gwilym's father Ieuan, a thatcher who died after falling off a roof.

Gwilym's works were edited in 1992 by A. Eleri Davies along with those of Deio ab Ieuan Du.
