= Dafydd Alaw =

Dafydd Alaw (fl. 1550) was a Welsh poet about whom little is known. He is thought to have been a native of the Isle of Anglesey and a bardic disciple of Lewys Môn (as he commemorated him in an elegy). His surviving works (c. 1535–70) are mainly cywyddau and awdlau which praise members of some of the principal county families of Anglesey.
