= Betty Co-ed =

Betty Co-ed may refer to:

- "Betty Co-ed", a 1930 song recorded by Rudy Vallée, which reached #4 on the charts
- Betty Co-ed (1931 film), a 1931 Screen Songs animated short that featured a flapper character that had some similarities to Betty Boop
- Betty Co-Ed a.k.a. The Melting Pot, a 1946 film featuring Shirley Mills

== See also ==
- Betws-y-Coed, a village in the Conwy valley, Wales
