= Adda Fras =

Welsh poet and writer of prophecies

Adda Fras (fl. 1240) was a Welsh poet and writer of prophecies. Though he is mentioned in a number of texts, little of his own work survives. In Dafydd ap Gwilym a'i gyfoeswyr 156, he is associated with Casnodyn. He is buried in Maenan Abbey, near Conwy.
