= Cadwgan Ffôl =

Welsh poet

Cadwgan Ffôl was a 13th-century Welsh poet. Little is known about him, and little of his work is thought to survive. The transcription of a poem commemorating a victory by the Welsh over the English fought at Degannwy (Iolo Morganwg manuscripts) has been attributed to him, but other historians have attributed it to Ednyfed Fychan.

His family name was Cadwgan ab Cynvrig and in Henry Blackwell (N.L.W. M.S. 9253), he is associated with the date 1280.
