= Tudur ap Gwyn Hagr =

Welsh poet

Tudur ap Gwyn Hagr (fl. second half of the 14th century) was a Welsh-language poet from south-west Wales.

== Bibliography ==
- R. Iestyn Daniel (ed.), Gwaith Dafydd y Coed a beirdd eraill o Lyfr Coch Hergest (Aberystwyth, 2002). ISBN 0-947531-71-8
