= Arofan =

7th Century Welsh language poet

Arofan was a 7th Century Welsh language poet.

Nothing of Arofan's work survives. However, his name is recorded as the Welsh Triads as the bard of Selyf ap Cynan:

"Arouan vard Sele(v) ap Kynan"

Arofan's name is later recorded in the work of Cynddelw Brydydd Mawr, where he is held in regard alongside Afan Ferddig:

"Gnavd canaf y volyant ual auan uertic
neu uartwavd arouan"
