= Edward Gwilliam =

English footballer

Personal information
- Full name: Edward Gwilliam
- Date of birth: 7 July 1877
- Place of birth: Madeley, Shropshire, England
- Date of death: 1954 (aged 76–77)
- Position: Inside forward

Senior career*
Years	Team	Apps	(Gls)
1894–1899	Shrewsbury Town		
1899–1901	Wellington Town		
1901–1902	Wolverhampton Wanderers	2	(1)
1902	Wellington Town		
Total		2	(1)
- * Club domestic league appearances and goals

Edward Gwilliam (7 July 1877–1954) was an English footballer who played in the Football League for Wolverhampton Wanderers.
