= Gwilym Rhyfel =

Gwilym Rhyfel (fl. 12th century) was a Welsh-language poet and warrior.

Gwilym's surviving work are poems of intercession to Dafydd ab Owain Gwynedd.

Gwilym's name also comes down through history in the work of Gruffudd ap Gwrgenau and Iorwerth Beli (14th century) who name Gwilym as one of the four chief poets of his era, alongside Llywarch ap Llywelyn ("Prydydd y Moch"), Cynddelw and Dafydd Benfras.

== Bibliography ==
- J. E. Caerwyn Williams (ed.), 'Gwaith Gwilym Rhyfel', in Gwaith Dafydd Benfras ac eraill o feirdd hanner cyntaf y drydedd ganrif ar ddeg (University of Wales Press, Cardiff, 1995).
