= Cneppyn Gwerthrynion =

13th-century Welsh poet and grammarian

Cneppyn Gwerthrynion (c. 13th century) was a Welsh poet and grammarian.

None of Cneppyn's work has survived although his name is recorded by Gwilym Ddu o Arfon as among a number of poets of renown in his own elegy to Trahaearn. Cneppyn's name is also recorded in a manuscript Pum Llyfr Kerddwriaeth ('The five books of poetic art') as a grammarian.
