= Llywarch Llaety =

Llywarch Llaety (fl. c. 1140–1160) was a Welsh-language court poet.

A single poem by Llywarch survives, the earliest text of which is found in the Hendregadredd manuscript, in praise of Llywelyn ap Madog, son and heir of prince Madog ap Maredudd of Powys.

It is possible that Llywarch Llaety is the same person as the poet Llywarch y Nam who also composed a poem in honour of Llywelyn ap Madog.

== Bibliography ==
- Nerys Ann Jones (ed.), 'Gwaith Llywarch Llaety', in Kathleen A. Bramley et al. (eds.), Gwaith Llywelyn Fardd I ac eraill o feirdd y ddeuddegfed ganrif (University of Wales Press, 1994).
