= COED (website) =

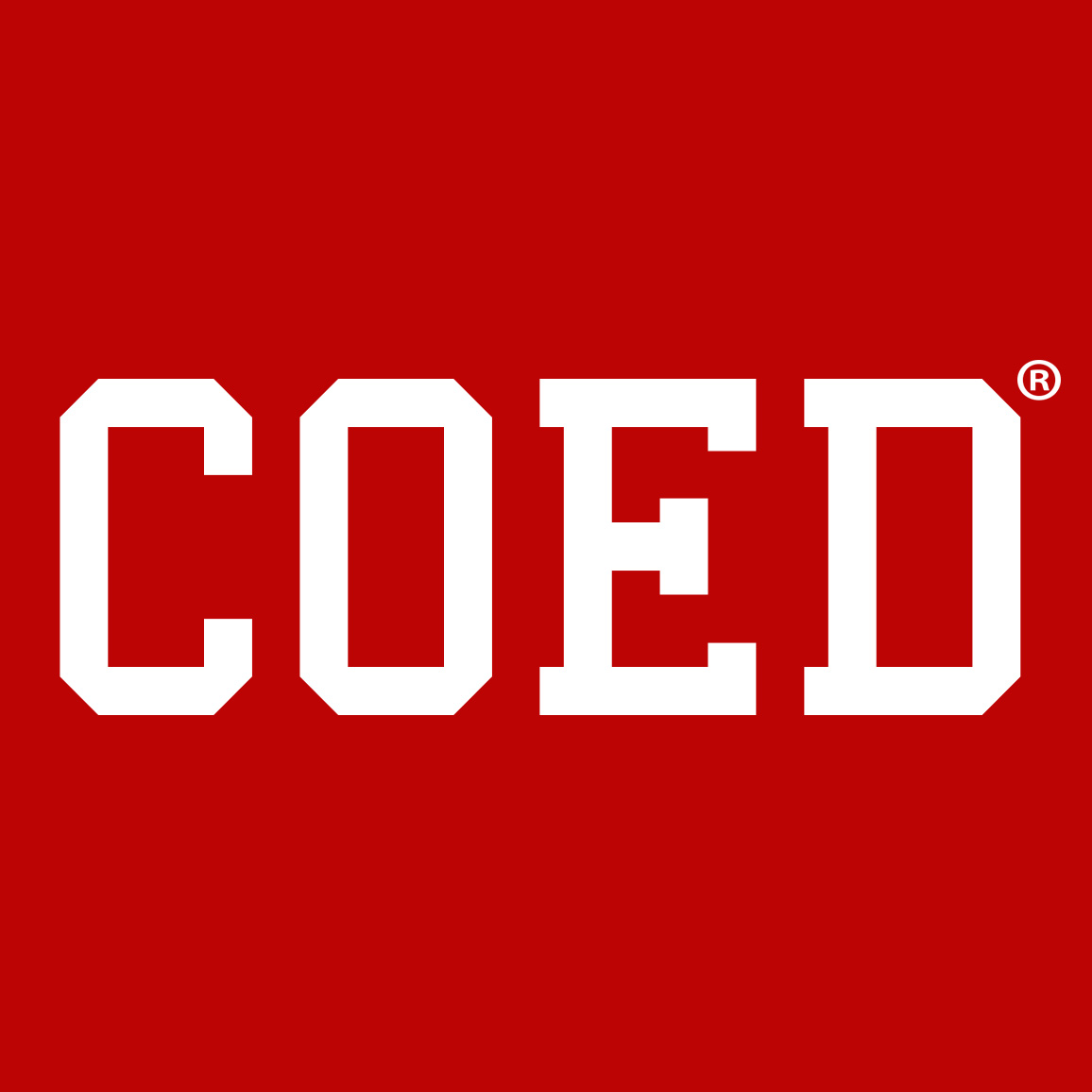
- Company type: Private
- Website type: News & Entertainment
- Available in: English
- Founded: 2004
- Headquarters: New York City, {{{location_country}}}
- Owner: COED Media Group
- Creator: David Liebler
- Key people: Josh Sanchez, Editor-in-Chief
- Website: coed.com
- Current status: Active

COED is a news, entertainment, sports, and lifestyle website. Originally a print magazine, COED shifted towards online publication exclusively in 2007. The content is primarily targeted at college-aged men and written by college-aged writers. The website contains news and interviews as well as photography of female celebrities. Posts from COED are featured in publications such as The Huffington Post and Maxim.

In addition to college-related material, the website features entertainment news, interviews, and technology news. The website has an annual competition referred to as Miss COED. The competition features women attending colleges across America and began as a way to win a spread in the print version of the magazine. Previous winners have included Playboy Playmates Amanda Paige, Jessica Ashley, Tiffany Toth, and MMA fighter Ashley Salazar.
