= Ieuan Dyfi =

- Born: 1461
- Died: after 1502
- Occupation: Poet

Ieuan Dyfi (c. 1461? – after 1502?) was a Welsh language poet.

== Poetry ==
Very little information has survived relating to Ieuan and his poetry. Ieuan composed five poems to a woman named "Anni Goch" in one of which he accuses how false women have been throughout history. Recent research has shown that Ieuan Dyfi was brought before a church court, where he admitted adultery with Anni, a married woman. His poems about Anni provoked Gwerful Mechain to respond with her poem "I Ateb Ieuan Dyfi am gywydd Anni Goch".
