= Gwyn Jones (author) =

British writer

- Born: 24 May 1907
- Died: 6 December 1999 (aged 92)
- Occupations: Writer, scholar
- Writing career
- Notable works: Translations of various Norse sagas; A History of the Vikings

Gwyn Jones CBE (24 May 1907 – 6 December 1999) was a Welsh novelist and story writer, and a scholar and translator of Nordic literature and history.

== Personal life and academic career ==
Gwyn Jones was born on 24 May 1907 in New Tredegar, Monmouthshire, the second child of George Henry Jones (1874–1970), a miner, and his second wife, Lily Florence, née Nethercott (1877–1960), a midwife. He was brought up in nearby Blackwood. He attended Tredegar county school and studied at University College, Cardiff as an undergraduate and a postgraduate.

After six years he was a schoolteacher in Wigan and Manchester, in 1935 he returned to University College, Cardiff as a lecturer. In 1940 was appointed Professor of English of the University College of Wales, Aberystwyth, where he taught until his appointment as Professor of English at University College, Cardiff in 1964, a position he held until his retirement in 1975.

In 1939 Jones registered as a conscientious objector to military service, which temporarily caused him to lose his job. Jones was a socialist, although never a member of the Labour Party, and was sympathetic to the aims of Plaid Cymru. He was an active Christian and attended Minny Street Chapel in Cardiff, a Welsh-language congregational chapel.

Jones married twice: in 1928 to Alice Rees (1906/7–1979), and 1979 to Mair Jones, née Sivell (1923/4–2000), the widow of Thomas Jones, his collaborator on The Mabinogion.

== Literary work ==
Jones' translations include Four Icelandic Sagas (1935), The Vatndalers' Saga (1944), The Mabinogion (1948, in collaboration with Thomas Jones), Egil's Saga (1960), Eirik the Red and Other Icelandic Sagas (1961) and The Norse Atlantic Saga (1964). He also wrote A History of the Vikings (1968) and Kings, Beasts, and Heroes (1972).

In addition to his translations, he was an author in the Anglo-Welsh tradition. His novels and story collections include Richard Savage (1935), Times Like These (1936), The Nine Days' Wonder (1937) and Garland of Bays (1938), The Buttercup Field (1945), The Flowers beneath the Scythe (1952), Shepherd's Hey (1953) and The Walk Home (1962).

Jones also founded The Welsh Review in 1939, which he edited until 1948; this journal was important for raising discussion of Welsh issues and for attracting submissions from such authors as T. S. Eliot and J. R. R. Tolkien, whose Breton lay, The Lay of Aotrou and Itroun, he published in 1945. He continued to support Welsh literature by chairing both the Welsh Committee of the Arts Council of Great Britain and the first editorial board of The Oxford Companion to the Literature of Wales. In 1977 he edited the Oxford Book of Welsh Verse in English. He also published three sets of lectures on Anglo-Welsh literature: The First Forty Years (1957), Being and Belonging (1977), and Babel and the Dragon's Tongue (1981).

== Honours and commemorations ==
In 1963 Jones was awarded the Knight's Cross of the Order of the Falcon by the President of Iceland, followed by the Commander's Cross in 1987. He was appointed CBE in the 1965 New Year Honours in recognition of his chairmanship of the Welsh Arts Council. In 2008 a commemorative plaque to Jones was unveiled in the Hugh Owen library of Aberystwyth University.

== Selected publications ==
=== Novels ===
- Richard Savage (1935)
- Times Like These (1936; new edition 1979)
- The Nine Days’ Wonder (1937)
- Garland Of Bays (1938)
- The Flowers Beneath the Scythe (1952)
- Shepherd's Hey (1953)
- The Walk Home (1962)

=== Short Stories ===
- The Buttercup Field and Other Stories (1945)
- The Still Waters and Other Stories (1948)
- Selected Short Stories (1974)
- Collected Stories (1997)

=== Other ===
- Welsh Legends and Folk-Tales (1955)
- The First Forty Years (1957)
- Scandinavian Legends and Folk-Tales (1961)
- The Norse Atlantic Saga (1964)
- The Legendary History of Olaf Tryggvason (1968)
- A History of the Vikings (1968)
- Kings, Beasts and Heroes (1972)
- Being and Belonging (1977)
- Babel and the Dragon's Tongue (1981)
- Tales from Wales (2001)

=== As Editor ===
- Welsh Short Stories (1956)
- The Oxford Book of Welsh Verse in English (1962)
- Twenty-Five Welsh Short Stories (1971)
