= Rhisiart ap Rhys =

Rhisiart ap Rhys (fl. c. 1495 – c. 1510) was a Welsh-language poet from the cwmwd of Tir Iarll, Glamorgan.

He was the son of Rhys Brydydd and nephew, in all probability, to the poet Gwilym Tew. 36 of his poems are extant.

== Bibliography ==
- Eurys I. Roland (ed.), Gwaith Rhys Brydydd a Rhisiart ap Rhys (Cardiff, 1976)
