= Dafydd y Coed =

Welsh poet

Dafydd Y Coed was a 14th-century Welsh poet. He is thought to have lived in South Wales. His surviving works include a number of awdlau, and some shorter (satirical) poems, such as those which feature in the Red Book of Hergest (a 14th-century compilation of Welsh prose and poetry).
