= Tir Iarll =

Traditional name for part of Glamorgan, Wales

Coordinates: 51.561°N 3.670°W

Tir Iarll (Welsh for 'Earl's Land'; Welsh pronunciation: [ˌtiːr ˈjarɬ]), is the traditional name of an area of Glamorgan, Wales, which has long had a particular resonance in Welsh culture.

In medieval times Tir Iarll was a cwmwd covering the present-day parishes of Llangynwyd, Betws, Cynffig and Margam. It long preserved traditional customs, notably the Mari Lwyd or Grey Mare.

The late medieval Welsh poets Rhys Brydydd, his son Rhisiart ap Rhys and brother (or son) Gwilym Tew all came from Tir Iarll.
