= Madog ap Gwallter =

Madog ap Gwallter (fl c. 1250) was a medieval Welsh language poet.

It is thought that Madog was a Franciscan friar who lived in the middle of the 13th century. He is noted for having composed the earliest surviving poem on the Nativity of Christ in Welsh (Geni Iesu or Mab a'n rhodded). He also composed an ode to God and many short poems (englynion) to the Archangel Michael. While categorized as among the Gogynfeirdd, Madog ap Gwallter presents more homely figures in the Nativity poem. The theological knowledge in the ode to God suggests training, supporting the suggestion that he was a friar. The Franciscans are also believed to have been prevalent in Wales by 1237, the year of the establishment of the house at Llan-faes.

The poet was a native of Llanfihangel, as mentioned in the englynion to the Archangel Michael. A Latin text from the late 13th century Cardiff claims that Geoffrey of Monmouth translated Welsh poems praising the ancient British kings, the author of which calls himself 'Frater Walensis madocus edeirnianensis'. Certain scholars argue that this poet is therefore Friar Madog ap Gwallter, stating his origins as in Edeirnion, known to have been mistakenly equated to Llanfihangel Glyn Myfyr.

Only three of Madog's poems have survived. The texts of two of these poems can be found in the Red Book of Hergest.

== References and bibliography ==
- Rhian M. Andrews (ed.), 'Gwaith Madog ap Gwallter', in Gwaith Bleddyn Fardd a beirdd eraill ail hanner y drydedd ganrif ar ddeg (Cardiff, 1996). The standard text.
- Andrew Breeze, Two Bardic Themes: The Virgin and Child, and Ave-Eva, Medium Aevum (Society for the Study of Mediaeval Languages and Literature, 1994)
- Sir Ifor Williams (B.B.C.S., iv, 133–4)
- Henry Lewis, Hen Gerddi Crefyddol, Cardiff, 1931
- D. Myrddin Lloyd, 'Y Brawd Fadawg ap Gwallter a'i Gan i'r Geni', Y Tyst, 25 Dec. 1947 (reprinted in the journal of the Welsh Folk-Song Society, Canu Gwerin, in 1992).
- "MADOG ap GWALLTER, friar, a religious poet". Dictionary of Welsh Biography. National Library of Wales.
