= Rhys Brydydd =

Welsh poet

Rhys Brydydd (fl. mid-15th century) was a Welsh language poet from Tir Iarll, Glamorgan, south Wales.

Only four of his compositions survive, all of them cywyddau.

== Personal life ==
He was either the brother or father of Gwilym Tew and the father of the poet Rhisiart ap Rhys.

== Bibliography ==
- Eurys I. Rowlands (ed.), Gwaith Rhys Brydydd a Rhisiart ap Rhys (Cardiff, 1976)
