= Anianus =

Anianus may refer to:

- Pope Anianus of Alexandria, Patriarch of Alexandria from 62 to 83
- Anianus (referendary), of the Breviary of Alaric
- Anianus (writer), 5th-century Egyptian monastic writer
- Anianus of Celeda, early 5th-century deacon and supporter of Pelagius
- Aignan of Orleans, also known as Anianus, Bishop of Orléans, canonized
- A 4th century bishop of Besançon

== See also ==
- Annianus (disambiguation)
