= Morus Dwyfech =

Morus Dwyfech (fl. c. 1523–1590) – otherwise, Morus ap Dafydd ab Ifan ab Einion – was a Welsh-language poet. He was domestic bard to the Griffith family at Cefnamlwch on the Llŷn Peninsula in Gwynedd and took his bardic name from the River Dwyfech (now known as the Dwyfach).
