= Einion Wan =

Welsh poet

Einion Wan (fl. 1230–1245) was a Welsh-language court poet whose surviving poems include elegies to Llywelyn the Great and Madog ap Gruffydd "Maelor" ap Madog, Prince of Powys Fadog.
