= Einion ap Gwgon =

Einion ap Gwgon (fl. c. 1215) was a court poet in the Welsh language. His sole surviving poem is a eulogy to Prince Llywelyn ap Iorwerth (Llywelyn the Great) of Gwynedd.
