= Lewys Môn =

Welsh poet

Lewys Môn (fl. 1485 – 1527) was a Welsh-language poet, one of the Beirdd yr Uchelwyr (Poets of the Nobility), from the cwmwd (commote) of Llifon on Ynys Môn (now Anglesey), north Wales. About 110 of his poems survive, mostly traditional praise poems and elegies for members of the Welsh gentry, especially of north Wales.

His will was proved on 28 June 1527, and an elegy for him was written by Dafydd Alaw

== Bibliography ==
- Eurys Rowlands (ed.), Gwaith Lewys Môn (Cardiff, 1979). The standard edition of Lewys' poetry.
