= Iorwerth Beli =

Iorwerth Beli (fl. second half of 14th century) was a poet who wrote in the Middle Welsh language. Very little is known of his life.

Iorwerth's only surviving poem expresses his disdain of the Bishop of Bangor (possibly Anian Sais, died 1327), who showed a preference for itinerant musicians over professional poets, and for English-speaking poets over Welsh.

== Bibliography ==
The edited Welsh text of Iorwerth's surviving poem, with notes, can be found in: N. G. Costigan (Bosco) et al., Gwaith Gruffudd ap Dafydd ap Tudur, Gwilym Ddu o Arfon, Trahaearn Brydydd Mawr ac Iorwerth Beli (Aberystwyth, 1995) ISBN 0-947531-24-6.
