= Deio ab Ieuan Du =

Welsh poet

Deio ab Ieuan Du (fl. 1460–1480) was a Welsh language poet from Ceredigion, west Wales.

Deio composed eulogies to the nobility of the area, including Gruffydd Fychan, a supporter of Jasper Tudor.

His works were edited in 1992 by A. Eleri Davies along with those of Gwilym ab Ieuan Hen.

== See also ==
Deio ab Ieuan Du at Wikisource

== Bibliography ==
A. Eleri Davies (ed.), Gwaith Deio ab Ieuan Du a Gwilym ab Ieuan Hen (University of Wales Press, 1992)
