= Hywel Swrdwal =

Hywel Swrdwal (fl. 1430 – 1475) was a poet in the Welsh language from Machynlleth, Powys.

Hywel composed poems on themes of patriotism and religion. He was the father of two sons, Ieuan ap Hywel Swrdwal and Dafydd ap Hywel Swrdwal.

== Bibliography ==
- Williams, J. E. Caerwyn. "Swrdwal, Hywel". Oxford Dictionary of National Biography (online ed.). Oxford University Press. doi:10.1093/ref:odnb/48652. (Subscription or UK public library membership required.)
