= Ieuan Gethin =

Welsh poet

Ieuan Gethin ap Ieuan ap Lleision (fl. c. 1450) was a Welsh language poet, of Baglan, Glamorgan.

== Biography ==
Ieuan Gethin was of noble descent, tracing his lineage back to the family of Caradog ap Iestyn ap Gwrgant. According to genealogists such as Gruffudd Hiraethog, he married the daughter of Tomas ab Ifor Hael.

He maintained a court at Baglan where bards from both North and South Wales were entertained. Two cywyddau addressed to him written by Ieuan Ddu ap Dafydd ab Owain and Iorweth Fynglwyd remain preserved in manuscript.

== Poetry ==
- A cywydd written in praise of Owain Tudor during his period of imprisonment at Newgate Prison.
- An elegiac cywydd mourning the deaths of his children, which includes a diatribe against the plague that killed them.
- A cywydd addressed to his son.
- An awdl dedicated to one of his daughters.

== Historical misconception ==
The 18th-century antiquarian Iolo Morganwg claimed that Ieuan Gethin took part in a Glamorgan military campaign in support of Owain Glyndŵr, subsequently escaped to Anglesey, and later returned upon the payment of a fine. This account has been proven fictitious.
