= Gwilym Tew =

Welsh poet

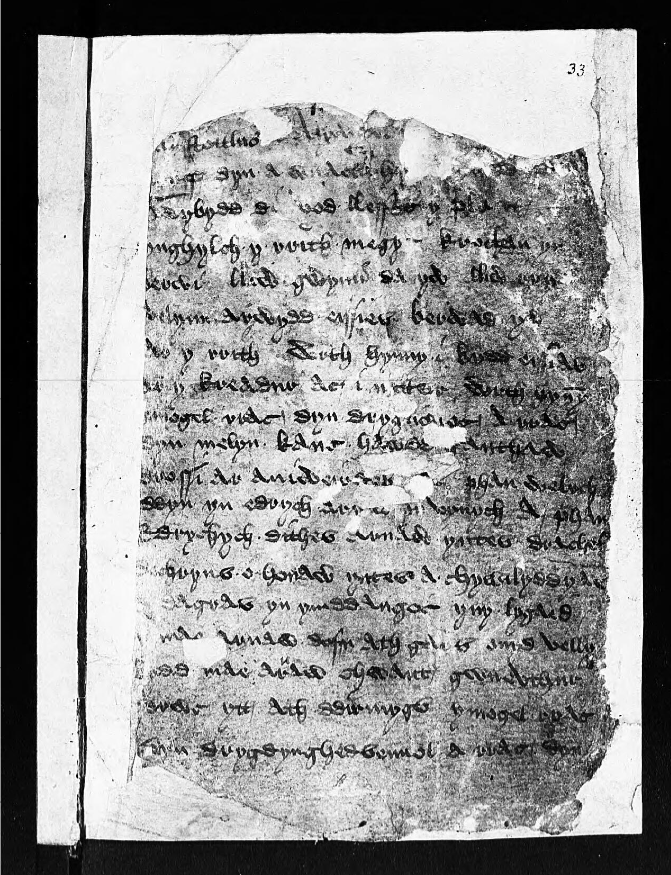
Page 33 of Peniarth MS 51 (Llyfr Gwilym Tew). In July 2010, the Peniarth Manuscripts Collection was included on the UNESCO UK Memory of the World Register.

Gwilym Tew (fl. 1460 – 1480) was a Welsh-language poet and manuscript copyist from Tir Iarll, Glamorgan.

It is probable that his father was the poet Rhys Brydydd and that another poet of the same family, Rhisiart ap Rhys, was his nephew.
