= Siôn Phylip =

Siôn Phylip (1543–1620) was a Welsh-language poet from the Ardudwy region of Gwynedd. In 1568, Sion was ordained as a master poet at the second Caerwys Eisteddfod.

One of his works was en elegy composed for the poet Morus Dwyfech.
