= Gruffudd ap Maredudd ap Dafydd =

Welsh poet (fl. 1352–1382)

Gruffudd ap Maredudd ap Dafydd (fl. 1352 – 1382) was a Welsh bard working in Anglesey in the service of the Tudors of Penmynydd. One of the last of the older school of poets known as the Gogynfeirdd, he resisted the innovations in Welsh verse-form which took place in his lifetime. About 2400 lines of his work have survived in the Red Book of Hergest. His best-known poem is "Gwenhwyfar", an elegy to a young lady. He was described by the literary historian D. Myrddin Lloyd as "the finest of all the late Gogynfeirdd poets" and by Saunders Lewis as "one of the greats".

== Life ==
Gruffudd ap Maredudd came from a landowning family in Anglesey, and is himself recorded to have been part-owner of the townships of Aberalaw, Carneddawr and Dronwy in the commote of Talybolion. He was also sheriff of Talybolion. As a poet he was closely associated with the Tudors of Penmynydd, and can indeed be described as their family bard. He is known to have been active from 1352 to 1382, but his date of death is unknown.

== Work ==
Gruffudd's style largely follows the practice of his predecessors, the 12th- and 13th-century Gogynfeirdd, rather than that of his contemporaries, the Poets of the Nobility. The verse-forms he employed were the time-honoured englyn and awdl rather than the comparatively new cywydd. However he differed from the earlier Gogynfeirdd in making much use of the complicated system of alliteration known as cynghanedd, and even of the very demanding double cynghanedd sain. His most common themes are the beauty of women, clothes and the Anglesey countryside, and the pathos of the deaths of beautiful people cut down in the joy of their youth. His poems are remarkable for their great breadth of reference to older Welsh, and even Irish, literature and legend.

Gruffudd worked in a wide range of genres. He wrote eight praise-poems, seven of them being addressed to the Penmynydd family, namely Tudur ap Goronwy; his brother Hywel, archdeacon of Anglesey; and Tudur's son Goronwy. The eighth is written to a patron who has not been identified. He also composed fifteen works on religious subjects, including poems of praise to God, a plea for God to spare Gwynedd from the Black Death, and a poem on the Rood of Chester which has been described as a masterpiece and as one of the most ambitious poems of its time. (Note: An English translation of this poem appears as an appendix in Barry J. Lewis, Welsh Poetry and English Pilgrimage: Gruffudd ap Maredudd and the Rood of Chester (Aberystwyth: Canolfan Uwchefrydiau Cymreig a Cheltaidd Prifysgol Cymru, University of Wales Centre for Advanced Welsh and Celtic Studies, 2005).) Several of his religious poems are addressed to the Virgin Mary, a fact which marks him out from the earlier Gogynfeirdd. Gruffudd's other works include two love poems, an elegy for Hywel y Fwyall, a political poem supporting Owain Lawgoch in his plans to liberate Wales from the English, and four satires which have been called "technically adept but quite repellent". The best known of his works is "Gwenhwyfar", an elegy (or possibly four related elegies) for a beautiful lady who died while still young. This has been translated, either in whole or in part, several times. The scholar Simon Rodway called it one of the best poems of the period; D. Myrddin Lloyd wrote of it that "Seldom has the horror of early death been expressed with such skill and anguish combined, and this poem ranks high among the finest achievements of Welsh verse." (Note: Joseph P. Clancy translated this poem in his The Earliest Welsh Poetry (London: Macmillan, 1970), 183–188, and in his Medieval Welsh Poems (Dublin: Four Courts Press, 2003), 256–261.)

== Editions ==
- Jones, Glenda (1990). Gwaith Gruffudd ap Maredudd ap Dafydd (PhD). University of Wales, Aberystwyth.
- Lewis, Barry J.; Owen, Ann Parry, eds. (2003–2007). Gwaith Gruffudd ap Maredudd. Aberystwyth: Canolfan Uwchefrydiau Cymreig a Cheltaidd Prifysgol Cymru.
