= Siôn Tudur =

Siôn Tudur (also John Tudur, c. 1522–1602) was a 16th-century Welsh language poet.

After serving as a yeoman in the courts of Edward VI and Mary, Siôn returned to Wales where he was tutored by Gruffudd Hiraethog. Siôn's surviving work consists of poems in praise of nobility, poetic rendering of psalms, and his concerns on contemporary Welsh society.
