= Welsh poetry =

Type of poetry

Welsh poetry refers to poetry of the Welsh people or nation. This includes poetry written in Welsh, poetry written in English by Welsh or Wales-based poets, poetry written in Wales in other languages or poetry by Welsh poets around the world.

== History ==
Wales has one of the earliest literary traditions in Northern Europe, stretching back to the days of Aneirin (fl. 550) and Taliesin (second half of the 6th century), and the haunting Stafell Cynddylan, which is the oldest recorded literary work by a woman in northern Europe.

The 9th-century Canu Llywarch Hen and Canu Heledd are both associated with the earlier prince Llywarch Hen.

Welsh poetry is connected directly to the bardic tradition, and is historically divided into four periods. The first period, before 1100, is known as the period of Y Cynfeirdd ("The earliest poets") or Yr Hengerdd ("The old poetry"). It roughly dates from the emergence of the Welsh language from Common Brittonic in the sixth century to the arrival of the Normans in Wales towards 1100. The second period, the period of the "Poets of the Princes" (Beirdd y Tywysogion, also called Y Gogynfeirdd), lasted from about 1100 until 1350, or until 1282, the date of the overthrow of Llywelyn. The final classical period of Welsh poetry, referred to as the period of the Poets of the Nobility (Beirdd yr Uchelwyr) or simply Cywyddwyr, lasted from 1350 to 1600. These included Dafydd ap Gwilym and Iolo Goch, and they produced many cywyddau. There was a lull in the production of poetry after the union with England in the 16th century. The year 1600 is generally taken to mark the beginning of modern Welsh poetry.

Throughout this time, serving as a bard was one of the few ways that one might better oneself socially, by becoming either a chief poet or a household poet. Both of these categories of bards could achieve status through a grading system, with the lowest being a minstrel (who was technically an ungraded bard), the lowest graded status of a disciple, a graduated disciple of poetry, a disciplined disciple, a disciple of chief-poet-craft, and finally a chief poet.

The earliest poem in English by a Welsh poet dates from about 1470. More recently, Anglo-Welsh poetry has become an important aspect of Welsh literary culture, as well as influencing English literature.

The works of the great hymn writers of the 18th and 19th centuries are also poetic: in particular William Williams Pantycelyn and Ann Griffiths. Around 1900, there was a renaissance in Welsh-language poetry with poets such as T. Gwynn Jones. Other notable writers were T. H. Parry-Williams and D. Gwenallt Jones; and around 1950 others such as Waldo Williams. Many poets in the late 20th century produced work of a high standard, many of them in cynghanedd.

Welsh poets often write under bardic names to conceal their identity in Eisteddfod competitions.

== See also ==
- List of Welsh-language poets (6th century to c. 1600)
- British poetry
- British literature
- Welsh-language literature
- List of Welsh-language authors
- Welsh literature in English
