= Gwyn Williams (writer) =

Welsh poet, novelist and translator

Professor David Gwyn Williams, usually known simply as Gwyn Williams (24 August 1904 – 24 December 1990) was a Welsh poet, novelist, translator and academic.

Born in Port Talbot, he was educated at the University College of Wales and Jesus College, Oxford. As an academic he taught at Cairo, Alexandria where he first became Professor of English Literature, Benghazi, and Istanbul. While in Egypt he befriended a number of expat writers including Lawrence Durrell. In Egypt he began to work on translations of Welsh poetry into English, pioneering works which were published during the 1950s. On his retirement in 1969 he returned to Wales and concentrated on writing, producing a series of novels, four travel books (including one in Welsh), and numerous other works. A fluent Welsh-speaker, he was a committed member of Plaid Cymru.

His friend John Ormond, produced his well-regarded 1972 and 1974 series on Welsh history, The Land Remembers, for the BBC, which was accompanied by his book of the same title.

His autobiography, ABC of (D.) G. W, was published in 1981, while his Collected Poems, 1936–86 were published in 1987. Williams died in 1990 in Aberystwyth. His diaries of family life in Mynydd Bach were published as Summer Journal 1951.

== Bibliography ==
- The Rent That’s Due to Love: an anthology of Welsh poetry (Letchworth: The Garden City Press, 1950).
- An Introduction to Welsh Poetry (London: Faber and Faber, 1953).
- In Defence of Woman by William Cynwal. Translated by Gwyn Williams, engravings by John Petts London: Golden Cockerel Press, undated c.1955).
- This Way To Lethe (London: Faber and Faber, 1962) (novel).
- Green Mountain: an informal guide to Cyrenaica and its Jebel Akhdar (London: Faber and Faber, 1963).
- Turkey: A Traveller’s Guide and History (London: Faber and Faber, 1967).
- Inns of Love (Swansea: Christopher Davies, 1970) (poems).
- The Avocet (Swansea, Christopher Davies, 1970) (novel).
- Eastern Turkey: a guide and history (London: Faber and Faber, 1972).
- Welsh Poems: sixth century to 1600 (London: Faber and Faber, 1973).
- Foundation Stock (Llandysul: Gomer Press, 1974) (poems).
- Twrci a’i Phobl (Caerdydd: Gwasg Y Dref Wen, 1975).
- Two Sketches of Womanhood (Llandybie: Christopher Davies, 1975) (novellas).
- Troelus a Chresyd (Llandysul: Gwasg Gomer, 1976).
- To Look for a Word: collected translations from Welsh poetry (Llandysul: Gomer Press, 1976).
- The Land Remembers: a view of Wales (London: Faber and Faber, 1977).
- An Introduction to Welsh Literature (Cardiff: University of Wales Press, 1978).
- Choose Your Stranger (Port Talbot: Alun Books, 1979) (poems and translations).
- Y Ddefod Goll (Port Talbot: Llyfrau Alun, 1980) (poems, and translations into Welsh from Turkish).
- Person and Persona: Studies in Shakespeare (Cardiff: University of Wales Press, 1981).
- ABC of (D)GW: a kind of autobiography (Llandysul: Gomer Press, 1981).
- Y Cloc Tywod ((Talybont: Y Lolfa, 1984) (novel).
- Collected Poems 1936–1986 (Llandysul: Gomer Press, 1987).
- Flyting in Egypt: the story of a verse war 1943–45 told by Gwyn Williams (Port Talbot: Alun Books, 1991).
- An Introduction to Welsh Literature (revised edition) (Cardiff: University of Wales Press, 1992).
- Summer Journal 1951 (Aberystwyth: Planet, 2004) (edited and introduced by Teleri Williams and Lowri Gwilym).
