= Madog Benfras =

Madog Benfras (i.e. Madog "Greathead") (fl. 1340) was a Welsh poet. He is otherwise known from involvement in legal cases at Wrexham in 1340.

== Life and works ==
He was a son of Gruffydd ab Iorwerth of Marchwiail, and had two brothers; Llywelyn Llogell (Marchwiail parish priest), and Ednyfed. The so-called "Brodyr Marchwiail" from Marchwiel played a part in a 14th-century revival of Welsh poetry. Iolo Morganwg cites their teacher as Llywelyn ap Gwilym of Emlyn. Madog Benfras has also been associated with the "Eisteddfods of the Renaissance", where he allegedly won a chair and wreath of birch for his love poem. He was a friend of Dafydd ap Gwilym. Dafydd introduced him into one of his poems as the priest of his mock marriage with Morfudd. They composed elegies for each other, and though few of Madog's poems remain, many of those surviving were love poems.
