= Casnodyn =

Welsh poet

Casnodyn (fl. first half of the 14th century) was a Welsh-language poet born in Gilfai, near present-day Swansea, south-west Wales.

== Bibliography ==
- R. Iestyn Daniel (ed.), Gwaith Casnodyn (Aberystwyth, 1999). The only complete edition of Casnodyn's poetry.
