= Dafydd Bach ap Madog Wladaidd =

Dafydd Bach ap Madog Wladaidd, also known as Sypyn Cyfeiliog (fl. 1340–1390), was a Welsh-language poet. Dafydd composed love poems and poems in praise of nobility. His most famous poem is Croeso mewn Llys ("A Welcome in a Court"), composed in honour of a welcome he received.

== See also ==
Sypyn Cyfeiliog at Wikisource
