= Llawdden =

Llawdden (or Ieuan Llawdden) (fl. 1440–1480) was a Welsh language poet and a Roman Catholic priest.

Llawdden composed poems to many prominent noble families.

He is noted for his inauguration in the Eisteddfod held at Carmarthen attended by Dafydd ab Edmwnd. In 1450 at the Carmarthen Eisteddfod, he accused Gruffudd ap Nicolas of being bribed to give the Bardic Chair to Dafydd ab Edmwnd.
