= Llywelyn Goch ap Meurig Hen =

14th-century Welsh poet of the cywydd style

Llywelyn Goch ap Meurig Hen (fl. c. 1350–1390) was a Welsh language court poet from Merionethshire, in the north west of Wales.

Llywelyn is credited, along with Iolo Goch, with introducing and popularizing the cywydd metre in the north of Wales.

Llywelyn is particularly noted for his elegy to his dead mistress, Marwnad Lleucu Llwyd (Elegy for Lleucu Llwyd).

== Bibliography ==
- Dafydd Johnston (ed.), Gwaith Llywelyn Goch ap Meurig Hen (University of Wales Centre for Advanced Welsh and Celtic Studies, 1998)
