= The Snow (poem) =

Medieval Welsh poem

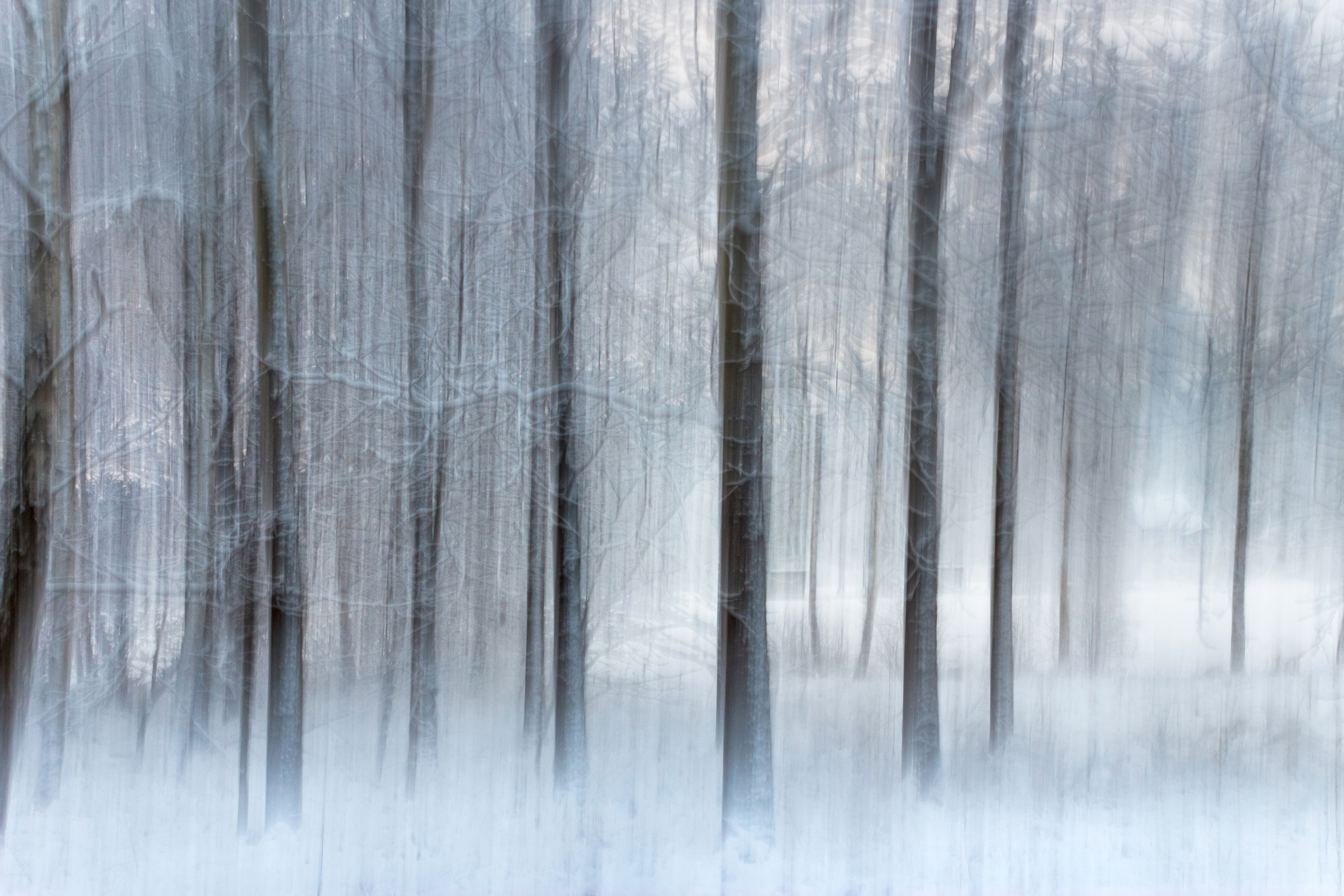

"The Snow" (Welsh: Yr Eira or Cywydd yr Eira) is a 14th- or 15th-century Welsh-language poem in the form of a cywydd evoking a landscape which, to the poet's chagrin, is covered with snow. It has been described as an imaginative tour de force. Manuscripts of the poem mostly attribute it to Dafydd ap Gwilym, widely seen as the greatest of the Welsh poets, though some name Dafydd ab Edmwnd or Ieuan ap Rhys ap Llywelyn as the author. Modern literary historians have differed as to whether it is indeed by Dafydd ap Gwilym, but the two most recent editions of his poems (by Thomas Parry and Dafydd Johnston respectively) have rejected it. The poem has nevertheless remained popular with translators and it continues to appear in anthologies, including Thomas Parry's own Oxford Book of Welsh Verse and Gwyn Jones's Oxford Book of Welsh Verse in English.

== Synopsis ==
The poet laments that he cannot leave the house because when he does he is covered with snow; everyone has been so covered since New Year's Day. Snow has whitewashed the ground and covered the trees with fur. What will God do with all this now, these bees of Heaven, these fleeces, these white angels? The poet invites us to "See the taking from the bottom of the flour-loft a plank." and further compares the snow to, among other things, quicksilver, a cloak, cement, and "a pavement vaster than sea's graveyard". The earth has had its brains spilled out. Who will bring it all to an end? Where is the rain?

== Manuscripts and recensions ==
"The Snow" survives in 46 manuscripts. Among the earliest are British Library Additional MS 14967 (after 1527), Peniarth 49 (16th/17th century, written by John Davies), Cardiff MS 4.330 (1574, written by Thomas Wiliems), and Cardiff MS 2.114 (1564-1566, written at the court of Rowland Meyrick). There are two main recensions of the poem, one beginning with the words Ni allaf, "I cannot", and one beginning Ni chysgaf, "I will not sleep". A third recension, evidenced by fewer manuscripts, begins Ni cherddaf, "I will not walk".

== Attribution ==
A large majority of the surviving manuscripts of this poem, including Cardiff MS 4.330 and Peniarth MS 49, mentioned above, attribute it to Dafydd ap Gwilym. However, two of them, including the very earliest, BL Add. MS 14967, assign it to Ieuan ap Rhys ap Llywelyn, and another two to Dafydd ab Edmwnd with the suggestion that it might be Dafydd ap Gwilym's; both Ieuan ap Rhys and Dafydd ab Edmwnd lived at least a century after Dafydd ap Gwilym's time. "The Snow" was included in the 1789 collection of Dafydd's works, Barddoniaeth Dafydd ab Gwilym, and was attributed to Dafydd in a selection of cywyddau edited by Ifor Williams and Thomas Roberts in 1914, but Thomas Parry excluded it from his 1952 edition, citing as objections the poem's simplicity of style and language and its very sparing use of cynghanedd sain, a complicated system of alliteration and internal rhyme, and of sangiad, the breaking up of syntax by interpolating a word or phrase into a line. Its style, he summed up, was exactly that of the 15th century, and he favoured the claims of Ieuan ap Rhys, though when he included it in his Oxford Book of Welsh Verse (1962) he labelled it as an anonymous 15th century poem. Parry's rejection of the poem from the Dafydd ap Gwilym canon proved very controversial and provoked many protests from other scholars, notably in two papers by D. J. Bowen. Nevertheless, the most recent edition of his poems, by Dafydd Johnston and others, again excluded "The Snow".

== Language and metaphor ==
"The Snow" is only one of a number of poems attributed to Dafydd ap Gwilym on elemental themes, such as the mist, the moon, and the stars. They allow the poet to display his mastery of dyfalu, unstructured sequences of metaphorical epithets used to compare the subject of the poem to any number of other things. In particular, he compares these inanimate subjects to aspects of human activity – flour falling through the hole in a loft floor, feathers being plucked from a goose, and so on – thereby bringing them down to earth. Some of the metaphors used in "The Snow" can be paralleled elsewhere. Snow, for example, is called "flour" in a cywydd by the 14th-century bard Llywelyn Goch ap Meurig Hen, and is given the epithet "chaff-heap" not just in "The Snow" but in Dafydd ap Gwilym's poem "The Wind" and in various Old English and Old Norse works. At one point "The Snow" compares its subject to the white "bees from heaven", a reference to the legend, recorded in the Welsh Laws, that bees were white until they were expelled from Paradise along with Adam. It also makes a rare and valuable reference to medieval Welsh drama when it tells us that "feathers settle on the gown like an actor playing a dragon". In English mummers' plays one actor would similarly wear a cloak of feathers in imitation of a dragon's scales. Though the poem's language is Middle Welsh it includes several loanwords taken from Middle English, namely blanc, 'plank'; lifft , 'lift'; paement, 'pavement'; simant, 'cement'; simwr, 'chimere'; and sym, 'sum, total'. It also uses the words llurig ystaen, from Latin lorica, 'breastplate', and estanum, 'tin'.

== English translations and paraphrases ==
- Bell, H. Idris, in Bell, H. Idris; Bell, David (1942). Fifty Poems. Y Cymmrodor, vol. 48. London: Honourable Society of Cymmrodorion. pp. 275, 277, 279. With the Middle Welsh original in parallel text.
- Clancy, Joseph P. (1965). Medieval Welsh Lyrics. London: Macmillan. pp. 150–151.
- Fulton, Helen, ed. (1996). Selections from the Dafydd ap Gwilym Apocrypha. Llandysul: Gomer Press. pp. 112, 114. ISBN 185902310X. With the Middle Welsh original in parallel text.
- Green, Martin (1993). Homage to Dafydd ap Gwilym. Lewiston/Queenston/Lampeter: The Edwin Mellen Press. pp. 7–8. ISBN 0773493182.
- Gurney, Robert, ed. (1969). Bardic Heritage. London: Chatto & Windus. pp. 104–106. ISBN 0701113286.
- Heseltine, Nigel, ed. (1968) [1944]. Twenty-Five Poems by Dafydd ap Gwilym. Banbury: Piers Press. pp. 12–13. ISBN 9780950355801.
- Humphries, Rolfe (9 February 1952). "Dafydd ap Gwilym Resents the Winter". The New Yorker. p. 55. Abridged translation.
  - Repr. in Humphries, Rolfe (1954). Poems: Collected and New. New York: Charles Scribner. pp. 290–291.
- Jackson, Kenneth Hurlstone, ed. (1971) [1951]. A Celtic Miscellany. Harmondsworth: Penguin. pp. 77–78. ISBN 9780140442472.
- Johnes, Arthur James (1834). Translations into English Verse from the Poems of Davyth ap Gwilym. London: Henry Hooper. pp. 89–90.
- Parry, R. Williams, in Llwyd, Alan, ed. (1998). Cerddi R. Williams Parry: Y Casgliad Cyflawn 1905–1950. Dinbych: Gwasg Gee. p. 239. ISBN 0707403154.
- Thomas, Gwyn, ed. (2001). Dafydd ap Gwilym: His Poems. Cardiff: University of Wales Press. pp. 310–311. ISBN 0708316646.
- Watson, Giles (2014). Dafydd ap Gwilym: Paraphrases and Palimpsests. npp: pp. pp. 162–163. ISBN 9781291866803.
