= Evan Evans (poet) =

Welsh scholar and poet (1731–1788)

Evan Evans (20 May 1731 – 4 August 1788) (bardic name Ieuan Fardd, also known as Ieuan Brydydd Hir) was a Welsh-language poet, clergyman, antiquary and literary critic.

Evans, son of Jenkin Evans, was born at Cynhawdref, in the parish of Lledrod, Cardiganshire. He received his education at the grammar school of Ystrad Meurig, under the scholar and poet Edward Richard. He moved to Oxford, and entered Merton College in 1751 but left without graduating. He had conveyed a small freehold in Cardiganshire to his younger brother for £100, in order to support himself at the university.

By 1754 he had been ordained as a priest, and he served as curate in at least eighteen different parishes, including at Newick in Sussex, at Tywyn in Merionethshire, at Llanberis and Llanllechid in Carnarvonshire, and at Llanfair Talhaiarn in Denbighshire.

== Life and career ==
From an early age he cultivated poetry, and he was soon noticed by Lewis Morris the antiquary. He diligently applied himself to the study of Welsh literature, and employed his leisure time in transcribing ancient Welsh manuscripts, for which purpose he visited most of the libraries in Wales. At one time he received small annuities from Sir Watkin Williams Wynn and Dr John Warren, when bishop of St David's, to enable him to pursue his research. His first publication was entitled Some Specimens of the Poetry of the Antient Welsh Bards, translated into English; with explanatory notes on the historical passages, and a short account of men and places mentioned by the Bards; in order to give the curious some idea of the tastes and sentiments of our Ancestors, and their manner of writing. London, 1764, reprinted at Llanidloes [1862]. This work gained for its author a high reputation as an antiquary and a critic, and furnished Gray with matter for some of his most beautiful poetry. In it is included a Latin treatise by Evans, De Bardis Dissertatio; in qua nonnulla quæ ad eorum antiquitatem et munus respiciunt, et ad præcipuos qui in Cambria floruerunt, breviter discutiuntur.

Evans next published an English poem, The Love of our Country, a poem, with historical notes, address'd to Sir Watkin Williams Wynn. … By a Curate from Snowdon, Carmarthen, 1772. He also composed poems in Welsh, which are printed in the Dyddanwch Teuluaidd. In 1776 he published two volumes of Welsh sermons, translated from the works of John Tillotson and other English divines. In one notice of him it is stated that having passed a great part of his life in the cultivation of Welsh literature, "without being able to procure the smallest promotion in the church, his fortitude deserted him, and, to chase away his vexations, he fell into a habit of drinking, that at times produced symptoms of derangement." The fact is that Welsh prelates of the time were mostly Englishmen who knew no Welsh. Paul Panton, of Plâsgwyn in Anglesey, gave Evans at the end of his life an annuity, on condition that all Evans's manuscripts should at his death come to him. In consequence the whole collection of 100 volumes went to the Plâsgwyn library.

Evans was tall and athletic, and of a dark complexion. From his height he obtained the bardic appellation of Prydydd Hir (The Tall Poet), although his alternative bardic name Ieuan Fardd (Ieuan the Poet) name is usually used now to avoid confusion with the earlier poet Ieuan Brydydd Hir, (fl. c. 1450). He died at Cynhawdref, the place of his birth, on 4 August 1788, and was buried in Lledrod churchyard. The suddenness of his death gave rise to entirely false reports that he had committed suicide, or died of starvation on a mountain.

The Rev. Daniel Silvan Evans, B.D., published a collection of Evan Evans's miscellaneous writing under the title of Gwaith y Parchedig Evan Evans (Ieuan Brydydd Hir) golygedig gan D. Silvan Evans, B.D., Caernarfon: argraffedig gan H. Humphreys, 1876. This volume contains numerous poems in Welsh, the English poem on The Love of our Country forty-six of Evans's letters, mostly in English, A Short View of the State of Britain, reprinted from the 'Cambrian Quarterly Magazine,’ vol. i., and an English translation of Evans's Latin introduction to his intended publication of the Welsh Proverbs.
