= The Maypole =

Poem by Gruffudd ab Adda

"The Maypole" or "To a Birch Tree", known in Welsh as "I'r fedwen", "Y fedwen yn bawl haf", or "Y fedwen las anfadwallt", is a cywydd (a Welsh-language verse form) by the mid-14th century bard Gruffudd ab Adda; it is one of only three poems of his that have survived. It was formerly attributed to the pre-eminent Welsh-language poet, Dafydd ap Gwilym. The poem presents the unhappy fate of a woodland birch tree which has been chopped down and re-erected in the town of Llanidloes as a maypole, then with pathetic irony asks the tree to choose between its former existence and its present one. Dancing round a maypole was a popular recreation in medieval Welsh towns, and this poem is the first record of it. "The Maypole" has been praised by literary historians as one of the very finest of Welsh cywyddau, and was included in The Oxford Book of Welsh Verse.

== Summary ==
Once-majestic birch tree, you have been exiled! Last year I knew you well, when I and my girl frequented your wood, but now you have been brought to busy Llanidloes. It is no place for you! If you had not been brought to stand by the pillory it would have been better for the wood and for your woodland birds. The grass will not grow under you as you stand like a market-woman surrounded by the trafficking of merchandise. There will be no more bracken or primroses. It is the worse for us since you have lost your noble place. Choose: do you want to go home to the mountain or wither in the town?

== Manuscripts and authorship ==
"The Maypole" survives in 16 manuscripts, four of which, including the oldest one, attribute the poem to Dafydd ap Gwilym, and the remainder to Gruffudd ab Adda. Some of the earliest manuscripts are British Library MS Stowe 959 (BM 48), which was made c. 1600 in Carmarthenshire; Brogyntyn MS I.2, copied by Humphrey Davies, vicar of Darowen, Montgomeryshire, in 1599; Llansteffan MS 6, copied c. 1525, making it the oldest manuscript; LlGC MS 3046D (M 143), dating from the second half of the 16th century; and Peniarth MS 97, made c. 1605. In 1789 the first collected edition of Dafydd ap Gwilym's poems, Barddoniaeth Dafydd ab Gwilym, included "The Maypole", and an abridged English version of it appeared in Arthur James Johnes' Translations into English Verse from the Poems of Davyth ap Gwilym (1834). In the 20th and 21st centuries Gruffudd ab Adda's authorship of it has been established, and editions of Dafydd's poems now treat it as apocryphal.

== Reception ==
"The Maypole" is today a well-known poem, much lauded by critics. It has been called a work of "timeless excellence" which is "full of craftsmanship". For Rachel Bromwich it was one of only a handful of cywyddau to match the standard of Dafydd ap Gwilym's greatest poems; for W. J. Gruffydd, one of only two. (Note: The other was Siôn Phylip's "Cywydd to the Sea-Gull".)

== Analysis ==
Like Iolo Goch's poem "The Ploughman", "The Maypole" rejects urban life in favour of traditional Welsh rural ways, perhaps motivated in part by a dislike of towns for their role in defending the economic interests of English merchants settled in Wales. The poem's presentation of the woodland as an ideal place for assignations with one's lover is a regular trope of medieval literature, but Gruffudd's relationship with Nature as revealed here goes far beyond literary convention. He sympathises with the natural world in a way which is only matched by Dafydd ap Gwilym among Gruffudd's contemporaries, and indeed even Dafydd does not have the love for flowers that "The Maypole" reveals. Gruffudd's attitude to Nature was, indeed, a remarkably modern one, with this poem reminding one commentator of John Clare's poem "The Fallen Elm" and Hans Christian Andersen's fairy tale "The Fir-Tree". The poem's imagery is more traditional, one example being the metaphor of hair used for a tree's foliage, which finds parallels not just in Dafydd's work but even as far back as the Classical or Late Antique Pervigilium Veneris. The idea of personifying the tree is also in keeping with the conventions of Welsh poetry in Gruffudd's time, as shown in, for example, Gruffudd Gryg's poem to the Moon and, again, Iolo Goch's "The Ploughman". The tree here is, as one critic says, "a poignant symbol of beauty's transience and exile's pain".

== Editions ==
- Williams, Ifor; Roberts, Thomas, eds. (1935) [1914]. Cywyddau Dafydd ap Gwilym a'i Gyfoeswyr. Caerdydd: Gwasg Prifysgol Cymru. pp. 113–115.
- Bell, H. Idris (1940). "Translations from the Cywyddwyr". Transactions of the Honourable Society of Cymmrodorion: 226, 228.
- Parry, Thomas, ed. (1983) [1962]. The Oxford Book of Welsh Verse. Oxford: Oxford University Press. pp. 90–92. ISBN 9780198121299.

== Translations and paraphrases ==
- Bell, H. Idris (1940). "Translations from the Cywyddwyr". Transactions of the Honourable Society of Cymmrodorion: 227, 229.
- Bromwich, Rachel (1979). "The Earlier Cywyddwyr: Poets Contemporary with Dafydd ap Gwilym". In Jarman, A. O. H.; Hughes, Gwilym Rees (eds.). A Guide to Welsh Literature. Volume 2. Swansea: Christopher Davies. p. 150. ISBN 0715404571. Abridged translation
- Clancy, Joseph P. (1965). Medieval Welsh Lyrics. London: Macmillan. pp. 107–108.
  - Revised translation in Clancy, Joseph P. (2003). Medieval Welsh Poems. Dublin: Four Courts Press. pp. 208–209. ISBN 9781851826964.
- Jackson, Kenneth Hurlstone, ed. (1971) [1951]. A Celtic Miscellany. Harmondsworth: Penguin. pp. 82–84. ISBN 9780140442472.
- Johnes, Arthur James (1834). Translations into English Verse from the Poems of Davyth ap Gwilym. London: Henry Hooper. pp. 71–72.
- Watson, Giles (2016). Rivals of Dafydd ap Gwilym: A Treasury of Fourteenth and Fifteenth Century Welsh Verse. npp: pp. pp. 18–20. ISBN 9781326900458.
