= Samuel Jones =

Samuel Jones may refer to:

== Politics ==
- Samuel Jones (English politician) (1610–1673), member of parliament, 1656 and 1660
- Samuel Jones-Loyd, 1st Baron Overstone (1796–1883), British banker and politician
- Samuel Jones (New York comptroller) (1734–1819)
- Samuel Jones (chancellor) (1769–1853), chancellor of New York, 1826–1828
- Samuel Jones (Massachusetts politician) (1778–1862)
- Samuel J. Jones (c. 1820–c. 1880), sheriff, Kansas Territory, US
- Samuel S. Jones (Utah politician) (1837–1923)
- Samuel S. Jones (Wisconsin politician) (1854–1912)
- Samuel M. Jones (1846–1904), "Golden Rule Jones," American businessman and politician
- Samuel A. Jones (1861–1937), New York politician
- Samuel Thomas Jones, member of the Texas House of Representatives

== Religion ==
- Samuel Jones (nonconformist) (1628–1697), Welsh clergyman
- Samuel Jones (academy tutor) (1681/2–1719), English dissenter
- Samuel Porter Jones (1847–1906), American evangelist

== Sports ==
- Samuel Jones (footballer, born 1866) (1866–?), Welsh international
- Samuel Jones (footballer, born 1870) (1870–?), Welsh international
- Samuel Jones (footballer, born 1955), English professional
- Samuel Jones (athlete) (1880–1954), American high jumper
- Samuel Jones (bowls) (1867–1944), English bowls player

== Other ==
- Samuel Jones (composer) (born 1935), American composer
- Samuel Jones (general) (1819–1887), Confederate Army officer
- Samuel Maurice Jones (1853–1932), Welsh painter
- Samuel Levi Jones, American artist

== See also ==
- Sam Jones (disambiguation), includes Sammy
- Samantha Jones (disambiguation)
