= Evan Evans (Ieuan Glan Geirionydd) =

Welsh clergyman and writer (1795–1855)

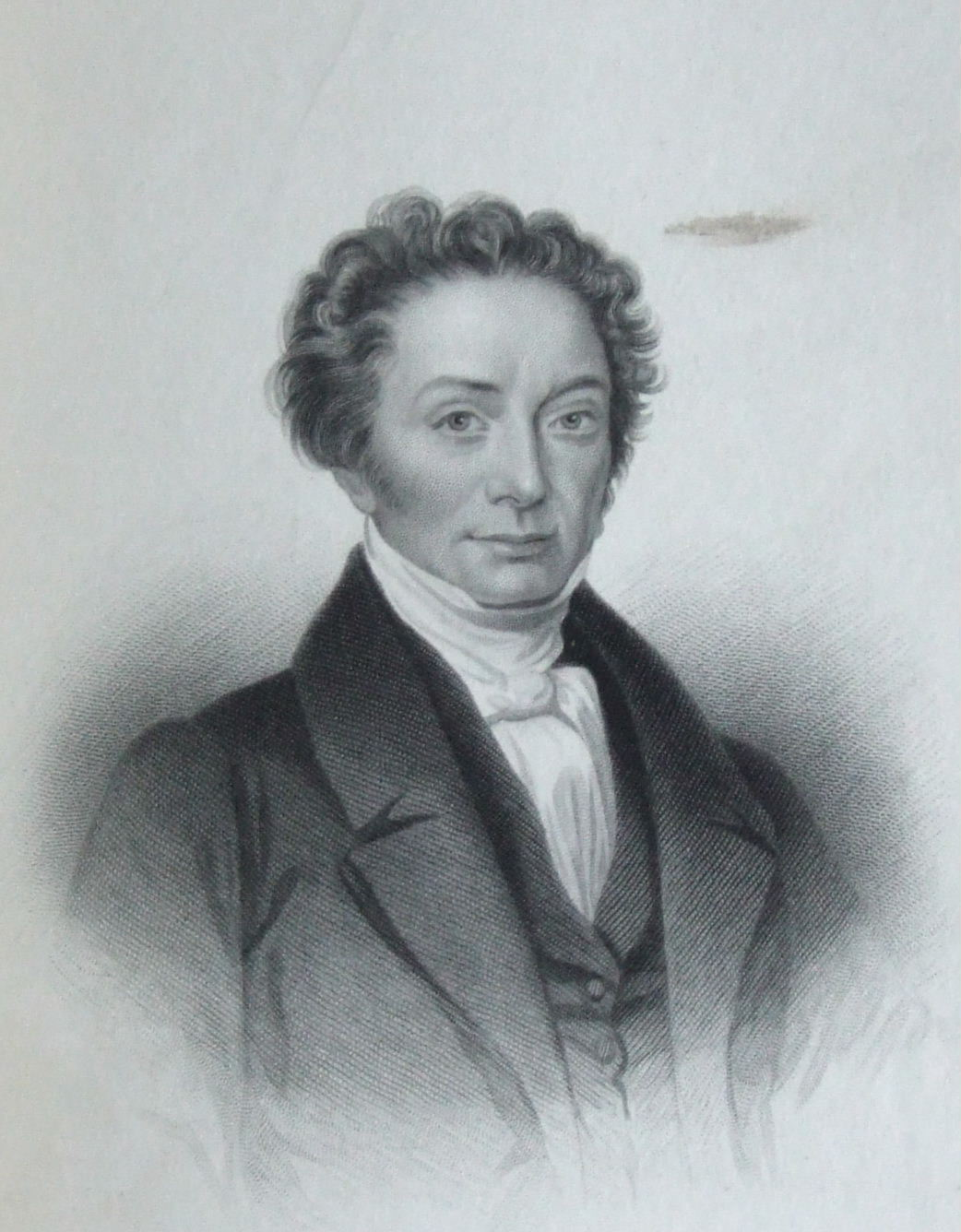
Engraving of a portrait of Evan Evans

Evan Evans (20 April 1795 – 21 January 1855), was a Welsh clergyman, poet, hymnwriter, journalist, translator and devotional writer, who was three times chaired at various local Eisteddfodau. His works were almost all written in the Welsh language, the poems being published under his bardic name, Ieuan Glan Geirionydd. Seven of his poems are included in The Oxford Book of Welsh Verse. His best-known poems are perhaps Ysgoldy Rhad Llanrwst, Glan Geirionydd and Cyflafan Morfa Rhuddlan, and his hymns include Rwy'n sefyll ar dymhestlog lan and Mae 'nghyfeillion adre'n myned.

== Youth ==
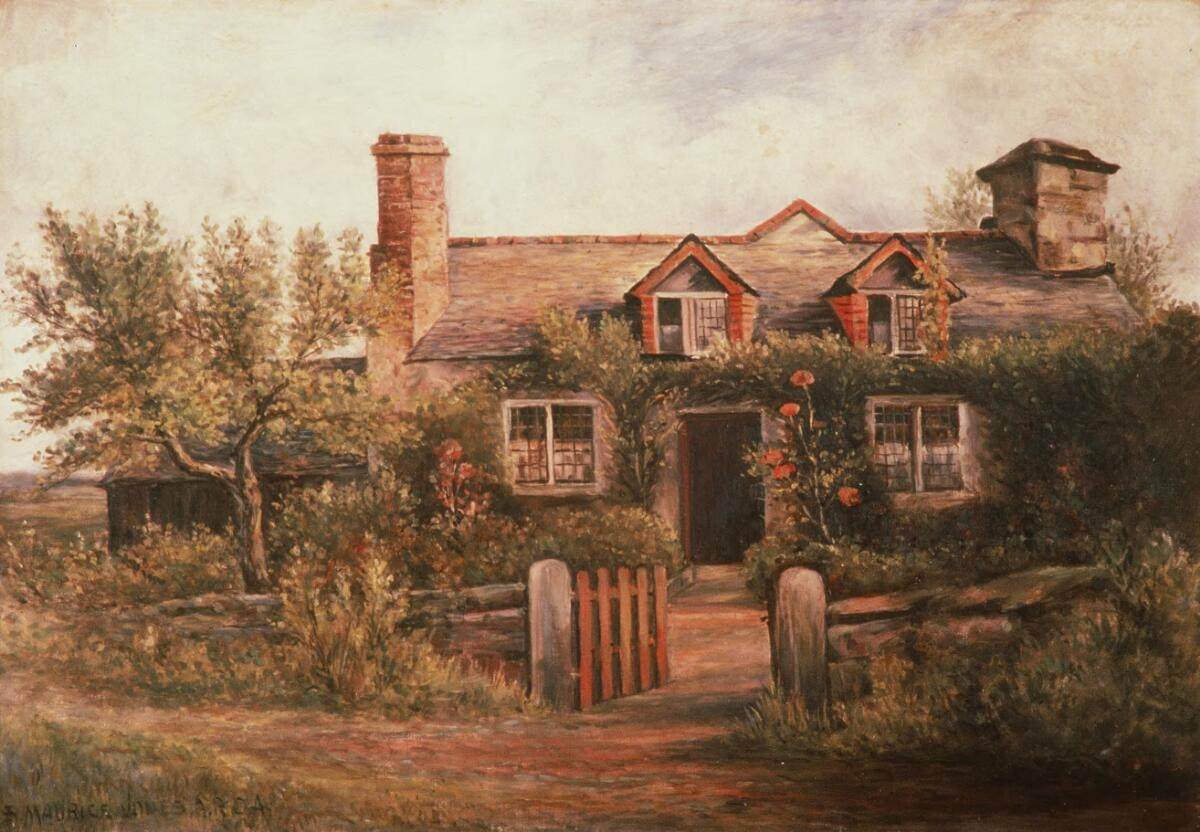
Samuel Maurice Jones, Tan y Celyn, Trefriw (c. 1908). The farmhouse in which Evans was born.

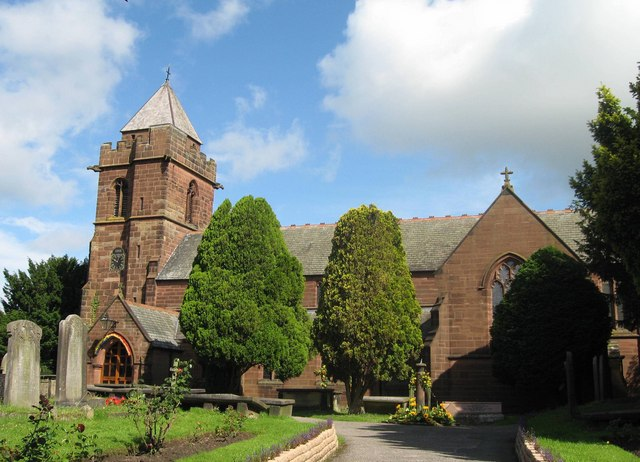
St James', Christleton, which was Evans' church for 17 years.

Evan Evans was born at Tan-y-Celyn, a farmhouse near the village of Trefriw, (then Caernarfonshire). His parents were educated people, and indeed his father was a poet; they were among the first Calvinist Methodists in their village. Young Evan received his education at the village church school, then at the free grammar school in Llanrwst. He then began working on his parents' farm, but the family fell into poverty when their landlord raised the rent. In 1816 Evan, though he had never had any higher education, was taken on as schoolmaster at a day-school in Tal-y-Bont. Moving to Chester he became an elder of the Methodist Church, though not yet 26 years of age. Around this time he published several books on theological subjects, some original and some translations into Welsh, but they have today no great reputation.

== Clerical career ==
Evans' first successes as a poet now brought him to the notice of various gentlemen and clergymen, who suggested he seek ordination in the Church of England. He trained for the priesthood at Berriew in Montgomeryshire and at St Bees Theological College in Cumberland, and was ordained in 1826. The same year he was licensed to conduct Welsh-language services at St Martin's, Chester, and made curate of Christleton, near Chester. In 1843 he was transferred to the curacy of Ince, in Cheshire. In 1852 his wife, of whom little is known, died, and since Evans himself was in poor health he returned home to Trefriw. In July 1854 he was given a curacy in Rhyl, and the following January he died there. He was buried in Trefriw, alongside his parents and his wife.

== Journalism ==
For some years in his youth Evans devoted much of his time to Welsh-language journalism. From 1818 to 1820, when he stepped down for health reasons, he was editor of the monthly magazine Goleuad Gwynedd. In 1833 he became editor of Y Gwladgarwr, a magazine set up in imitation of the English Saturday Magazine, and continued in that job for three years. Long after Evans' death it was remembered as being "far and away the most interesting of the earlier Welsh periodicals", and "one of the best magazines ever published in Welsh."

== Poetry ==
Evans is today chiefly known neither as a journalist nor as a clergyman but as a poet. He won the Chair at various Eisteddfodau on three occasions: in 1818 with an awdl on the death of Princess Charlotte, in 1828 with his Awdl ar Wledd Belsassar ("Belshazzar's Feast"), and lastly in 1850 with a pryddest called Yr Adgyfodiad ("The Resurrection"). His poems have in common a Stoical viewpoint and a smooth, musical, dignified style marked by clarity of language. Nevertheless, his oeuvre as a whole shows a versatility unmatched by any other 19th-century Welsh poet. He employed both the strict, classical Welsh metres and the free metres, and also excelled as a hymnwriter.

His poems in the strict metres vary widely in quality. Some, such as his Belshazzar's Feast, are disfigured by an archaism of vocabulary and spelling which betray the influence of William Owen Pughe and are now seldom read. Others, like his cywydd Y Bedd ("The Grave") (1821), notable for its metrical ease, are counted among the finest strict-metre poems of their time.

Most of the poems for which he is now remembered are lyrics written in the free metres. Their themes include Welsh history, as in Cyflafan Morfa Rhuddlan ("The Massacre of Rhuddlan Marsh"), memories of his own childhood, as in Glan Geirionydd ("The Bank of Geirionydd") and Ysgoldy Rhad Llanrwst ("The Free School of Llanrwst"), and praise of mountain scenery, as in Glan Geirionydd again and Rhieingerdd Bugail Cwmdyli ("The Love Song of the Shepherd of Cwm Dyli"). Many of them are influenced by the works of the 18th-century English Graveyard School.

Evans' best hymns are considered to be among the greatest in the Welsh language; they are sung, it has been said, wherever the Welsh language is spoken. The words employ a polished style reminiscent of Isaac Watts; they are in some cases original and in others translations from the English. The melodies were in some cases Evans' work also, albeit harmonised by others.

== Works ==
=== Poems ===
- Dau o Gywyddau, y Cyntaf am Anorfod Awdurdod Angeu, ar yr Hil Ddynol. Yr Ail i'r Bedd. Trefriw: J. Jones. 1821. [With Robert Thomas of Llidiardau].
- Awdl ar Ymweliad Ei Fawrhydi Sior y Pedwerydd ag Ynys Fon, yn y Flwyddyn 1821. Trefriw: J. Jones. 1822.
- Eisteddfod Frenhinol Rhuddlan, 1850. Cyfrol 1: Y cyfansoddiadau buddugol ar y testun cadeiriol sef yr adgyfodiad. Llundain: Simpkin, Marshall. 1850. [With William Williams (Caledfryn)].

=== Hymns and songs ===
- A Selection of Hymns, for Christleton Church. Chester: F. P. Evans. 1835.
- Y Seraph, sef Casgliad o Donau Crefyddol, ar Amrywiol Fesurau. Caerlleon: J. Seacome. 1838.
- Hynt y meddwyn, o'i ddechreuad cyssurus i'w ddiwedd trallodus. Llundain: Simpkin, Marshall. 1851.

=== Prose ===
- Prynedigaeth Neillduol, neu, Grist yn Rhoi Ei Hun Dros yr Eglwys. [Chester]: I. Fletcher. 1819.
- Amddiffyniad yr Athrawiaeth Ysgrythyrol o Brynedigaeth Neillduol. Trefriw: J. Jones. 1820. [A translation of John Hurrion's The Scripture Doctrine of Particular Redemption].
- Calfiniaeth yn Cael ei Dad-Lenu, a'r Gwirionedd ei Amddiffyn. Caernarfon: J. Hulme. 1820.
- Pedwar Cyflwr Dyn. Caerleon: I. Fletcher. 1821. [Translation, ostensibly by John Parry but actually by Evan Evans, of Thomas Boston's Human Nature in Its Fourfold State].
- Rhai Ymddiddanion a Christopher Davis a Wm. Clarke. Bala: R. Saunderson. 1832. [Translation of Narrative of conversations held with Christopher Davis and William Clarke, attributed to Sir James Allan Park].
- A Letter Addressed to the Right Honourable Lord Robert Grosvenor, M.P. Explanatory of the Object and Design of the Chester Cambrian Society. Chester: T. Griffith. 1832.
- Y Bibl Darluniadol. Llundain: Simpkin, Marshall. 1844–1850. [In three volumes, edited by Evans].

=== Collected works ===
- Geirionydd. Rhuthyn: I. Clarke. 1862. [Edited by William John Roberts (Gwilym Cowlyd) and Richard Parry (Gwalchmai)].

=== Selections ===
- Ieuan Glan Geirionydd. Llanuwchllyn: Ab Owen. 1908. [Edited by Sir Owen Morgan Edwards]
- Detholion o Waith Ieuan Glan Geirionydd. Caerdydd: Gwasg Prifysgol Cymru. 1931. [Edited by Saunders Lewis].

== Translations ==
English translations, complete and incomplete, of Evans' Welsh-language poems and hymns:

- Angau yn Ymyl:
  - Lewis, H. Elvet (1889). Sweet Singers of Wales: A Story of Welsh Hymns and Their Authors. London: The Religious Tract Society. pp. 106–107.
- Ar làn Iorddonen ddofn
  - Protheroe, Daniel (1918). "Deep Jordan's bank I tread". Cân a Nawl: Song and Praise. Chicago: Y Gymanfa Gyffredinol. p. 237.
- At un a wrendy weddi'r gwán
  - Protheroe, Daniel (1918). "O Thou, from Whom all goodness flows". Cân a Nawl: Song and Praise. Chicago: Y Gymanfa Gyffredinol. p. 143.
- Beati Mortui:
  - Williams, Gwyn (1976). "Epigram". To Look for a Word. Llandysul: Gomer Press. p. 208. ISBN 0850883563.
- Y Bedd:
  - Evans, John Young (March 1895). "Mankind's Procession to the Grave". Wales. 2 (11): 120.
- Caniad y Gog i Arfon:
  - Jenkins, John, ed. (1873). "Song to Arvon". The Poetry of Wales. London: Houlston. pp. 44–45.
- Croesi'r Iordonen:
  - Cariadfab (August 1896). "The Crossing of Jordan". Wales. 3 (28): 358.
- Cydmariaeth rhwng y byd a’r Môr:
  - Jenkins, John, ed. (1873). "The World and the Sea: A Comparison". The Poetry of Wales. London: Houlston. p. 135. [misattributed here to John Blackwell]
- Cyflafan Morfa Rhuddlan:
  - Alfred [pseudonym of William Rushton] (1862). "The Slaughter of Rhuddlan Marsh". Morfa Rhuddlan: or, The Battle of Rhuddlan Marsh, with an English Version of Ieuan Glan Geirionydd's Celebrated Ode, and Historical Illustrations. Ruthin: Isaac Clarke. pp. 15, 17.
  - Jones, R. Bellis (September 1894). "Rhuddlan Marsh". Wales. 1 (5): 222.
  - Jones, Edmund O. (1896). "The Strand of Rhuddlan". Welsh Lyrics of the Nineteenth Century. London: Simpkin, Marshall. pp. 11–14.
  - Graves, Alfred Perceval (1912). "The Marsh of Rhuddlan". Welsh Poetry Old and New in English Verse. London: Longmans, Green. pp. 55–56.
- Glan Geirionydd:
  - Jenkins, John, ed. (1873). "Glan Geirionydd". The Poetry of Wales. London: Houlston. pp. 125–126.
- Glan yr Iorddonen:
  - Lewis, H. Elvet (1889). Sweet Singers of Wales: A Story of Welsh Hymns and Their Authors. London: The Religious Tract Society. pp. 107–108.
- Hen Forgan a’i Wraig:
  - Jenkins, John, ed. (1873). "Old Morgan and His Wife". The Poetry of Wales. London: Houlston. pp. 105–107.
- Mae ’nghyfeillion adre’n myned:
  - Bryan, R. (February 1895). "Parting". Wales. 2 (10): 80.
  - Protheroe, Daniel (1918). "This is not my place of resting". Cân a Nawl: Song and Praise. Chicago: Y Gymanfa Gyffredinol. p. 234.
- Na Wrthod Fi:
  - Lewis, H. Elvet (1889). Sweet Singers of Wales: A Story of Welsh Hymns and Their Authors. London: The Religious Tract Society. pp. 105–106.
- Yr Ochor Draw:
  - Jones, Edmund O. (1896). "Why Should We Weep". Welsh Lyrics of the Nineteenth Century. London: Simpkin, Marshall. pp. 17–18.
- O Dduw, rho im' dy hedd
  - Protheroe, Daniel (1918). "O God! Thy peace grant me". Cân a Nawl: Song and Praise. Chicago: Y Gymanfa Gyffredinol. p. 235.
- Rhieingerdd Bugail Cwmdyli:
  - Jones, Edmund O. (1896). "The Shepherd of Cwmdyli". Welsh Lyrics of the Nineteenth Century. London: Simpkin, Marshall. pp. 15–16.
  - Lewis, H. Elvet (1899). "The Shepherd of Cwm Dyli". Bedd Gelert: Its Facts, Fairies & Folk-Lore. By Jenkins, D. E. Portmadoc: Llewelyn Jenkins. pp. 297–298.
- Rwy’n sefyll ar dymhestlog lan yr hen Iorddonen ddu:
  - Owen, J. P. (October 1895). "One of Ieuan Glan Geirionydd's hymns". Wales. 2 (18): 448.
  - Bell, H. Idris (1913). "Hymn". Poems from the Welsh Translated into English Verse. Carnarvon: Welsh Publishing. p. 41.
- Ysgoldy Rhad Llanrwst:
  - Graves, Alfred Perceval (1912). "From "The Old School"". Welsh Poetry Old and New in English Verse. London: Longmans, Green. p. 54.
  - Conran, Anthony; Williams, J. E. Caerwyn, eds. (1967). "The Free School-House, Llanrwst". The Penguin Book of Welsh Verse. Harmondsworth: Penguin. pp. 219–220.
  - Williams, Gwyn (1979). "Llanrwst Free School". Choose Your Stranger. Port Talbot: Alun. pp. 59–60. ISBN 0950564370.
