= The Wind (poem) =

14th-century poem by Dafydd ap Gwilym

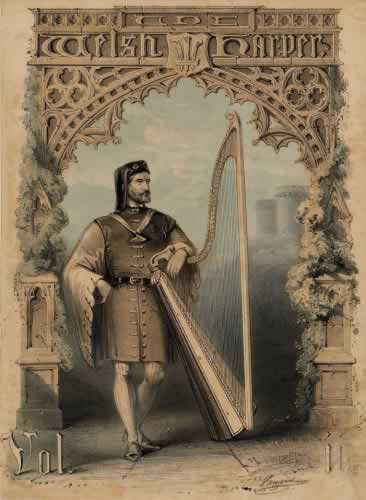
An anonymous 19th-century imaginary portrait of Dafydd ap Gwilym

"The Wind" (Welsh: Y Gwynt) is a 64-line love poem in the form of a cywydd by the 14th-century Welsh poet Dafydd ap Gwilym. Dafydd is widely seen as the greatest of the Welsh poets, and this is one of his most highly praised works. Rachel Bromwich called it "one of the greatest of all his poems", while the academic critic Andrew Breeze has hailed it as "a masterpiece" and "a work of genius", noting especially its "rhetorical splendour".

== Summary ==
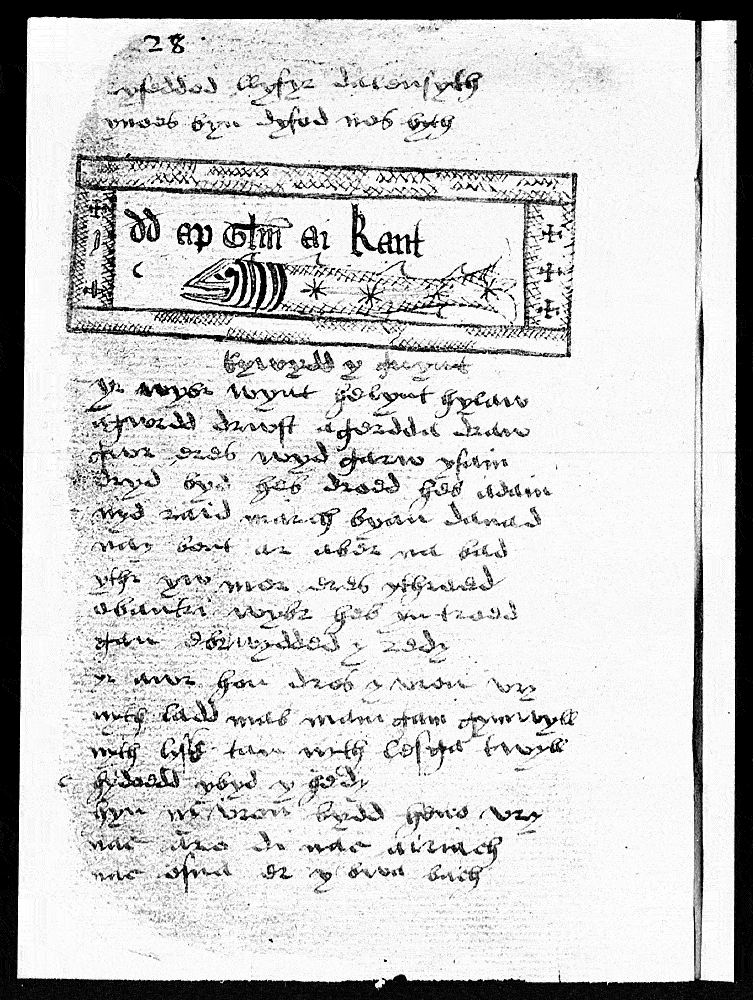
The first lines of the poem in a manuscript dating from c. 1520

The poet opens by addressing the wind, calling it a strange being, going where it wills, and subject to none of the physical or legal restraints of ordinary human life. After praising it for its power the poet goes on to compare it to an author, a sower of leaves, and a jester. Then he asks the wind to visit Uwch Aeron [the northern part of Ceredigion, from where Parth came], and, paying no heed to her husband Bwa Bach to visit the poet's lover Morfudd, on whose account he is an exile from his native land. The wind is to send the poet's sighs to Morfudd, to assure her of his continued love, and to return safely.

== Poetic art ==
"The Wind" shows great inventiveness in its choice of metaphors and similes, while employing extreme metrical complexity. It is one of the classic examples of the use of what has been called "a guessing game technique" or "riddling", a technique known in Welsh as dyfalu, comprising the stringing together of imaginative and hyperbolic similes and metaphors. Sometimes Dafydd used dyfalu pejoratively; less often, as in this poem, to express his wonder at one of the great forces of nature. The display of Dafydd's virtuosity in this technique has been seen as his prime motivation for writing the poem.

Lines 9–24 of the poem all begin with the letter N, and in the succeeding 14 lines a similar use is made of the letters R, S, D, and finally H. Dafydd took this poetic device, known as cymeriad, from the older poetic form of awdl, a kind of poem much used by court poets of the preceding centuries for poems of praise addressed to their patrons. He employed it in several of his cywyddau.

== Genre and themes ==
"The Wind" is cast in a form closely associated with Dafydd, the poem in which a messenger or llatai, usually a bird or animal, is sent to the poet's lover. It is a good example of how Dafydd's works in this form can include a close and warmly-appreciative description of a llatai, even when, as is often the case in Dafydd's poems, he is describing nature in one of its harsher aspects. The careering course of the wind is embodied in the headlong pace of the poem. Rachel Bromwich called "The Wind" one of "the outstanding expressions of Dafydd's wonder and awe at the mysteries of the cosmic forces", but pointed out that in the end Dafydd curbs this force to act as a love-messenger to Morfudd. The poet Gwyneth Lewis sees the poem as "a hymn to the havoc that art can work in the world", while for the scholar Helen Fulton the wind is a metaphor for "freedom and autonomy from the laws of governing society". This political aspect of the poem is particularly apparent in lines 19–22 (13–16 in some editions):

…though you winnow leaves
no one indicts you, you are not restrained
by any swift troop, nor officer's hand
nor blue blade…

This has been interpreted as an implicit comparison with the king's official messengers, who were immune from legal consequences should they trample their way through standing crops in the line of duty. Andrew Breeze finds in these same lines a reminder that Dafydd was living in a land occupied by foreigners. On the other hand, for Anthony Conran the freedom celebrated in the poem is an essentially personal one, the expression of his own ungovernable character. Likewise Richard Morgan Loomis sees the wind as Dafydd's "glorious alter-ego", the poem being "the paradoxical fantasy of a frustration that would speak through an uncontrollable freedom".

== Sources, analogues and influence ==
There are some verbal resemblances between this poem and "The Song of the Wind", a poem found in the Book of Taliesin: Taliesin, or whoever was that poem's author, describes the wind as a "powerful creature" without foot or head, flesh or bone, while Dafydd calls it a "strange being…without foot or wing". This strongly suggests to some scholars that Dafydd knew the older poem, though in recent years doubt has been cast on this line of argument. Andrew Breeze finds, in a passage describing the wind in Jean de Meun's continuation of the Roman de la Rose, no less than 16 motifs which also appear in Dafydd's poem, though re-arranged and re-imagined. He concludes that Dafydd is likely to have known and been influenced by the Roman de la Rose. An analogue to Dafydd's use of the wind as a llatai has been pointed out in the Middle English lyric "Blow, northerne wind, send thou me my sweting", one of the Harley Lyrics collected in a manuscript dated c. 1320. A passage from Iolo's cywydd "The Ploughman" in which the ploughman is defined by the faults he is not guilty of, with the implication that those in authority do, can be compared with the section of "The Wind" in which a series of similar negative statements covertly accuses English law officers of oppressive practices.

The 15th-century poet Maredudd ap Rhys wrote a cywydd on the wind which shows several similarities with the poem of his predecessor Dafydd; certainly more than can be accounted for by coincidence. For example, Dafydd writes

Such as you none can stay,
Nor fire burn nor guile betray,
Nor water drown; vain the quest
Your bodiless being to arrest.

And similarly Maredudd has

Wave cannot drown thee, nor fire molest,
Man's eye behold, men's force arrest.

== English translations and paraphrases ==
- Bell, Harold Idris, in Bell, H. Idris; Bell, David (1942). Fifty Poems. Y Cymmrodor, vol. 48. London: Honourable Society of Cymmrodorion. pp. 189, 191, 193. With the Middle Welsh original in parallel text.
- Bromwich, Rachel, ed. (1985) [1982]. Dafydd ap Gwilym: A Selection of Poems. Harmondsworth: Penguin. pp. 104–106. ISBN 0140076131. With the Middle Welsh original in parallel text.
- Clancy, Joseph P. (1965). Medieval Welsh Lyrics. London: Macmillan. pp. 71–73.
  - Rev. repr. in Clancy, Joseph P. (2016). The Poems of Dafydd ap Gwilym. Bath: Brown Dog. pp. 232–234. ISBN 9781785450891.
- Conran, Anthony; Williams, J. E. Caerwyn, eds. (1967). The Penguin Book of Welsh Verse. Harmondsworth: Penguin. pp. 147–148.
  - Repr. in Welsh Verse. Translated by Conran, Tony. Bridgend: Seren. 1992. pp. 178–180. ISBN 1854110810.
  - Repr. in Conran, Tony (1992). Welsh Verse. Bridgend: Seren. pp. 178–180. ISBN 1854110810.
- Green, Martin (1993). Homage to Dafydd ap Gwilym. Lewiston/Queenston/Lampeter: The Edwin Mellen Press. pp. 9–10. ISBN 0773493182.
- [Gruffydd, W. J.] (1935). Dafydd ap Gwilym. Caerdydd: Gwasg Prifysgol Cymru. pp. 77, 79. Abridged.
- Heseltine, Nigel, ed. (1968) [1944]. Twenty-Five Poems by Dafydd ap Gwilym. Banbury: Piers Press. pp. 17–19.
- Humphries, Rolfe (1969). Nine Thorny Thickets. Kent, Ohio: Kent State University Press. pp. 39–40.
- Huws, Daniel (Spring 1967). "Four from Dafydd ap Gwilym". Arion. 6 (1): 93–94.
  - Repr. in Washburn, Katharine; Major, John S.; Fadimon, Clifton, eds. (1998). World Poetry: An Anthology of Verse from Antiquity to Our Time. New York: W. W. Norton. pp. 446–447. ISBN 0393041301.
- [Johnes, Arthur James] (1834). Translations into English Verse from the Poems of Davyth ap Gwilym. London: Henry Hooper. pp. 50–51. Abridged.
- Johnston, Dafydd. At "47 – Y Gwynt". Gwaith Dafydd ap Gwilym. Welsh Department, Swansea University.
- Lewes, Evelyn (1914). Life and Poems of Dafydd ap Gwilym. London: David Nutt. pp. 53–55.
- Lewis, Gwyneth (November 2014). "The Wind". Poetry. 205 (2): 104–105.
- Loomis, Richard Morgan, ed. (1982). Dafydd ap Gwilym: The Poems. Binghamton: Center for Medieval & Early Renaissance Studies. pp. 220–222. ISBN 0866980156.
  - Rev. repr. in Loomis, Richard; Johnston, Dafydd (1992). Medieval Welsh Poems. Binghamton: Medieval & Renaissance Texts & Studies. pp. 45–46. ISBN 0866981020.
- Owen, William. "[Letter to the editor]". The Monthly Magazine. 8 (1): 542–543. 1 August 1799.
  - Repr. in Jones, Edward (1802). The Bardic Museum, of Primitive British Literature. London: A. Strahan. pp. 54–55.
- Thomas, Gwyn, ed. (2001). Dafydd ap Gwilym: His Poems. Cardiff: University of Wales Press. pp. 227–228. ISBN 0708316646.
- Walters, Bryan (1977). From the Welsh. Aberystwyth: Celtion. pp. 33–34. ISBN 0860530086.
- Watson, Giles (2014). Dafydd ap Gwilym: Paraphrases and Palimpsests. npp: pp. pp. 134–135. ISBN 9781291866803.
