= Edward Richard =

Welsh poet

Edward Richard (March 1714 – 4 March 1777) was a Welsh poet.

== Life ==
Born at Ystrad Meurig, Cardiganshire, he was son of Thomas Richard, a tailor and innkeeper. He was educated first at a school there, and then for a short time at Carmarthen grammar school. About 1734 he opened a school of his own at Ystrad Meurig, which after several years he closed, thinking himself in need of further study. After two years he began teaching again, as first master of a newly endowed school in the adjoining parish of Lledrod; but soon he founded and endowed out of his own savings a free grammar school in Ystrad Meurig. He also founded a library for the use of the school in 1759.

Richard had a reputation for classical learning, and his school became well known in Wales. Richard himself declined ordination. He died unmarried on 28 February 1777, and was buried in the church at Ystrad Meurig. A memorial stone with a Latin inscription was placed on the wall of the school library.

== Works ==
Richard was author of pastoral poetry in the Welsh language, poems are on the plan of those of Theocritus and Virgil. His first pastoral, which was occasioned by the death of his mother, about 1764, was published in 1765 or 1766. It was followed by another in 1776. It is believed that many of his earlier compositions have been lost. The two pastorals, together with two other songs and some hymns, were published, with a biography, in 1811 under the title of Yr Eos: sef Gwaith Prydyddawl Mr. Edward Richard Ystrad Meurig, gyda hanes ei fywyd, London, and reprinted at Carmarthen in 1813, 1851, and 1856. An englyn which does not appear in the collection is given in John Jones's History of Wales (p. 257), where it is said to have been addressed by Richard to his friend Evan Evans (Ieuan Brydydd Hir), who also wrote a short poem in eulogy of one of Richard's songs.

Richard was also an antiquarian, and his correspondence with Lewis Morris and others was published in the Cambrian Register. An elegy on him was written by David Richards (Dafydd Ionawr), who had been his pupil.

== Notes ==
Attribution

This article incorporates text from a publication now in the public domain: Lee, Sidney, ed. (1896). "Richard, Edward". Dictionary of National Biography. Vol. 48. London: Smith, Elder & Co.
