= Rhyd-lwyd =

Village in Ceredigion, Wales

Coordinates: 52.318332°N 3.988185°W

- Location within Ceredigion
- OS grid reference: SN 6458 7077
  - Cardiff: 67.4 mi (108.5 km)
  - London: 173.8 mi (279.7 km)
- Community: Lledrod
- Principal area: Ceredigion
- Country: Wales
- Sovereign state: United Kingdom
- Post town: Aberystwyth
- Postcode district: SY23
- Police: Dyfed-Powys
- Fire: Mid and West Wales
- Ambulance: Welsh
- UK Parliament: Ceredigion Preseli
- Senedd Cymru – Welsh Parliament: Ceredigion Penfro

Rhyd-lwyd is a small village in the community of Lledrod, Ceredigion, Wales, which is 67.4 miles (108.5 km) from Cardiff and 173.8 miles (279.6 km) from London. Rhyd-lwyd is represented in the Senedd by Elin Jones (Plaid Cymru) and is part of the Ceredigion Preseli constituency in the House of Commons.

== See also ==
- List of localities in Wales by population
