= Cambrian Quarterly Magazine and Celtic Repertory =

Welsh literary periodical (1829–1833)

The Cambrian Quarterly Magazine and Celtic Repertory
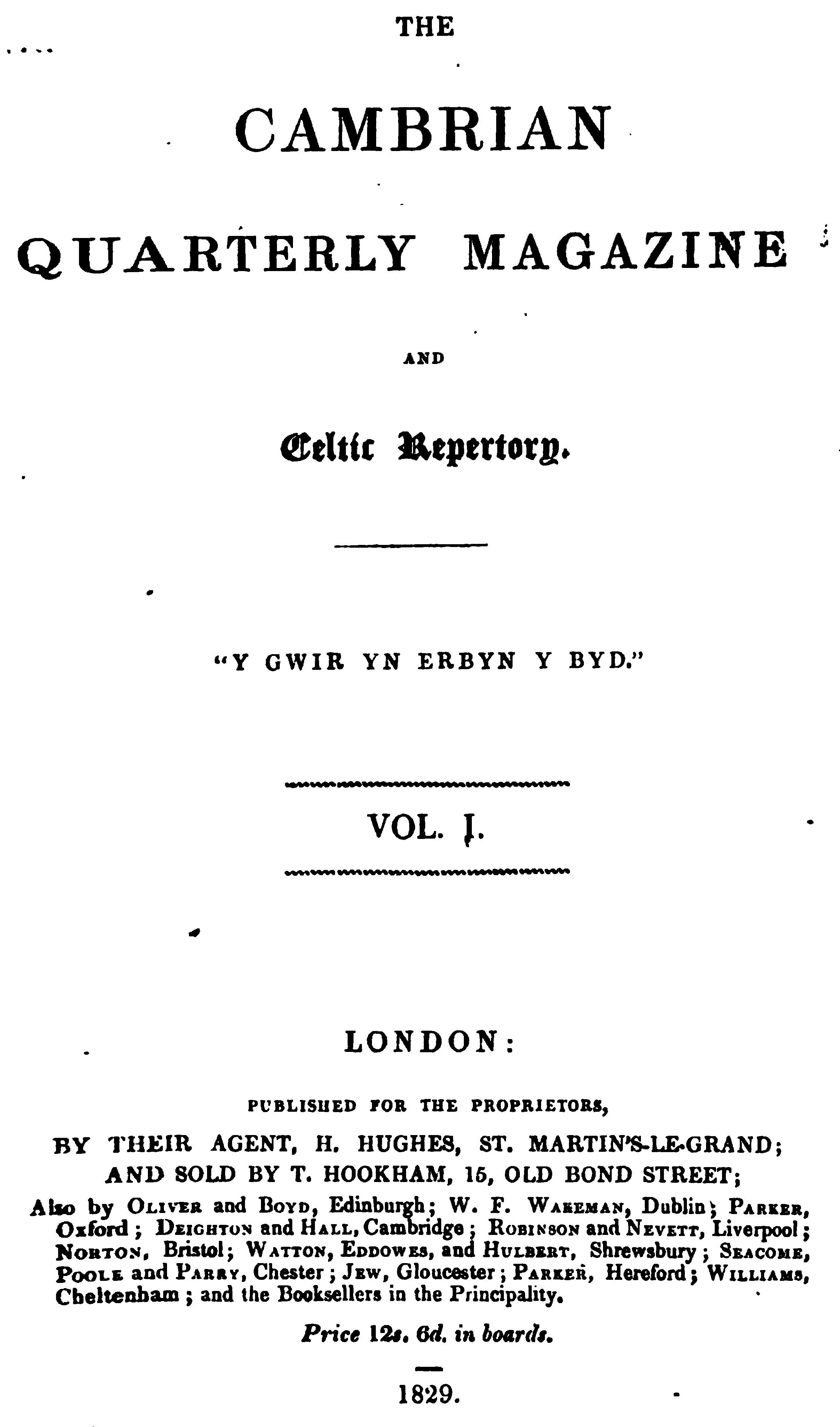
- Motto: Y Gwir Yn Erbyn Y Byd. "The Truth Against The World."
- Editor: Rice Pryce Buckley Williames
- Categories: Welsh and Celtic history and literature
- Frequency: Quarterly
- Publisher: H. Hughes (London)
- Founder: Rice Pryce Buckley Williames, Anthony Ashley Cooper, Thomas Price
- First issue: January 1829
- Final issue: October 1833
- Country: United Kingdom
- Language: English
- Website: The National Library of Wales: Welsh Journals

The Cambrian Quarterly Magazine and Celtic Repertory was an English-language quarterly magazine that published articles on Welsh and Celtic history and literature. Its aims were "to preserve 'native lore' for posterity and to win 'the incurious and indifferent into an interest for Wales'." It ran from 1829 to 1833.

== History ==
The principal founder of the magazine was Rice Pryce Buckley Williames who also served as its first editor. His co-proprietor was Anthony Ashley Cooper, later Lord Shaftsbury. Thomas Price, a cleric and historian who was instrumental in reviving the Eisteddfod, was also a founder. The magazine was promoted by county court judge Arthur James Johnes.

Noting the failure of previous efforts "to preserve and bring into notice the valuable relics of Welsh genius" because they sought to "interest the minds of Welshmen alone", the magazine's founders hoped to broaden its appeal by "making it interesting and pleasing to the general reader" (i.e. both Welsh and English).

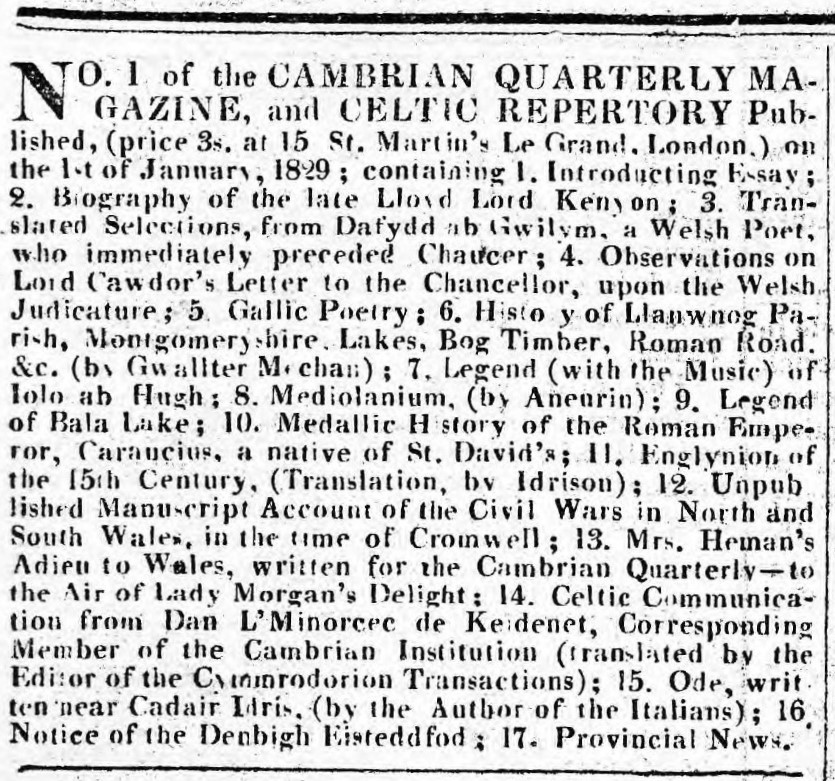
Contents of The Cambrian Quarterly, Vol. I, No. 1, January 1829. (Carmarthen Journal and South Wales Weekly Advertiser. 26 December 1828. p. 3.

The magazine was published in London by H. Hughes from January 1829 and contained "fiction, much material on ancient Welsh legends, essays, poetry, and articles on Irish life and culture, and critical notices." Articles covered the history and topography of Wales and included translations of early and medieval Welsh literature, and biographical pieces. As well as Williames and Price, contributors included John Jenkins, William Owen Pughe, Sir Samuel Rush Meyrick, Gwallter Mechain, and Thomas Richards under the pseudonym 'Mervinius'.

Although it received positive reviews and support in the Welsh and London newspapers, the magazine closed in October 1833 after a run of five volumes of four issues each. The magazine was also known for a short time in 1832 as The Cambrian and Caledonian Quarterly Magazine and Celtic Repertory.

== Issues ==
- 1829: Vol. I. Nos.1–4: January/April/July/October
- 1830: Vol. II. Nos.5–8: January/April/July/October
- 1831: Vol. III. Nos.9–12: January/April/July/October
- 1832: Vol. IV. Nos.13–16: January/April/July/October
- 1833: Vol. V. Nos.17–20: January/April/July/October
