= Samantha Jones =

Samantha Jones may refer to:

- Samantha Jones (singer) (born 1943), British singer
- Samantha Jones (Sex and the City), a character
- Samantha Jones (civil servant) (born 1971), chief operating officer of the Office of the Prime Minister (UK)
- Samantha "Sam" Jones, a character on Doctor Who
- Samantha Jones, one of the pseudonyms of Mary Millington

== See also ==
- Sam Jones (disambiguation)
- Samuel Jones (disambiguation)
- Jones (surname)
