= Paul Panton =

Welsh antiquarian

Paul Panton (4 May 1731 – 24 May 1797) was a Welsh barrister and antiquarian. He was known also as a reforming farmer and collector, as well as for his knowledge of Welsh history.

== Life ==
He was born at Bagillt in Flintshire, Wales, the son of Paul Panton or Patton (died 1762), and his wife Margaret Griffith. He was educated at Westminster School, admitted at Lincoln's Inn in 1744, and matriculated at Trinity Hall, Cambridge in 1746. In 1749 he was called to the bar, and went into practice.

Panton was closely involved in the local affairs of both Flintshire and Anglesey. Not a fluent Welsh speaker, he took an interest in Welsh antiquities and associated with the antiquarians Daines Barrington and Thomas Pennant. He died on 24 May 1797.

== Collection and legacy ==
Panton formed a collection of Welsh manuscripts, in nearly 100 volumes. It included manuscripts left to him by Evan Evans, the poet and antiquarian, on whom Panton had settled an annuity. Those consisted of more than 80 volumes, some of which were old, but mostly transcripts from the Hengwrt Library and Wynnstay archive. Panton's collection at Plâs Gwyn was open to antiquarians.

When Panton died in 1797, the manuscripts were left to his son Paul Panton the younger, who allowed the editors of The Myvyrian Archaiology of Wales access to them. In 1875 many of the manuscripts were said to be in the possession of Paul Panton, R.N., of Garreglwyd, Holyhead, a descendant. Most of the original collection is now in the National Library of Wales.

== Family ==
Panton married in 1756 Jane Jones (1725–1764), daughter of William Jones (1688–1755) of Plas Gwyn, Pentraeth. They had two sons and two daughters, and the marriage brought him an estate and house in Anglesey. After Jane's death, he married the widow Martha Kirk; they had two sons.
