= Gruffudd ab Adda =

Gruffudd ab Adda (fl. mid 14th century) was a Welsh language poet and musician. Gruffudd was a contemporary of Dafydd ap Gwilym, whose death he mourned in elegy. He was the author of "The Maypole".

== See also ==
- Gruffudd ab Adda at Wikisource
