= Sam Jones =

Sam Jones or Sammy Jones may refer to:

== Entertainment ==
- Sam J. Jones (born 1954), American actor, played Flash Gordon
- Sam Jones III (born 1983), American actor who played Pete Ross on Smallville
- Sam Jones (musician) (1924–1981), American jazz bassist, cellist, and composer
- Sam Jones (photographer), Los Angeles-based photographer, director, and television show host
- Sam Jones (actor)

== Fictional ==
- Sam Jones (Dynasty), character in the 2017 Dynasty television series reboot
- Sam Jones, an animated Fireman Sam character
- Sam Jones (Mayberry R.F.D.), character on The Andy Griffith Show and Mayberry R.F.D.
- Sam Jones (On the Up), British sitcom character
- Samantha Jones (Sex and the City), character on Sex and the City and The Carrie Diaries
- Samantha "Sam" Jones, character in Doctor Who

== Politics ==
- Sam H. Jones (1897–1978), governor of Louisiana
- Sam Jones (Alabama politician) (born 1947), Alabama state representative since 2018; mayor of Mobile, Alabama 2005–2013
- Sam Jones (Australian politician) (1923–1999), Member for Waratah, New South Wales, 1965–1984
- Sam Jones (Louisiana politician) (born 1953), Louisiana state representative for St. Mary Parish since 2008

== Sports ==
=== Association football ===
- Sam Jones (footballer, born 1991), English footballer
- Sam Jones (Welsh footballer), Welsh footballer
- Sammy Jones (footballer) (1911–1993), Irish footballer

=== Other sports ===
- Sam Jones (American football) (born 1996), American football offensive lineman
- Sam Jones (Australian footballer) (born 1974), Australian rules footballer
- Sad Sam Jones (1892–1966), American baseball player
- Sam Jones (baseball) (1925–1971), American baseball player known as "Toothpick Sam"
- Sam Jones (basketball, born 1933) (1933–2021), American basketball player in the NBA, inducted into Basketball Hall of Fame
- Sam Jones (basketball, born 1978), American basketball player and coach
- Sammy Jones (1861–1951), Australian cricketer
- Sam Jones (drag racer), American drag racer
- Sam Jones (rugby union) (born 1991), English rugby union footballer
- Sam Jones (ice hockey) (born 1997), English ice hockey player

== Others ==
- Ar-pi-uck-i (1760–1860), known as Sam Jones, Seminole Native American chief
- Sam Jones (Confederate Army officer) (1819–1887), Civil War Confederate Major General

== See also ==
- Samuel Jones (disambiguation)
- Samantha Jones (disambiguation)
