= Swyddffynnon =

Village in Ceredigion, Wales

Coordinates: 52.279024°N 3.917965°W

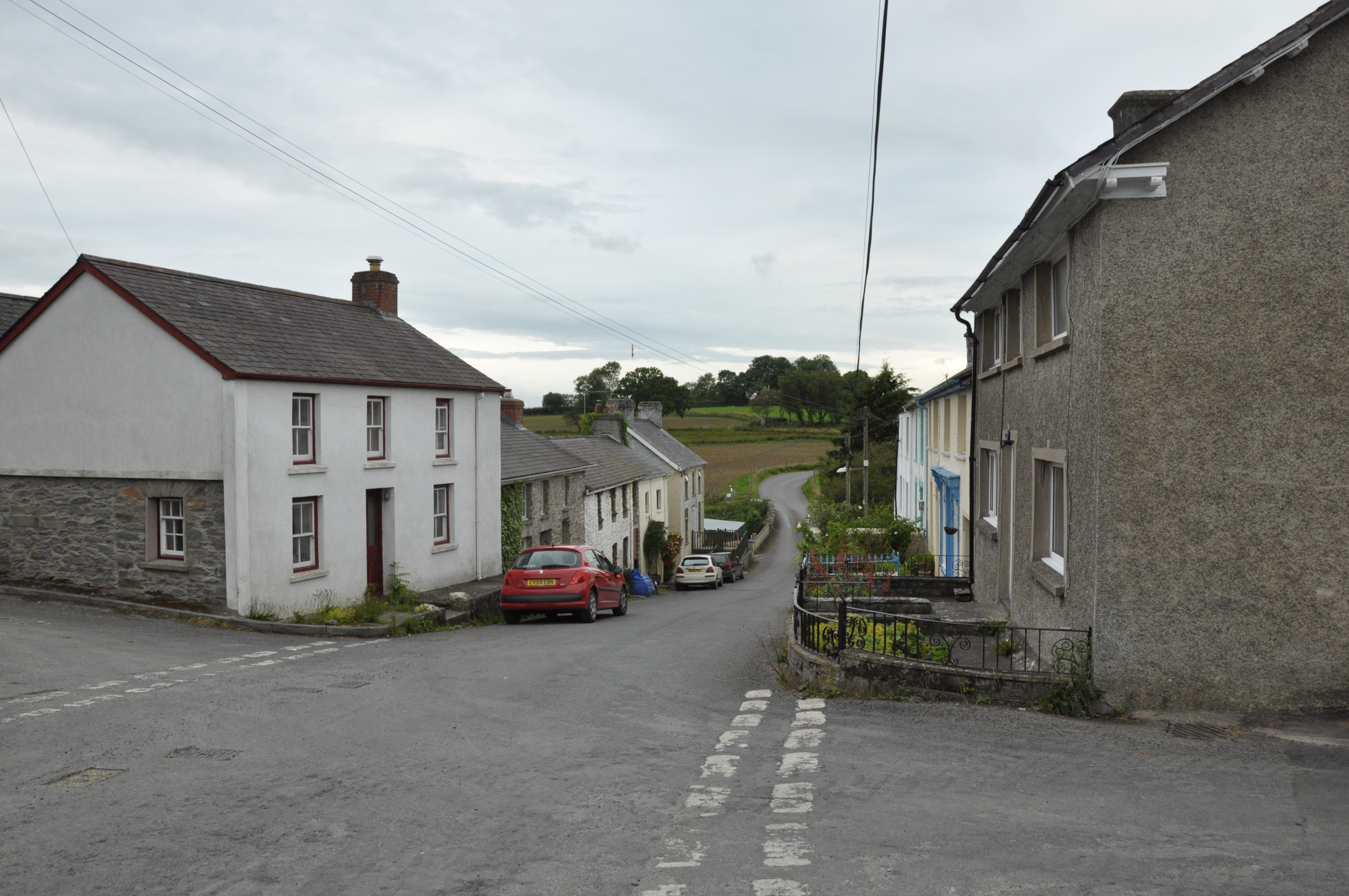

- Location within Ceredigion
- OS grid reference: SN692662
- Principal area: Ceredigion
- Preserved county: Dyfed
- Country: Wales
- Sovereign state: United Kingdom
- Post town: Ystrad Meurig
- Postcode district: SY25
- Police: Dyfed-Powys
- Fire: Mid and West Wales
- Ambulance: Welsh
- UK Parliament: Ceredigion Preseli
- Senedd Cymru – Welsh Parliament: Ceredigion

Swyddffynnon is a village in Ceredigion, Wales, situated 3.75 miles (6 km) to the north of Tregaron, near the northern edge of Cors Caron (Tregaron Bog). Swyddffynnon lies within the parish of Lledrod Uchaf (Welsh for 'upper Lledrod').

== Geology ==
The solid geology of the area comprises Silurian mudstone of the Derwenlas Formation. Part of the village lies within the valley of the Camddwr Fach stream, the floodplain of which contains superficial deposits of glacial till (Devensian diamicton).

== History ==
The name Swyddffynnon is a contraction of Swydd-y-ffynnon-oer (English: administrative area of the cold well/spring). The 'swydd' element being added to its earlier name 'Fennanoyr' (English: cold well/spring), which is first mentioned in the late 12th century, when the area was granted by Rhys ap Gruffudd to Strata Florida Abbey. Fennanoyr may have been a bond settlement or an administrative focus for the monastic grange of Mefenydd.

After the Dissolution all of Strata Florida's lands were granted to the Earl of Essex. Soon after, the land around Swyddffynnon appears to have been purchased by the Lloyds of Ffos-y-bleiddiaid (English: moat/ditch of the wolves) and later acquired by the Vaughans of Trawscoed (English; Crosswood).

The nature of the settlement prior to the 18th century remains obscure, but the fact that it does not appear on John Speed's 1610 map of Cardiganshire suggests that at the time it was very small. Later 18th and early 19th century maps depict the area very much as it appears today with scattered farms and small enclosures that give little indication as to when they were established.

== Religion ==
There are two dissenting chapels in Swyddffynnon, the earliest of which is the Welsh Calvinistic Methodist Chapel. This denomination started meeting in 1743; the chapel was built c 1753, and rebuilt in 1783, 1809 and 1837. The second institution is the Bethel Welsh Baptist Chapel, which was built in 1824, rebuilt 1859 and modified in 1868 and 1898. Both chapels remain open.

== Education ==
In the early 19th century Sunday Schools were held in the Welsh Calvinistic Methodist Chapel. The only formal school was Ysgol Swyddffynnon (Swyddffynnon Primary School), which opened in 1896 and closed in 2006 due to a lack of pupils. The nearest alternative primary school is now Ysgol Gynradd Gymunedol Pontrhydfendigaid (Pontrhydfendigaid Community Primary School).
