= Tyncelyn =

Village in Ceredigion, Wales

Coordinates: 52.253170°N 3.990238°W

- Location within Ceredigion
- OS grid reference: SN 6424 6353
  - Cardiff: 63.7 mi (102.5 km)
  - London: 172.6 mi (277.8 km)
- Community: Lledrod
- Principal area: Ceredigion
- Country: Wales
- Sovereign state: United Kingdom
- Post town: Aberystwyth
- Postcode district: SY23
- Police: Dyfed-Powys
- Fire: Mid and West Wales
- Ambulance: Welsh
- UK Parliament: Ceredigion Preseli
- Senedd Cymru – Welsh Parliament: Ceredigion

Tyncelyn is a hamlet in the community of Lledrod, Ceredigion, Wales, which is 63.7 miles (102.5 km) from Cardiff and 172.6 miles (277.7 km) from London. Tyncelyn is represented in the Senedd by Elin Jones (Plaid Cymru) and is part of the Ceredigion Preseli constituency in the House of Commons.

== See also ==
- List of localities in Wales by population
