= Plas Gwyn =

Area of Pentraeth, Anglesey, Wales

Coordinates: 53.279752°N 4.208816°W

- Location within Anglesey
- OS grid reference: SH 5283 7814
  - Cardiff: 131.8 mi (212.1 km)
  - London: 211.2 mi (339.9 km)
- Community: Pentraeth
- Principal area: Anglesey
- Country: Wales
- Sovereign state: United Kingdom
- Post town: Pentraeth
- Police: North Wales
- Fire: North Wales
- Ambulance: Welsh
- UK Parliament: Ynys Môn
- Senedd Cymru – Welsh Parliament: Ynys Môn

Plas Gwyn is an area in the community of Pentraeth, Anglesey, Wales, which is 131.8 miles (212 km) from Cardiff and 211.2 miles (339.8 km) from London.

Plas Gwyn Hall is a Grade II* listed building. Its gardens and park are listed as Grade II on the Cadw/ICOMOS Register of Parks and Gardens of Special Historic Interest in Wales. The hall was built between 1740 and 1750 by William Jones, and became home of the Panton family after Jones' daughter Jane married Paul Panton.

== See also ==
- List of localities in Wales by population
