= Y Llafurwr =

Poem by Iolo Goch

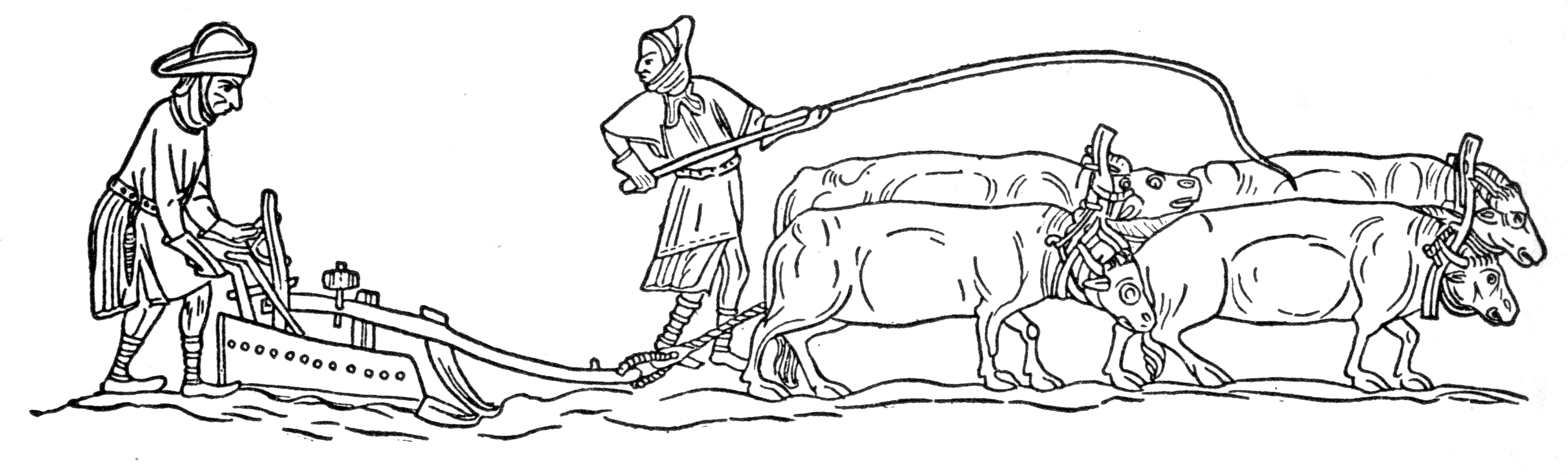
Ploughing with a 14th-century two-handled mouldboard plough such as the poem describes.

"Y Llafurwr", also known in English as "The Ploughman" or "The Labourer", is a cywydd by the 14th-century Welsh Bard Iolo Goch, and one of his most notable poems. The poem has been compared to the finest works of Dafydd ap Gwilym, and its popularity in the Middle Ages can be judged from the fact that it survives in seventy-five manuscripts.

The poem has been compared with William Langland's Middle English Piers Plowman and presents a sympathetic portrayal of the meek and godly ploughman; no other Welsh bardic poem takes an ordinary working man as its subject. The poem was included in The Oxford Book of Welsh Verse.

== Summary ==
The poem begins by picturing all men gathered together on the Day of Reckoning. The peasant who has paid his tithes can then expect his reward, for he is generous and peace-loving, not judgmental, aggressive, larcenous, harsh or fraudulent. Long-suffering and irreplaceable, he follows his plough rather than demolishing towers like some Arthur. Without him there would be no Communion bread, and no pope or king could survive. As the Elucidarium says, the ploughman is blessed. The poem describes the plough itself by the use of a string of metaphors, such as

It's a cradle tearing the smooth long broom,
a fishing basket lacing the field,
a holy image of dear praise,
a heron opening a quick furrow...

The emperor Hu Gadarn took up the plough after his downfall and fed himself, wishing to show that God loves the craft of ploughing above all others. Across Christendom may God and the Virgin Mary protect the ploughman!

== Structure ==
The poem falls into three sharply defined sections. The first comprises the vision of Judgement Day, the list of faults the ploughman does not have, the assertion of his betters' dependence on him, and the quotation from the Elucidarium; the second is the vivid and detailed description of the plough; and the third is the comparison with Hu Gadarn, showing that the ploughman is a figure to respect.

== Date and themes ==
Iolo's career as a poet began in or before 1347 and ended in or after 1397. "The Ploughman"'s place in this time-range cannot be ascertained with certainty, but Dafydd Johnston and Andrew Breeze both argue that it was probably written as a response to the Peasants' Revolt of 1381. W. J. Gruffydd, writing in 1909, read "The Ploughman" as a work in sympathy with the radical and revolutionary tendencies of its time. In the view of later critics, however, when Iolo praises the poem's ideal ploughman he does so from a conservative point of view, stressing the righteous peasant's avoidance of any socially disruptive behaviour, valuing him for the fact that without his labour the pope and the emperor cannot live, and making it clear that his Redemption depends on his payment of tithes. This last point suggests that "The Ploughman" was addressed to Iolo's patrons in the Church, such as the bishops of St Asaph for whom he wrote his first and last poems. Morgan Thomas Davies, while agreeing that this is an essentially conservative poem, sees it as a response not to the English Peasants' Revolt but to the significantly different social and political conditions in post-Conquest Wales, where the decline of arable farming under English absentee landlords and the conversion of much farmland to pasture or even wasteland were issues of great contemporary concern. In these circumstances the ploughman became a symbol of the older Welsh society that was in the process of disappearing, while Hu Gadarn in the poem was perhaps intended as an image of the ideal lord of the old native kind. The ploughman, Davies also suggests, may stand as a metaphor for the poet cultivating his field of praise for his patrons.

== Sources and analogues ==
There are parallels between this poem and several Middle English works, notably William Langland's Piers Plowman and the description of the ploughman in the General Prologue to Chaucer's Canterbury Tales. The resemblances to Piers Plowman are particularly numerous and close, leading Breeze to conclude that Iolo consciously drew on that poem, though Dafydd Johnston and Glanmor Williams have each argued that Iolo, Langland and Chaucer were all influenced by a common source, the body of Middle English sermons on social themes.

The passage on Hu Gadarn is certainly inspired by the character Hugue li Forz in the 12th-century chanson de geste Le Pèlerinage de Charlemagne, which was translated into Welsh as Pererindod Siarlymaen. The paraphrase from the Elucidarium, which may well have been the germ from which the whole poem grew, was also available to him in a Welsh translation dating from 1346, which survives in The Book of the Anchorite of Llanddewifrefi. The passage from Iolo's poem in which the ploughman is defined by the faults he is not guilty of, with the implication that those in authority do, can be compared with the section of Dafydd ap Gwilym's cywydd "The Wind" in which a series of similar negative statements covertly accuses English law officers of oppressive practices. Finally, Iolo's reference to "Arthur the ravager" suggests that he may have been aware of the triad called "Three Red Ravagers of the Island of Britain", among whom Arthur figures.

== Modern editions ==
- Parry, Thomas, ed. (1962). The Oxford Book of Welsh Verse. Oxford: Oxford University Press. pp. 87–89.
- Johnston, D. R., ed. (1988). Gwaith Iolo Goch. Caerdydd: Gwasg Prifysgol Cymru ar ran Bwrdd Gwybodau Celtaidd Prifysfol Cymru. pp. 122–124. ISBN 0708309879.
- Johnston, Dafydd, ed. (1989). Blodeugerdd Barddas o'r Bedwaredd Ganrif ar Ddeg. Swansea: Cyhoeddiadau Barddas. pp. 118–120. ISBN 1900437295.
- Johnston, Dafydd (1993). Iolo Goch: Poems. Welsh Classics, 5. Llandysul: Gomer. pp. 115, 117. ISBN 0863837077.

== Translations ==
- Bell, H. Idris (1942). "Translations from the Cywyddwyr". The Transactions of the Honourable Society of Cymmrodorion: 137–138.
- Clancy, Joseph P. (1965). Medieval Welsh Lyrics. London: Macmillan. pp. 138–140.
- Graves, Alfred Perceval (1912). Welsh Poetry Old and New in English Verse. London: Longmans, Green. pp. 34–36. A shortened translation
- Johnston, Dafydd, in Medieval Welsh Poems: An Anthology. Translated by Loomis, Richard; Johnston, Dafydd. Binghamton: Medieval & Renaissance Texts & Studies. 1992. pp. 109–111. ISBN 0866981020.
- Johnston, Dafydd (1993). Iolo Goch: Poems. Llandysul: Gomer. pp. 114, 116. ISBN 0863837077. With the Middle Welsh original in parallel text.
- Lloyd, D. M., in Lloyd, D. M.; Lloyd, E. M., eds. (1963) [1953]. A Book of Wales. London: Collins. pp. 151–152. A shortened translation
- Williams, Gwyn, ed. (1974) [1973]. Welsh Poems: Sixth Century to 1600. Berkeley: University of California Press. pp. 59–61. ISBN 9780520026032.
