= Daniel Protheroe =

Welsh composer and conductor

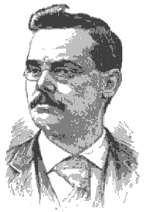
- Born: 5 November 1866; Cwmgiedd, Wales
- Died: 25 February 1934 (aged 67); Chicago, Illinois, United States
- Education: National Eisteddfod; Toronto College of Music
- Occupations: Composer, conductor

Daniel Protheroe (5 November 1866 – 25 February 1934), was a Welsh composer and conductor, born at Cwmgiedd, Brecknockshire. After success at the National Eisteddfod at a young age, he immigrated to the US, where he was educated. He is best known for composing Calvinist Methodist hymns.

== Biography ==
Protheroe was born to Daniel and Eleanor Protheroe, and was instructed in music from a young age. He entered the National Eisteddfod in 1880 and 1881, before his voice broke, winning prizes in both festivals. At the age of 16 he conducted the Ystradgynlais Choir at the Llandeilo Eisteddfod, winning the choir prize. Aged 19, he immigrated to the US, settling in Scranton, Pennsylvania. There he took courses in music conducting, and was tutored by Parson Price, Dudley Buck and Hugo Karn. He graduated with a Bachelor of Music degree from Toronto College of Music, later becoming a Doctor of Music.

Protheroe remained in Scranton until 1892, and for eight years was the conductor of the Cymmrodorion Choral Society. He moved to Milwaukee, conducting several choirs, before moving again, this time to Chicago. He continued conducting for various choirs, and taught at the Sherwood Music School. While in Chicago he mentored Rhys Morgan ("The Welsh Tenor" 1892–1961) and Haldor Lillenas (1885–1959).

Protheroe would take frequent trips to Wales, and adjudicated at several National Eisteddfodau. He wrote several works, including Arwain Corau (1914) and Nodau Damweiniol a D'rawyd (1924), and in 1918 he edited the hymnal Cân a Mawl for the Calvanistic Methodists of North America. He composed many or arranged hymnal works, especially for the male voice, including 'Price', 'Bryn Calfaria', 'Cwmgiedd' and 'Nidaros'. He also composed two string quartets and a symphonic poem.

He died in Chicago on 25 February 1934, and in 1954 a memorial plaque was unveiled at his birthplace in Ystradgynlais.

== Bibliography ==
- Davies, John; Jenkins, Nigel (2008). The Welsh Academy Encyclopaedia of Wales. Cardiff: University of Wales Press. ISBN 978-0-7083-1953-6.
- Howard, John Tasker (1939). Our American Music: Three Hundred Years of It. New York: Thomas Y. Crowell Company.
