= Samuel Maurice Jones =

Welsh landscape painter (1853–1932)

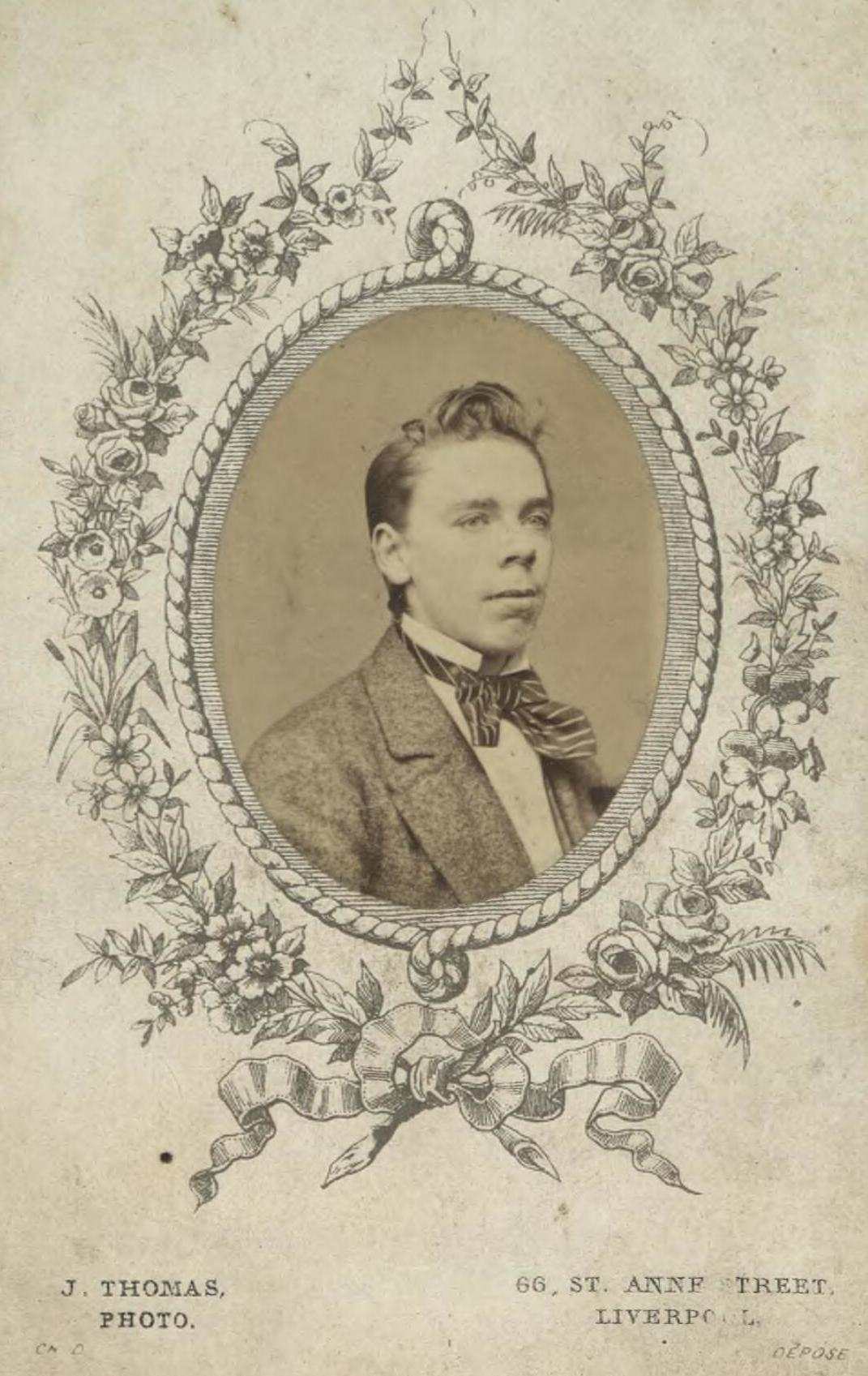
Portrait of Samuel Maurice Jones

Samuel Maurice Jones R.C.A. (1853 – 30 December 1932) was a Welsh landscape painter and illustrator, particularly active in North Wales. Working principally in watercolour, Jones made numerous studies and paintings of the fields near Caernarfon and the Conwy Valley. Many of these rural studies have an idealised, pastoral, character suggestive of the English picturesque and Romantic landscape traditions originating in the works of John Constable and developed by J.M.W Turner.

== Early life ==
Samuel Maurice Jones was born in Mochdre, a coastal village in north-east Wales near Colwyn Bay. His father, Rev. John Jones, was a Calvinistic Methodist minister. Jones was trained first at the Caernarfon School of Art under the tutelage of John Cambrian Rowland and later, in London where he studied under William Collingwood between 1870 and 1873. Collingwood was an Associate of the Society of Painters in Watercolours and offered Jones a thorough and traditional training in the fundamentals of arts education; schooling him in the importance of line and composition, shading, drawing carefully from nature and drawing from memory. The first entry in the study book documenting his lesson with Collingwood on Monday, 11 April 1870, recalls his teachers' words: 'You must regard your hand as an instrument requiring to be taught how to execute with certainty and freedom, every mental command.'

While he was in London, Jones met two figures closely associated with the Pre-Raphaelite Brotherhood: the art critic, John Ruskin, and the painter, Holman Hunt, who reviewed and offered constructive criticism of his work. Shortly afterwards Jones returned to Caernarfon in order to pursue his career as an artist.

== Early work ==
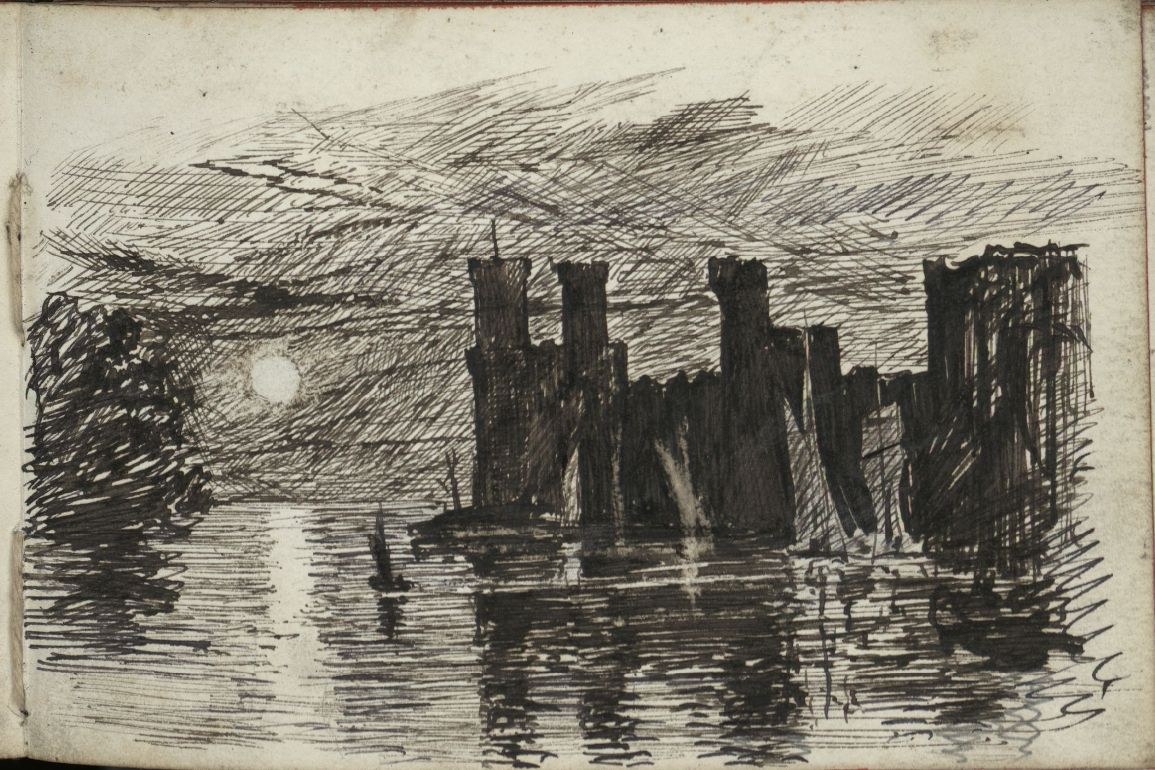
Ink study of Caernarfon Castle from a 1874 sketchbook by Samuel Maurice Jones.

Jones' early sketchbooks attest to the influence of the British Romantic painters, particularly J.M.W. Turner. A small, leather-bound copy book and sketchbook dated 1874 by Jones, includes a copy of Turner's painting Crossing the Brook, exhibited in the National Gallery in 1815. An inscription later in the small notebook reads: The Crossing the Brook is one of those pictures of Turner's which every one admires... The view is taken from the banks of Tamar, that divides Devonshire from Cornwall. It is possible that the first study in the 1874 notebook, a gothic ink study of Caernarfon Castle by moonlight, is modelled on Turner's painting of Caernarfon Castle c. 1798, though Jones may well have brought his first-hand knowledge of the castle to bear on this study.

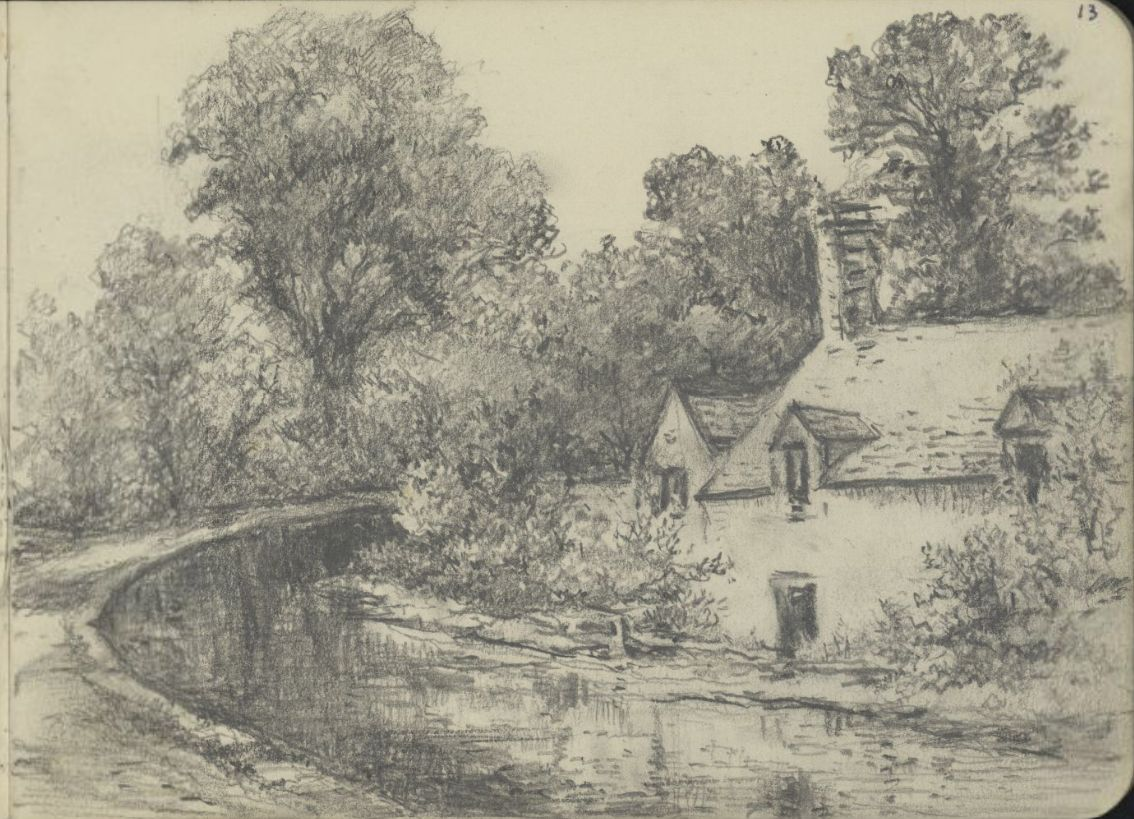
Pencil drawing from one of Jones' sketchbooks, ca 1890, NLW.

In addition to Turner, the sketchbook contains copies of works by Claude and Richard Wilson, an influential Welsh landscape painter and founding member of the Royal Academy. The notebook also includes copied-out sections from the fourth and fifth volumes of John Ruskin's Modern Painters, a standard textbook for art students of that period, which inspired the Pre-Raphaelite painters John Everett Millais and Holman Hunt.

Though the 1974 notebook contains a number of street scenes and impressionistic figure and portrait studies, it is evident that from the time of his artistic training onwards, Jones' primary interest lay in depicting landscapes. The notebook of his lessons under Collingwood between 1870 and 1873 report that Jones was encouraged to go on frequent sketching trips back home in Wales, including to Betws-y-Coed, drawing directly from nature. Jones continued this practice of drawing en plein aire after his return from London, as his sketchbooks of the 1880s and 1890s suggest.

== Later work ==
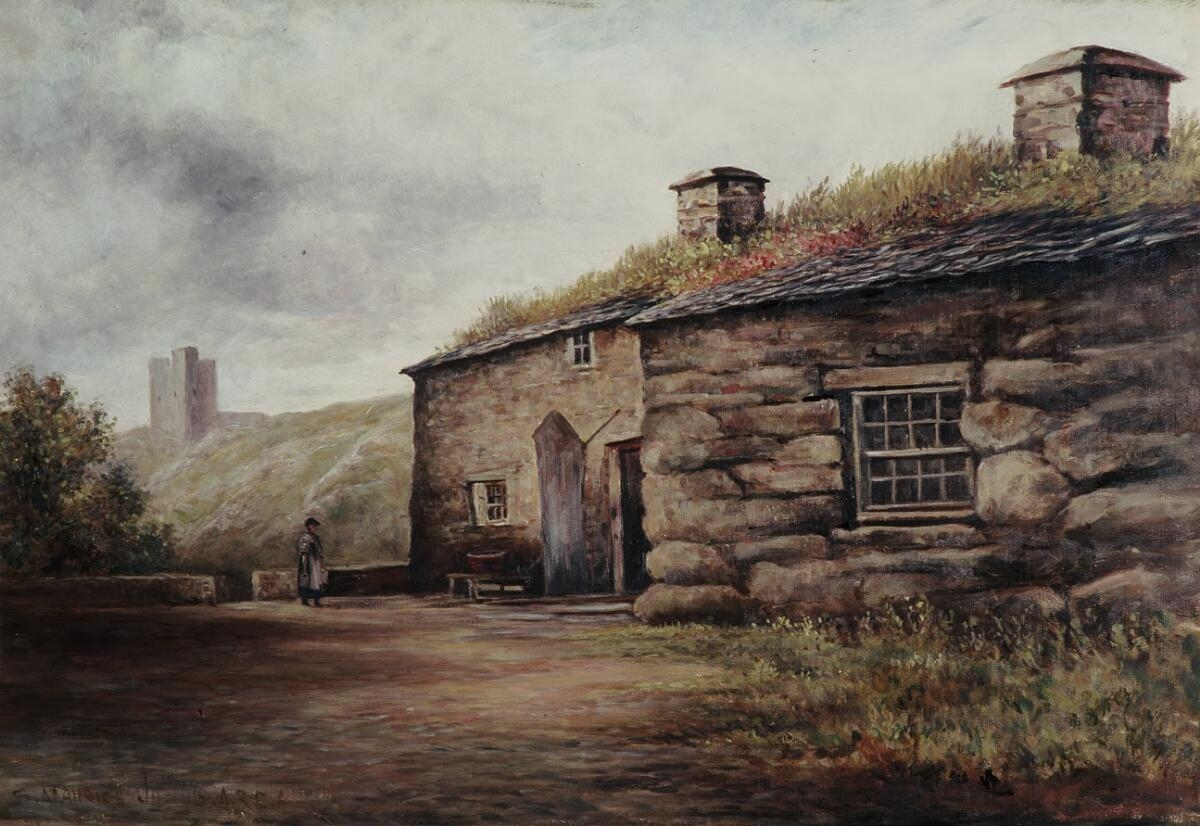
Tan y Castell, Dolwyddelan, c. 1880

Jones' watercolours of the 1880s depict conventional rural scenes featuring quaint cottages, deserted castles, shaded country lanes and rivers, and often, single, solitary figures, passing through or at work in the landscape. Such visions of country life are consistent with fashions in late Victorian landscape painting as exemplified by the works of Henry John Kinnaird, and the women artists Kate Greenaway and Helen Allingham. However, as paintings of Caernarfon street life, such as Hole in the Wall, and the carefully described exterior walls of Tan y Castell (c.1880) suggest, Jones also had a keen interest in urban architecture, engineering and building design.

He executed some of his work in oils. Several examples of his work are held at Caernarfon Archives, including the original artwork for the illustrations in ''Cartrefi Cymru'' (O.M. Edwards).

== Marriage ==
Samuel Maurice Jones married Jane Jones on 14 December 1892 in a Calvinistic Methodist ceremony. According to the marriage certificate, the wedding was conducted at the Moriah chapel in Caernarfon and the artist was forty years old and his wife thirty-four, at the time of marriage.

== Further interests ==
Samuel Maurice Jones was a fluent Welsh language speaker. Though many of Jones' early private notebooks and sketchbooks dating to the period of his artistic training in London (c.1870) are written in English, most of his writings dating to later periods in his life, from the 1880s onwards, are written in Welsh. This growing interest in the Welsh language is reflected by Jones' wider interests. Jones contributed articles and illustrations to the Welsh-focused literary publication Cymru ('Wales') edited by Owen M. Edwards. He also designed the front cover of this Welsh serial. In addition to publications, Maurice wrote lectures and public addresses on art and Welsh-interest topics, including on famous Welsh historic personages at the Liverpool Welsh National Society on Friday 9th 1925.

He was an influential member of Clwb Awen a Chân, a men's dining and cultural society in Caernarfon,

== Awards and recognition ==
Though Jones did not attract considerable critical interest in his lifetime, he did meet with moderate professional success. His works were exhibited in London, Liverpool, Southport and Manchester. He was also a founding member of the Royal Cambrian Academy in Conway, where he exhibited annually. In 1882 Jones was elected as an Associate Member of the Royal Cambrian Academy and elected as a full member in 1921, eleven years before his death. The artist died in Llandudno 30 December 1932.

== Gallery ==
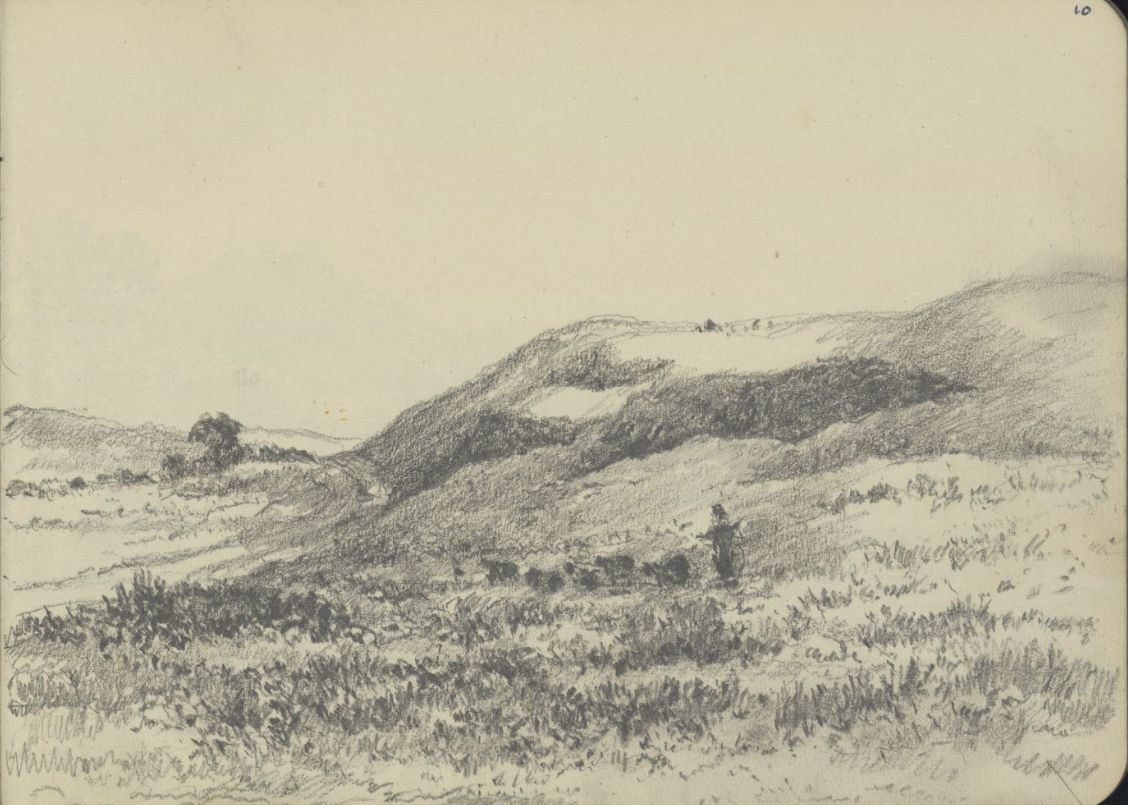
Outdoor sketch from Jones' 1890 sketchbook, NLW collection

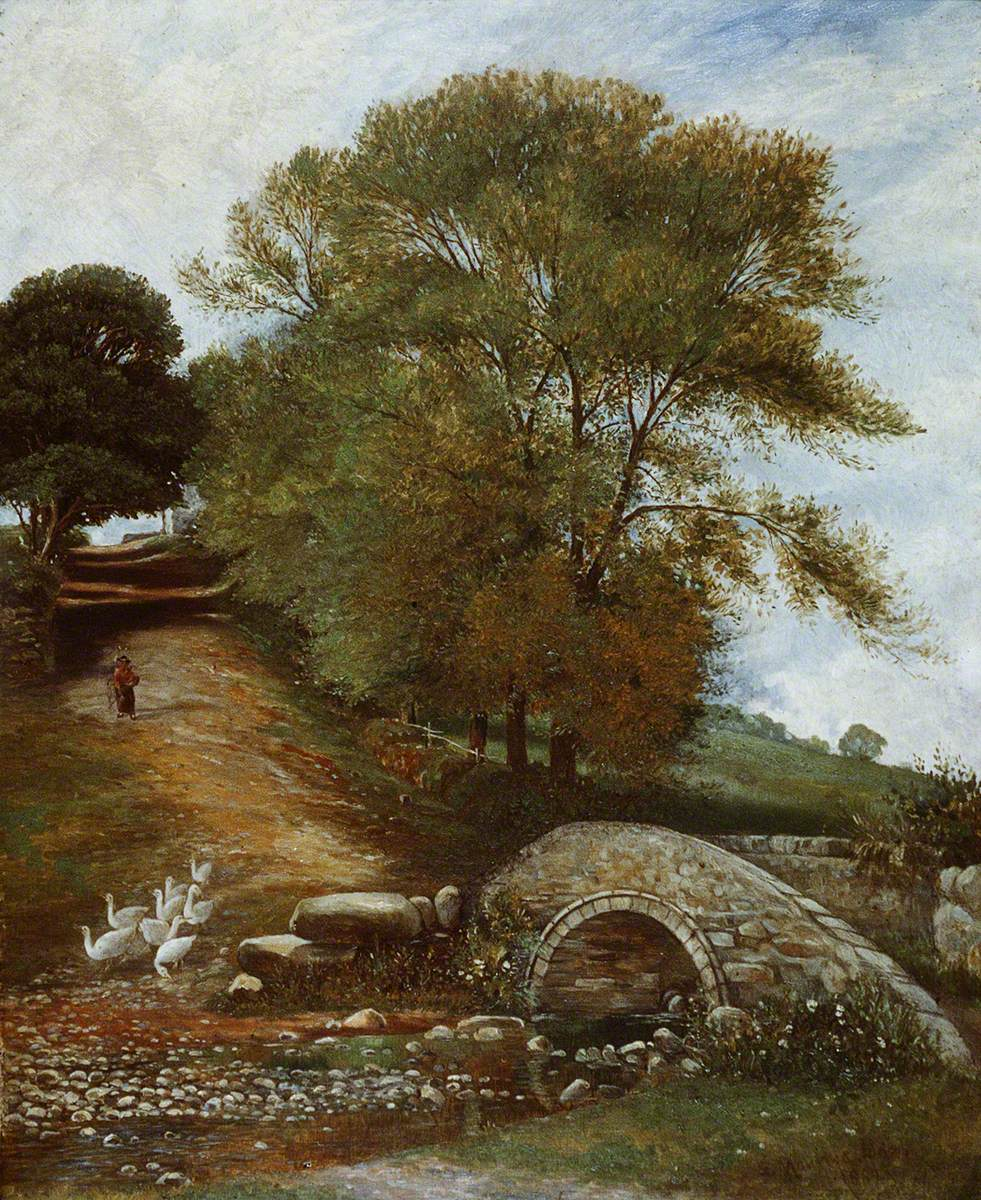
Maesincla Road, near Caernarvon, 1889, oil on canvas

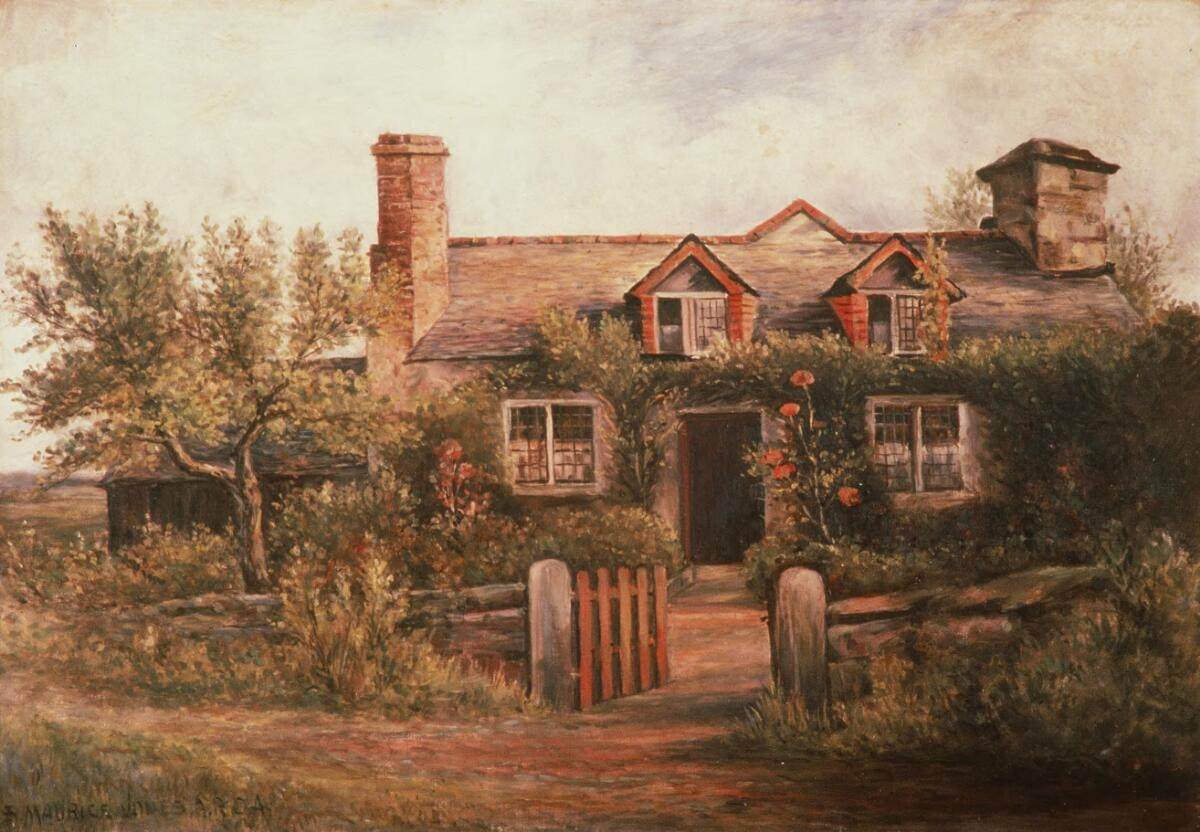
Tan y Celyn, Trefriw c. 1908
