= Samuel Jones (Massachusetts politician) =

American politician

Samuel Jones (December 22, 1778 – October 29, 1862) was an American politician.

== Early life and education ==
He was born at Hebron, Connecticut, on December 22, 1778. He was the third son of Samuel and Lydia (Tarbox) Jones. He was fitted for college under the tuition of Rev. Dr. Amos Bassett, of his native parish. He graduated from Yale College in 1800. He studied law in the office of Hon. Sylvester Gilbert, of Hebron, with whom for a short time he practiced his profession, after having been admitted, in September 1803, to the bar of Tolland County, Connecticut.

== Career ==
In 1804 he removed to Glastonbury, Connecticut, and in 1808 to Stockbridge, Massachusetts, where he practiced his profession till the spring of 1845. About 1840 he published a Treatise on the Right of Suffrage. He represented Stockbridge, on several occasions, in the Massachusetts Legislature, was at one time a member of the electoral college, and in 1843 he was appointed one of the Commissioners of the State of Massachusetts to assist in setting off land to the settlers on the N E. boundary of Maine, in accordance with the Webster–Ashburton Treaty. From 1845 to 1849, he was an Inspector of the Port of Boston, and from then till 1851 he continued to reside in that city. He subsequently returned to Stockbridge, and in 1853 retired from active business, passing the remainder of his life with his children in different places. He died at the residence of his son (Ralph K. Jones, M D.,) in Bangor, Maine, Oct. 29, 1862. His remains were interred in Stockbridge.
