= John Cambrian Rowland =

Welsh painter (1819–1890)

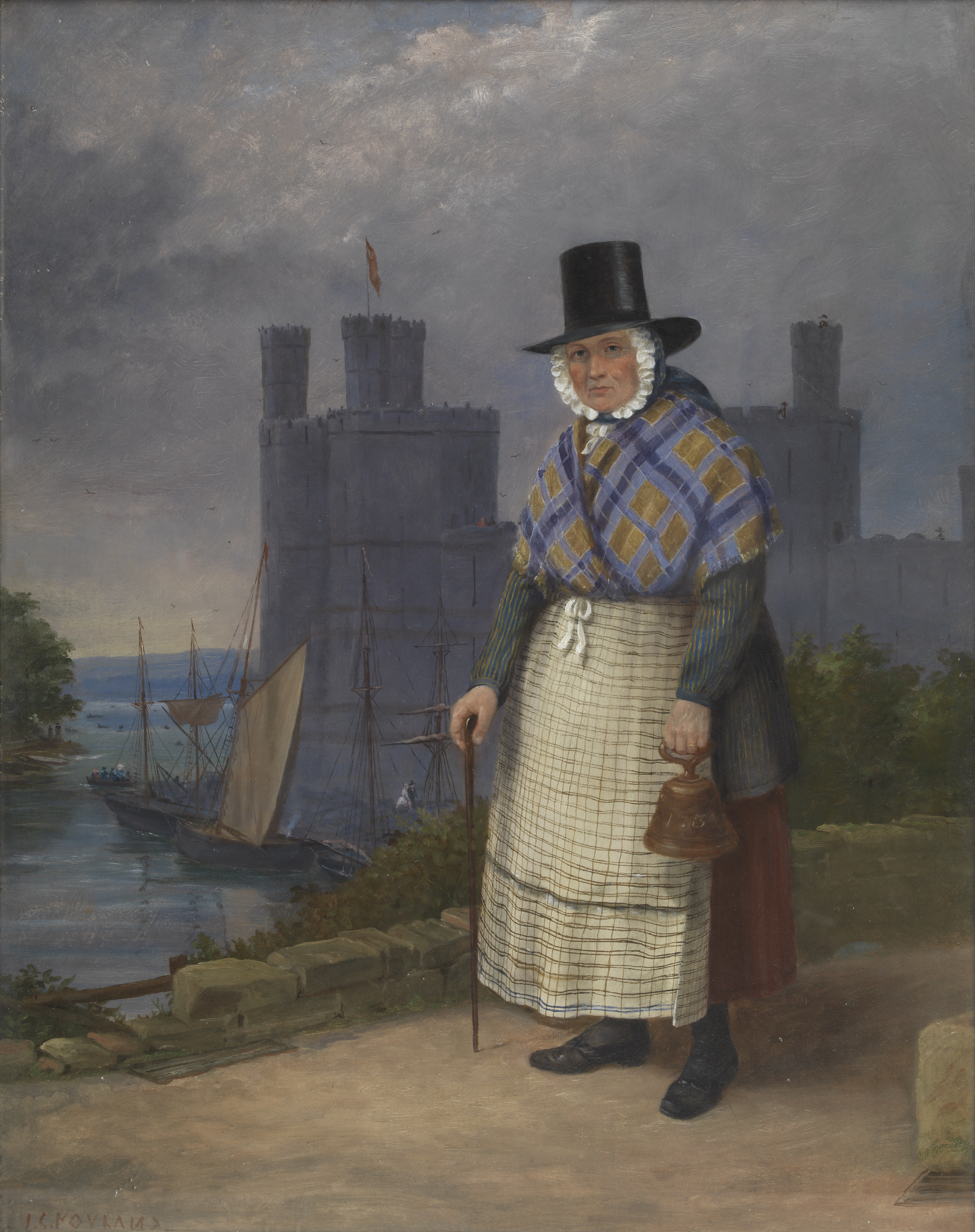
'Bellringer of Caernarvon To us costume of trade' with John Cambrian Rowland

John Cambrian Rowland (7 December 1819 – 1890) was a Welsh painter.

Rowland was born in Lledrod, Ceredigion, the son of Thomas Rowlands. It appears that he was the first professional artist to live in Aberystwyth.

The earliest instance of his work that is available is his outline drawing of John Williams (Shon Sgubor) that he drew in 1839, and was published in Wales, volume 15 (1898), p. 113. Another portrait of the Rev. John Hughes is held at the National Library of Wales.

John Cambrian Rowland is mainly remembered for his collection of Welsh costume prints - many of these were published in 1848. These have become standard images of 19th century Welsh life. The contents of his paintings suggest that he settled in north Wales, and one biography suggests that he was appointed as an art instructor at the Caernarvon Church Training College.

== Europeana 280 ==
In April 2016 the painting was selected as one of Wales' ten iconic paintings as part of the Europeana art project

== Bibliography ==
Paul Joyner, Artists in Wales c.1740-c.1851, p. 110
