= Ieuan Brydydd Hir =

15th-century Welsh poet

Ieuan Brydydd Hir (fl. 1450 – 1485) was a Welsh language poet from Ardudwy in Meirionnydd, north-west Wales. He sang on mainly religious subjects. Thirteen poems accepted as his work are extant, although a number of others are attributed to him.

== Bibliography ==
- M. Paul Bryant-Quinn (ed.), Gwaith Ieuan Brydydd Hir (Aberystwyth, 2000). The only full edition of his work.
