= Nigel Heseltine =

British writer (1916–1995)

Nigel Heseltine (3 July 1916 – 1995) was an English author of travel books, short stories, plays, and poetry, as well as an agronomist for the Food and Agriculture Organization of the United Nations.

== Biography ==
Heseltine was born in London in 1916, the son of composer Philip Heseltine, better known as Peter Warlock. His mother is often reported to be Philip Heseltine's wife, Minnie Lucy Channing, an occasional model for Augustus John, nicknamed "Puma". His birth was not registered until 1930. However, in his memoir Capriol for Mother, Heseltine states that his mother was a Swiss woman, a friend of Juliette Huxley. There is no record of his birth in the hospital where it allegedly took place, and for the first year of his life he was raised by foster-parents. He spent most of his childhood in Wales with Warlock's mother and Welsh stepfather at Cefn Bryntalch, Llandyssil, and attended Shrewsbury School.

In 1937 he travelled on foot across Albania and wrote of his experience in Scarred Background. In 1938 he married Natalia Borisovna Galitzine or Galitzina, an aristocrat in Budapest. He married four more times. During World War II he was in Dublin, working as a playwright for the Olympia Theatre company of Shelagh Richards (1903–1985).

In the 1950s he was based in Rome working as an agronomist for the United Nations Food and Agriculture Organization. During this time he travelled widely across Africa, eventually settling in Madagascar for twelve years, and then on Rodrigues as Resident Commissioner. Later he wrote several books about Africa, including From Libyan Sands to Chad (an account of crossing the Sahara) and Madagascar.

Towards the end of his career he was employed by the Department of Aboriginal Affairs of Western Australia, travelling extensively in the Outback. He retired in Perth, where he died in 1995.

== Works ==
- Scarred Background (a Journey Through Albania) (1938)
- Violent Rain: a Poem The Latin Press (1938)
- The Four-Walled Dream: Poems The Fortune Press (1941)
- Dafydd ap Gwilym, Selected poems (1944, Cuala Press) translator
- Tales of the Squirearchy, Druid Press, 1946
- The Mysterious Pregnancy: a novel (published as Inconstant Lady in the U.S.A.) 1953
- From Libyan Sands to Chad (1959)
- Remaking Africa (1961)
- Twenty-five Poems, Dafydd ap Gwilym (1968, Piers Press, reprint of 1944 book) translator
- Madagascar (1971)
- Capriol for Mother (1992), a memoir of Peter Warlock and his family by his son
- A Day's Pleasure and Other Tales (2023), reprint of Tales of the Squirearchy and previously unpublished or uncollected stories
