= Lledrod =

Village and community in Ceredigion, Wales

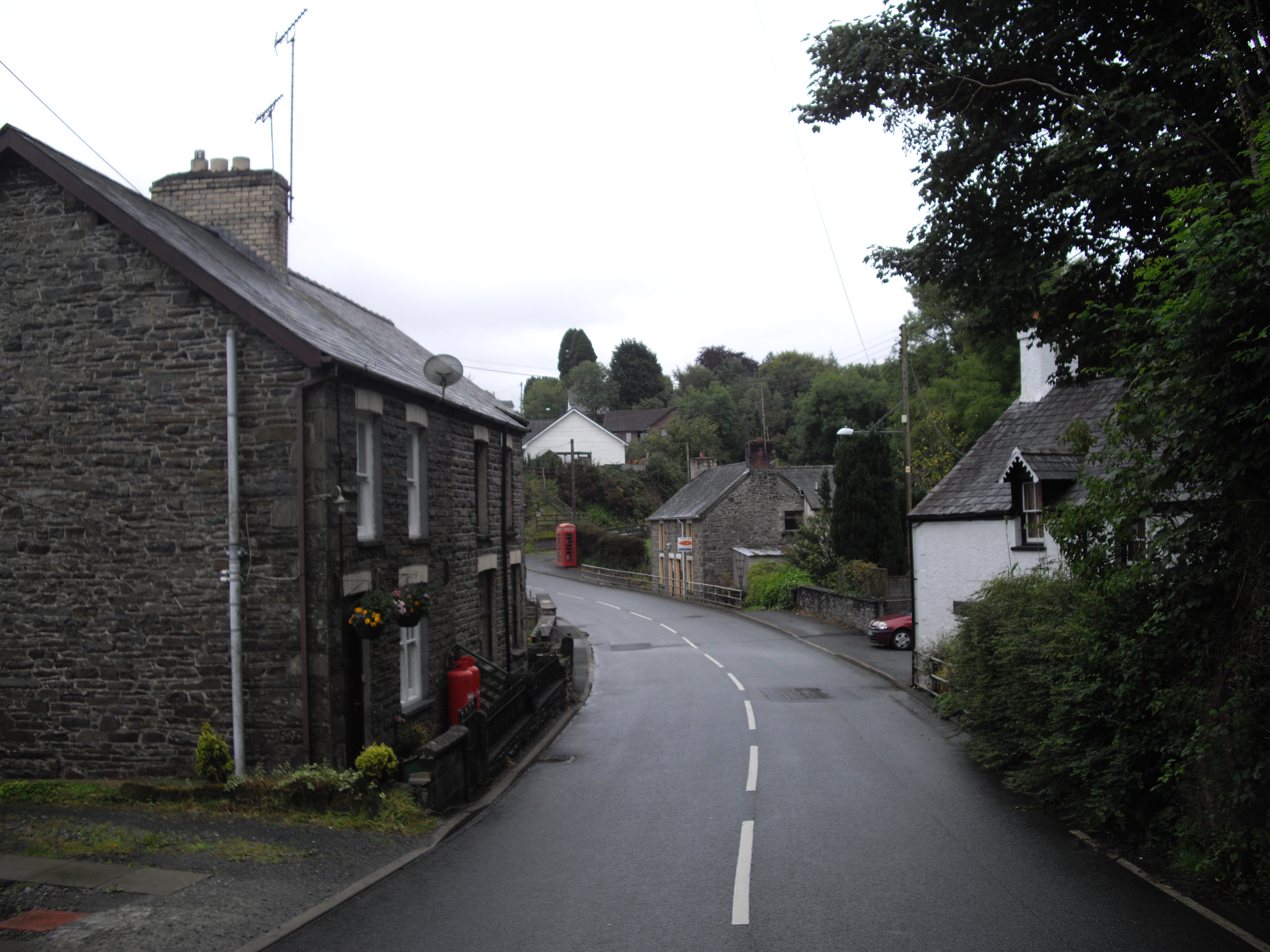
- A 485 through Lledrod

- Location within Ceredigion
- Population: 735 (2011)
- OS grid reference: SN645703
- Principal area: Ceredigion
- Preserved county: Dyfed
- Country: Wales
- Sovereign state: United Kingdom
- Post town: Aberystwyth
- Postcode district: SY23
- Police: Dyfed-Powys
- Fire: Mid and West Wales
- Ambulance: Welsh
- UK Parliament: Ceredigion Preseli
- Senedd Cymru – Welsh Parliament: Ceredigion Penfro
- List of places UK Wales Ceredigion 52.314713°N 3.989050°W Community map: Map of the community

Lledrod is a village and community in Ceredigion, Wales. The village is situated on the A485 road from Llanilar to Tregaron, where it crosses the valley of the River Wyre (Welsh: Afon Wyre). The parish is divided into Lledrod Isaf (Lower Lledrod) and Lledrod Uchaf (Upper Lledrod); Lledrod village is located in the former, Swyddffynnon village is situated in the latter. The name 'Lledrod' is a contraction of Llanfihangel-Lledrod, which derives from Llanfihangel Llether-troed, meaning 'the church of St Michael at the foot of the slope'. The community includes the small settlements of Tyncelyn and Blaenpennal.

== Geology ==
The solid geology of the area comprises Silurian mudstone of the Borth Mudstone Formation, which are partially overlain by superficial deposits of glacial till (Devensian diamicton).

== History ==
=== Lledrod village ===
The 'llan' element of Llanfihangel-Lledrod suggests that the parish church was established in the early medieval period. The nature of the settlement prior to the 18th century remains obscure, but by 1610 it was significant enough to be included on John Speed's map of Cardiganshire.

== Religion ==
The Anglican parish church is dedicated to St Michael. The 'llan' element of the village's original name suggests that the church was founded in the early medieval period. The present church was built in 1883. There are a number of non-conformist chapels in lledrod parish, one of which, Rhydlwyd Calvinistic Methodist Chapel, is located on the northern edge of the village. This denomination started meeting in 1745; the first chapel was built c 1755, and rebuilt in 1783, 1809 and 1837. The present chapel was built in 1833 and rebuilt in 1899. The chapel remained open in 2006.

== Education ==
A free grammar school was founded in the village in 1745 by the Rev. Thomas Oliver. Ysgol Gynradd Lledrod (Lledrod Primary School) was built in 1877, but is now closed. The nearest alternative school is Ysgol Gynradd Llanilar, or Rhos y Wlad in Bronant.

== Governance ==
An electoral ward with the same name exists. This stretches beyond the confines of Lledrod Community with a total population at the 2011 Census of 2,209.

== Demography ==
In 2021, the community had an estimated population of 694, 98.7% of whom are White, 0.9% are Asian, and 0.4% have a mixed ethnic background. The religious makeup of the district is recorded as: 57.2% Christian, 40.7% No Religion, 1.2% Buddhist and 0.9% other religions.

== Notable residents ==
- Evan Evans (1731–1789), poet, born and died in Cynhawdref, Lledrod, and was buried in the churchyard of St Michael's church.
- Evan Davies (1805–1864), a Welsh Protestant Christian missionary among the Chinese in Malaysia in Penang
- John Cambrian Rowland (1819–1890), a Welsh painter, mainly of Welsh costume prints
- Richard Edwards (1822–1908), a Welsh American educator, emigrated to Ohio aged 11, where he taught astronomy, physics, map-drawing and geography.
- Lt. Colonel John Rea (1868–1944), footballer who played for West Bromwich Albion, with nine caps for Wales
- B. T. Hopkins (1897–1981), a Welsh poet and a noteworthy judge of the National Eisteddfod
