= Arthur James Johnes =

Welsh county court judge (1809-1871)

Arthur James Johnes (4 February 1809 – 23 July 1871) was a Welsh county court judge.

== Biography ==
Johnes was born on 4 February 1809, the only son of Edward Johnes of Garthmyl, near Montgomery, by Mary, daughter of Thomas Davies of Llifior. He was educated at Oswestry grammar school, and at the university of London (now University College) when it was opened in 1828. After attending the lectures of Austin and Andrew Amos, Johnes won at the end of the session 1828–9 the first 'highest prize' and certificate of honour granted by the university (London University Calendar for 1831, p. 203). He was admitted member of Lincoln's Inn on 27 January 1830, was called to the bar on 30 January 1835 and afterwards practised as an equity draughtsman and conveyancer. On the establishment of county courts in 1847 Johnes became judge of the district comprising all North-west Wales and a considerable part of South Wales. This office he held until December 1870. He died on 23 July 1871 and was buried in the parish of Berriew.

As a legal writer Johnes was much influenced by the writings of Bentham. He advocated in various pamphlets, issued between 1834 and 1869, the fusion of law and equity, the establishment of local courts for the recovery of small debts, the extension of the jurisdiction and the improvement of the procedure of the county courts, the abolition of imprisonment for debt, reform of the bankruptcy laws, and even such a fusion of the two branches of the legal profession as would enable clients to retain barristers themselves. Some of these proposals he lived to see adopted.

Johnes was an ardent student of Welsh literature. He was one of the promoters of the Cambrian Quarterly Magazine (1829–1833) (Literary Remains of the Rev. Thomas Price, ii. 97), to which he contributed articles under the signature of ‘Maelog,’ and under the same name published in 1834 some admirable English translations of poems by Dafydd ap Gwilym. In 1831 Johnes won the prize offered by the Cymmrodorion Society for an essay on the causes of dissent in Wales, under the title 'An Essay on the Causes which have produced Dissent from the Established Church in the Principality of Wales.' It was published by the society, and to a second edition, published in 1832, he added copious historical and statistical details. A third edition was published in 1870 (Llanidloes, 8vo). This was the first successful attempt by a churchman to expose the abuses of the establishment in Wales–pluralism, nepotism, absenteeism, and the promotion of English-speaking clergy to Welsh-speaking parishes. Johnes wrote as a staunch friend of the church, and in 1837 he published in pamphlet form a correspondence on the subject with Lord John Russell, In the following year Johnes actively and successfully resisted Lord John's scheme for the union of the sees of Bangor and St. Asaph, and the appropriation of the income of one of them to the newly created see of Manchester. He published in 1841 ‘Statistical Illustrations of the Claims of the Welsh Dioceses to Augmentation out of the Funds at the disposal of the Ecclesiastical Commissioners, in a Letter to Lord John Russell,’ London, 8vo; and in 1843, ‘Philological Proofs of the original unity and recent origin of the Human Race,’ London, 8vo. A new edition of the latter appeared in 1846.
