= Nantmor =

Hamlet in Gwynedd, Wales

Coordinates: 52.993°N 4.080°W

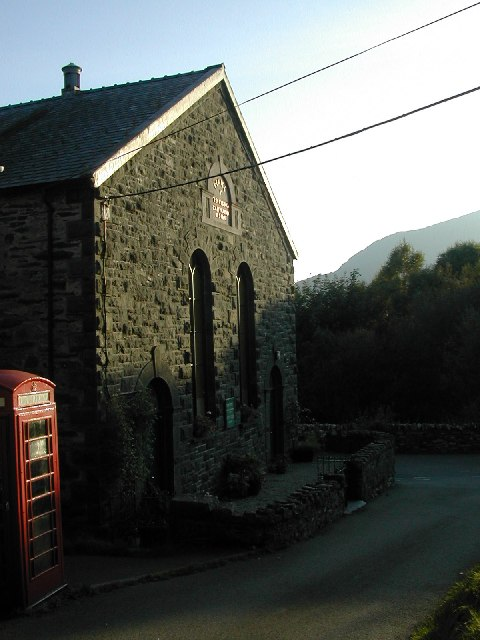
- The chapel at Nantmor

- Location within Gwynedd
- OS grid reference: SH604460
- Community: Beddgelert
- Principal area: Gwynedd
- Country: Wales
- Sovereign state: United Kingdom
- Post town: CAERNARFON
- Postcode district: LL55
- Dialling code: 01766
- Police: North Wales
- Fire: North Wales
- Ambulance: Welsh
- UK Parliament: Dwyfor Meirionnydd
- Senedd Cymru – Welsh Parliament: Dwyfor Meirionnydd

Nantmor is a hamlet which lies about 1½ miles to the south of the village of Beddgelert in Gwynedd, Wales.

The current spelling of the name Nantmor is more modern; most old documents from the 16th to the 18th century record the name as Nanmor.

It lies close to the scenic Aberglaslyn Pass and the Welsh Highland Railway. Nantmor station was re-opened, following a 2007 vote in its favour by local residents.

A car park run by the National Trust is a popular starting point for walks up to Cwm Bychan or along the Afon Glaslyn.

The village is the home of Dafydd Nanmor, a renowned 15th century bard (died c. 1490) who took his name from the hamlet, as did Rhys Nanmor after him. Dafydd Nanmor himself was possibly a bardic student of Rhys Goch, who lived at neighbouring Hafod Garegog.

Filmed in Nantmor in 1957, the Inn of the Sixth Happiness is a 1958 British 20th Century Fox film based on the true story of Gladys Aylward, a tenacious British maid, who became a missionary in China during the tumultuous years leading up to the Second World War.

Carneddi, a nearby hill farm, was the home of Ruth Janette Ruck, who published a trilogy of books about her experiences in the 1950s, 1960s and 1970s, namely Place of Stones, Hill Farm Story and Along Came a Llama. In 1980 she featured in the HTV About Britain series in an episode called "The Lady and the Llama", which featured a year on the farm.
