= The Brahmin and the Mongoose =

Indian folktale

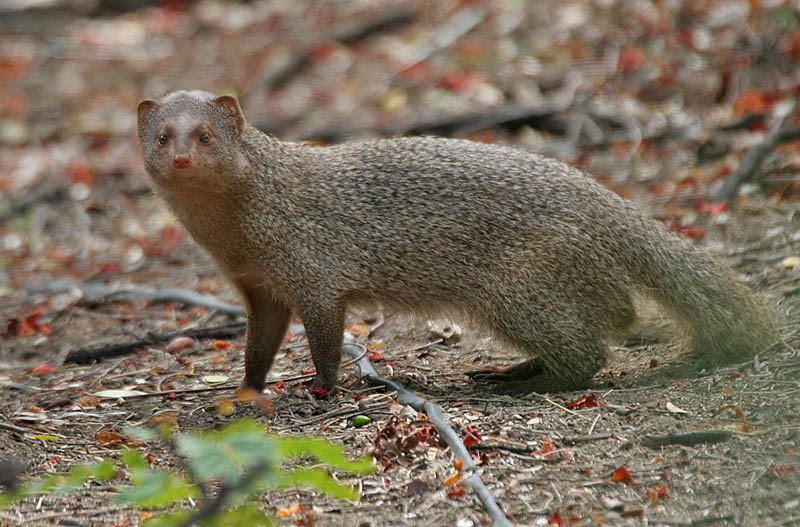
- Indian grey mongoose

Folk tale
- Name: The Brahmin and the Mongoose
- Aarne–Thompson grouping: 178A
- Country: India (origin)

The Brahmin and the Mongoose (or The Brahmin's Wife and the Mongoose) is a folktale from India, and "one of the world's most travelled tales". It describes the rash killing of a loyal animal, and thus warns against hasty action. The story underlies certain legends in the West, such as that of Llywelyn and his dog Gelert in Wales, or that of Saint Guinefort in France. It is classified as Aarne-Thompson type 178A.

== The story ==
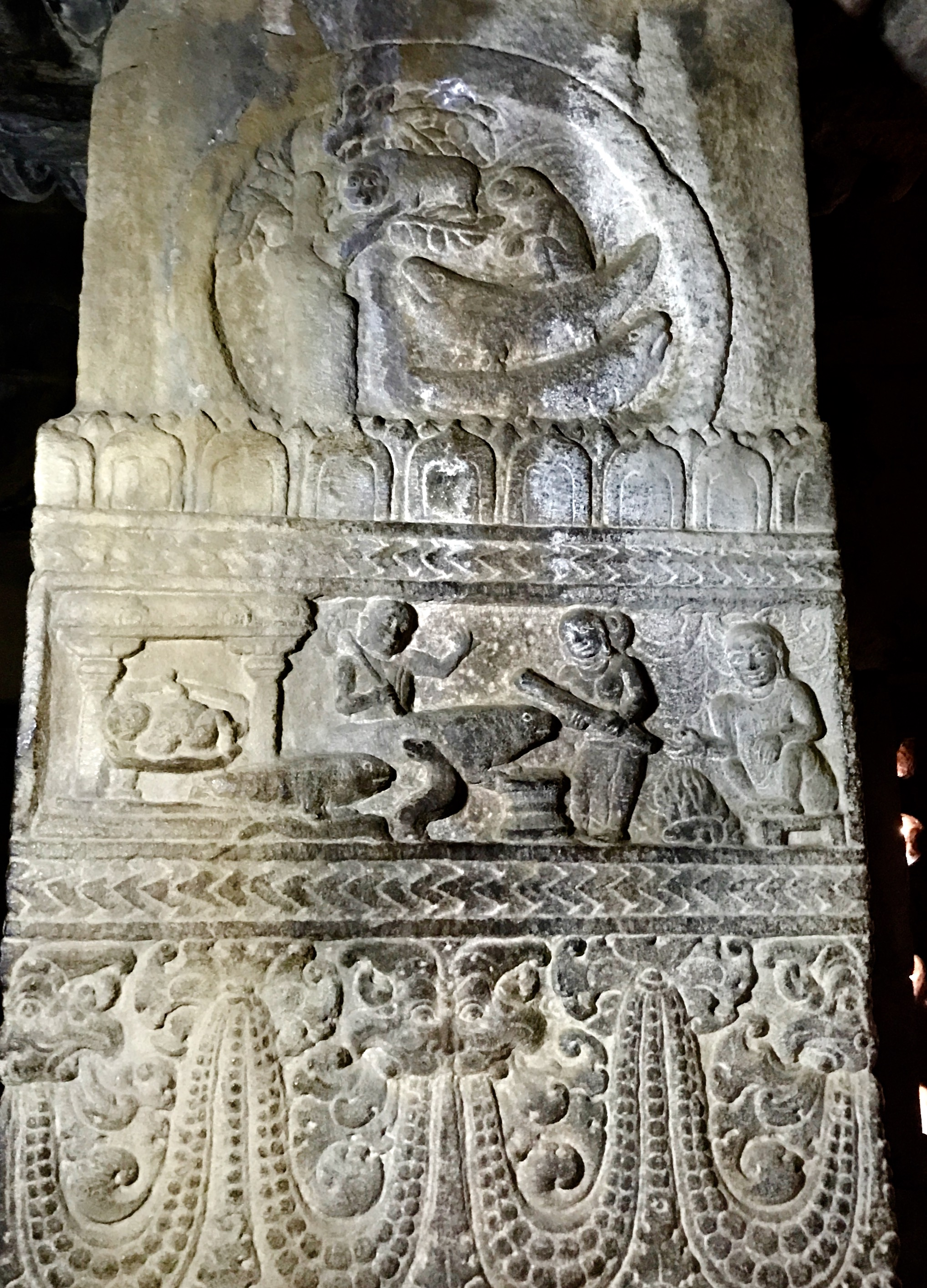
The woman and the mongoose Panchatantra fable is engraved in many historic Hindu temples such as at the 8th-century Virupaksha temple at Pattadakal (the middle panel).

The original version from the Panchatantra in Sanskrit goes as follows (translation from Ryder 1925):

The Loyal Mongoose (Note: The source uses the spelling "mungoose" throughout; the spelling has been here modernized to "mongoose" for consistency with the rest of the article.)
There was once a Brahman named Godly [orig. Devasharma] in a certain town. His wife mothered a single son and a mongoose. And as she loved little ones, she cared for the mongoose also like a son, giving him milk from her breast, and salves, and baths, and so on. But she did not trust him, for she thought: "A mongoose is a nasty kind of creature. He might hurt my boy." [...]
One day she tucked her son in bed, took a waterjar, and said to her husband: "Now, Professor, I am going for water. You must protect the boy from the mongoose." But when she was gone, the Brahman went off somewhere himself to beg food, leaving the house empty.
While he was gone, a black snake issued from his hole and, as fate would have it, crawled toward the baby’s cradle. But the mongoose, feeling him to be a natural enemy, and fearing for the life of his baby brother, fell upon the vicious serpent halfway, joined battle with him, tore him to bits, and tossed the pieces far and wide. Then, delighted with his own heroism, he ran, blood trickling from his mouth, to meet the mother; for he wished to show what he had done.
But when the mother saw him coming, saw his bloody mouth and his excitement, she feared that the villain must have eaten her baby boy, and without thinking twice, she angrily dropped the water-jar upon him, which killed him the moment that it struck. There she left him without a second thought, and hurried home, where she found the baby safe and sound, and near the cradle a great black snake, torn to bits. Then, overwhelmed with sorrow because she had thoughtlessly killed her benefactor, her son, she beat her head and breast.
At this moment the Brahman came home with a dish of rice gruel which he had got from someone in his begging tour, and saw his wife bitterly lamenting her son, the mongoose. "Greedy! Greedy!" she cried. "Because you did not do as I told you, you must now taste the bitterness of a son’s death, the fruit of the tree of your own wickedness. Yes, this is what happens to those blinded by greed...."

In Western variants of the story, other animals take the place of the mongoose, most often a dog. It is also found in other versions as a weasel, cat (in Persia), bear, or lion, and the snake is sometimes replaced with a wolf (in Wales). The essence of the story, however, remains the same. Similarly, variants of the story sometimes have the man, instead of his wife, killing the loyal animal.

The story is sometimes placed within a frame story, where a saviour stands mistakenly accused and narrates this story, thereby preventing his own death.

== Origin and travel ==
The story was first studied in 1859 by Theodor Benfey, the pioneer of comparative literature, when he compared the versions in India, the Middle East and Europe. In 1884, W. A. Clouston showed how it had reached Wales.

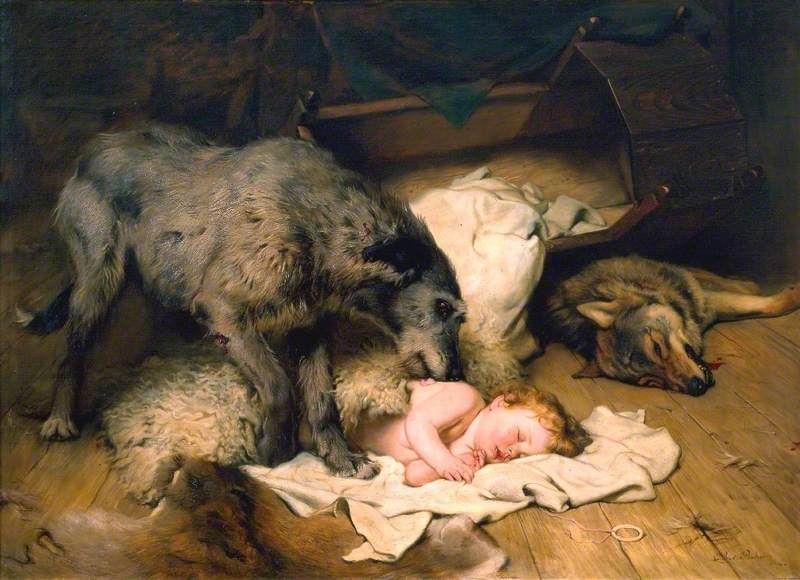
Gelert by Charles Burton Barber (1845–1894)

Murray B. Emeneau considers the migration of this story, through its steps from India to Wales, as "one of the best authenticated cases of such diffusions of folk-tales". It is classified as Aarne-Thompson type 178A.

The story occurs in all versions of the Panchatantra, as well as the later Sanskrit works Hitopadesha and the Kathasaritsagara. It also occurs in most of the languages of India (and South Asia) where it is extremely familiar. For instance, in the South Indian state of Karnataka, the story occurs as a proverb in inscriptions, as a sculpture in a temple, in narratives of travelling storytellers and singers, and in film. Similarly, the Tamil epic Silappatikaram recalls the story simply by its name.

Like the rest of the Panchatantra, in its westward migration it travelled from Sanskrit to Arabic (as Kalila wa Dimna), Persian, Hebrew, Greek, Latin, Old French, and eventually into all the major languages of Europe (as The Fables of Pilpay or Bidpai), ranging from Russian to Gaelic to English. In its eastward migration, it appears in Chinese (ten versions, including in a redaction of the Vinaya Pitaka), and over a wide region from Mongolia to Malaysia. It is also the only story found in all recensions of the Panchatantra, all versions of the "Book of Sindibad" (not Sindbad), and all versions of "The Seven Sages of Rome".

It is also found in Mexico and the United States. Blackburn observes that the fable is not a dead tradition and is still current, as a Belgian newspaper reported it as an anecdote about a man who left his son and dog in a shopping trolley in his car.

The motif also occurs, with a happy ending, in the Disney film Lady and the Tramp (1955).

== Reception and influence ==
The story is often used in culture as an exemplum cautioning against hasty action. It also serves as shorthand for sin, regret and grief.

In Welsh it became the story of the nobleman Llywelyn who kills his loyal dog, Gelert. It was later interpreted as a legend about a true event, and small shrines to the dog exist in Wales (such as in the village of Beddgelert, "Gelert's grave"). In France a similar metamorphosis took larger proportions, and the story became the cult of Saint Guinefort (a dog), which was popular until the 1930s.

Blackburn points out that although in the many literary versions it is the man who kills the mongoose, in most oral versions (and the literary version quoted above), it is the woman who does so.

== See also ==
- Jock of the Bushveld
