= Elizabeth West =

Elizabeth West may refer to:

- Elizabeth West, South Australia, a former suburb of Adelaide, South Australia
- Elizabeth H. West (1893–1948), American librarian and archivist
- Elizabeth West, author of Hovel in the Hills
