= Hafod =

Hafod, a Welsh word meaning a 'summer dwelling', may refer to:

- Hafod estate (Hafod Uchtryd), estate in Ceredigion, Wales
- Hafod Forest, woodland in Ceredigion, Wales
- Hafod, Swansea, district in Swansea, Wales
  - Hafod Copperworks, former copperworks in Swansea, Wales
- Hafod Colliery, former colliery in Wrexham, Wales
  - Bonc yr Hafod / Hafod Community Woodland, country park on the site of the former colliery, in Wrexham, Wales
  - Hafod y Bwch Commemorative Woodland, commemorative woodland to COVID-19 pandemic in Erddig, Wrexham, Wales
- A transhumance system with upland hafod farmhouses, see Agriculture in Wales#History
- A cottage in the book Hovel in the Hills
