= Elegy for Llywelyn ab y Moel =

1440 Welsh-language poem by Guto'r Glyn

"Elegy for Llywelyn ab y Moel" (Welsh: Marwnad Llywelyn ab y Moel) is a cywydd, a Welsh-language poem, by the 15th-century bard Guto'r Glyn written in honour of his elder contemporary and possibly teacher Llywelyn ab y Moel o’r Pantri. Probably written shortly after Llywelyn's death in the abbey of Strata Marcella in 1440, it celebrates Llywelyn's status as a poet, a lover, and a soldier. It is one of two surviving elegies to Llywelyn, the other being by Rhys Goch Eryri.

== Themes ==
The poem expresses sorrow at the loss of Llywelyn's various excellences. Of these, priority of place is given to his martial prowess and his support for the cause of the Welsh national leader Owain Glyndŵr and of a certain Meredudd (possibly Owain's son). He is also praised as a lover, his sweetheart Euron being mentioned by name. But most space is devoted to his distinction as a practitioner of the art and craft of poetry, of which Guto clearly considered him a master, and on the "wound to wordcraft" that his death has brought about. The poem concludes with the image, appropriate to one of the Poets of the Nobility, of Llywelyn in the hall of heaven enjoying the patronage of God.

== Guto and Llywelyn ==
Llywelyn was, as the poem makes clear, a man of action as well as a poet. Some of Llywelyn's own poems deal with his exploits in the field of banditry, and it seems likely that Guto, himself a soldier, would have admired him as a daredevil. One of Guto's early poems shows close textual and thematic similarities to one of Llywelyn's, showing that he was familiar with the older man's work, and it has even been suggested that Guto had learned the art of poetry as a pupil of Llywelyn, or failing that of one of his admirers. Llywelyn addressed several poems to Guto. He was connected with the Cistercian monastery of Strata Marcella, perhaps living there as a "corrodiary" or pensioner of the abbey in his last years. Certainly, that was the scene of his death in January or February 1440, and the poem suggests that Guto was present. Extreme unction was given to him by one Father Griffri, whom Guto thanks in the poem. He was perhaps the monastery's abbot and may have commissioned Guto's poem, which can be presumed to have been written shortly after Llywelyn's death.

== Reception ==
The critic R. Iestyn Daniel wrote that it is "a profound and sincere elegy, but quieter and more meditative than that of Rhys Goch". Gwyn Williams considered it "as fine as any tribute to a dead poet"; it was for him a poem which gave new life to the standard tropes of elegy, displaying a mastery of cynghanedd (the strict alliteration required in the classical Welsh metres) such that the effect of many lines stems quite as much from their musicality as their meaning. Thomas Parry thought highly enough of it to include it in his Oxford Book of Welsh Verse.

== Manuscripts ==
22 manuscripts of the poem are known. The earliest dates from c. 1560 and the latest from the 19th century; six or seven were copied in the second half of the 16th century. All the manuscripts are associated with north or central Wales. Textual differences are not great and can in part be attributed to oral transmission.

== Modern editions ==
- Williams, John Llywelyn; Williams, Ifor, eds. (1961). Gwaith Guto'r Glyn (2nd ed.). Caerdydd: Gwasg Prifysgol Cymru. pp. 14–16.
- Parry, Thomas, ed. (1962). The Oxford Book of Welsh Verse. Oxford: Clarendon Press. pp. 132–134.
- Daniel, R. Iestyn (2013). "82 – Marwnad Llywelyn ab y Moel". Guto'r Glyn.net. Aberystwyth: Canolfan Uwchefrydiau Cymreig a Cheltaidd, Prifysgol Cymru.

== Translations ==
- Clancy, Joseph P. (1965). Medieval Welsh Lyrics. London: Macmillan. pp. 209–211.
  - Revised version in Clancy, Joseph P. (2003). Medieval Welsh Poems. Dublin: Four Courts Press. pp. 313–314. ISBN 9781851826964.
- Daniel, R. Iestyn (2013). "82 – Marwnad Llywelyn ab y Moel". Guto'r Glyn.net. Aberystwyth: Canolfan Uwchefrydiau Cymreig a Cheltaidd, Prifysgol Cymru.
- Loomis, Richard in Loomis, Richard; Johnston, Dafydd (1992). Medieval Welsh Poems: An Anthology. Binghamton: Medieval & Renaissance Texts & Studies. pp. 148–151. ISBN 0866981020.
- Williams, Gwyn (1976). To Look for a Word. Llandysul: Gomer Press. pp. 83–85. ISBN 0850883563.
