= St Mary's Church, Beddgelert =

Saint Mary's, Beddgelert
- The Priory and Parish Church of Saint Mary (Beddgelert)
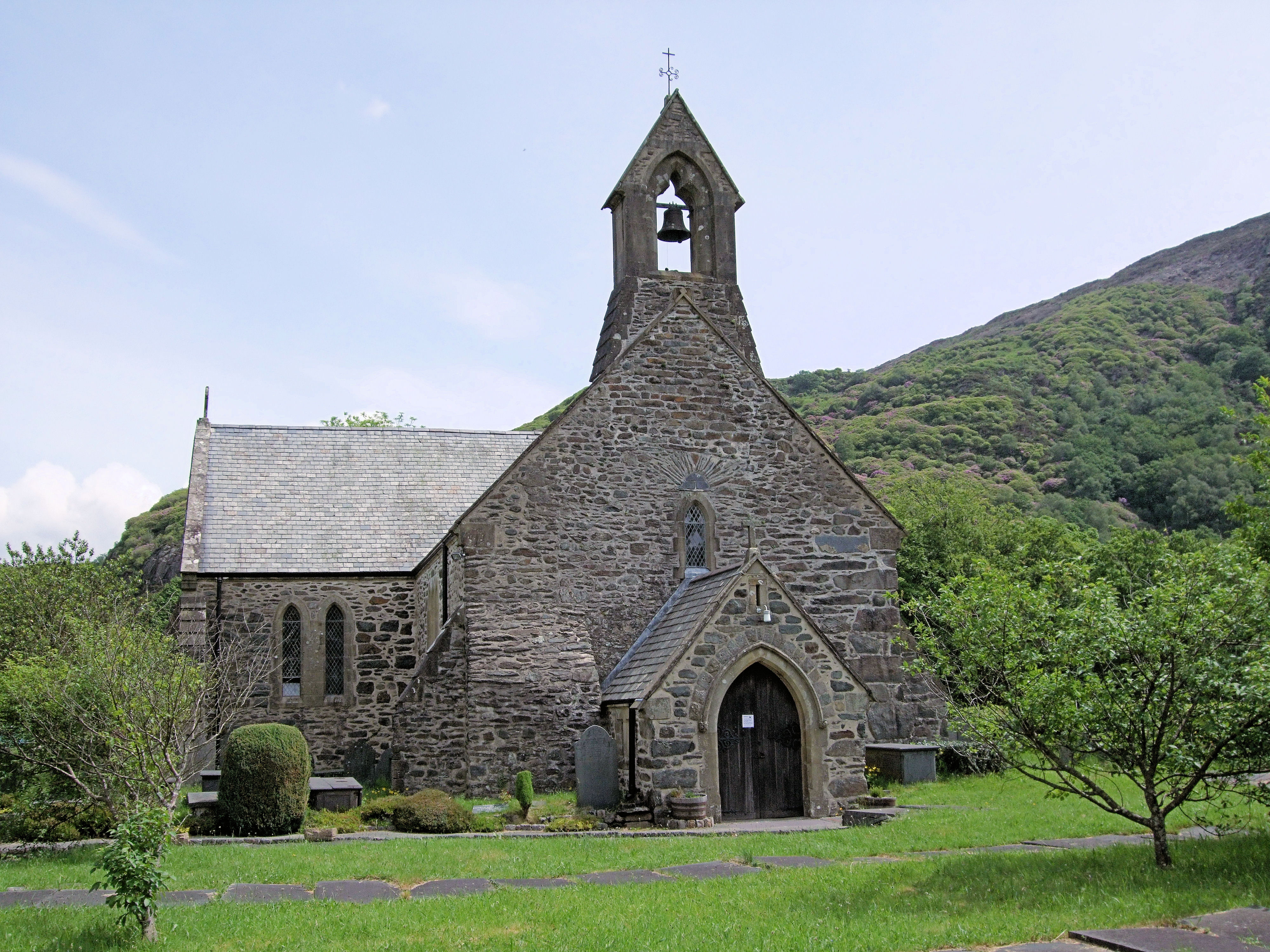
- Saint Mary's, Beddgelert
- 53°00′40″N 4°06′06″W
- Location: Beddgelert
- Country: Wales
- Denomination: Anglican
- Previous denomination: Roman Catholic

Administration
- Province: Wales

The Priory and Parish Church of Saint Mary is in Beddgelert, in the Snowdonia area of Gwynedd, Wales. It is a Grade II* listed building, on the site of one of the oldest Christian establishments in Wales. An early Christian community was established there in the 6th century AD which is mentioned by Gerald of Wales. An Augustinian priory was founded there in the 13th century, and in the Middle Ages it grew substantially thanks to the support of important Welsh nobles including Prince Llewelyn.

The priory and many of its records were destroyed in 1283 or 1284 by a fire. As of the early 16th century it was Sir John Wynn (ancestor of the Barons Newborough) who owned the priory in addition to Bardsey Island. In the 16th century, as part of the dissolution of the monasteries, the priory was closed in October 1535 and became a simple parish church. It is still in use in this capacity, with most services being bilingual.

Remnants of the church's medieval past include transept arches and some of the stonework around the lancet windows. The Victorian era brought further modifications including the demolition of the north aisle and some new stained glass. The existing glass is dated only to the 19th and 20th centuries and includes work by Dunstan Powell (1920) and Trena Cox (1968).

In May 2026, the church was voted by Reddit users as "the best place on Earth" after 29 rounds. Reverend Kim Williams expressed surprise at the result, stating, "I might be biased saying this, but it definitely deserved to win".

== People ==
- The church is associated with Saint Gelert or Celer, who may have been the founder of the original church.
- The harpist and wrestler Marged ferch Ifan (1696-1793) was baptised here in 1696 and married in 1717.
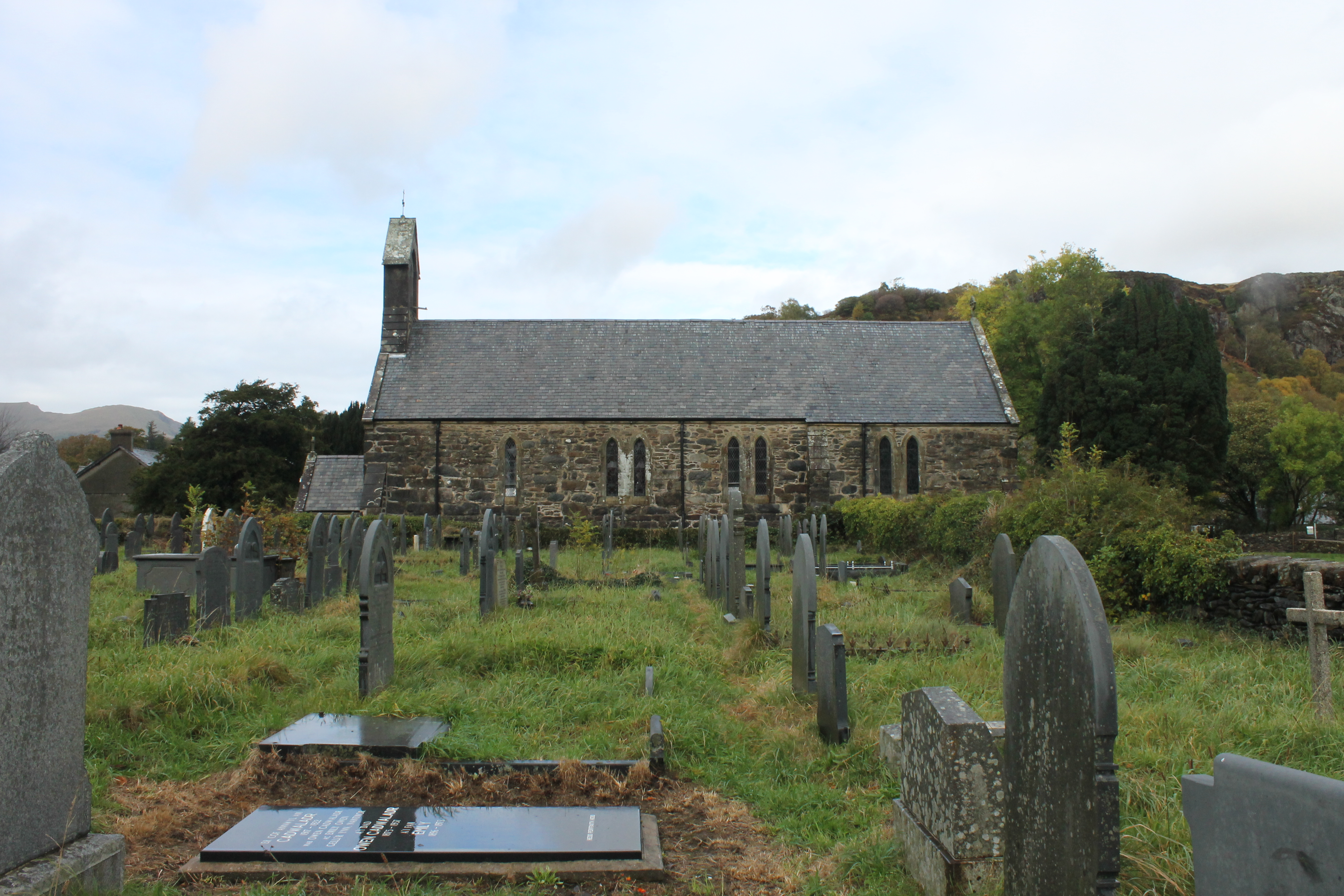

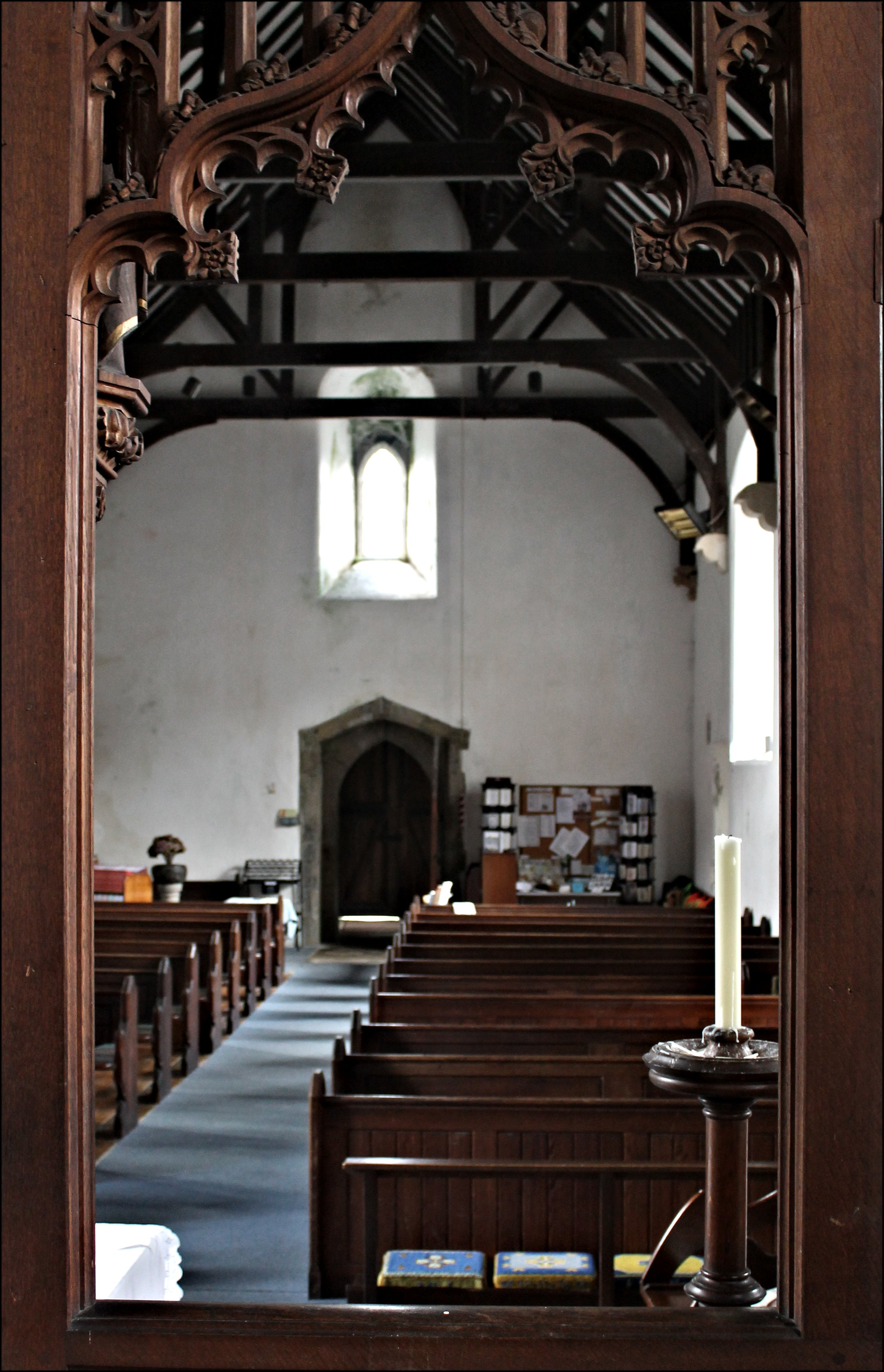

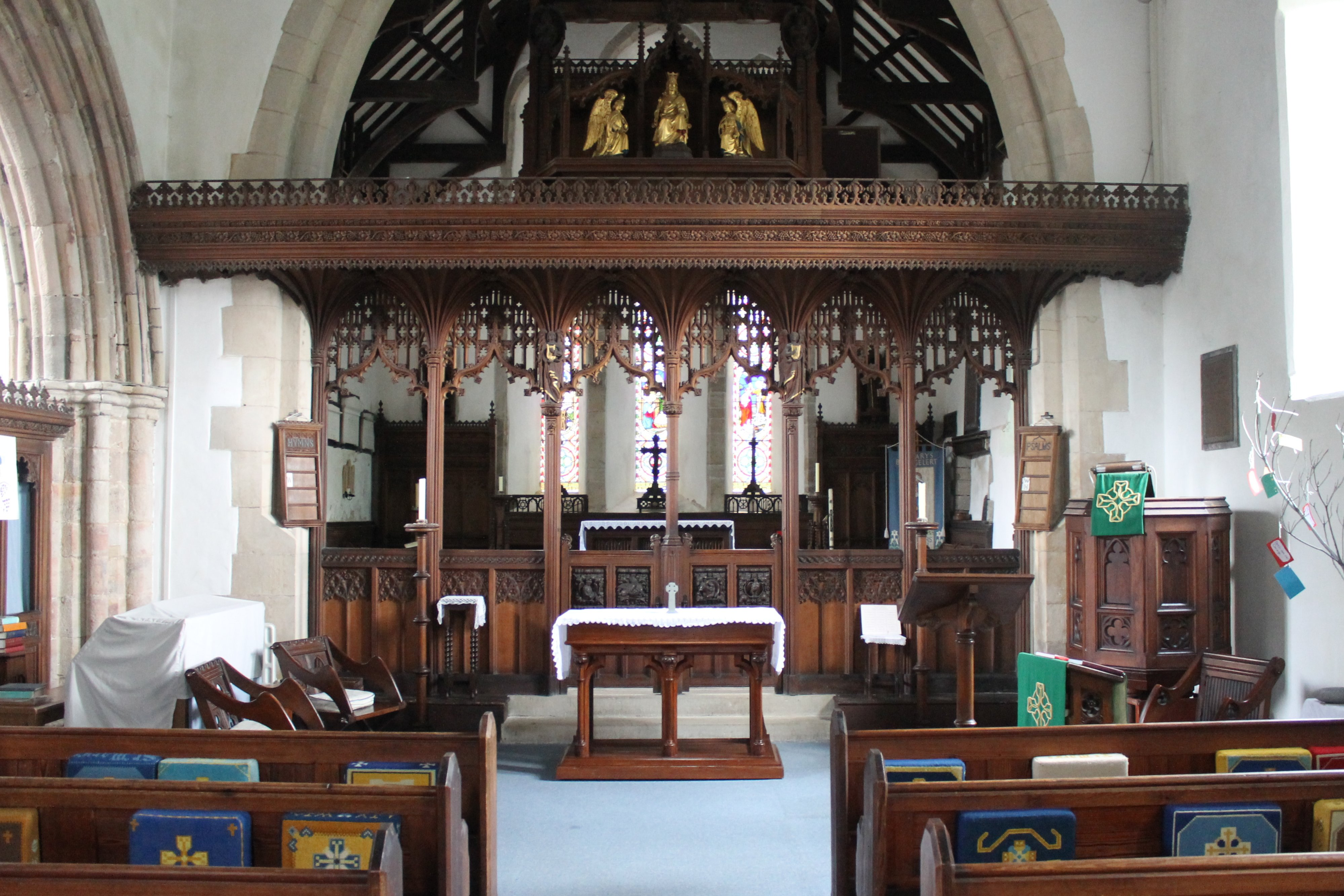

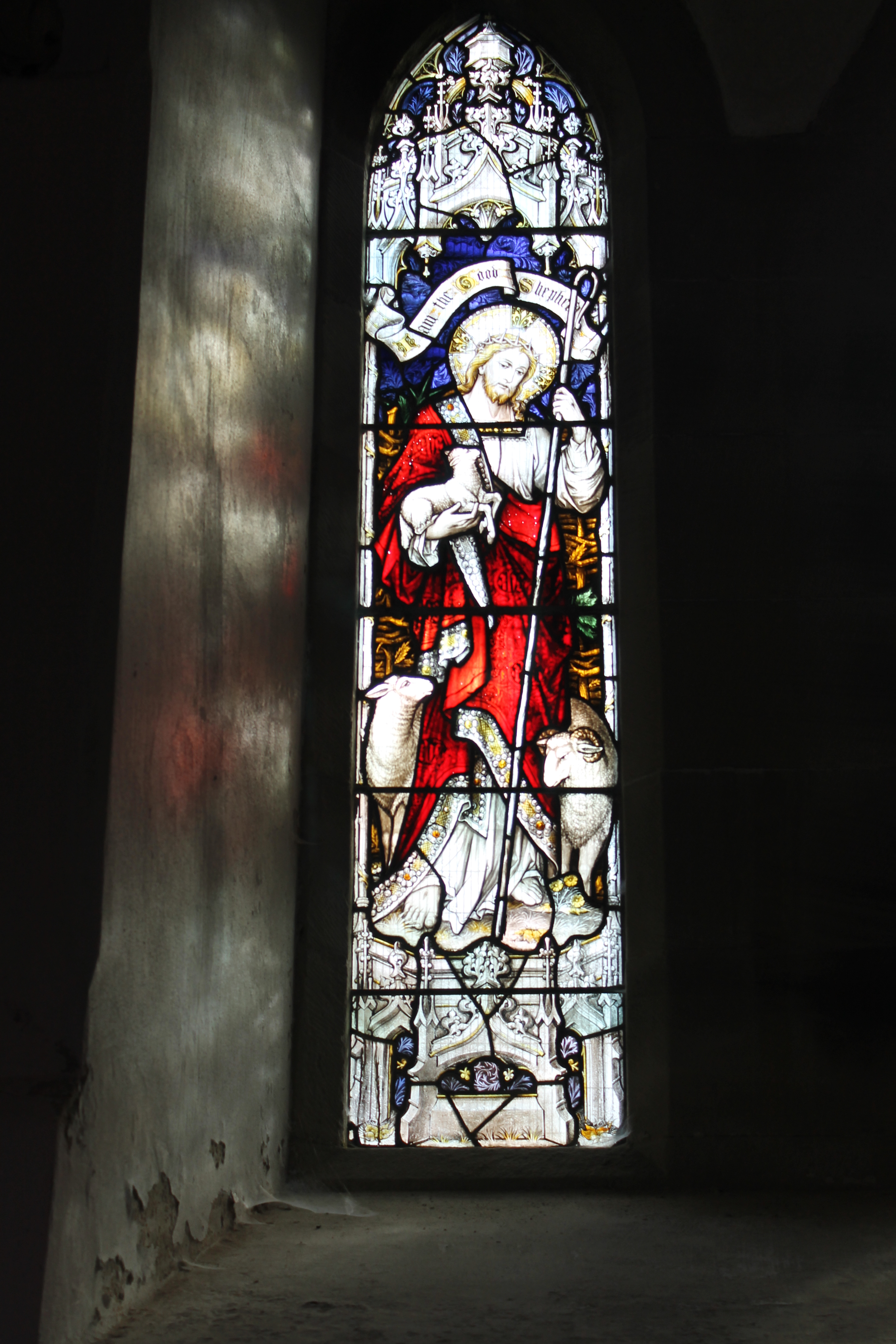
