= Llywelyn ab y Moel =

15th-century Welsh poet and rebel

- Died: 1440
- Resting place: Strata Marcella
- Partner: Euron
- Children: Owain ap Llywelyn ab y Moel
- Parents: Moel y Pantri; Lleucu

Llywelyn ab y Moel (died 1440) was a Welsh-language poet and rebel, and father of the poet Owain ap Llywelyn ab y Moel.

== Life ==
Llywelyn was raised in Llanwnnog, a village in Arwystli, Powys. He was also connected through his maternal relatives to the parish of Meifod.

He fought in the revolt of Owain Glyndŵr, and then lived as a rebel outlaw. His poetry contains attacks on the English, and descriptions of life as an outlaw. However, after the failure of Glyndŵr's rebellion, Llywelyn appears to have changed his allegiance; Sir William ap Thomas is later attested as his patron.

Later in his life, Llywelyn became religious, and was ultimately buried at Strata Marcella.

== Works ==
In his early career, Llywelyn studied under a poet named Rhys ap Dafydd ab Iorwerth.

Llywelyn is noted for his bardic debate between himself and Rhys Goch Eryri on the nature and origin of the poetic muse, or awen. He also wrote many poems addressed to Guto'r Glyn, who in return wrote an elegy to his memory.
