= Stephen of Bourbon =

French historian and Catholic priest

- Born: 1180; Belleville, Archdiocese of Lyon, France
- Died: 1261 (aged 80–81)
- Occupations: Preacher, writer, historian, inquisitor

Stephen of Bourbon (French: Étienne de Bourbon; Latin: Stephanus de Borbone; 1180 – 1261) was a preacher of the Dominican Order, author of the largest collection of preaching exempla of the thirteenth century, a historian of medieval heresies, and one of the first inquisitors.

Stephen was born in Belleville in the Archdiocese of Lyon towards the end of the twelfth century. Having received his education from the cathedral clergy in Macon, he undertook his higher studies in Paris, about 1220, and shortly afterwards entered the Order of Preachers. From 1230 he was very active for many years as a preacher and inquisitor in the districts of Lyonnais, Burgundy, Franche-Comté, Savoy, Champagne, Lorraine, Auvergne, Languedoc, and Roussillon.

His work for preachers, Tractatus de diversis materiis praedicabilibus ("A Treatise on Various Preachable Materials"), includes material drawn from his many years of practical experience, as well as a number of stories from the First Crusade chanson de geste tradition. The work was written some time between 1250 and his death in 1261 as a "manual for his brethren presenting authorities, arguments and exempla from which to construct sermons on any given subject." It sought to promote the Christian life amongst the "simple" among the faithful, using arguments reinforced by authority and illuminating them by means of exempla (moral examples and anecdotes). The work was also known as De septem donis Spiritus Sancti ('On the Seven Gifts of the Holy Spirit'), as the text is constructed around a scheme of these seven gifts, although Stephen had only reached the fifth gift before he died, leaving the work incomplete. A free use of Stephen's writings was made by a later medieval compiler to form a Speculum morale, for a long time falsely attributed to Vincent of Beauvais.

Stephen was the protagonist of a 1987 French film Le Moine et la Sorcière, by Suzanne Schiffman, in which he was played by Tchéky Karyo.

== Printed editions ==
- Stephani de Borbone, Tractatus de diversis materiis predicabilibus. Prologus - Liber primus. De dono timoris, ed. Jacques Berlioz et Jean-Luc Eichenlaub (Corpus Christianorum. Continuatio Mediaevalis, 124), Turnhout, Brepols publishers, 2002 (ISBN 978-2-503-04241-1)
- Stephani de Borbone, Tractatus de diversis materiis predicabilibus. Liber secundus. De dono pietatis, ed. Jacques Berlioz (Corpus Christianorum. Continuatio Mediaevalis, 124A), Turnhout, Brepols publishers, 2015 (ISBN 978-2-503-55258-3)
- Stephani de Borbone, Tractatus de diversis materiis predicabilibus. Liber tertius. De eis que pertinent ad donum scientie et penitentiam, ed. Jacques Berlioz (Corpus Christianorum. Continuatio Mediaevalis, 124B), Turnhout, Brepols publishers, 2006 (ISBN 978-2-503-04245-9)
- Étienne de Bourbon, Anecdotes historiques, légendes et apologues tirés du recueil inédit d’Étienne de Bourbon dominicain du XIII^{e} siècle, édition de Albert Lecoy de la Marche, Paris, Henri Loones, 1877. Available online via Gallica.

== See also ==
- Saint Guinefort
