= Alan Burgess =

English writer (1915–1998)

- Born: 1 February 1915; Birmingham, England
- Died: 10 April 1998 (aged 83); England
- Occupation: Author

Alan Burgess (1 February 1915 – 10 April 1998) was an English Royal Air Force pilot and author who wrote several biographical and non-fiction books between the 1950s and the 1970s. He wrote biographies of Gladys Aylward, and Flora Sandes, and co-wrote Ingrid Bergman's autobiography. Bergman played Gladys Aylward in the film The Inn of the Sixth Happiness based on Burgess's biography.

Having served in the Royal Air Force during World War II, Burgess went on to write The Longest Tunnel: The True Story of World War II's Great Escape, the story of "The Great Escape".

== Works ==
=== Novels ===
- Alan Burgess (1968). The Word for Love. Dutton.

=== Non-fiction ===
Biographies

- Alan Burgess (1957). The Inn of the Sixth Happiness.
- Alan Burgess (1959). The Small Woman: The Heroic Story of Gladys Aylward. Reprint Society. ISBN 9780330101967.
- Alan Burgess (1963). The Lovely Sergeant. Readers Book Club.
- Alan Burgess (1975). Daylight Must Come: The Story of a Courageous Woman Doctor in the Congo. G. K. Hall. ISBN 978-0-8161-6281-9.
- Ingrid Bergman; Alan Burgess (1980). Ingrid Bergman: My Story. Delacorte Press. ISBN 978-0-4400-3299-1.
- Kay Sandiford, Alan Burgess (1984). Shattered Night. ISBN 9780446512596.

History

- Alan Burgess (1960). Seven Men at Daybreak. Evans Bros.
- Alan Burgess (1990). The Longest Tunnel: The True Story of World War II's Great Escape. Naval Institute Press. ISBN 978-1-59114-097-9.

== Adaptations ==
- The Inn of the Sixth Happiness (1958), film directed by Mark Robson, based on book The Inn of the Sixth Happiness
- Operation Daybreak (1975), film directed by Lewis Gilbert, based on book Seven Men at Daybreak
