= Place of Stones =

1961 memoir of Welsh farm life

- Author: Ruth Janette Ruck
- Genre: Back-to-the-land memoir
- Publisher: Faber and Faber
- Publication date: 1961

Place of Stones is a 1961 memoir by Ruth Janette Ruck (1928–2006) about living on a farm in Snowdonia, Wales. Place of Stones was followed by sequels Hill Farm Story and Along Came a Llama. Place of Stones remained in print until at least 1992.

Place of Stones is set not far from the location of Thomas Firbank's I Bought a Mountain and has been compared to Elizabeth West's Hovel in the Hills.

Ruck lived on Carneddi (place of stones or cairns), a farm that includes the 1529 hall-house Tŷ-Mawr. Carneddi is located above Traeth Gwylit (Menai Strait) on Moel y Dyniewyd. Ruck was 17 years old when she first came to the farm. Some of the improvements she made were funded by the Act of 1946 supporting hill farmers. Ruck also wrote about her participation in the on-location filming of Inn of the Sixth Happiness, which was partially shot in Wales.

The Guardian described Place of Stones as "delightful."
