= Beddgelert =

Village and community in Gwynedd, Wales

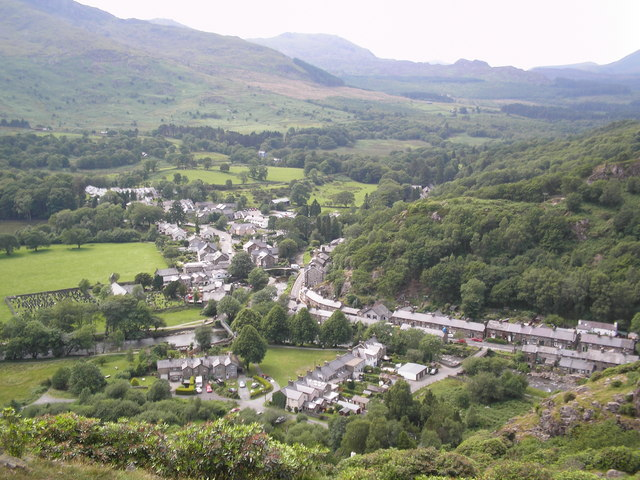
- The village viewed from Mynydd Sygun

- Location within Gwynedd
- Area: 85.93 km^{2} (33.18 sq mi)
- Population: 460 (2021 census)
  - Density: 5/km^{2} (13/sq mi)
- OS grid reference: SH591482
- Community: Beddgelert
- Principal area: Gwynedd
- Country: Wales
- Sovereign state: United Kingdom
- Post town: CAERNARFON
- Postcode district: LL55
- Dialling code: 01766
- Police: North Wales
- Fire: North Wales
- Ambulance: Welsh
- UK Parliament: Dwyfor Meirionnydd
- Senedd Cymru – Welsh Parliament: Gwynedd Maldwyn
- List of places UK Wales Gwynedd 53.011°N 4.102°W Map of the community

Beddgelert (Welsh: [bɛðˈgɛlɛrt]) is a village and community in the Snowdonia area of Gwynedd, Wales. Its population at the 2021 census was 460, which includes Nantmor and Nant Gwynant. Despite the village being reputedly named after the legendary hound Gelert, it is actually named after Saint Gelert, an early leader in Celtic Christianity. The community is large and sparsely populated, covering 33 mi^{2} (86 km^{2}).

== History ==
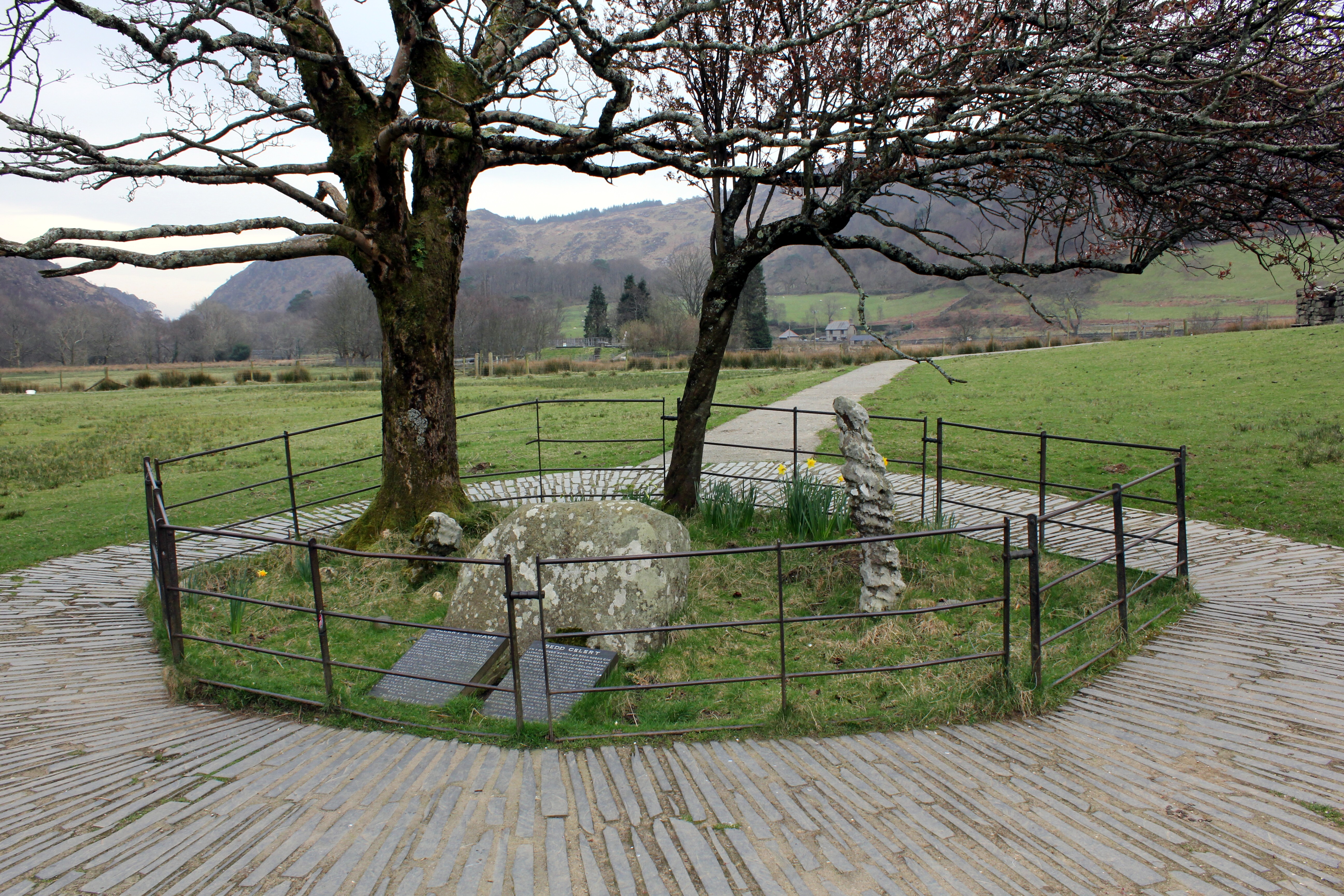
Gelert's Grave

The folk tale of the faithful hound Gelert is often associated with the village, but the raised mound in the village called Gelert's Grave was built by David Pritchard, a late 18th-century landlord of the Goat Hotel. He created it in order to encourage visitors and it still remains popular attraction. Similar legends can be found in other parts of Europe and Asia.

The village is actually named after an early Celtic Christian missionary and leader named Saint Gelert (Celert or Cilert), who settled here early in the eighth century. The earliest record of the name Beddgelert is in a 1258 document, where it is recorded as Bekelert. In a document of 1269, it is recorded as Bedkelerd. The current name of the village is often rendered "Begél" in the local Welsh dialect.

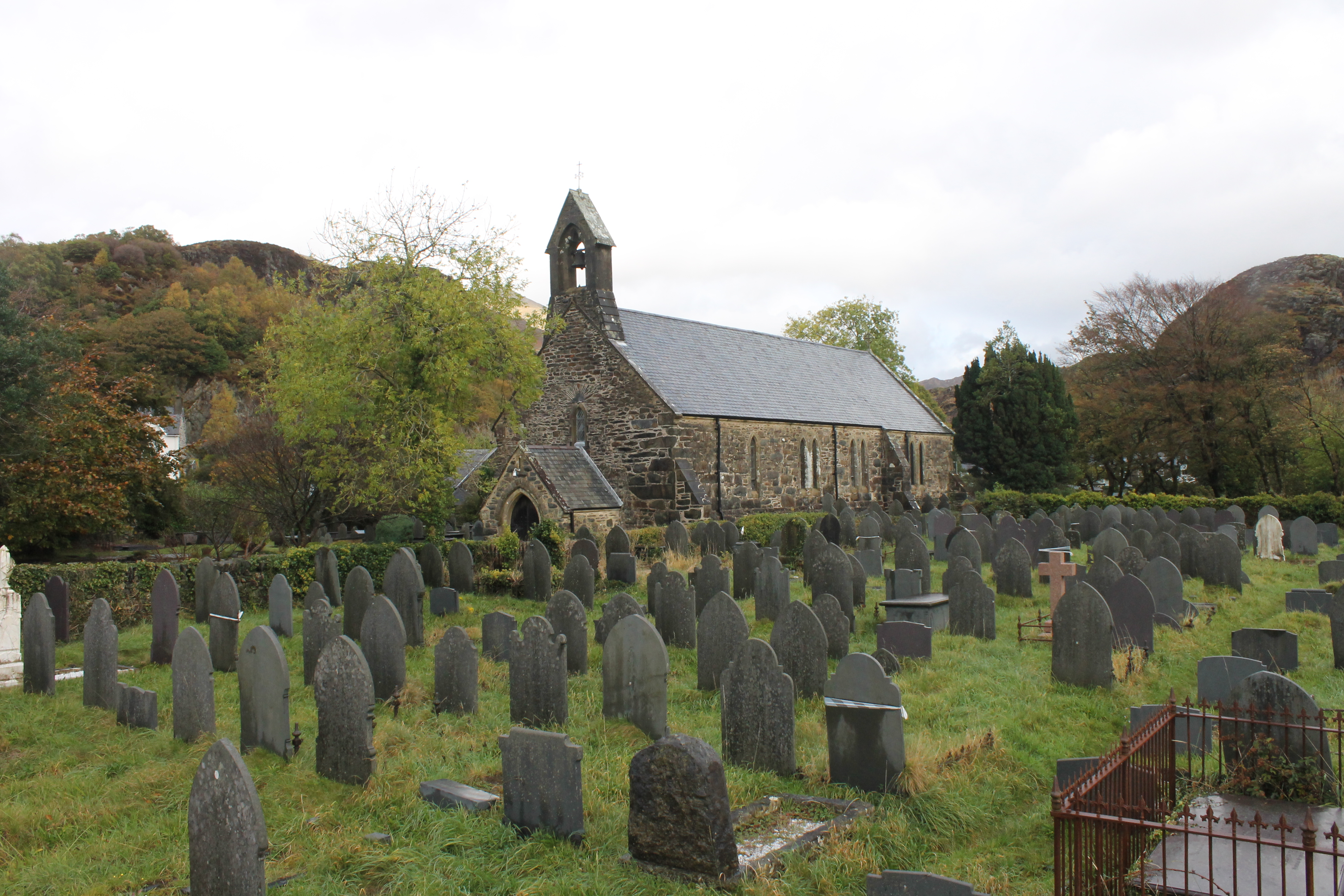
St Mary's Church

St Mary's Church stands at the end of Stryd yr Eglwys (Church Street). This was originally a part of an Augustinian Monastery, but the chapel is all that remains since the rest of the monastery was burned down during Edward I's war of conquest. Rebuilding was probably not completed at the time of the suppression of the monastery in about 1536. Parts of the building date from the 12th century and are still in active use today.

== Geography ==
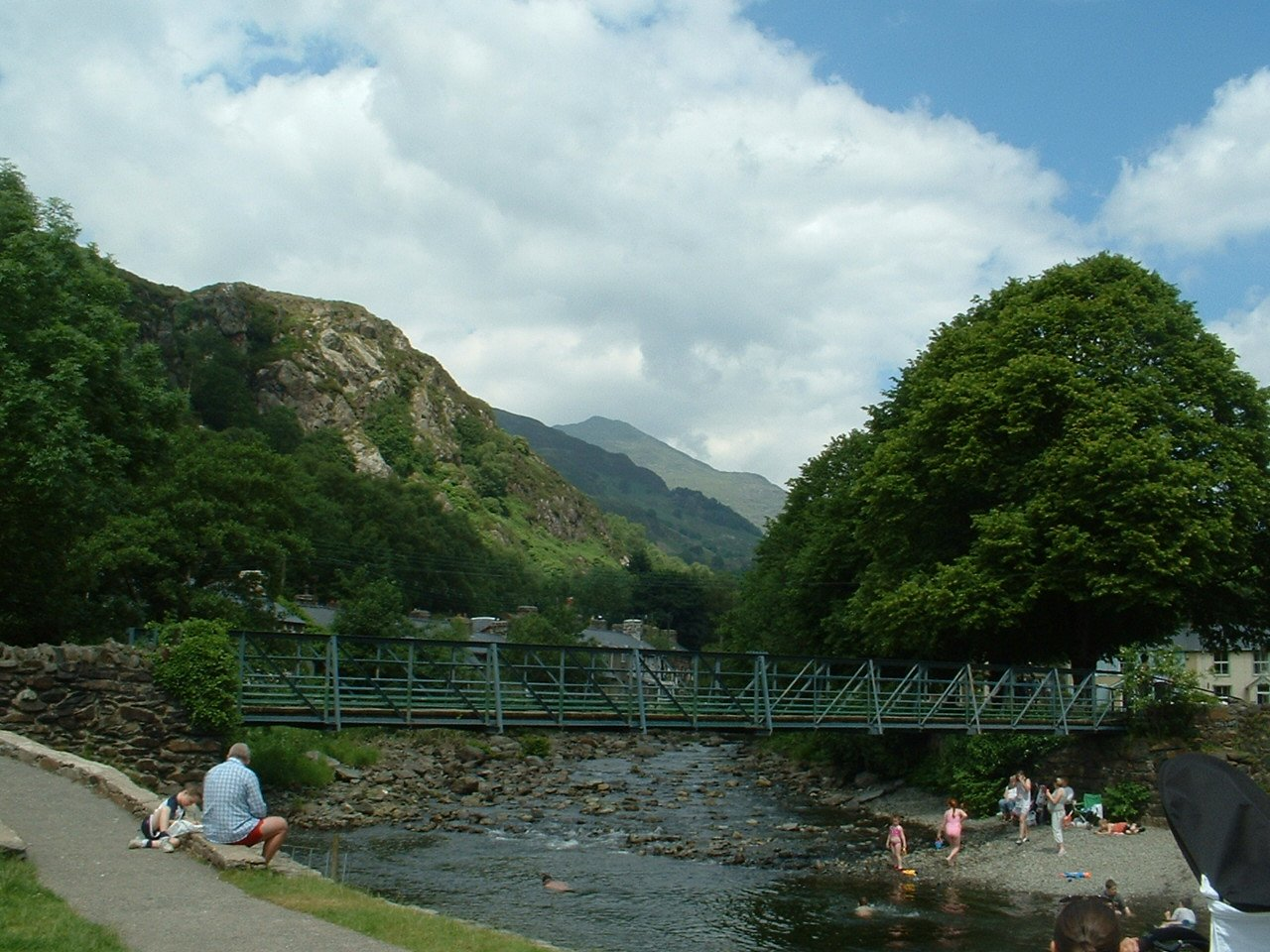
The river Glaslyn

The village stands in a valley at the confluence of the river Glaslyn and the Afon Colwyn. Just above the confluence of the rivers, in the centre of the village, is an old stone bridge with two arches. Many of the houses and hotels are built of local dark stone. To the west is Moel Hebog and to the north and a series of hills rising to the Snowdon horseshoe.

It lies next to Afon Colwyn just upstream of its confluence with the Afon Glaslyn. It is also the nearest village to the scenic Glaslyn gorge, an area of tumultuous river running between steep wooded hills. Much of the area is, however, becoming invaded by the alien plant, Rhododendron ponticum which provides a covering of pink blossom in May and June; it is slowly blanketing out the native flora. Attempts have been made to control its spread by cutting and burning.

River levels on the Glaslyn in Beddgelert are constantly monitored by the Natural Resources Wales, in order to give advance warning of flood conditions lower down the valley.

=== Demographics ===
In 2021, the population of Beddgelert was recorded as 460, 34.5% of which were aged 55 to 74, higher than the national average of 25.1%. The largest ethnic group is White, making up 97.2% of the population, higher than the national average of 93.8%, with the second largest being Mixed with 2.2% of the population, higher than the national average of 1.6%.

The largest religious group in Beddgelert is No religion with 46.5% of the population, which is also the national average, with the second largest being Christianity with 42.6%, lower than the national average of 43.6%.

== Economy ==
Beddgelert is a significant tourist attraction; its picturesque bridge crosses the Afon Colwyn. It has a range of hotels with public bars, guesthouses, cafes and restaurants. The car park in the village provides the easiest access route for climbing Moel Hebog, the mountain which directly overlooks the village.

The outdoor equipment company Gelert originated in Bryncir; it then moved its headquarters to Beddgelert and later on to nearby Porthmadog.

Other local attractions include the Sygun Copper Mine.

The village is also linked with the Rupert Bear stories, as Alfred Bestall wrote and illustrated some of the stories whilst he lived in the village, in a cottage at the foot of Mynydd Sygun. There is even a small area known as "Rupert Garden" in the village, dedicated to the bear; a short walk from Alfred Bestall's old home.

== Transport ==
Part of the heritage Welsh Highland Railway runs through the village. In April 2009, Beddgelert station reopened to the public. The line links the village with Caernarfon to the north and Porthmadog Harbour to the south.

Bus routes are operated by Gwynfor Coaches, which connect the town with Bangor, Caernarfon, Dinorwig, Pen-y-Pass, Porthmadog and Tremadog.

The A4085 between Caernarfon (13 mi or 21 km north) and Porthmadog (8 mi or 13 km south) runs through the village.

== Beddgelert meteorite ==
On 21 September 1949, a meteorite struck the Prince Llewelyn Hotel in the early hours of the morning, causing damage to the roof and a bedroom in the hotel. The following week the Caernarvon & Denbigh Herald reported the incident:

"STRANGE HAPPENING.- About 3 a.m. on the morning of September 21st, a piece of metal weighing about 5 pounds fell through the roof of Prince Llewelyn Hotel to a bedroom below. The noise was heard throughout the village and no explanation has been forthcoming for the mysterious happening."

The proprietor of the hotel, a Mr Tillotson, subsequently sold half the meteorite to the British Museum and half to Durham University, which had placed an advertisement in the local papers asking for information and offering a reward for any recovered fragments of the meteorite.

There have only ever been two such verified meteorite falls in Wales: the Beddgelert incident and another 14 mi (23 km) away in Pontllyfni in 1931, at the other end of the Nantlle Ridge.

== In popular culture ==
Many films have made use of the scenery around Beddgelert:

- The Inn of the Sixth Happiness, starring Ingrid Bergman
- Lara Croft: Tomb Raider – The Cradle of Life, starring Angelina Jolie, were also shot here.
- The area was also used to double for the Khyber Pass in India for the film Carry On Up the Khyber in 1968. The cast and crew stayed at the Royal Goat Hotel in Beddgelert during filming.

== Notable people ==
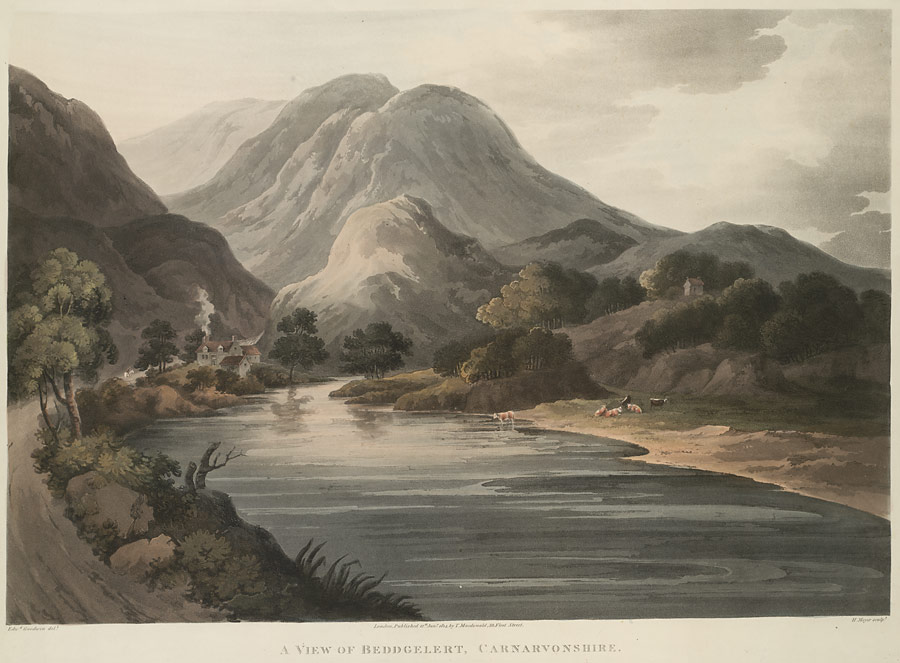
Beddgelert, c. 1814

- Renowned bards who lived in the area in the 15th–16th centuries include Rhys Goch Eryri (fl.1385–1448), Dafydd Nanmor (fl.1450–1490) and Rhys Nanmor (fl.1480–1513). More recently, from the 19th to the 20th centuries, both Glasynys (Owen Wynne Jones) and Carneddog (Richard Griffith) lived in Nantmor. Currently Nantmor is still home to poets, including Nia Powell and Cynan Jones.
- John Williams (c. 1584 – c. 1627), goldsmith who worked for King James I, was from Beddgelert, and donated a silver cup to the church in 1610.
- Marged ferch Ifan (1696–1793), Welsh harpist and wrestler, was born here.
- Alfred Bestall (1892–1986), one of the illustrators and storytellers of the comic strip character Rupert Bear, lived in the village for many years.
