= Rhys Nanmor =

Rhys Nanmor (fl. 1480–1513) was a Welsh language poet who lived in Nanmor, near Beddgelert in North Wales.

Among his surviving work is a prophecy to King Henry VII of England and an elegy on the death of Arthur, Prince of Wales, who died in 1502.

Rhys was a family poet of Sir Rhys ap Thomas, and is thought to have been the bardic pupil of Dafydd Nanmor.
