= Saint Gelert =

Celtic saint

Gelert / Celer
- Born: 7th century Wales
- Venerated in: Roman Catholic Church; Anglican Church
- Major shrine: Chapel of St Celer
- Feast: June 29

Saint Gelert, also known as Celer, Celert, or Kellarth, was an early Celtic saint. Several locations in Wales are believed to bear his name. They include Beddgelert ("Gelert's grave") and the surrounding Gelert Valley and Llangeler ("Gelert's church"), where there is a church dedicated to him. Through the promotional efforts of an innkeeper in the early 1790s, St. Gelert, the human, has become much conflated with the legend of a saintly dog putatively from the same region, Gelert.

== Name ==
The name "Gelert" is a cymricized variant of Celert or Cilert (also written Cylart, Kelert, Kilart, or Kylart) and Kellarth (also written Kelarth or Kełłarth). It is also spelled Geler or Celer, although this probably represents a misunderstanding of Celtic alveolar plosives and dental fricatives, and is sometimes even teutonized to Killhart, Kilhart, or Gellert. It is of unknown meaning or origin.

== Life ==
Gelert was a hermit in the late 7th century who lived in a cave near what is now known as the Holy Well of St Celer near Llandysul. In the Dark Ages, pilgrims would travel to the well for healing by Gelert. Eventually a chapel dedicated to St Mary (called "Capel Mair") was erected over the well, of which the ruins still remain. It is believed that Gelert was at some time a missionary, evangelizing in Llangeler and Beddgelert. According to modern historical belief, he was martyred in Beddgelert, although this is a misconception simply based on the town name's meaning ("Gelert's grave"). It is believed, however, that Gelert was martyred.

== Conflation ==
Local Welsh legend more often identifies Gelert as a dog rather than a human. Unlike the dog-saint St. Guinefort, who was possibly an actual dog 'sainted' via folk belief for his reputed protection of children, St. Gelert was a man whose human identity has been overshadowed by hucksterism about a mythical martyred dog. According to folklore promoted by an innkeeper in Beddgelert, Gelert the dog was an Irish Wolfhound unjustly killed by his owner, Prince Llywelyn the Great, when found with bloody maws near the empty cradle of Llywelyn's son. When the scene was investigated, the body of a wolf was found, which the dog Gelert had killed to save the baby's life.

One modern writer offers this concise explanation of Beddgelert's connection to the "obscure, early-medieval, local saint":

The Welsh dog-hero/saint Gelert, associated with Prince Llywelyn the Great (1173–1240), is, however, a romantic fiction of the late 18th century derived from a 5th century Indian Buddhist work, the Pancha Tantra. The story gained wide currency in Europe [and] the Middle East. The heraldic Rous Roll of the 15th century, for example, depicted the arms of Wales as a helmet on which stand a dog and a cradle. But it was finally applied specifically by a hotelier to the village of Beddgelert, named after an obscure, early-mediæval, local saint. To reinforce the story further, he erected a megalith, Gelert's Bed. The 'new' story became the subject of a poem by W.R. Spencer which Joseph Haydn set to music. Such is the stuff of nationalist legend — and this is one of the more benign examples.

The innkeeper who popularized the dog's story was David Pritchard, who came to the area either around 1793 or 1801, depending on the source. The poem by Spencer is widely available online. Haydn set the poem to the tune of the Welsh air Eryri Wen, which means 'white mountains', a reference to Snowdon. In the Panchatantra, which dates back to oral traditions prior to 300 B.C.E., the villain is a snake, and the role of the dog is filled by a mongoose. Aesop included a dog-and-snake version. An early Welsh version of the tale appears in the Mabinogion. Other cultures provide other substitutions; even Disney added a non-fatal version of the legend to Lady and the Tramp.

== See also ==
- List of Catholic saints
