= Gelert =

Hound from Welsh legend

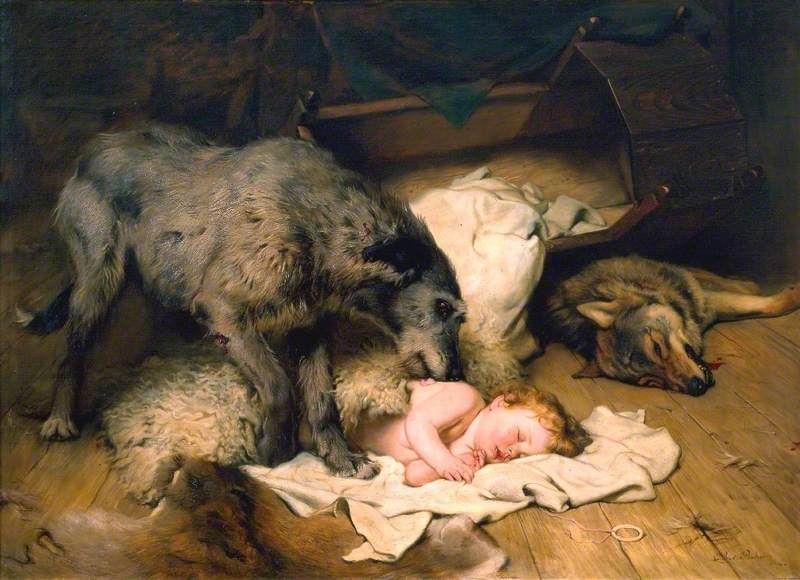
Gelert by Charles Burton Barber (1884)

Gelert (Welsh pronunciation: [ˈɡɛlɛrt]) is a legendary hound in a Welsh folk-tale. He is associated with the village of Beddgelert, in Gwynedd, North Wales, whose name translates to "Gelert's grave". A grave site does exist just south of the village, but it was created by the owner of a local hotel in the late 18th century to encourage tourism. Despite the similarity, the village was named for Saint Gelert, an early saint in Celtic Christianity.

== Legend ==
In the 12th or 13th century the Medieval Welsh ruler Llywelyn ab Iorwerth returns from hunting to find his baby missing, the cradle overturned, and Gelert with a blood-smeared mouth. Believing the dog had attacked the child, Llywelyn draws his sword and kills Gelert. After the dog's dying yelp, Llywelyn hears the cries of his baby, unharmed under the cradle, along with a dead wolf that had been killed by Gelert protecting the child. Llywelyn is overcome with remorse and buries the dog with great ceremony (which supposedly led to the town's name) but can still hear its dying yelp. After that day, Llywelyn never smiles again.

The story is a variation on the "Faithful Hound" folk-tale motif, which lives on as an urban legend. It is classified as Aarne–Thompson type 178A.

== Poems and other interpretations ==
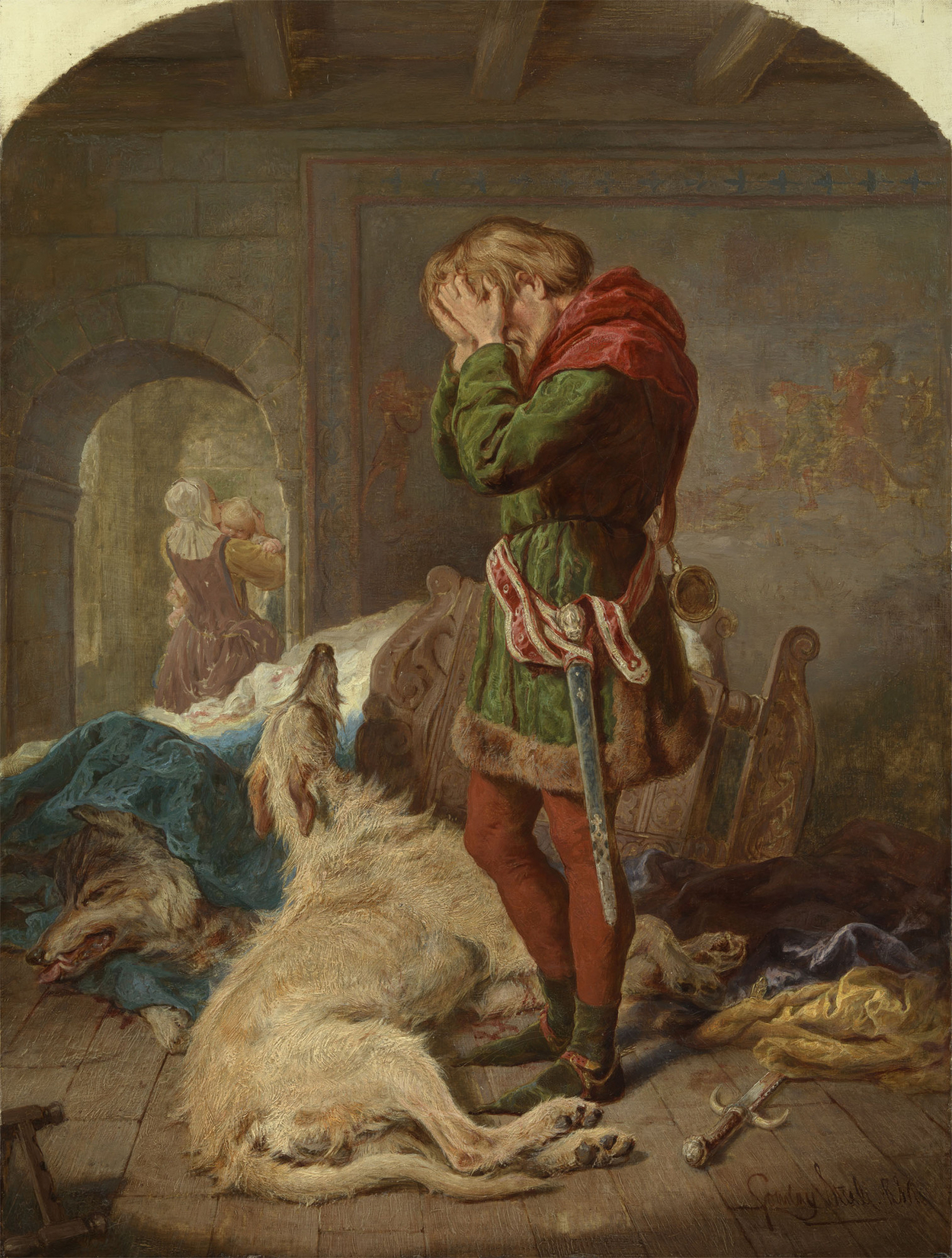
Llywelyn and His Brave Hound, Gelert by Gourlay Steell (1880)

This story formed the basis for several English poems, among which are "Beth Gêlert; or, the Grave of the Greyhound" by William Robert Spencer written around 1800; "Beth Gelert" by Richard Henry Horne; "Gelert" by Francis Orray Ticknor and the dramatic poem "Llewellyn" by Walter Richard Cassels. The tale is also alluded to by John Critchley Prince in lines 24 to 29 of his poem "North Wales:" "Thou hast not trod with pilgrim foot the ground / Where sleeps the canine martyr of distrust, / Poor Gelert, famed in song, as brave a hound / As ever guarded homestead, hut, or hall, / Or leapt exulting at the hunter’s call; / As ever grateful man consigned to dust." Despite this, and despite the presence of a raised mound in the village called Gelert's Grave, historians do not believe that Gelert ever existed.

It is recorded in Wild Wales (1862) by George Borrow, who notes it as a well known legend; by Brewer's Dictionary of Phrase and Fable, which details versions of the same story from other cultures; and by The Nuttall Encyclopaedia, under the Anglicised spellings "Gellert" and "Killhart". John Fiske discusses Gelert in his Myths and Myth-makers, saying regretfully that "as the Swiss must give up his Tell, so must the Welshman be deprived of his brave dog Gellert, over whose cruel fate I confess to having shed more tears than I should regard as well bestowed upon the misfortunes of many a human hero of romance." He notes that "to this day the visitor to Snowdon is told the touching story, and shown the place, called Beth-Gellert, where the dog's grave is still to be seen. Nevertheless, the story occurs in the fireside lore of nearly every Aryan people."

The tale indeed appears in numerous cultures with minor variations. The Alpine ligurian poem R sacrifisi dr can, written in Ligurian, tells of how a shepherd shot his sheepdog after finding it covered in sheep blood, only to later find a dead wolf in the stable.

In India, a black snake replaces the wolf and a mongoose replaces the dog. In Egypt, the story goes that a cook nearly killed a Wali for having smashed a pot of herbs, but later discovers that the pot contained a poisonous snake.

In Malaysian folklore, a similar story involves a tame bear, kept by a Malay hunter as the guardian of his young daughter. As in the story of Gelert, the hunter returns home from an expedition, and finds his daughter gone and the bear covered in blood. Hastily thinking the bear has devoured his daughter, the hunter kills it with his spear, but later finds the body of a tiger, killed by the bear in defence of the hunter's daughter, who shortly emerges from the jungle, from where she took refuge.

In the Disney movie Lady and the Tramp (1955), Tramp is carried off to the pound after Aunt Sarah finds him in a nursery with the cradle overturned. In this version of the tale, the "Gelert" figure is rescued: Lady manages to show "Jim Dear" the dead rat hidden behind a curtain, and the parents realize that Tramp actually saved their child from the rat.

London Children's Ballet produced ballet versions of the story at the Peacock Theatre in 1996 and 2002.

In 2002 the Incredible Story Studios made a short film called "The Return of Gelert", written by a Welsh schoolchild, which depicts the ghost of Gelert returning to haunt early 21st century Beddgelert.

== Gelert's grave ==
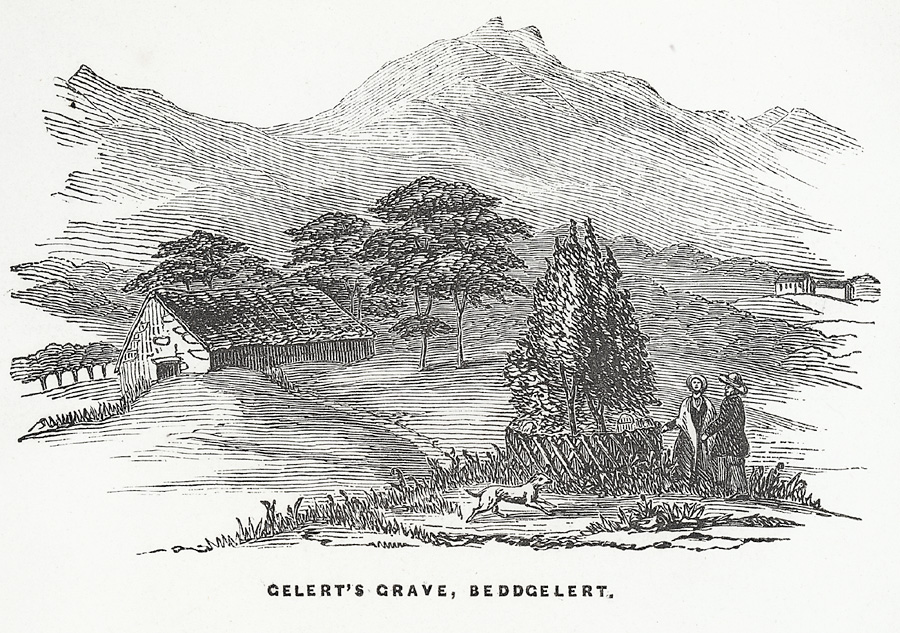
Gelert's Grave in 1850

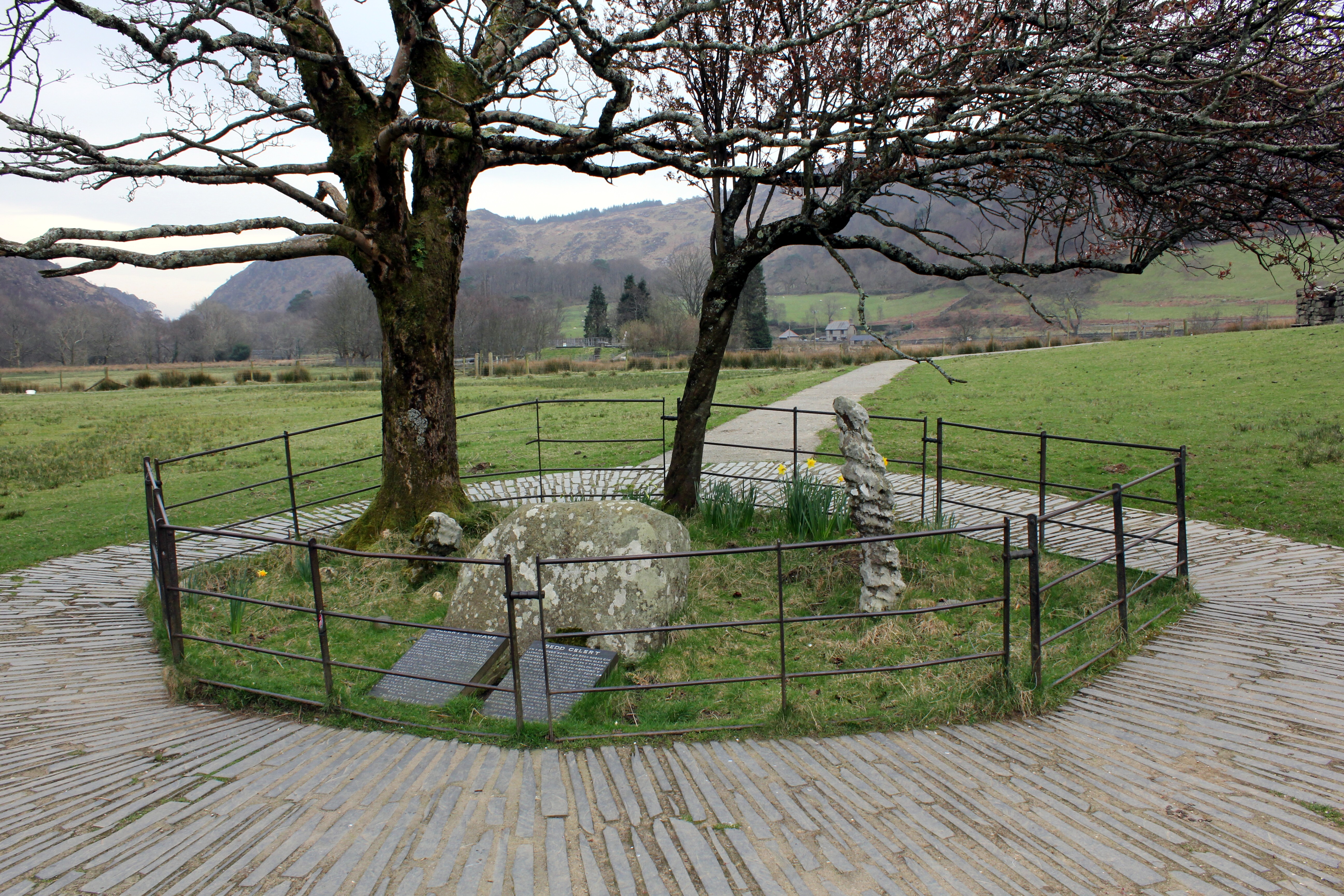
Gelert's Grave in 2012

It is now accepted that the village of Beddgelert took its name from an early saint named Kilart or Celert, rather than from the dog. The "grave" mound is ascribed to David Prichard, landlord of the Goat Hotel in Beddgelert in the late eighteenth century, who connected the legend to the village to encourage tourism.

On the supposed grave of Gelert there are two slate memorials, one in Welsh and the other in English. The latter reads:

Gelert's Grave

In the 13th century, Llywelyn, Prince of North Wales, had a palace at Beddgelert. One day he went hunting without Gelert "the faithful hound" who was unaccountably absent. On Llywelyn's return, the truant stained and smeared with blood, joyfully sprang to meet his master. The prince alarmed hastened to find his son, and saw the infant's cot empty, the bedclothes and floor covered with blood. The frantic father plunged the sword into the hound's side thinking it had killed his heir. The dog's dying yell was answered by a child's cry. Llywelyn searched and discovered his boy unharmed but near by lay the body of a mighty wolf which Gelert had slain, the prince filled with remorse is said never to have smiled again. He buried Gelert here. The spot is called Beddgelert.

== See also ==
- Jock of the Bushveld
- Saint Gelert
- Saint Guinefort
