= Marged ferch Ifan =

Welsh harpist and wrestler

- Born: 1696; Beddgelert
- Died: January 1793 (aged 96–97); Pen-llyn
- Other name: Margaret Evans

Marged ferch Ifan ("Margaret daughter of Ifan") or Marged uch Ifan; Marged vch Ifan or Margaret Evans (1696 – January 1793) was a Welsh harpist and wrestler, who was the subject of songs and tales that describe her fabled abilities.

== Life ==
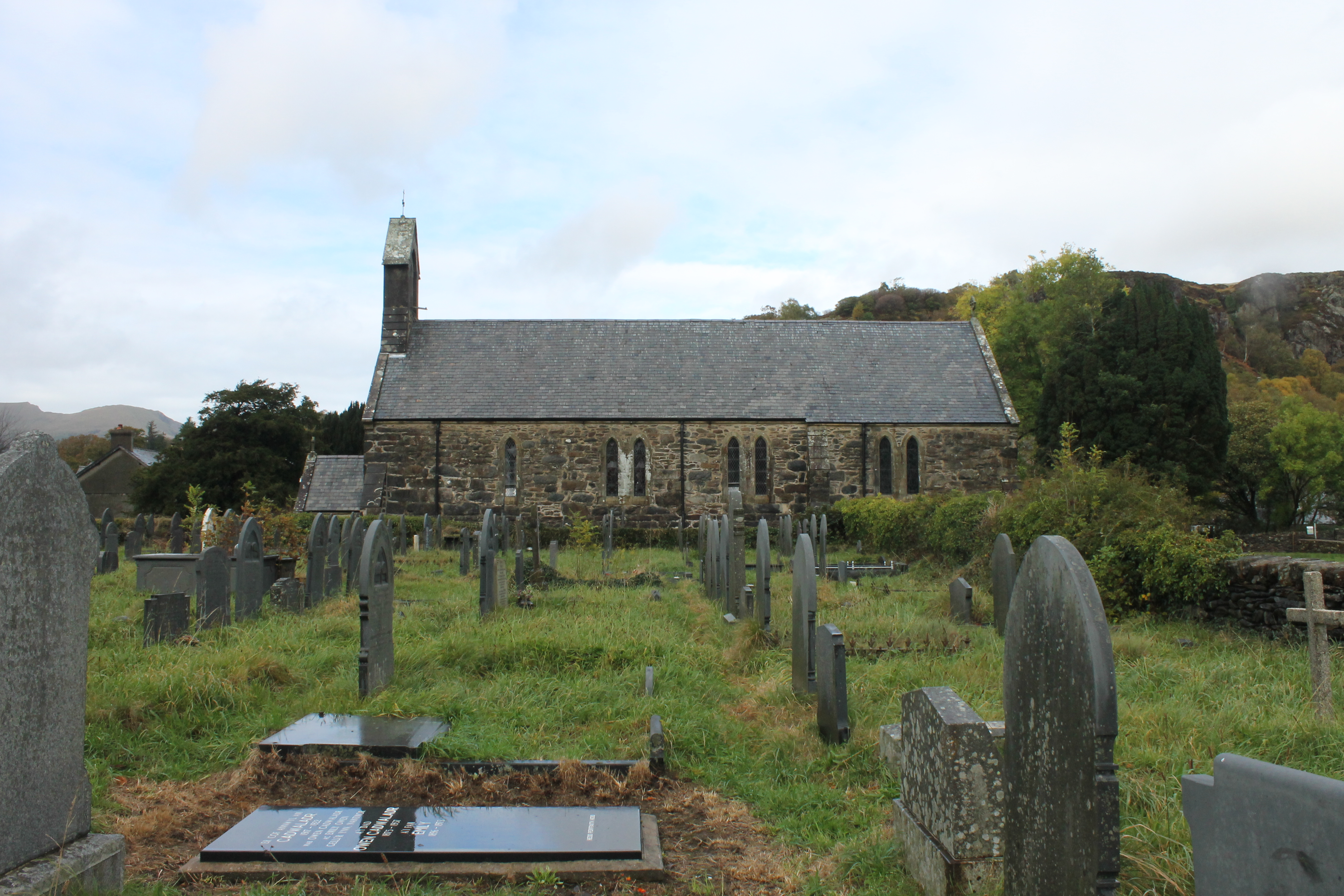
Marged ferch Ifan was baptised and married at St Mary's church in Beddgelert

Marged is thought to have been born in Beddgelert in mountainous Snowdonia as she was baptised at St Mary's Church in that village. She was the subject of tales. It is known that she married a man called Richard Morris whom she was said to beat. She was said to have been violent twice towards Richard. On the first occasion his response was to marry her on 8 May 1717 at St Mary's Church in Beddgelert. The second time he was mistreated he responded by becoming a Methodist. In fact she was said to have been feared until she was in her seventies and even then she could wrestle any man. Her celebrity was created by the Flintshire writer Thomas Pennant, who discussed her in one of his Tours in Wales.

Marged and her husband, who was also a harpist, ran a drinking establishment for copper miners in the parish of Llandwrog. She was reputed to be able to shoe a horse and make a boat, her own shoes, a harp or a violin. In the evenings she would entertain her customers on the harp. She was said to row large loads across the Snowdonian waters of Llyn Padarn and Llyn Peris and Thomas Pennant and others described her as "Queen of the Lakes".

Some sources say that Marged died aged 102 or 105, but the Oxford Dictionary of National Biography is clear that she died in her nineties in 1793. She was buried in Llanddeiniolen on 24 January.

== Legacy ==
Some tales about Marged ferch Ifan are extant as well as several versions of songs and tunes in Welsh, known as hen benillion ('old stanzas'). Traditionally the verses start with the first line Mae gan Marged fwyn ach Ifan, which translates as 'Fair Margaret daughter of Evan has'.

Mae gan Marged fwyn ach Ifan
Grafanc fawr a chrafanc fechan,
Un i dynnu'r cŵn o'r gongol,
A'r llall i dorri esgyrn pobol.

Translation:

Fair Margaret daughter of Evan has
A large claw and a small claw,
One to drag the dogs from the corner,
And the other to break people's bones.

William Hutton, an English poet and historian who toured Wales 16 times, wrote about Marged in his poem "The Welch Wedding" (1799). In it he discussed the robustness of rural, Welsh women, but Marged, and others like her such as Jane Lloyd, Catrin of Cwm-glâs and Grace Parry, so exceeded robustness that their very entry in the historical record was due to their perceived masculinity. For some, this raises questions as to where they sit on the grounds of gender diversity.
