= The Inn of the Sixth Happiness =

1958 film directed by Mark Robson

- Original film poster
- Directed by: Mark Robson
- Screenplay by: Isobel Lennart
- Based on: The Small Woman (1957 book) by Alan Burgess
- Produced by: Buddy Adler
- Starring: Ingrid Bergman; Curt Jürgens; Robert Donat
- Cinematography: Freddie Young
- Edited by: Ernest Walter
- Music by: Malcolm Arnold
- Production company: 20th Century Fox
- Distributed by: 20th Century Fox
- Release dates: 23 November 1958 (London, premiere); 11 December 1958 (US)
- Running time: 158 minutes
- Country: United States; United Kingdom
- Language: English
- Budget: $3.5 million
- Box office: $9 million (worldwide)

The Inn of the Sixth Happiness is a 1958 biographical war drama film directed by Mark Robson, and starring Ingrid Bergman, Curt Jürgens, and Robert Donat in his final film role. It is loosely based on the life of Gladys Aylward (Bergman), a British woman who became a missionary in China during the Second Sino-Japanese War, who became known as a protector of war orphans. The screenplay was adapted from Alan Burgess' 1957 biography of Aylward, The Small Woman.

The film was released by 20th Century Fox on 23 November 1958 to generally positive reviews and commercial success, though Aylward herself was highly critical of the film's inaccuracies. Robson was nominated for an Academy Award for Best Director. At the 12th British Academy Film Awards, The Inn of the Sixth Happiness received nominations Best Foreign Actor (Jürgens), Best Foreign Actress (Bergman), and Best British Screenplay (Isobel Lennart). The film also won a Special Golden Globe for "Best Film Promoting International Understanding."

== Plot ==
Gladys Aylward is rejected as a potential missionary to China because of her lack of education. Dr. Robinson, the senior missionary, feels sorry for her and secures her a position as a maid in the home of Sir Francis Jamison, a veteran explorer with contacts in China. Over the next few months, Aylward saves her money to purchase a ticket on the Trans-Siberian Railway, choosing the less expensive but more dangerous overland route to the East. On discovering Aylward has read dozens of books on China from his library, Sir Francis writes to his only surviving friend in China, veteran missionary, Jeannie Lawson, who agrees to accept Aylward as a much-needed assistant at her mission in the remote county of Yangcheng. Lawson has set up an inn for muleteers, where the men can get care for their animals, clean hot meals, communal beds without bugs, and Lawson's free Bible stories. Aylward slowly becomes acculturated, until Lawson tragically dies when a balcony collapses. Captain Lin Nan, the Eurasian commander of Yancheng's garrison, advises Aylward to go home and wishes her well as he leaves.

Aylward takes over running the inn, with the help of Yang, the devoted cook, who tells the stories himself while teaching Aylward Chinese. The local Mandarin appoints Aylward as his Foot Inspector, enforcing the government's command that the ancient practice of foot binding be eradicated. She succeeds in this assignment, winning the esteem of the people and of the Mandarin as she travels regularly through the mountains, earning the nickname "Jen-Ai" ("She who loves"), and becoming a Chinese citizen. When Lin, now a Colonel, returns to prepare the region for war with Japan, he is astonished to find the "naïve" Alward, still in Yancheng, has just stopped a prison riot by negotiating with the prisoners through Li, an inmate. To enlist men for the army, Colonel Lin accompanies Aylward on her rounds. Learning to appreciate each other's accomplishments, they eventually fall in love.

In 1937, Japan invades China. An air raid shatters the city, killing Yang. The Mandarin evacuates the population to the countryside, and former prisoner Li comes to help Aylward with her five adopted children. Lin returns with the news that the war is going badly, and the Mandarin must go to a safe haven. Lin wants Aylward to go too, but she insists she will live and die with "her people". Accepting her decision, Li kisses her as he leaves for duty. At a last meeting with his council, the Mandarin announces he is converting to Christianity to honour Aylward and the faith that underlies her work. He says farewell, certain they will not meet again.

In the now virtually deserted city, Aylward has gathered 50 orphans at the Inn, struggling to find food, facing a bitter winter, and not knowing where to go. Another 50 children arrive from another mission with a letter from the missionary telling her that trucks will evacuate them to a new home in the interior, but they must get to the Xi'an mission by 12 November, in three weeks, or the trucks will leave without them. The trip should take a week by road, but Lin and his men intercept them, warning that the Japanese control the road ahead and they must go over the mountains. Aylward believes this is why God wanted her to come to China. Giving her a map, Lin says he knows she will come back if she can and puts his ring on her hand.

After a long, difficult journey, a perilous river crossing, and the death of Li, who decoys a Japanese patrol away from them, the rest arrive safely in Xi'an on the day the trucks are to leave. The column of 100 children, led by Aylward, march through cheering crowds to the mission, singing "This Old Man”, which Aylward taught the children to help them keep in step. Greeted by Dr. Robinson, Aylward identifies herself, asking whether he remembers her. Nodding gravely, he replies, "Gladys Aylward, who wasn't qualified to come to China." He invites her to the children's village in the interior, but she declines, declaring that she is going "home", looking back toward the mountains.

== Cast ==
- Ingrid Bergman as Gladys Aylward
- Curt Jürgens as Captain Lin Nan
- Robert Donat as the Mandarin of Yangcheng
- Michael David as Hok-ah
- Athene Seyler as Jeannie Lawson
- Ronald Squire as Sir Francis Jamison
- Moultrie Kelsall as Dr. Robinson
- Richard Wattis as Mr. Murfin
- Peter Chong as Yang
- Tsai Chin as Sui-lan
- Burt Kwouk as Li
- Edith Sharpe as Secretary at China Inland Mission
- Joan Young as Sir Francis' cook
- Lian-Shin Yang as Woman with Baby
- Noël Hood as Miss Thompson

Uncredited

- André Mikhelson as Soviet Commissar
- Richard Marner as Soviet Soldier
- Vincent Wong as Chinese Captain

== Production ==
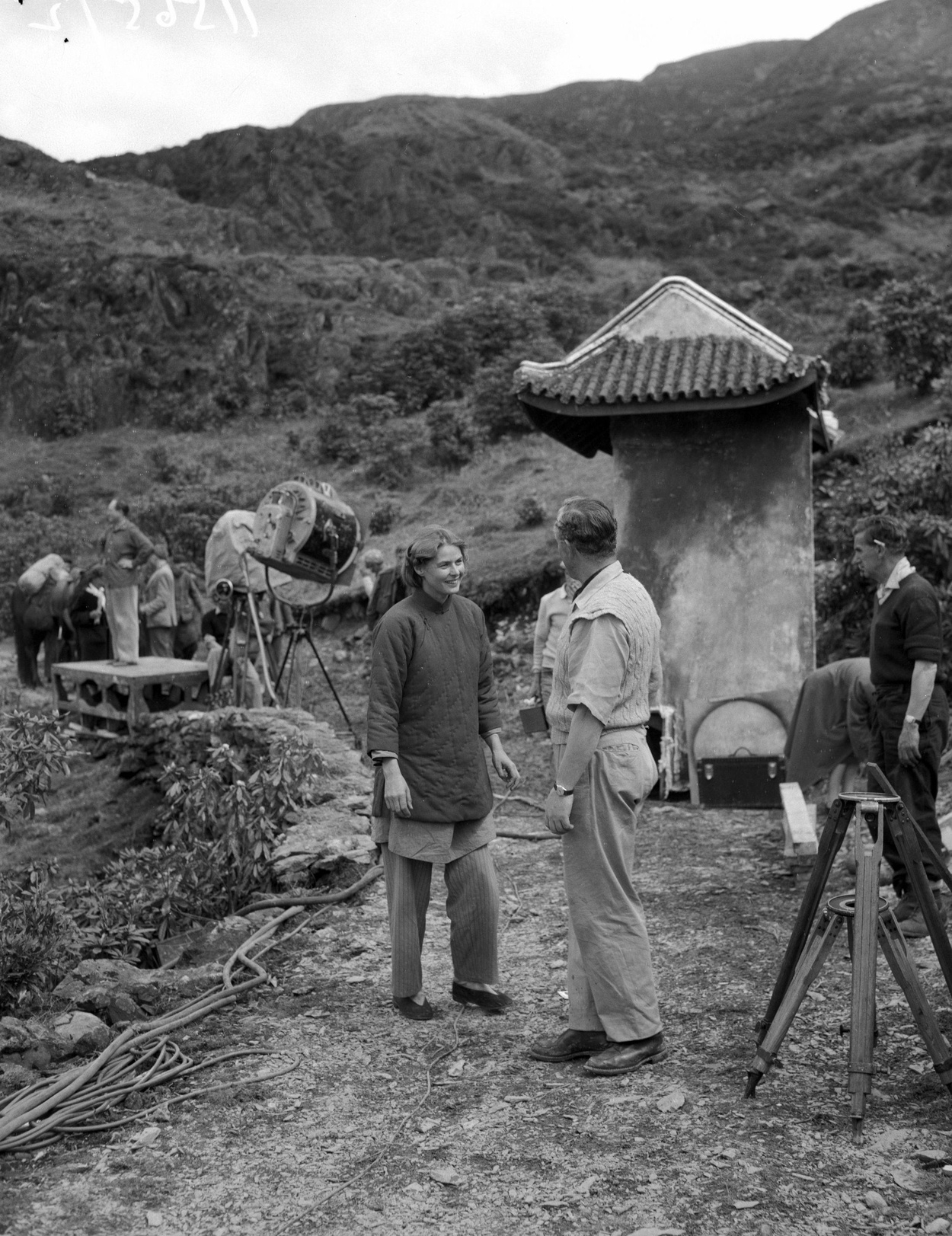
Shooting the film in Wales, photograph by Geoff Charles

The film was shot in CinemaScope using the DeLuxe Color process.

Robson originally planned to shoot the film in Taiwan, but plans changed when talks with Chiang Kai-shek's regime broke down. 20th Century Fox instead rented space at MGM British Studios Borehamwood, where the Chinese villages were built on the backlot, with location scenes filmed in Nantmor, near Beddgelert in the Snowdonia area of North Wales. Most of the children in the film were ethnic Chinese children from Liverpool, home to the oldest Chinese community in Europe.

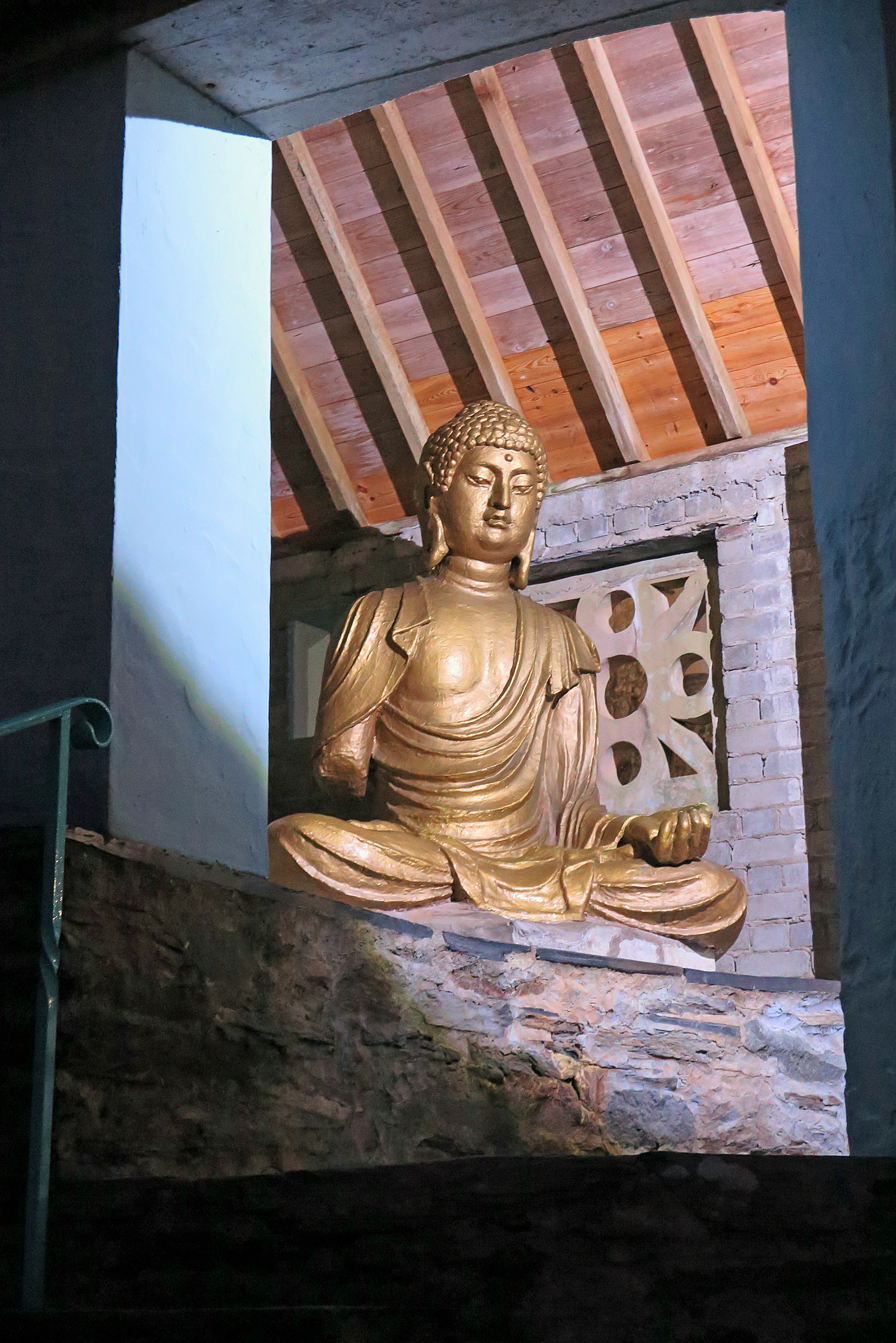
The Buddha statue, now at Portmeirion

A gold-painted statue of Buddha that was used on a set for the film is now located in the Italianate village of Portmeirion, North Wales. Sean Connery was considered for the role of Captain Lin. His screen test can be seen on the DVD.

Since the film's release, the filmmakers have been criticised for casting Ingrid Bergman, a tall woman with a Swedish accent, as Gladys Aylward, who was in fact short and had a cockney accent. Likewise, the two male leads, British actor Robert Donat and Austrian actor Curt Jurgens were not even Chinese (though Jurgens' character is said to be half-Dutch). Singer Bill Elliott sang the hit song "The Inn of the Sixth Happiness" with the Cyril Stapleton Orchestra.

This was the last film appearance of Robert Donat. He died on 9 June 1958, over five months before the film's premiere.

== Historical accuracy ==
The film was based on the biography The Small Woman (1957), by Alan Burgess.

Aylward herself was upset by the inaccuracy of the film. Although she found herself a figure of international interest thanks to the popularity of the film and television and media interviews, Aylward was mortified by her depiction in the film and the many liberties it took. The tall, Swedish Ingrid Bergman was inconsistent with Aylward's small stature, dark hair and Cockney accent. The struggles of Aylward and her family to effect her initial trip to China were skipped over in favour of the plot device of her employer "condescending to write to 'his old friend' Jeannie Lawson", and Aylward's dangerous, complicated travels across Russia and China were reduced to "a few rude soldiers", after which "Hollywood's train delivered her neatly to Tsientsin."

Many characters and places were renamed in the film, including Aylward's adopted children and the inn itself, which was actually called "the Inn of the Eight Happinesses" (in reference to the Chinese belief that the number eight is auspicious). Aylward is given the Chinese name Jiān Ài in the film, but she was actually known as Ài Wěi Dé (a Chinese approximation of "Aylward" with the meaning "virtuous one").

It is true that in 1938 Aylward led almost 100 children 100 miles to safety from Japanese invaders. But real life was very different from the film. At the end of the journey, "the brown-eyed, modest missionary was virtually unconscious and delirious with typhus and fever."

Captain Lin Nan was portrayed as half-European, a change which Aylward found insulting to his Chinese lineage. She also resented the Hollywood-embellished love scenes in the film; not only had she never kissed any man, but the film's ending portrayed her character abandoning the orphans in order to join the captain elsewhere, even though in reality she worked with orphans for the rest of her life. In 1958, the year of the film's release, she founded a children's home in Taiwan, which she continued to run until her death in 1970. She continues to be regarded as a national hero.

== Reception ==
The film was the second most popular film at the British box office in 1959 behind Carry on Nurse, with a gross of $700,000. In the United States, it was the eight highest-grossing film of 1958.

=== Awards and nominations ===
Award	Year	Category	Nominee	Result	Ref.
Academy Award	1959	Best Director	Mark Robson	Nominated	
British Academy Film Award	1959	Best British Screenplay	Isobel Lennart	Nominated	
British Academy Film Award	1959	Best Foreign Actress	Ingrid Bergman	Nominated	
British Academy Film Award	1959	Best Foreign Actor	Curd Jürgens	Nominated	
Directors Guild of America Award	1959	Outstanding Directorial Achievement in Theatrical Feature Film	Mark Robson	Nominated	
Golden Globe Award	1959	Best Actress in a Motion Picture – Drama	Ingrid Bergman	Nominated	
Golden Globe Award	1959	Best Actor in a Motion Picture – Drama	Robert Donat	Nominated (Note: Posthumous)	
Golden Globe Award	1959	Best Film Promoting International Understanding	—N/a	Nominated	
National Board of Review Award	1958	Best Actress	Ingrid Bergman	Won	
National Board of Review Award	1958	Best Actor	Robert Donat	Won (Note: Posthumous)	
