= Dafydd Nanmor =

Dafydd Nanmor (fl. 1450 – 1490) was a Welsh language poet born at Nanmor (or Nantmor), in Gwynedd, north-west Wales. He is one of the most significant poets of this period.

It is said that he was exiled to south Wales for overstepping the mark in his poetry (he sang a poem to a married local woman) and spent the rest of his life outside Gwynedd. His work was seen to have particular significance by the twentieth-century critic Saunders Lewis. Lewis saw him as a poet of philosophy who praised the ideal ruler as he praised his patrons, and who saw that within the Welsh tradition all who had privilege and power also had responsibilities towards family, community and nation.

It is believed that Rhys Nanmor was a bardic student of his.

== See also ==
- Rhys Goch Eryri, a Welsh poet who was a contemporary of Dafydd Nanmor and was acquainted with him

== Bibliography ==
- Thomas Roberts and Ifor Williams, The Poetical Works of Dafydd Nanmor (Cardiff, 1923)
