= Gladys Aylward =

Missionary in China (1902–1970)

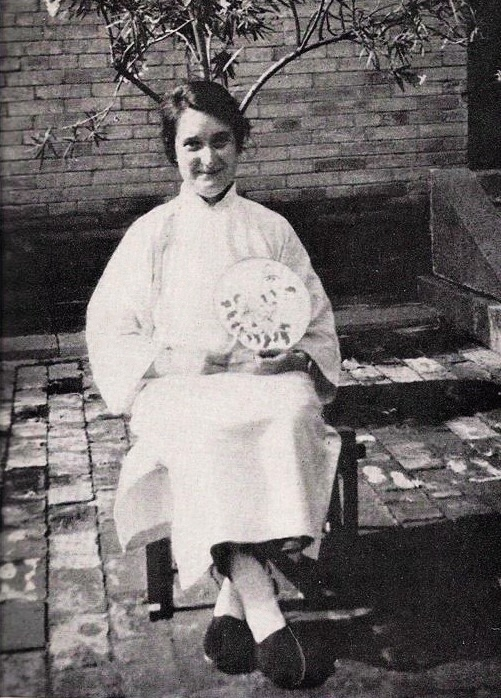
- Born: Gladys May Aylward; 24 February 1902; Edmonton, London, England
- Died: 3 January 1970 (aged 67); Taiwan
- Resting place: New Taipei, Taiwan
- Other name: 艾偉德
- Citizenship: British subject (1902–1936); Republic of China (1936–1970)
- Education: Silver Street School, Edmonton, London
- Occupation: Christian missionary

Gladys May Aylward (24 February 1902 – 3 January 1970) was a British evangelical Christian missionary to China, whose story was told in the book The Small Woman: The Heroic Story of Gladys Aylward, by Alan Burgess, published in 1957. The book served as the basis for the film The Inn of the Sixth Happiness, starring Ingrid Bergman, in 1958. The film was produced by Twentieth Century Fox, and filmed entirely in North Wales and England.

== Early life ==
Aylward was born in 1902, one of three children of Thomas John Aylward (a postman) and Rosina Florence, a working-class family from Edmonton, North London. From her early teens, Gladys worked as a housemaid. Following a calling to go overseas as a Christian missionary, she was accepted by the China Inland Mission to study in a preparatory three-month course for aspiring missionaries. Because of her lack of progress in learning the Chinese language, she was not offered further training.

On 15 October 1930, having worked for Sir Francis Younghusband, Aylward spent her life savings on a train passage to Yangcheng, Shanxi Province, China. The dangerous trip took her across Siberia on the Trans-Siberian Railway at a time when the Soviet Union and China were in an undeclared war. She was detained by the Russians, but managed to evade them with local help and a lift from a Japanese ship. She then traveled across Japan with the help of the British Consul, and took another ship to China.

== Work in China ==
Upon arriving in Yangcheng County, Aylward worked with an older missionary, Jeannie Lawson, to help manage The Inn of the Eight Happinesses (Chinese: 八福客栈; pinyin: bāfú kèzhàn), a name based on the eight virtues of Love, Virtue, Gentleness, Tolerance, Loyalty, Truth, Beauty and Devotion. There, she and Mrs. Lawson not only provided hospitality for travelers but would also share stories about Jesus, in hopes of spreading nascent Christianity. For a time she served as an assistant to the Government of the Republic of China as a "foot inspector" by touring the countryside to enforce the new law against footbinding of young Chinese girls. She met with much success in a field that had produced much resistance and even violence at times against the inspectors.

Aylward became a national of the Republic of China in 1936 and was a revered figure among the people, taking in orphans and adopting several herself, intervening in a volatile prison riot and advocating prison reform, risking her life many times to help those in need. In 1938, the region was invaded by Japanese forces, and Aylward led more than 100 orphans to safety over the mountains, despite being wounded and sick, personally caring for them (and converting many to Christianity).

She did not return to Britain until 1949, when her life in China was thought to be in great danger from the Communists – the army was actively seeking out missionaries. Settling in Basingstoke, she gave many lectures on her work. After her mother died, Aylward sought a return to China. After rejection by the Communist government and a stay in British-administered Hong Kong, she finally settled in Taiwan in 1958. There, she founded the Gladys Aylward Orphanage, where she worked until her death in 1970.

== The Inn of the Sixth Happiness ==
A film based on her life, The Inn of the Sixth Happiness, was released in 1958. It drew from the biography The Small Woman, by Alan Burgess. Although she found herself a figure of international interest because of the film's popularity and television and media interviews, Aylward was mortified by her depiction in the film and the liberties it took. The tall (1.75m/5' 9"), blonde Swedish actress Ingrid Bergman was inconsistent with Aylward's small stature, dark hair, and North London accent. The struggles of Aylward and her family to effect her initial trip to China were disregarded in favor of a movie plot device of an employer 'condescending to write to "his old friend" Jeannie Lawson'. Also, Aylward's dangerous, complicated travels across Russia, China, and Japan were reduced to 'a few rude soldiers', after which 'Hollywood's train delivered her neatly to Tientsin'. Many characters and names were changed, even when these names had significant meaning, such as those of her adopted children and that of the inn, which was named in fact for the Chinese belief in the number 8 as being auspicious. Her own name was changed; in real life, she was given the Chinese name Aiweide (Chinese: 艾偉德; pinyin: Àiwěidé; lit. 'The Virtuous One' – a phonetic approximation to Aylward), but in the film, she was given the name Jen-Ai (Chinese: 真愛; pinyin: Zhēn'ài; lit. 'true love'). Colonel Lin Nan was portrayed as half-European, a change which she found insulting to his real Chinese lineage, and she felt that the Hollywood-embellished love scenes in the film damaged her reputation. Not only had she never kissed a man, but the film's ending portrayed her character leaving the orphans to rejoin the colonel elsewhere, even though in reality she did not retire from working with orphans until she was 60 years old. She dedicated the rest of her life to the orphans in Taiwan and was buried in Taipei.

== Death and legacy ==
Aylward died on 3 January 1970, about a month and a half short of her 68th birthday, and was buried in a small cemetery on the campus of Christ's College in Guandu (關渡基督書院), New Taipei, Taiwan. Her ministry in Taipei continues to develop and is now called Bethany Children's Home. (Note: https://bethany.org.tw) The new director, Sharon Chiang (Chinese: 江秀圈), was called from Seattle to develop Bethany Children's Home further for its new vision and new building.

A London secondary school, formerly known as 'Weir Hall and Huxley', was renamed the Gladys Aylward School (now the Aylward Academy) shortly after her death. There is a blue commemorative plaque on the house where Gladys lived near the school at 67 Cheddington Road, London N18.

A "house" was named after Gladys Aylward at Fernwood Comprehensive (formerly Secondary Modern) School, in Wollaton, Nottingham, and likewise at St Nicholas’ primary school in Crosby, Liverpool, and also Batley Girls’ Grammar School, which she visited while touring the UK in 1963.

Numerous books, short stories, and films have been developed about the life and work of Gladys Aylward.

== Further sources ==
=== Archives ===
- The archive of Gladys Aylward, including artefacts from her time in China, is held by SOAS Special Collections. Digitised material from the collection is available to view online here.

=== Bibliography ===
- Aylward, Gladys, MS 291571: Letters and relics of Gladys Aylward, missionary to China, School of African and Oriental Studies, University of London
- Aylward, Gladys (1980), Gladys Aylward: The Little Woman, Moody Publishers, ISBN 978-0-8024-2986-5
- Burgess, A (1957), The Small Woman (New Impression ed.), Pan Books, ISBN 0-330-10196-X
- Hunter, C (1971), Gladys Aylward: Her Personal Story, Coverdale House Publishers, ISBN 0-902088-25-4
- Latham, R. O. (1952), Gladys Aylward, One of the Undefeated: The Story of Gladys Aylward, Edinburgh House Press, OCLC 24941398
- Thompson, P (1971), London Sparrow: The Story of Gladys Aylward, Word Books, ISBN 0-85009-026-1
- Benge, Janet; Benge, Geoff (1998), Gladys Aylward: The Adventure of a Lifetime, YWAM, ISBN 978-1-57658-019-6
- Purves, Carol (2005), Chinese Whispers: The Gladys Aylward Story, Day One Publications, ISBN 978-1-903087-57-2
- Jackson, Dave; Jackson, Neta (1994), Flight of the Fugitives: Gladys Aylward, Bethany House Publishers, ISBN 978-1-55661-466-8
- Wellman, Sam (1998). Gladys Aylward: Missionary in China. Barbour.

=== Videography ===
- The Inn of the Sixth Happiness (1958) – feature film
- Gladys Aylward, the Small Woman with a Great God (2008) – documentary
- Torchlighters: The Gladys Aylward Story (2008) – animated DVD for children ages 8–12
