= Rhys Goch ap Rhicert =

Welsh poet

- Occupation: Poet

Rhys Goch ap Rhicert (fl. 1300) was a Welsh poet.

== Biography ==
Rhys lived at Tir Iarll in Glamorgan. According to the Iolo MSS. (p. 229), his father was a son of Einion ap Collwyn, one of the figures of the Glamorgan conquest legend. Stephens has shown (Literature of the Kymry, 2nd edit. pp. 454–6) that this parentage is impossible, since Rhys's immediate descendants belong to the fourteenth and fifteenth centuries, and his poetry is of the age preceding that of Dafydd ap Gwilym. He is in error, no doubt, in stating that it is poetry without ‘cynghanedd,’ but the alliteration is not uniformly employed, as in later work (Hanes Llenyddiaeth Gymreig, by Gweirydd ap Rhys, pp. 168–9). Rhys's poems (twenty in number) first became known through their publication, from a manuscript of John Bradford of Tir Iarll (d. 1780) in the Iolo MSS. (pp. 228–51); his name was previously almost unknown. They are mostly love poems, marked by much felicity of expression and a keen appreciation of natural beauty, qualities in which Rhys anticipates Dafydd ap Gwilym, his younger contemporary and poetic heir. He was the father of Rhys Brydydd or Rhys Llwyd of Llan Haran, a poet of the end of the fourteenth century (Myvyrian Archaiology, 2nd edit. p. 826; Iolo MSS. pp. 200, 289).
