= Rhys Goch Eryri =

Distinguish from Rhys Goch ap Rhicert and Rhys Goch Glyndyfrdwy (fl. 1460)

Rhys Goch Eryri (or Rhys ab Dafydd) (fl. 1385 – 1448), was a 15th-century bard who lived at Hafod Garegog, near Beddgelert in North Wales. He was acquainted with Dafydd Nanmor, who lived in neighbouring Nantmor, and it is possible that Rhys Goch was a teacher to him. One of his poems urges a fox to kill Dafydd Nanmor's peacock. About 30 of his poems on various subjects are preserved.

He was reputed to be a friend and strong supporter of Owain Glyndŵr, though no poetry to him has survived.

George Borrow, in his book Wild Wales, reports that Festiniog was his birthplace :

I was approaching Festiniog the birthplace of Rhys Goch, who styled himself Rhys Goch of Eryri or Red Rhys of Snowdon, a celebrated bard, and a partisan of Owen Glendower, who lived to an immense age, and who, as I had read, was in the habit of composing his pieces seated on a stone which formed part of a Druidical circle, for which reason the stone was called the chair of Rhys Goch.

According to tradition Rhys Goch spent his whole life in Eryri (Snowdonia), and was buried in Beddgelert churchyard.
