= Saint Guinefort =

Legendary dog venerated as a folk saint

- A painting based on Saint Guinefort by Jeanne-Elisabeth Chaudet

Dog Saint
- Died: 13th-century near Lyon, France
- Venerated in: Folk Catholicism
- Feast: Venerated locally on August 22
- Patronage: Infants
- Catholic cult suppressed: by Stephen of Bourbon

Saint Guinefort (modern French pronunciation: [ɡinfɔʁ]) was a legendary 13th-century French greyhound that received local veneration as a folk saint.

== Legend ==
Guinefort's story is a variation on the well-travelled "dog defends master's child against animal assailant" motif, as indexed in the international classification system as B524ff, similar to the Welsh story of the dog Gelert.

In one of the earliest versions of the story, described by the Dominican friar Stephen of Bourbon in 1250, Guinefort the greyhound belonged to a Lord who lived in a castle near Lyon.

One day, the unnamed Lord and Lady of the castle left their infant son home alone, sleeping in his cradle. When the nurse returned to the house, she found the nursery in chaos – the cradle spattered with blood and Guinefort sat beside it with bloody jaws. Her screams drew first the Lady of the house and then the Lord. He, believing Guinefort to have devoured his son, slew the dog with his sword. Only then did the family approach to find their son sleeping in his cradle, safe and sound, along with the body of a snake killed by dog bites. Guinefort had killed the snake and saved the child. On realizing the mistake the family dropped the dog down a well, covered it with stones and planted trees around it, setting up a shrine for Guinefort.

Upon learning of the dog's martyrdom, the local peasants venerated the dog as a saint and visited his shrine when they were in need, especially mothers with sick children. They honored the dog as a martyr who could help heal sicknesses and other needs.

As Protestant churches emerged in the 16th century, they "criticized the cult of Guinefort seeing in it an example of the abuses and enacted errors of the Catholic Church." The Catholic hierarchy adopted the continued critique, and sought to suppress Guinefort belief and practices, and ostracize practitioners.

The custom was regarded as harmful and superstitious by the Church, which made efforts to eradicate it and enacted a fine for the continued practice. Community memory of the practices was still present in the 1970s, with the last known visit by someone to Saint Guinefort Wood to effect a cure for a sick child occurring around the 1940s.

Historian John Bossy used this canine folk saint to explore medieval attitudes to sanctity.

== See also ==
- Gelert
