= Hovel in the Hills =

Back-to-the-land memoir published 1977

- Author: Elizabeth West
- Subject: Back-to-the-land movement
- Published: 1977 (Faber and Faber)
- OCLC: 3203547

Hovel in the Hills: An Account of the Simple Life is the first book in a three-book non-fiction series by British writer Elizabeth West (Elizabeth "Betty" Prewett West) recording her and her partner’s experiences as part of the back-to-the-land movement in the United Kingdom in the mid-20th century. Hovel in the Hills was originally published by Faber and Faber in London in 1977.

== Background ==
In Hovel, Elizabeth and her husband Alan exchange their city jobs for subsistence living in a small, soggy cottage in Wales between 1965 and 1974. West calls their home Hafod in the book, which is a "pseudonym" from the Welsh word meaning "summer cottage." The real name of the cottage, located near Nebo, Betws-y-Coed, Llanrwst, is Bron Haul or Bron yr Haul.

The sequels are Garden in the Hills and Kitchen in the Hills, the latter being primarily a cookbook.

”I wrote to Mrs West via the publisher to tell her I had at last found a copy and she wrote back to tell me that she'd never been happy with the book as the publishers had made her change all the recipes to feed four people and add in all the oven temperatures. Of course all her cooking had been done for two and often on a wood-fired stove. She thanked me for enclosing a SAE and said that they'd been unable to write back to people during their years at Hafod as even buying a stamp was impossible to afford.”

Elizabeth later wrote a fourth book about "the good life" at a different property called A Patch in the Forest. She also published two books about working at a school, one of which was entitled Insufferable Little Children.

Hovel has been compared to Ruth Ruck's Place of Stones as both describe mid-century rural Welsh idylls and both have been reprinted multiple times over many decades.

== Reception ==
The Ladies of Llangollen club notes, "Long, long out of print…this first came out in 1977, soon after The Good Life first hit the air. Self-sufficiency had found its author, though favorite chapters deal with their struggles to find temporary jobs to pay the bills."

An unidentified critic on the Worldcat catalog listing states that Hovel in the Hills is "an extremely good account of the ‘simple life' which the author and her husband lead in their primitive cottage in Wales. The author's style is humorous and direct as she describes the original and resourceful ways they cope with the endless problems they encounter. Not being able to make ends meet financially they have to leave their cottage for four- and five-week stints as a free-lance cook, maid and handyman team which gives some eye-opening and entertaining descriptions of this side of their life."

The Farms on My Bookshelf book-review series states, "They live a very frugal life and are foragers long before this concept becomes fashionable. The book can be read as a manual on how to live on very little money. Elizabeth is at her best when writing about coping for oneself and about plants and animals."

Vivian Bird wrote in the Birmingham Post in 1977, "[I] found it difficult to accept that a woman who could write so beautifully about the song of a curlew could have been a typist at Bristol, engaged peripherally on the construction of the evil-sounding Concorde."

David Holloway in the Daily Telegraph review in 1977: "This is the one account of self-imposed exile from civilization that I implicitly believe...in one really hilarious passage, Mrs West explains that her husband is a 'precision botcher'...Mrs West, though essentially modest, is clearly someone of great strength of character."

And finally Christopher Wordsworth in the London Observer in 1977 was entirely skeptical of the purported romance of self-sufficiency but was nonetheless able to take the book on its own terms: "Mrs West's account of their coping is a useful text for pioneers, but it is her response to the mountains and nature...that justifies the project and her otherwise unremarkable but good-natured book. It will be noted that the price of this freedom is eternal indigence and physical slavery...but good luck to them both. Long may they enjoy immunity from the cyanide of inflation...and the feeling as the weather thickens of being equipped for a siege."

== Legacy ==
The most widely quoted passage from Hovel in the Hills may be this bit about bicycles:

When man invented the bicycle he reached the peak of his attainments. Here was a machine of precision and balance for the convenience of man. And (unlike subsequent inventions for man’s convenience) the more he used it, the fitter his body became. Here, for once, was a product of man’s brain that was entirely beneficial to those who used it, and of no harm or irritation to others. Progress should have stopped when man invented the bicycle.

— Elizabeth West, Hovel in the Hills

== Chapter titles ==
1. We take to the hills
2. Troubles
3. More troubles
4. "Mod. Cons."
5. Charlie the Windcharger
6. Gadgetry and Botchery
7. Gardening for fun
8. Wild creatures
9. Birds
10. More birds
11. Earning money
12. Earning more money
13. Losing money
14. Y Cymry
15. The simple life, on a pittance
16. Appendix A: The Hafod bird list
17. Appendix B: Wild food eaten, in season, at Hafod

== See also ==
- Hafod, Swansea § Name origins
- cy:Hovel in the Hills
