= Culture of Gwynedd in the High Middle Ages =

Culture and Society in Gwynedd during the High Middle Ages refers to a period in the History of Wales spanning the 11th, 12th, and 13th centuries (AD 1000–1300). The High Middle Ages were preceded by the Early Middle Ages and followed by the Late Middle Ages. Gwynedd is located in the north of Wales.

Distinctive achievements in Gwynedd during this period include further development of Medieval Welsh literature, for instance in the poetry of those of the Beirdd y Tywysogion (Welsh for Poets of the Princes) associated with the court of Gwynedd, the reformation of bardic schools, and the continued development of Cyfraith Hywel (The Law of Hywel, or Welsh law); all three of which further contributed to the development of a Welsh national identity in the face of Anglo-Norman encroachment of Wales which culminated with the conquest of Wales by Edward I.

Gwynedd's traditional territory included Anglesey (Ynys Môn) and all of north Wales between the River Dyfi in the south and River Dee (Welsh Dyfrdwy) in the northeast. The Irish Sea lies to the north and west, and lands formerly part of the Powys border the south-east. Gwynedd's strength was due in part to the region's mountainous geography which made it difficult for foreign invaders to campaign in the country and impose their will effectively.

Gwynedd emerged from the Early Middle Ages having suffered from increasing Viking raids and various occupations by rival Welsh princes, causing political and social upheaval. With the historic Aberffraw family displaced, by the mid 11th century Gwynedd was united with the rest of Wales by the conquest of Gruffydd ap Llywelyn, followed by the Norman invasions between 1067 and 1100.

After the restoration of the Aberffraw family in Gwynedd, a series of successful rulers such as Gruffudd ap Cynan and Owain Gwynedd in the late 11th and 12th centuries, and Llywelyn the Great and his grandson Llywelyn ap Gruffudd in the 13th century, led to the emergence of the Principality of Wales, based on Gwynedd.

The emergence of the principality in the 13th century showed that all the elements necessary for the growth of Welsh statehood were in place, and that Wales was independent de facto, according to historian Dr John Davies. As part of the Principality of Wales, Gwynedd retained Welsh laws and customs and home rule until the Edwardian Conquest of Wales of 1282.

== Settlements, architecture, and economy ==
When Gruffudd ap Cynan died in 1137 he left a more stable realm than had existed in Gwynedd for more than 100 years. No foreign army was able to cross the Conwy into upper Gwynedd. The stability in upper Gwynedd provided by Gruffudd and his son Owain Gwynedd, between 1101 and 1170, allowed Gwynedd's inhabitants to plan for the future without fear that home and harvest would "go to the flames" from invaders.

Settlements in Gwynedd became more permanent, with buildings of stone replacing timber structures. Stone churches in particular were built across Gwynedd, with so many limewashed that "Gwynedd was bespangled with them as is the firmament with stars". Gruffudd had built stone churches at his princely manors, and Lloyd suggests that his example led to the rebuilding of churches in stone in Penmon, Aberdaron, and Towyn in the Norman fashion.

By the 13th century, Gwynedd was the cornerstone of the Principality of Wales (that is Pura Wallia), which came to encompass three-quarters of the area of modern Wales: "from Anglesey to Machen, from the outskirts of Chester to the outskirts of Cydweli". By 1271, Prince Llywelyn ap Gruffudd could claim a growing population of about 200,000: a little less than three-quarters of the total Welsh population.

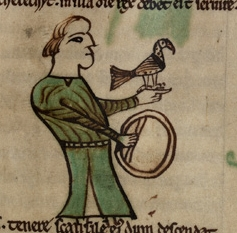
Drawing of a falconer from Peniarth 28 manuscript. Wales exported hawks.

Population increase was common throughout Europe in the 13th century, but in Wales it was more pronounced. By Llywelyn II's reign as much as 10 per cent of the population were town-dwellers. Additionally, "unfree slaves... had long disappeared" from within Pura Wallia due in large part form the social upheavals of the 11th century," argued Davies. The increase in free men allowed the prince to call on and field a far more substantial and professional army.

The increase in population in Gwynedd, and in the Principality of Wales as a whole, allowed a greater diversification of the economy. The Meirionnydd tax rolls evidence the thirty-seven various professions present in Meirionnydd immediately before the Edwardian Conquest of 1282.

Of these professions, there were eight goldsmiths, four professional bards (poets), 26 shoemakers, a doctor in Cynwyd and an hotel keeper in Maentwrog, and 28 priests, two of whom were university graduates. Also present were a significant number of fishermen, administrators and clerics, professional men and craftsmen.

With the average temperature of Wales a degree or two higher than it is today, more Welsh lands were arable: "a crucial bonus for a country like Wales", wrote historian Dr John Davies.

Important for Gwynedd and Pura Wallia were more developed trade routes, which allowed the introduction of the windmill, the fulling-mill, and the horse collar (which doubled the useful power of the horse).

Gwynedd exported cattle, skins, cheese, timber, horses, wax, dogs, hawks, and fleeces, and also flannel (with the growth of fulling mills). Flannel was second only to cattle among the principality's exports. In exchange, the principality imported salt, wine, wheat, and other luxuries from London and Paris. But most importantly for its defence, Gwynedd also imported iron and specialised weaponry. The English exploited Welsh dependence on foreign imports to wear down Gwynedd and the Principality of Wales in times of conflict between the two countries.

== Poetry, literature, and music ==
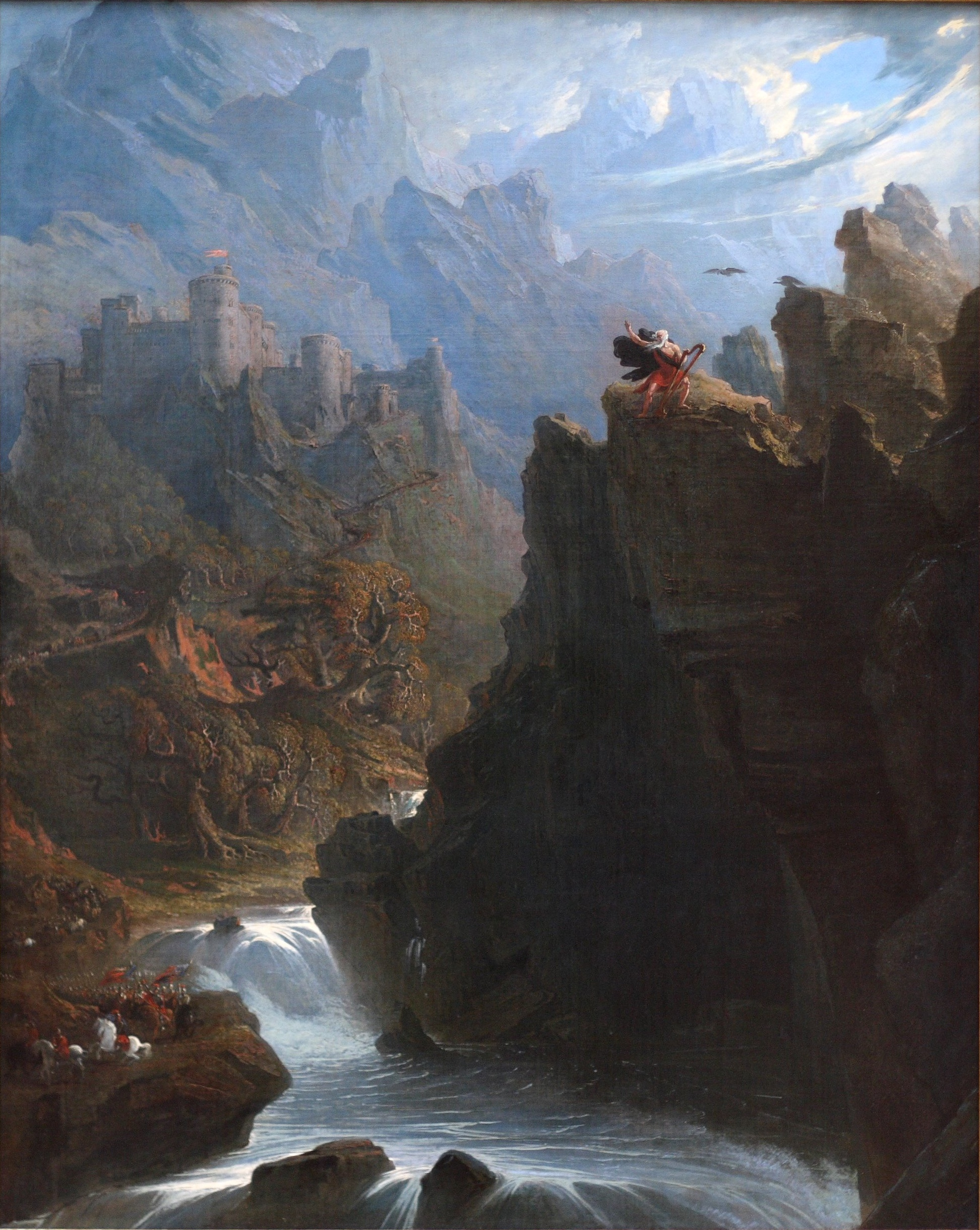
The Bard by John Martin, 1817

The more stable social and political environment provided by the Aberffraw administration allowed the natural development of Welsh culture, particularly in literature. Tradition originating from The History of Gruffudd ap Cynan attributes Gruffudd I as reforming the orders of bards and musicians. Welsh literature of the High Middle Ages demonstrated "vigour and a sense of commitment" as new ideas reached Wales, even in "the wake of the invaders", according to historian John Davies. Additionally, contacts with continental Europe "sharpened Welsh pride", argues Davies.

In Welsh the poets of this period are known as Beirdd y Tywysogion (Poets of the Princes) or Y Gogynfeirdd (The Less Early Poets). The main source for the poetry of the 12th and 13th centuries is the Hendregadredd manuscript, an anthology of court poetry brought together at the Cistercian Strata Florida Abbey from about 1282 until 1350.

The bards of this period were schooled professionals and members of a guild of poets, a kind of bardic guild whose rights and responsibilities were enshrined in native Welsh law. Members of this guild worked within a developed literary culture and with prescribed literary and oral syntax. Bardic families were common—the poet Meilyr Brydydd had a poet son and at least two poet grandsons—but it was also usual for the craft of poetry to be taught formally in bardic schools, which might only be run by the pencerdd (chief poet).

According to Welsh law, the prince retained the skills of several bards at court, the chief of which were the pencerdd and the bardd teulu. The pencerdd, the head bard, was the top of his profession and a special chair was set aside for him in the princely court in an honoured position next to the heir, the edling. When the pencerdd performed he was expected to sing twice: once in honour of God, and once in honour of the prince. The bardd teulu was part of the prince's teulu, or household guard, and was responsible for singing for the military retinue before going into battle, and also for successful military campaigns. The bardd teulu also composed for and sang to the princess, often privately at her leisure. A private performance by a bard was a sign of high status and prestige. The clêr were itinerant poet-musicians, considered the lowest tier of the poetic tradition, and often disparaged by the court poets as mere "minstrels".

The poetry praises the military prowess of the prince in a language that is deliberately antiquarian and obscure, echoing the earlier praise poetry tradition of Taliesin. There are also some religious poems and poetry in praise of women.

With the death of the last native prince of Wales in 1282 the tradition gradually disappears. In fact, the elegy by Gruffudd ab yr Ynad Coch (fl. 1277–83) on the death of Llywelyn ap Gruffudd is one of the most notable poems of the era. Other prominent poets of this period associated with the court of Gwynedd include:

- Meilyr Brydydd, fl. ca. 1100–1137; the earliest of the Gogynfeirdd
- Llywarch ap Llywelyn, fl. 1174/5-1220, (c. 1195) sang of Llywelyn the Great's victory over Dafydd ab Owain
- Bleddyn Fardd, fl. ca. 1258–1284
- Cynddelw Brydydd Mawr; fl. ca. 1155–1200
- Dafydd Benfras, fl. ca. 1220–58

A rather different poet of this period was Hywel ab Owain Gwynedd (died 1170), known as the Poet-Prince. As the son and heir of Prince Owain Gwynedd, he was not a professional poet.

== The Welsh Church in Gwynedd ==
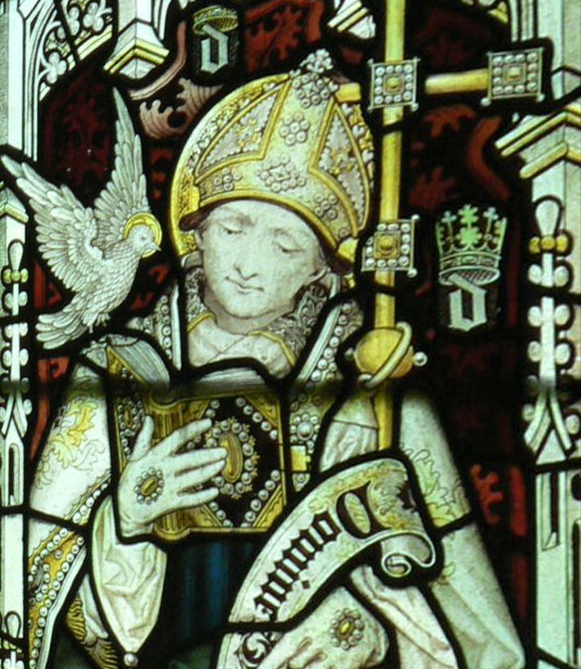
St. David, the patron saint of Wales.

=== Celtic Christian traditions ===
Prior to the Norman invasions between 1067–1101, Christians of Gwynedd shared many of the spiritual traditions and ecclesiastical institutions found throughout Wales and other Celtic nations, customs inherited from the Celtic Christianity of the Early Middle Ages.

However, Welsh ecclesiastics questioned to what degree the Papacy could impose Canon law upon them, especially with regard to the marriage of priests, the role of women both in the Church and in society, and the status of "illegitimate" children in society, with canon law conflicting with native Welsh law and customs. Welsh bishops also denied that the Archbishop of Canterbury held authority over them. Professor John Davies argued that there were dangers inherent in Welsh bishops submitting to an ecclesiastical authority "that would, by necessity, be heavily under the influence ... of an English king".

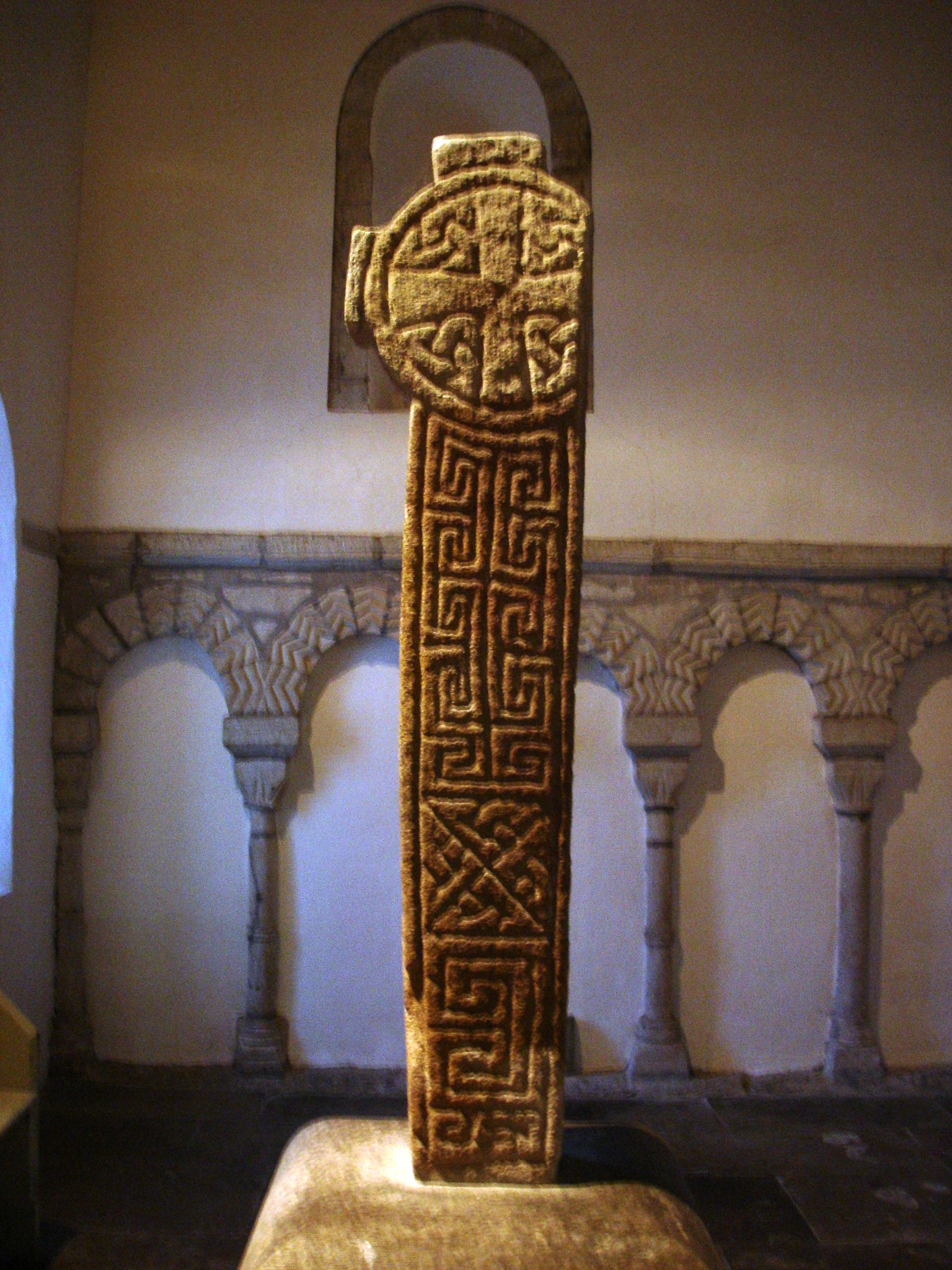
The 10th century Penmon Cross is an example of Celtic Christian traditions in Gwynedd.

By the 11th century, the Welsh Church consisted of three dioceses which were tied closely together by a strong sense of community and a shared sentiment in religious practice, but were independent of each other and whose boundaries were somewhat indeterminate. Central to this organisational approach was the rural nature of Welsh settlements which favoured localised and autonomous monastic communities called clasau (sing. clas).

Clasau were administered by an abod (abbot) and contained a number of small timber-built churches and dormitory huts. Welsh monasticism highly valued asceticism, and the most celebrated Welsh ascetic was the 6th century St. David, who developed a monastic rule which emphasised hard work, encouraged vegetarianism, and promoted temperance. Women, who held a higher status in Welsh law and custom than elsewhere in Europe, could hold quasi-sacerdotal (semi-priestly) roles in the Welsh Church, noted Davies. As celibacy was not an important aspect of the Welsh Church, many priests married and had children; some monasteries were single or extended family endeavours, and some ecclesiastical offices became hereditary. For many Welsh people, monasticism was a familial way of life spent in devotion to Christ. As marriage was viewed as a secular social contract and governed by well-established Welsh law, divorce was recognised by the Welsh Church.

The Diocese of Bangor was the episcopal see for all of Upper and Lower Gwynedd.

=== Latin Christianity ===
Post-Norman Invasion

Gruffydd I of Gwynedd promoted the primacy of the episcopal see of Bangor in Gwynedd, and funded the building of Bangor Cathedral during the episcopate of David the Scot, Bishop of Bangor, between 1120–1139. Gruffydd's remains were interred in a tomb in the presbytery of Bangor Cathedral.

== Government and law ==
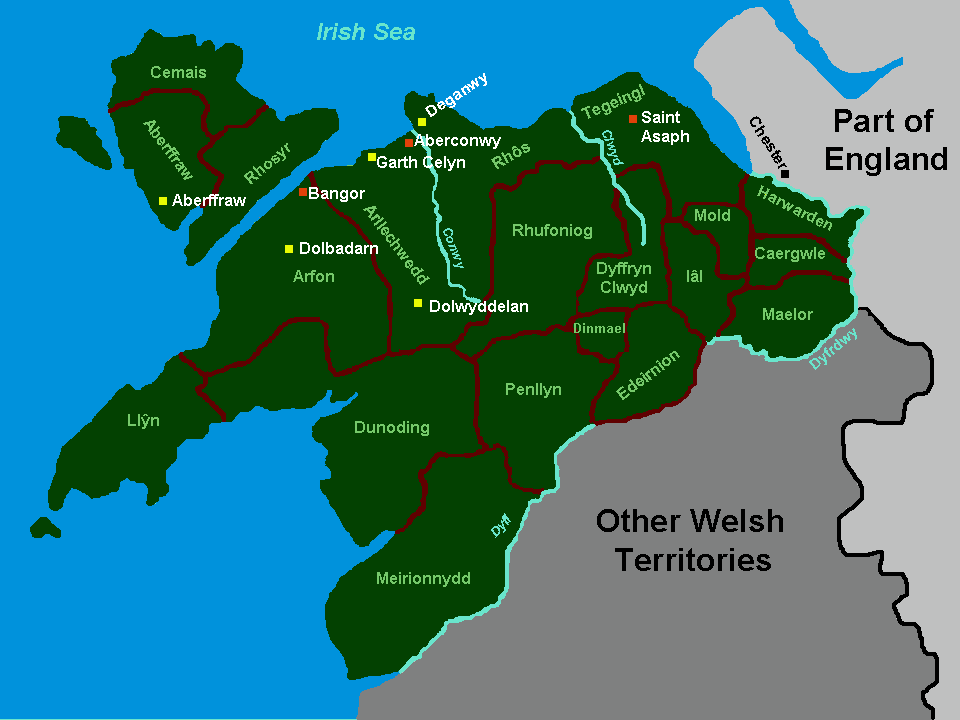
Principal administrative divisions of medieval Gwynedd (traditional territorial extent)

Aberffraw's traditional sphere of influence in north Wales included the Isle of Anglesey as their early seat of authority, and Gwynedd Uwch Conwy (Gwynedd above the Conway, or Upper Gwynedd), and the Perfeddwlad ("the Middle Country"), also known as Gwynedd Is Conwy (Gwynedd below the Conwy, or Lower Gwynedd). Additional lands were acquired through vassalage or conquest, and by regaining lands lost to Marcher lords, particularly those of Ceredigion, Powys Fadog, and Powys Wenwynwyn. However these areas were always considered additions to Gwynedd, never as part of Gwynedd itself.

The extent of the kingdom varied with the strength of the current ruler. The kingdom was administered under Welsh custom through 13 cantrefi (hundreds, plural of cantref), each containing, in theory, one hundred settlements or trefi. Most cantrefi were divided further into cymydau (English: commotes).

== Gwynedd at war ==
According to Sir John Edward Lloyd, the challenges of campaigning in Gwynedd and Wales as a whole were exposed during the Norman invasions between 1081 and 1101. If a defender could bar any road, control any river crossing or mountain pass, and control the coastline around Wales, then the risks of extended campaigning in Wales were too great. With control of the Menai, an army could regroup on Anglesey; without control of the Menai an army could be stranded there, and any occupying force on Anglesey could deny the vast harvest of that island to the Welsh. And the Welsh throughout Wales could lead retaliatory strikes from mountain strongholds or remote forested glens.

The Welsh were revered for the skills of their bowmen; and they learned from the Normans. During the generations of warfare and close contact with the Normans, Gruffydd I and other Welsh leaders learned the arts of knighthood and adapted them for Wales. By Gruffydd's death in 1137, Gwynedd could field hundreds of heavy well-armed cavalry as well as their traditional bowmen and infantry.

In the end Wales was defeated militarily by the improved ability of the English navy to blockade or seize areas essential for agricultural production, such as Anglesey. Lack of food would force the disbandment of any large Welsh force besieged in the mountains. During the revolt of Owain Glyndŵr the Welsh adapted the new skills they had learnt to guerilla tactics and lightning raids. Owain reputedly used the mountains to such advantage that many of the exasperated English soldiery suspected him of being a magician able to control the natural elements. During the Hundred Years' War, Welsh longbowmen were recruited by the English army to serve in France.
