= Gorhoffedd Hywel ab Owain Gwynedd =

Poem

"Gorhoffedd Hywel ab Owain Gwynedd", sometimes known in English as "Hywel's Boast", has historically been considered a poem by the mid-12th-century prince, warrior and poet Hywel ab Owain Gwynedd. However, some scholars now believe it to be two quite separate poems by Hywel which have become fused together in the process of manuscript transmission. It is his best-known work. In the first half the poet expresses his love of his native Gwynedd – its scenery, its men and women – and boasts of his own prowess in defending them; in the second he praises several Welsh ladies and tells us how many of them are sexual conquests of his. According to the writer Gwyn Williams, "The sharpness and clarity of the North Wales landscape has never been so well caught in words, nor have tenderness and humour been better mingled in the expression of love".

== Summary ==
Beginning with the image of the grave of Rhufawn Befr, washed by the "foaming white wave", the poet lists those aspects of Gwynedd that he loves: its landscapes of sea-coast, flourishing lowland and wild mountain, and its sturdy soldiers and beautiful women. He boasts of his own exploits in battle before returning to the image of the wave-washed grave. He praises the nightingale and the coast of Meirionnydd, "where I had a white arm for pillow", then tells us that he has ridden as far as Rheged, far to the north, where he yearns for "a new prize" in Tegeingl. "A lover in Ovid's fashion", the poet prays God to be mindful of him when dying. He then evokes the white wave one more time.

Saluting "the chief of enchanters", the poet announces his intention of praising those women of Wales "who rule my word-craft". He names them one by one, with a few words of description: Gwenlliant, "summer's glow"; Gweirfyl, "my gift, my grace, never won"; Gwladus, "shy girlish child-bride"; Lleucu, whose "mate will not laugh when hard-pressed"; Nest, "fair as an apple-blossom"; Perweur, "centre of my sin"; Generys, "who cured not my lust"; Hunydd, "concern till doomsday"; and Hawis, "my choice for courtship". He counts up the number of the eight he "had", concluding with the comment that it would be best for him to bite his tongue.

== Date and nature of the "Gorhoffedd" ==
Though the "Gorhoffedd" had previously been treated, in the original manuscripts and by later scholars, as two poems, the Celticist John Lloyd-Jones argued in 1948 that it was in fact "a fusion of two distinct and independent poems, one in praise of country and the other a forthright love poem". This view has been supported by Thomas J. Clancy, Tony Conran and Gwyn Jones, but is not held by Oliver Padel or Michaela Jaques The "Gorhoffedd", or the first of the two poems comprising it, can be dated by internal evidence to the period between 1140 and 1167, and was evidently written in Scotland, perhaps while Hywel was on a diplomatic mission to Dumbarton.

== Metre ==
The "Gorhoffedd" is an awdl, a long poem in the traditional metres making use of a sequence of monorhymes. In the first section (or poem) the metre is mostly cyhydedd naw ban, which typically uses lines of nine syllables with four stresses to the line. In the second section (or poem) the metre varies between byr a thoddaid (couplets of ten and six syllables) and cyhydedd fer (couplets of eight syllables per line). One monorhyme is used for lines 1 to 27, a second for lines 28 to 42, a third for lines 43 to 67, and a fourth for lines 68 to 83.

== Genre, analogues and influences ==
It can be argued that if the second half of the "Gorhoffedd" is a poem in praise of women, then it should be placed among the rhieingerddi or maiden-songs written by the court bards of this period. However, the manuscripts themselves, in giving it the entire work the title we know it by, connect it with the only other poem so named, the "Gorhoffedd" of Hywel's contemporary, Gwalchmai ap Meilyr. The word gorhoffedd can be translated as "boast", "vaunt", "exultant utterance" or "celebration". These two gorhoffeddau, and others now lost, were perhaps intended to be recited at royal feasts as a relaxation after the more formal praise-poems had been delivered. Hywel and Gwalchmai both explore the poet's love of nature, of women, and of homeland, and his pride in his own military valour; the poem darts from one of these themes to another, rapidly and without order. However, Hywel's gorhoffedd is more focussed than Gwalchmai's, concentrating more on aspects of the poet's love of his country with fewer turnings away toward praise of its prince, Owain Gwynedd, patron to both poets. It also has, in Gwyn Williams' words, "much more gaiety and delight and less of boasting and of battle", Love of one's own country – its natural beauty, its men and women – can also be found in early Irish poems, especially "Colum Cille's Greeting to Ireland". Boasting is a feature of poems by two other Welsh bards of the time, Cynddelw and Prydydd y Moch, and by various European poets, such works being called vanti in Italy, gaps in Provence, and gabs in northern France. It has been argued that Hywel's "Gorhoffedd", with its references to nightingales and to love for other men's wives, shows the influence of Provençal troubadour poetry, though the mid 12th century would be a rather early date for any such influence to appear. On the other hand the nightingale reference might derive from Ovid, whom Hywel names in this poem, or from elsewhere in the tradition of Latin secular poetry. Oliver Padel has argued that a mention of the legendary bard Myrddin in Hywel's "Gorhoffedd" displays the influence, direct or indirect, of Geoffrey of Monmouth's Vita Merlini, though this claim has been contested by John Bollard.

== Settings ==
A traditional setting of Hywel's "Gorhoffedd", collected in Edward Jones's The Bardic Museum (1802), was arranged by Joseph Haydn in 1804 with a piano, violin and cello accompaniment. Haydn's arrangement was published in George Thomson's Select Collection of Original Welsh Airs (1809–1817). The Irish composer Shaun Davey set lines from Gwyn Williams' translation of the poem on his 1983 album The Pilgrim.

== Translations and paraphrases ==
=== The first poem or section ===
- Clancy, Joseph P. (1970). The Earliest Welsh Poetry. London: Macmillan. pp. 131–132. ISBN 978-0-333-10959-5. Complete translation.
- Conran, Anthony; Williams, J. E. Caerwyn, eds. (1967). The Penguin Book of Welsh Verse. Harmondsworth: Penguin. pp. 108–110. ISBN 978-0-14-042096-8. Complete translation.
- Davies, J. Glyn (1912–1913). "The Welsh bard and the poetry of external nature from Llywarch Hen to Dafydd ab Gwilym". The Transactions of the Honourable Society of Cymmrodorion: 98–99. Abridged translation.
- Ford, Patrick K., ed. (1999). The Celtic Poets: Songs and Tales from Early Ireland and Wales. Belmont, Mass.: Ford & Bailie. pp. 208–210. ISBN 978-0-926689-05-3. Complete translation.
- Gurney, Robert, ed. (1969). Bardic Heritage. London: Chatto & Windus. pp. 39–40. ISBN 0-7011-1328-6. Complete translation.
- Lloyd, D. M., in Lloyd, D. M.; Lloyd, E. M., eds. (1953). A Book of Wales. London: Collins. pp. 72–73. Abridged translation.
- Meirion (September 1797). "The poetry of Hywel ab Owain". The Monthly Magazine. 4 (22): 185–186. Complete translation.
- Price, Thomas, in Williams, Jane, ed. (1854). The Literary Remains of the Rev. Thomas Price, Carnhuanawc. Volume 1. Llandovery: William Rees. pp. 327–328. Abridged translation.
- Rhŷs, Ernest (1892–1893). "Welsh bards and English reviewers". Transactions of the Honourable Society of Cymmrodorion: 43. Abridged translation.
- Roush, G. Jon (1960). The Shape of the Harp: Translations and Poems. Amherst, MA: Amherst College Press. pp. 20–21. Complete translation.
- Stephens, Thomas (1849). The Literature of the Kymry, Being a Critical Essay on the History of the Language and Literature of Wales (1st ed.). Llandovery: William Rees. pp. 51–53. Complete translation.
  - Revised in his The Literature of the Kymry, Being a Critical Essay on the History of the Language and Literature of Wales (2nd ed.). London: Longmans, Green. 1876. pp. 42–44. Complete translation.
- Williams, Gwyn (1953). An Introduction to Welsh Poetry from the Beginnings to the Sixteenth Century. London: Faber and Faber. p. 82. Abridged translation.
  - Revised in his Welsh Poems: Sixth Century to 1600. Berkeley: University of California Press. 1974 [1973]. pp. 36–37. ISBN 978-0-520-02603-2. Complete translation.
  - Further revised in his To Look for a Word. Llandysul: Gomer Press. 1976. pp. 32–33. ISBN 0-85088-356-3. Complete translation.

=== The second poem or section ===
- Clancy, Joseph P. (1970). The Earliest Welsh Poetry. London: Macmillan. pp. 133–134. ISBN 978-0-333-10959-5. Complete translation.
- Ford, Patrick K., ed. (1999). The Celtic Poets: Songs and Tales from Early Ireland and Wales. Belmont, Mass.: Ford & Bailie. pp. 210–211. ISBN 978-0-926689-05-3. Complete translation.
- Gurney, Robert, ed. (1969). Bardic Heritage. London: Chatto & Windus. pp. 40–41. ISBN 0-7011-1328-6. Complete translation.
- Meirion (September 1797). "The poetry of Hywel ab Owain". The Monthly Magazine. 4 (22): 186. Complete translation.
- Roush, G. Jon (1960). The Shape of the Harp: Translations and Poems. Amherst, MA: Amherst College Press. pp. 21–22. Complete translation.
- Stephens, Thomas (1849). The Literature of the Kymry, Being a Critical Essay on the History of the Language and Literature of Wales (1st ed.). Llandovery: William Rees. pp. 53–55. Complete translation.
  - Revised in his The Literature of the Kymry, Being a Critical Essay on the History of the Language and Literature of Wales (2nd ed.). London: Longmans, Green. 1876. pp. 44–46. Complete translation.
- Williams, Gwyn (1953). An Introduction to Welsh Poetry from the Beginnings to the Sixteenth Century. London: Faber and Faber. p. 83. Abridged translation.
  - Revised in his Welsh Poems: Sixth Century to 1600. Berkeley: University of California Press. 1974 [1973]. pp. 37–38. ISBN 978-0-520-02603-2. Complete translation.
  - Further revised in his To Look for a Word. Llandysul: Gomer Press. 1976. pp. 33–34. ISBN 0-85088-356-3. Complete translation.
