= R. Geraint Gruffydd =

Welsh scholar (1928–2015)

Robert Geraint Gruffydd FLSW FBA (9 June 1928 – 24 March 2015) was a scholar of Welsh language and literature. From 1970 to 1979, he was Professor of Welsh Language and Literature at the University of Wales, Aberystwyth, and was made Emeritus Professor in 1993.

== Early life ==
Gruffydd was born on 9 June 1928 in Tal-y-bont, Ardudwy, Wales. He was a graduate of Bangor University and Jesus College, Oxford. He commenced his studies at Oxford in 1948.

== Career ==
During his academic career he held three notable offices:

- Chair of Welsh Language and Literature at the University of Wales, Aberystwyth (1970–1979)
- Librarian of the National Library of Wales (1980–1985)
- Director of the Centre for Advanced Welsh and Celtic Studies (1985–1993)

After his academic retirement in 1993 he was President of the International Congress of Celtic Studies until 2003 and he also served as vice-president of University of Wales, Aberystwyth. In 1999 he succeeded Professor J. E. Caerwyn Williams as Consultant Editor of Geiriadur Prifysgol Cymru, the leading Welsh dictionary.

He wrote books and chapters on a wide range on subjects in all periods of Welsh literature, from his treatment of the earliest Welsh poetry through the work of the medieval poet, Dafydd ap Gwilym, and the Methodist hymn-writer, William Williams Pantycelyn, to 20th-century writers such as Saunders Lewis.

== Personal life ==
Gruffydd's father, Moses Griffith, was the first Treasurer of Plaid Cymru.

He was a friend of Sheldon Vanauken at Oxford, and was mentioned in Vanauken's memoir A Severe Mercy.

== Honours ==
Gruffydd was elected a Fellow of the British Academy (FBA) in 1991. He was a Founding Fellow of the Learned Society of Wales.

== Works ==
- 'In that gentile country. . . ': The beginnings of Puritan nonconformity in Wales (1976)
- Revival and its Fruit (1981)
- (editor), Bardos (1982)
- Llenyddiaeth y Cymru: Cyflwyniad Darluniadol 2 (1989)
- William Morgan: Dyneiddiwr (Henry Lewis Memorial Lecture) (1989)
- Y Ffordd Gadarn: Ysgrifau ar Lên a Chrefydd, ed. E. Wyn James (2008)
- Y Gair a'r Ysbryd: Ysgrifau ar Biwritaniaeth a Methodistiaeth, ed. E. Wyn James (2019)

A full bibliography of his publications to 1995 by Huw Walters is included in Beirdd a Thywysogion, ed. B. F. Roberts & M. E. Owen (1996). A full bibliography by Huw Walters of his publications from 1996 to 2015 is included in Y Gair a'r Ysbryd: Ysgrifau ar Biwritaniaeth a Methodistiaeth, ed. E. Wyn James (2019),

As an editor of medieval Welsh poetry texts, he was general editor of the Cyfres Beirdd y Tywysogion series and has contributed to various volumes in that series and in the Cyfres Beirdd yr Uchelwyr series. These include:

- Gwaith Meilyr Brydydd a'i ddisgynyddion (1994)
- Gwaith Llywelyn Fardd I ac eraill o feirdd y Ddeuddegfed Ganrif (1995)
- Gwaith Dafydd Benfras ac eraill o feirdd hanner cyntaf y Drydedd Ganrif ar Ddeg (1995)
- Gwaith Bleddyn Fardd ac Eraill (1996)

Academic offices
Preceded by David Jenkins	Librarian of the National Library of Wales; 1980–1985	Succeeded by Brynley F. Roberts
