= Mab Darogan =

Messianic figure of Welsh legend

Y Mab Darogan (pronounced [ə mɑːb daˈrɔɡan] meaning "The Destined/prophesied Son" or "Son of Destiny") is a messianic figure of Welsh legend, destined to force the English out of Britain and reclaim it for its Brythonic inhabitants. A number of figures have been called Y Mab Darogan in history (other titles include Y Gŵr Darogan and Y Daroganwr)). An extensive corpus of medieval Welsh prophetic verse, beginning with Armes Prydain (thought to date to the 10th century), is centred on the figure of Y Mab Darogan.

== Historical figures ==
=== Arthur ===
Some later poetry associated Y Mab Darogan with the legendary King Arthur. Arthur was often seen as a protector figure who defended the Britons against all manner of threats. He is specifically indicated as fighting the Saxons in the 9th-century text Historia Brittonum and in works based on it. However, Arthur does not appear in the Armes Prydain and other early prophetic works.

=== Llywelyn the Great and Llywelyn the Last ===
An awdl by Dafydd Benfras hails 'Llywelyn' as y daroganwr ("son of the prophecy"; Y Mab Darogan). The poem is difficult to date and may be addressed to either Llywelyn ab Iorwerth (Llywelyn the Great) or his grandson Llywelyn ap Gruffudd (Llywelyn the Last); it is accepted with some hesitation as being an ode to Llywelyn ab Iorwerth by the most recent editor in the series Beirdd y Tywysogion, but it is noted that it might well be addressed to Llywelyn ap Gruffudd (Dafydd Benfras is associated with both). At the end of the ode, which praises Llywelyn as 'king of the Welsh' (brenin y Cymry), the poet declaims "Whatever is prophesied about you, you shall take / From every prophetic song you shall be blessed / That which I have prophesied, you shall possess / Whatever I should prophesy, you shall uphold / You are the son of the prophecy in the eyes of all whom you see (about you)!'

Another awdl to Llywelyn the Great by Llywarch ap Llywelyn (Prydydd y Moch) declares that he is the prince who will "fulfill the ancient prophecies".

=== Owain Lawgoch ===
In the mid-14th century the mantle of the Mab Darogan passed to Owain Lawgoch (Owain ap Tomas ap Rhodri, 1330–1378), a descendant of the princes of Gwynedd exiled in France. It was in this period that a large body of popular prophetic verse about Y Mab Darogan began to circulate, often referring to him as "Owain". Many of these poems are difficult to date and often appear in variant versions suggesting adaptation over a period of time within the oral poetic tradition. It is therefore unclear in most cases whether "Owain" refers to Owain Lawgoch or Owain Glyndŵr or even some other, future hero. A poem attributed to Rhys Fardd refers to 'Owain' and 'fighting in Calais'. Another, attributed to Y Bergam, seems to refer to Owain Lawgoch in the lines "And there is a man in France eager for battle / who will avenge his father with a whole army."

Gruffudd ap Maredudd ap Dafydd (fl. 1352–1382) composed an awdl which urges Owain to return from France to liberate Wales and conquer England. Another prophecy addressed to Owain Lawgoch is attributed to Iolo Goch but not recognised as his work. A poem by an anonymous poet, written after the murder of Owain in France by an English agent, suggests that many Welshmen were expecting him and that steeds and arms had been prepared for his coming: "Watching the beaches in (our) youth, // Buying swift steeds... // And arms ready for battle. / But then coldness came upon us, / Though we looked for Rhodri's grandson. / We lamented when he came not: / He was slain, killed by a dastard."

The epithet llawgoch itself may be significant. It can be understood literally ('red hand') and is a suitable adjective to describe a heroic warrior, but attention has been drawn to evidence from medieval Ireland which suggests that a red mark on the hand was regarded as a messianic symbol, e.g. in the case of Cathal Crobderg ('Red Hand'), king of Connacht (d. 1224).

=== Roger Mortimer, 4th Earl of March ===
A descendant of Gwladus Ddu.

=== Owain Glyndŵr ===
Owain Glyndŵr was a prince descended from the Kings of Powys who led a revolt against English rule in Wales between 1400 and 1415. His forces even pushed into England and came close to achieving his goal of Welsh independence. He was called Y Mab Darogan in his own day but was ultimately defeated and subsequently disappeared.

=== Henry VII ===
In the lead-up to the Welshman Henry Tudor's seizing the throne of England by defeating and slaying Richard III at Bosworth Field in 1485, his supporters and the poets of Wales claimed him as Y Mab Darogan, a move that won the future king many supporters in Wales. He landed in southwest Wales and marched through the country to gather recruits on his way to Bosworth. His reign over England was believed by some to be the fulfilment of the prophecy; a belief that he actively encouraged by naming his firstborn son Arthur Tudor.

Prince Arthur came of age as Prince of Wales in 1501 and, after marrying, governed the Principality from its de facto capital at Ludlow and reversed some of the most oppressive laws established in Wales at the defeat of Owain Glyndwr. However, he died only one year later. His younger brother, Henry, succeeded his father as King Henry VIII: like his father, Henry VIII used the red dragon as a supporter to his royal arms. Henry VIII enacted the Laws in Wales Acts of 1536 and 1543 by which the legal system in Wales was united with that of the Kingdom of England, and Wales was given parliamentary representation and equality under the law. Henry abolished the feudal marcher lordships which hitherto had ruled much of southern and western Wales and the medieval laws applying there.

== Modern usage ==
Adam Price, former leader of Plaid Cymru, was once named Y Mab Darogan by supporters.
