= Hendregadredd Manuscript =

14th century Welsh manuscript

Hendregadredd Manuscript Llawysgrif Hendregadredd
- Aberystwyth, NLW MS 6680B
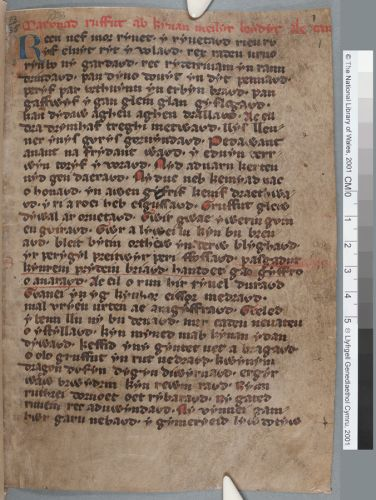
- Facsimile of folio 1^{r}
- Date: shortly after 1283
- Place of origin: probably Strata Florida Abbey
- Language: Middle Welsh
- Scribe(s): Anonymous hand α; 39 others
- Author(s): Meilyr Brydydd, Gwalchmai ap Meilyr, Cynddelw Brydydd Mawr, Llywarch ap Llywelyn, Dafydd Benfras, and others
- Material: Vellum
- Size: 210 × 155 mm; 130 leaves
- Condition: Leaves missing; no original binding
- Script: Textura
- Contents: Medieval Welsh court poetry of the Gogynfeirdd; later hands add poetry of the Cywyddwyr, including a probable autograph of Dafydd ap Gwilym
- Previously kept: In a cupboard in Hendregadredd
- Discovered: 1910

The Hendregadredd Manuscript (Welsh: Llawysgrif Hendregadredd), is a medieval Welsh manuscript containing an anthology of the poetry of the "Poets of the Princes" (Gogynfeirdd); it was written between 1282 and 1350.

The manuscript was long part of the library at Hengwrt, assembled by the antiquary Robert Vaughan (d.1667). A catalogue of the library made in the early 1800s failed to find the manuscript, it having likely been taken in 1778 by the Anglican priest and scholar Richard Thomas (1753–80), who is notorious for removing important medieval manuscripts from libraries and not returning them.

The manuscript then disappeared for over a century. It was unexpectedly rediscovered in 1910 in a cupboard in a disused bedroom of the mansion of Hendregadredd near Porthmadog: a note found inside, written by the Archdeacon of Merioneth, Richard Newcombe (1779-1857), stated "I have long been in possession of this Welsh MS. but forget where or how I obtained it". It is now part of the collection of the National Library of Wales with catalogue number NLW MS 6680B.

The manuscript is the earliest witness of the works of the Gogynfeirdd, the Welsh court poets who were active from the early 12th century until the 14th century. The manuscript is the major source of their work, together with the Red Book of Hergest.

The Hendregadredd Manuscript was probably written at the Cistercian abbey of Strata Florida in Ceredigion. Work began on this collection of poetry sometime after 1282, first by one main scribe (hand α), followed by other 19 scribes (hands A-S). In the first half of the fourteenth century, untrained scribes (hands a-t) added a number of poems, largely contemporary. These include a poem possibly in the hand of Dafydd ap Gwilym himself, the best-known poet of his time, who seems to have been closely associated with Strata Florida, as well as poems by Meilyr Brydydd, Gwalchmai ap Meilyr, Bleddyn Fardd, Cynddelw Brydydd Mawr, Gwynfardd Brycheiniog, Llywarch ap Llywelyn, and Hywel ab Owain Gwynedd.

Parts of the Hendregadredd Manuscript were copied in 1617 by the scholar John Davies of Mallwyd, and it was his transcription that was used in the Myvyrian Archaiology.. Thus, the materials in the manuscript were known before its rediscovery in 1912.
