= Peryf ap Cedifor =

Welsh court poet

Peryf ap Cedifor (fl. c. 1170) was a Welsh court poet. Little his known about him; he is predominantly known for having been a foster-brother of Hywel ab Owain Gwynedd. Only three of his poems survive, though scholarship has disagreed on the number of poems at hand.

== Context of his Poetry ==
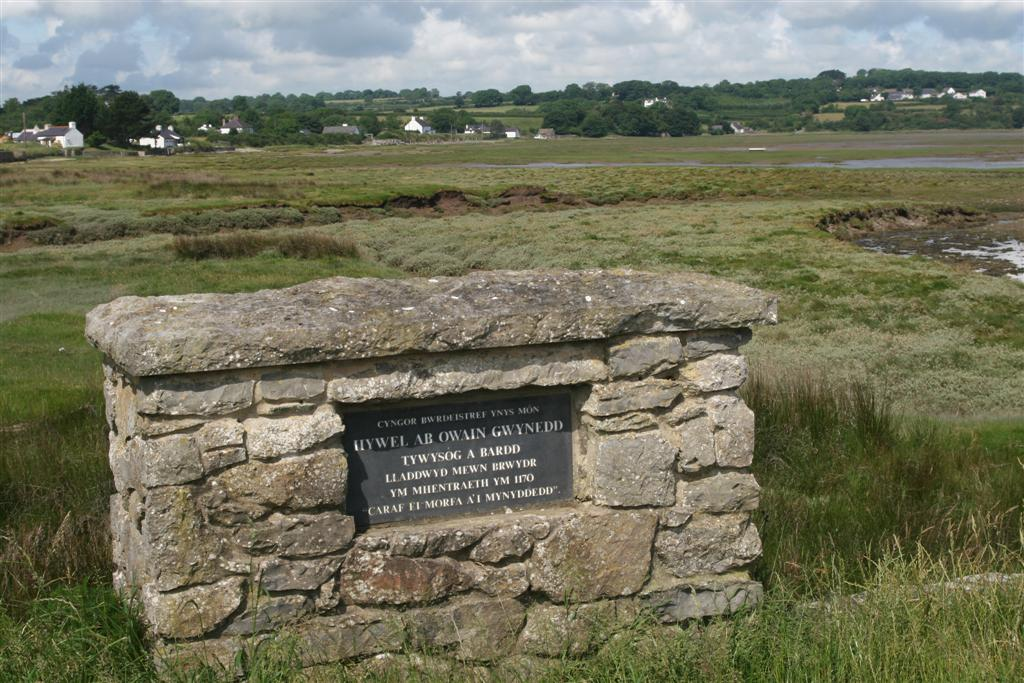
Monument commemorating the death of Hywel ab Owain Gwynedd on the shore at Pentraeth, Anglesey

Little is known about Peryf, except for what emerges in the three elegies attributed to him. The elegies are in honour of his brothers and his foster-brother, Hywel ab Owain Gwynedd, and must have been composed soon after their deaths, in 1170 or 1171. At the time of his death, Hywel had succeeded his father Owain as King of Gwynedd. His death and the death of Peryf's brothers occurred in relation to a coup staged by Cristin ferch Goronwy, second wife of Owain Gwynedd, and her sons Dafydd and Rhodri, to usurp Hywel's position. After returning from gathering an army in Ireland, Hywel was caught by surprise at Pentraeth, and he and a number of his foster-brothers (Peryf's biological brothers) were killed by Dafydd's forces.

Peryf and six of his brother fought at Pentraeth: they are explicitly named in his poetry as Caradog, Brochfael, Iddon, Aearddur, Rhirid and Addaf. The reference to there having been seven of them fighting appears in one of the surviving elegies attributed to Peryf, where only three of them are said to have survived:

Tra fuam yn saith, trisaith––ni'n beiddai,
Ni'n ciliai cyn ein llaith,
Nid oes, ysywaeth, o'r saith
Namyn tri trin ddiolaith.

While we were seven, not thrice seven would defy us,
Would rout us before our death:
Left, alas, of the seven
Are but three who shun not strife.

There was also an eighth brother named Ithael who had died at an earlier date, fighting for Owain Gwynedd at Rhuddlan: his elegy was sung by Cynddelw Brydydd Mawr, who at the time was in Owain Gwynedd's service as court poet.

== Metre, composition and attribution ==
Peryf's surviving corpus of poetry is only in englyn metre, varying between Englyn Unodl Union, Englyn Proest, and Englyn Cyrch. The poems survived are edited with the following titles:

- Marwnad Meibion Cedifor, Elegy of the sons of Cedifor.
- Marwnad Caradog fab Cedifor, Elegy of Caradog son of Cedifor.
- Marwnad Hywel ab Owain, Elegy of Hywel ab Owain Gwynedd.

Only the elegy of Hywel ab Owain Gwynedd presents a title in the manuscript, and thus a certain attribution; the remaining two poems have been attributed to Peryf on the basis of their similarity in style. Ifor Williams considered the elegy to the sons of Cedifor and the elegy to Caradog ap Cedifor to be the same poem.

However, Morfydd E. Owen has argued for a division between the two, on the basis of their metre and of their manuscript context.

The oldest manuscript witnesses to these poems are the late-fourteenth-century Hendregadredd Manuscript, containing the elegies to the sons of Cedifor and to Caradog ap Cedifor, and the early-seventeenth-century Liber B, copied by John Davies of Mallwyd and containing the elegy to Hywel ab Owain Gwynedd.

== Bibliography ==
- Bramley, Kathleen Ann; Jones, Nerys Ann; Owen, Morfydd E.; McKenna, Catherine; Williams, Gruffudd Aled; Caerwyn Williams, J. E. (1994). Gwaith Llywelyn Fardd I ac Eraill o Feirdd y Ddeuddegfed Ganrif. [The work of Llywelyn Fardd I and other poets from the twelfth century] (in Welsh). Cardiff: University of Wales Press.
- Clancy, Joseph (2003). Medieval Welsh Poems. Four Courts Press
- Davies, R. R. (1991). The Age of Conquest: Wales 1063-1415. Oxford: Oxford University Press.
- Jones, Nerys Ann; Parry Owen, Ann (1995). Gwaith Cynddelw Brydydd Mawr. [The work of Cynddelw Brydydd Mawr, vol. II] (in Welsh). Cardiff: University of Wales Press.
- Lloyd, D. Myrddin (1959), 'Peryf ap Cedifor Wyddel', in Dictionary of Welsh Biography, retrieved on the 11th August 2026; https://biography.wales/article/s-PERY-APC-1170.html
- Smith, J. Beverley (2009). "Hywel ab Owain Gwynedd a Gwleidyddiaeth Gwynedd" [Hywel ab Owain Gwynedd and the Politics of Gwynedd]. In Jones, Nerys Ann (ed.). Hywel ab Owain Gwynedd: Bardd-Dywysog [Hywel ab Owain Gwynedd: Poet-Prince] (in Welsh). Cardiff: University of Wales Press. pp. 61–87.
- Williams, Ifor (1923), ‘Marwnad Hywel ab Owain Gwynedd’, in Anglesey Antiquarian Society and Field Club Transactions, pp. 49–58.
