= Richard Newcombe =

Richard Newcombe may refer to:

- Richard Newcome (1701–1769) or Newcombe, English bishop of Llandaff and bishop of St Asaph
- Richard S. Newcombe (born 1950), founder and chairman of Creators Syndicate
- Richard Newcombe (priest) (1779–1857), Anglican priest
