= Fardd =

Fardd is a Welsh epithet (a mutated form of 'bardd', the Welsh word for 'poet') which is positioned after a personal name in a bardic nom-de-plume:

- Bleddyn Fardd (c. 1258–1284), Welsh-language court poet
- Myrddin Fardd (1836–1921), Welsh writer
