= Gwalchmai (disambiguation) =

Gwalchmai or Gwalchmei is a figure in Welsh Arthurian legend known in English as Gawain.

Gwalchmai may also refer to:

- Gwalchmai, Anglesey, a village in Anglesey, north Wales
- Gwalchmai ap Meilyr (12th century), Welsh court poet
- C.P.D. Gwalchmai, an association football team from Gwalchmai, Anglesey
