= Meilyr ap Gwalchmai =

Meilyr ap Gwalchmai (fl. second half of the 12th century) was the son of the Welsh poet Gwalchmai ap Meilyr (fl. 1130–1180) and brother of another poet, Einion ap Gwalchmai. His surviving work is religious in nature.

== Bibliography ==
- J. E. Caerwyn-Williams (ed.), Gwaith Meilyr Brydydd a'i ddisgynyddion (Cardiff, 1994). ISBN 978-0-7083-1187-5
