= Einion ap Gwalchmai =

13th-century Welsh court poet

The Welsh court poet Einion ap Gwalchmai (fl. 1202–1223) was the son of the poet Gwalchmai ap Meilyr and brother of the poet Meilyr ap Gwalchmai. He lived in Gwynedd. Some lines of a praise poem to Llywelyn ab Iorwerth, Prince of Gwynedd, have survived, together with three impressive religious awdlau (odes).

Amser Mai, maith dydd, neud rhydd rhoddi,
Neud coed nad ceithiw, ceinlliw celli.
Neud llafar adar, neud gwâr gweilgi,
Neud gwaeddgreg gwaneg gwynt yn edwi,
Neud erfai ddoniau goddau gweddi,
Neud argel dawel, nid mau dewi.

== Bibliography ==
- J.E. Caerwyn-Williams (ed.), Gwaith Meilyr Brydydd a'i ddisgynyddion (Cardiff, 1994). ISBN 0-7083-1187-3
