= Cynddelw Brydydd Mawr =

12th-century Welsh poet

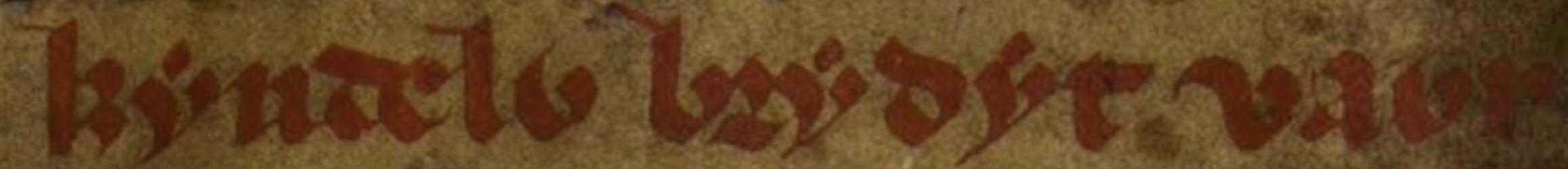
- Cynddelw's name (kẏndelỼ bꝛẏdẏt vaỼr) as appears in the rubrication to his elegy to Owain Gwynedd, NLW MS 6680B f. 36^{r}
- Born: Cynddelw ap Trahaearn Llanfihangel-yng-Ngwynfa, Mechain, Powys
- Died: c. 1195
- Resting place: ?Strata Marcella, Mechain, Southern Powys
- Occupation: Bard
- Language: Middle Welsh
- Period: Gogynfeirdd
- Genres: Panegyric; hymns; love poetry; elegy; satire
- Literary movement: Poets of the Princes
- Years active: c. 1155 – c. 1195
- Children: Dygynnelw ap Cynddelw; Llywarch ap Cynddelw

Academic work
- Notable students: Llywarch Brydydd y Moch

Cynddelw Brydydd Mawr ap Trahaearn (Welsh pronunciation: [ˈkənðɛlu ˈbrədɨ̞ð 'mau̯r ap tra'heɨ̯.arn], fl. c. 1155 – 1195) was the court poet of Owain Cyfeiliog, Madog ap Maredudd, Owain Gwynedd, Hywel ab Owain Gwynedd, Rhys ap Gruffudd, and Llywelyn ab Iorwerth. He was the most prominent Welsh poet of the 12th century, noted for his archaising and bombastic style and proud conservatism. He was also likely the teacher of Prydydd y Moch, one of the most important Welsh poets of the thirteenth century.

== Life ==
Cynddelw's date of birth is unknown, but a pair of lines in his marwysgafn (death-bed poem) may refer to the name of his home parish:

Mi, Gynddelw geiniad, rhad a'm rhodded,
Mihangel a'm gwyr a'm gwrthfynned!

Translation:

I am Cynddelw the singer, grace has been given me:
Let Michael, who knows me, welcome me.

As Cynddelw began his career in Powys, this suggests he was born in Llanfihangel-yng-Ngwynfa, then a part of the cantref of Mechain in the Kingdom of Powys.

== Works cited ==
- Jones, Nerys Ann; Parry Owen, Ann, eds. (1991). Gwaith Cynddelw Brydydd Mawr (in Welsh). Vol. 1. Cardiff: University of Wales Press. ISBN 9780708310861.
