= Marwysgafn =

Welsh term for "deathbed song"

Marwysgafn is a Welsh term meaning a "deathbed song". Used by poets when they sense they are close to death, the poet confesses and asks for forgiveness. Marwysgafns were primarily popular during the Poets of the Princes period.
