= John Lloyd-Jones =

British writer (1885–1956)

John Lloyd-Jones (14 October 1885 – 1 February 1956) was the first Professor of Welsh at the National University of Ireland, Dublin, working in Dublin for over 40 years. In addition to his scholarly publications, Lloyd-Jones was also a prize-winning poet.

== Life ==
Lloyd-Jones was born on 14 October 1885 and studied at the schools in Dolwyddelan and Llanrwst, Wales, before winning a scholarship to the University College of North Wales, Bangor, in 1902. He obtained a degree in Welsh in 1906, studying under Sir John Morris-Jones. He then became a research student at Jesus College, Oxford in 1907 for the postgraduate BLitt. He later studied Irish at the University of Freiburg with Rudolf Thurneysen and then was appointed as the first professor of Welsh at the National University of Ireland, Dublin. In his obituary in The Times, it was said of him that he became "a sort of unofficial ambassador from Wales to Ireland". He was external examiner in Welsh for the University of Wales from 1916 until his retirement in 1955.

He won a prize at the National Eisteddfod in Caernarfon in 1921 for a work on the places names of Caernarfonshire, which was published in 1928 as Enwau lleoedd sir Gaernarfon. This was the first modern scholarly study of its kind. In 1922, he won the Chair for his poem on the subject of winter. He was an expert on the Welsh language found in ancient sources, publishing a Vocabulary of Early Welsh Poetry in eight parts. In 1948, the British Academy asked him to deliver the lecture in memory of Sir John Rhys, and his topic was "The Court Poets of the Welsh Princes". He was awarded an honorary doctorate of literature by the University of Wales in 1948. He retired from his professorship in September 1955 and died in Dolwyddelan at the age of 70.
