= Medieval Welsh literature =

Welsh-language literature in the Middle Ages

Medieval Welsh literature is the literature written in the Welsh language during the Middle Ages. This includes material starting from the 5th century AD, when Welsh was in the process of becoming distinct from Common Brittonic, and continuing to the works of the 16th century.

The Welsh language became distinct from other dialects of Old British sometime between AD 400 and 700; the earliest surviving literature in Welsh is poetry dating from this period. The poetic tradition represented in the work of "Y Cynfeirdd" ('the early poets'), as they are known, then survives for over a thousand years to the work of the Poets of the Nobility in the 16th century.

The core tradition was praise poetry; and the poet Taliesin was regarded as the first in the line. The other aspect of the tradition was the professionalism of the poets and their reliance on patronage from kings, princes and nobles for their living, similar to the way Irish bards and Norse skalds were patronized for the production of complex, often highly alliterative forms of verse. The fall of the Kingdom of Gwynedd and the loss of Welsh independence in any form in 1282 proved a crisis in the tradition, but one that was eventually overcome. It led to the innovation of the development of the cywydd meter, a looser definition of praise, and a reliance on the nobility for patronage.

The professionalism of the poetic tradition was sustained by a Guild of Poets, or Order of Bards, with its own "rule book" emphasising the making of poetry as a craft. Under its rules poets undertook an apprenticeship of nine years to become fully qualified. The rules also set out the payment a poet could expect for his work. These payments varied according to how long a poet had been in training and also the demand for poetry at particular times during the year.

Alongside the court poet, kings, princes and nobles patronised an official storyteller (Welsh: cyfarwydd). Like poets, the storytellers were also professionals; but unlike the poets, little of their work has survived. What has survived are literary creations based on native Welsh tales which would have been told by the storytellers. The bulk of this material is found in the collection known today as the Mabinogion. Medieval Welsh prose was not confined to the story tradition but also included a large body of both religious and practical works, in addition to a large amount translated from other languages.

== Welsh poetry before 1100 ==
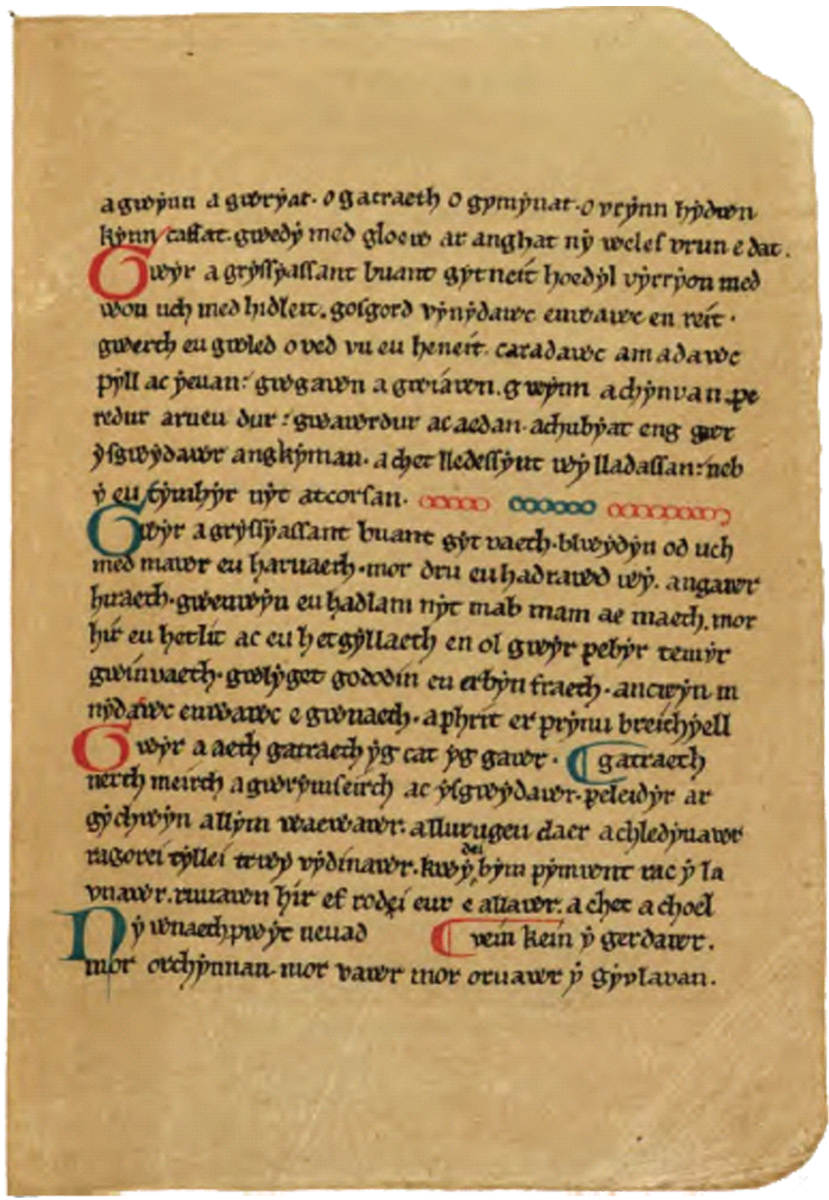
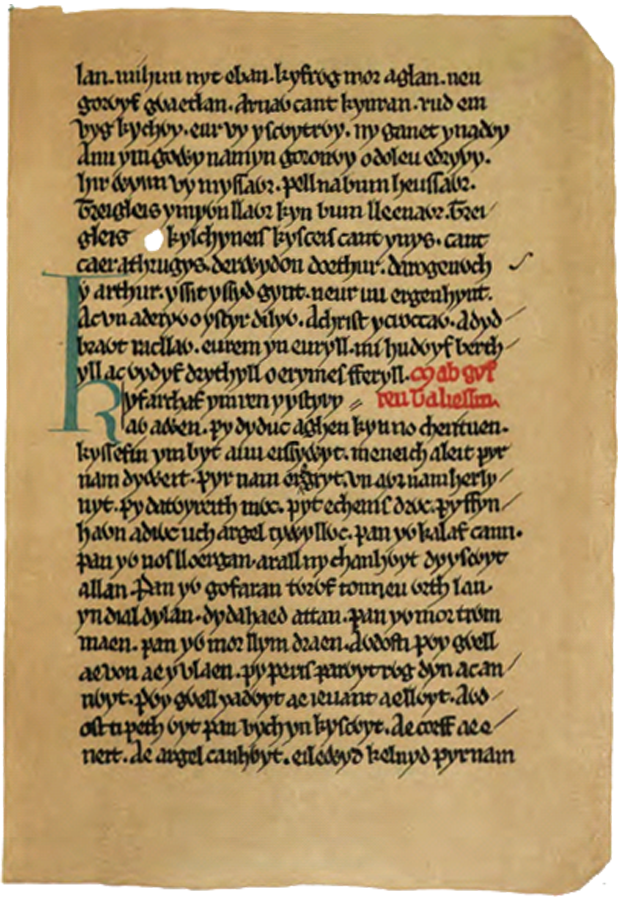
The works of two of the earliest poets are recorded in the Book of Aneirin and the Book of Taliesin in the thirteenth and fourteenth centuries.

In Welsh literature the period before 1100 is known as the period of Y Cynfeirdd ("The Early Poets") or Yr Hengerdd ("The Old Poetry"). It roughly dates from the birth of the Welsh language until the arrival of the Normans in Wales towards the end of the 11th century.

The oldest Welsh literature does not belong to the territory we know as Wales today, but rather to northern England and southern Scotland (collectively Yr Hen Ogledd), and so could be classified as being composed in Cumbric, a Brythonic dialect closely related to Old Welsh. Though it is dated to the 6th, 7th, and 8th centuries it has survived only in 13th- and 14th-century manuscript copies. Some of these early poets' names are known from the 9th-century Historia Brittonum, traditionally ascribed to the historian Nennius. The Historia lists the famous poets from the time of King Ida, AD 547–559:

"At that time, Talhaiarn Tataguen was famed for poetry, and Neirin, and Taliesin, and Bluchbard, and Cian, who is called Guenith Guaut, were all famous at the same time in British (that is, Brythonic or Welsh) poetry."

Of the poets named here it is believed that works that can be identified as Aneirin's and Taliesin's have survived.

=== Taliesin ===
The poetry of Taliesin has been preserved in a 14th-century manuscript known as Llyfr Taliesin (Book of Taliesin). This manuscript contains a large body of later mystical poetry attributed to the poet, but scholars have recognised twelve poems that belong to the 6th century. They are all poems of praise: one for Cynan Garwyn, king of Powys about 580; two for Gwallawg, king of Elmet, a kingdom based around the modern Leeds; and nine other poems associated with Urien Rheged, a ruler of the kingdom of Rheged, located around the Solway Firth, and his son, Owain.

Taliesin's verses in praise of Urien and Owain became models for later poets, who turned to him for inspiration as they praised their own patrons in terms that he had used for his.

=== Aneirin ===
Aneirin, a near-contemporary of Taliesin, wrote a series of poems to create one long poem called Y Gododdin. It records the Battle of Catraeth, fought between the Britons of the kingdom of Gododdin (centred on Eidyn, the modern Edinburgh) and the Saxon kingdoms of Deira and Bernicia in the north east of England. This battle was fought at Catterick in about the year 598. It has survived in Llyfr Aneirin (The Book of Aneirin), a manuscript dating from c. 1265.

=== Llywarch Hen and Heledd ===
The poetry associated with Llywarch Hen, Canu Llywarch Hen and with Heledd, Canu Heledd, dates from a somewhat later period: the whole of Canu Heledd is generally thought to be from the 9th century; while the earliest parts of Canu Llywarch are probably also 9th century, other parts of the cycle may be as late as the 11th or 12th century. These poems, in the form of monologues, express the sorrow and affliction felt at the loss of the eastern portion of the Kingdom of Powys (present day Shropshire) to the English, but they are also works where nature is an important element in the background, reflecting the main action and feelings of the poetry itself.

=== Other early poetry ===
Though the Anglo-Saxon invaders seem to break Welsh hearts in most of the early poetry, there are some poems of encouragement and the hope of an eventual and decisive defeat that would drive them back into the sea. One such poem is the 10th-century Armes Prydein from the Book of Taliesin which sees a coalition of Irish, British, and Scandinavian forces defeating the English and restoring Britain to the Welsh.

This period also produced religious poetry, such as the englynion in praise of the Trinity found in the 9th-century Juvencus Manuscript (Cambridge MS Ff. 4.42), which is now at Cambridge University Library. In the Book of Taliesin we find a 9th-century poem Edmyg Dinbych (In Praise of Tenby, a town in Pembrokeshire), probably produced by a court poet in Dyfed to celebrate the New Year (Welsh: Calan). The book also includes important poems which were probably not composed by Taliesin, including the Armes Prydein (The Great Prophecy of Britain) and Preiddeu Annwfn, (The Spoils of Annwn), and the Book of Aneirin has preserved an early Welsh nursery rhyme, Peis Dinogat (Dinogad's Smock). Much of the nature poetry, gnomic poetry, prophetic poetry, and religious poetry in the Black Book of Carmarthen and the Red Book of Hergest is also believed to date from this period.

== Welsh poetry, 1100–1600 ==
From c. 1100 to 1600 Welsh poetry can be divided roughly into two distinct periods: the period of the Poets of the Princes who worked before the loss of Welsh independence in 1282, and the Poets of the Nobility who worked from 1282 until the period of the English incorporation of Wales in the 16th century.

=== Poets of the Princes (c. 1100 – c. 1300) ===
In Welsh this period is known as Beirdd y Tywysogion (Poets of the Princes) or Y Gogynfeirdd (The Less Early Poets). The main source for the poetry of the 12th and 13th centuries is the Hendregadredd manuscript, an anthology of court poetry brought together at the Cistercian Strata Florida Abbey from about 1282 until 1350.

The poets of this period were professionals who worked in the various princely courts in Wales. They were members of a Guild of poets whose rights and responsibilities were enshrined in native Welsh law; and as such, they worked within a developed literary culture and with inflexible traditions. Bardic families were still common—the poet Meilyr Brydydd had a poet son and at least two poet grandsons—but it was becoming more and more usual for the craft of poetry to be taught formally, in bardic schools which might only be run by the pencerdd (chief musician). The pencerdd was the top of his profession, and a special chair was set aside for him in the court, in an honoured position next to the heir. When he performed he was expected to sing twice: once in honour of God, and once in honour of the king. The bardd teulu (household poet) was one of the 24 officers of the court and he was responsible for singing for the military retinue before going into battle, and for the queen in the privacy of her chamber. The lowest ranking poets were the cerddorion (musicians).

The poetry praises the military prowess of the prince in a language that is deliberately antiquarian and obscure, echoing the earlier praise poetry tradition of Taliesin. There is also some religious poems and poetry in praise of women.

With the death of the last native prince of Wales in 1282, the tradition gradually disappears. In fact, Gruffudd ab yr Ynad Coch's (fl. 1277–83) elegy on the death of Llywelyn ap Gruffudd, is one of the most notable poems of the era. Other prominent poets of this period include:

- Meilyr Brydydd, fl. c. 1100–1137; the earliest of the Gogynfeirdd
- Bleddyn Fardd, fl. c. 1258–1284;
- Cynddelw Brydydd Mawr; fl. c. 1155–1200;
- Dafydd Benfras, fl. c. 1220–58; and
- Llywarch ap Llywelyn (also known as Prydydd y Moch (English: "Pigs' Poet")), fl. 1174/5-1220.

A rather different poet of this period was Hywel ab Owain Gwynedd (d. 1170) who as the son of Prince Owain Gwynedd, was not a professional poet.

=== Poets of the Nobility, or Cywyddwyr (c. 1300 – c. 1600) ===
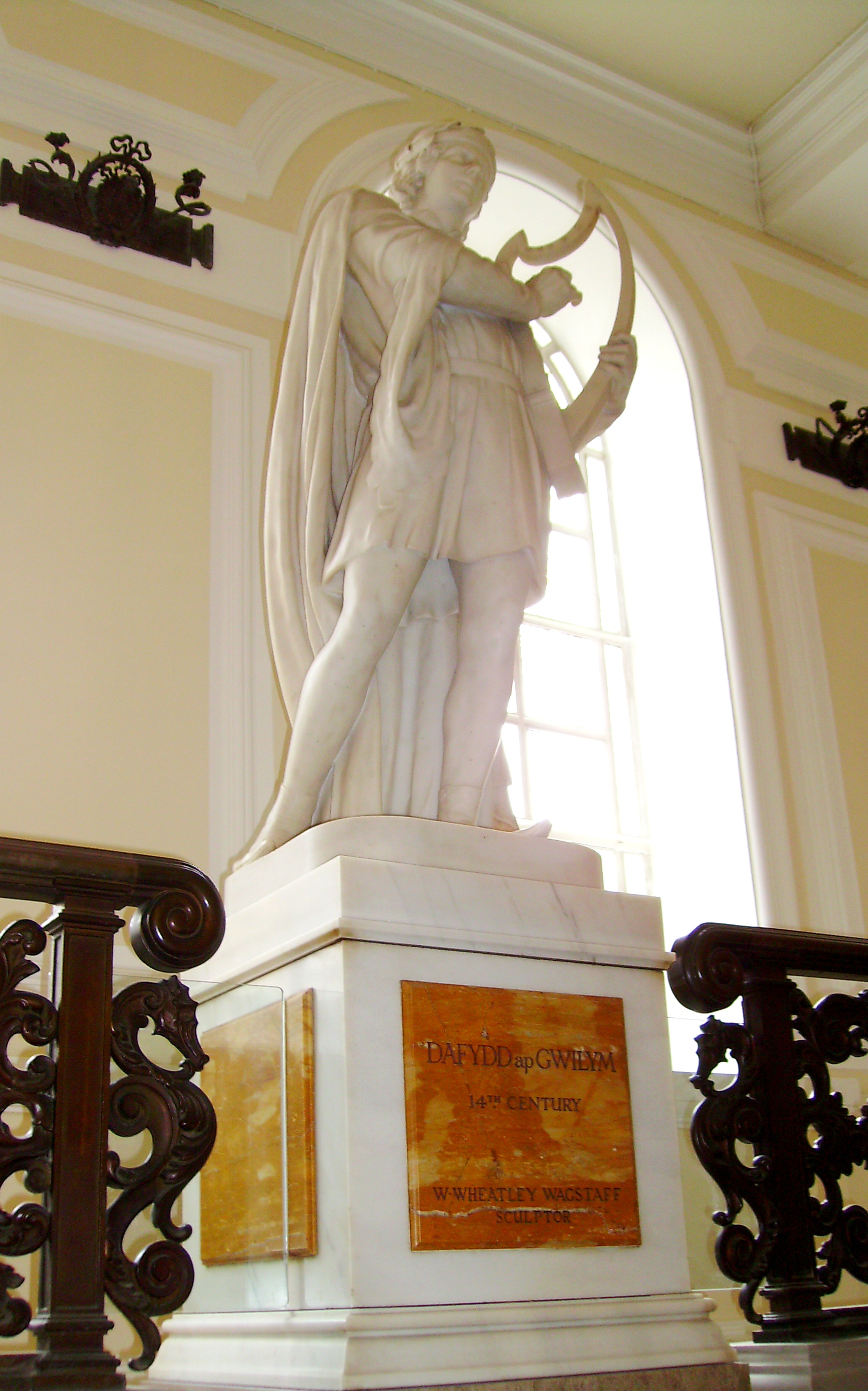
William Wheatley Wagstaff's sculpture of Dafydd ap Gwilym at Cardiff City Hall

The poetic tradition thrived in Wales as long as there were patrons available to welcome its practitioners. Until 1282, Wales consisted of a number of 'kingdoms', each with its own independent ruler; this ensured that there was no shortage of courts available to the travelling professional poet or "bard". After 1282 the poetic tradition survived by turning to the land-owning nobility to act as patrons, and these included some Norman lords who had successfully integrated themselves with the Welsh.

Much of the poetry of this period is praise poetry, in praise of the patron and his family, his ancestors, his house and his generosity; and the cywydd is the most popular poetic metre used. Because of the popularity of the cywydd, this period is also known as the period of the Cywyddwyr (poets who wrote using the cywydd metre). The poetry was very often sung to the accompaniment of the harp. Though praise was the main matter of poetry, satire (Welsh: dychan) also thrived. The poets organised themselves into a Guild to protect their professional status, and from time to time their rules were revised and updated. Perhaps the most important such revisions were those concerning patronage and poetic rank made at the Caerwys eisteddfod of 1523. The work of numerous poets of this period survives; some are anonymous, but very many are identified. Here are a few of the most prominent and influential of these:

==== Dafydd ap Gwilym (c. 1315/20 – c. 1350/1370) ====
Wales's greatest poet worked during the period of the Poets of the Nobility. He is known for such poems as "The Girls of Llanbadarn", "Trouble at a Tavern", "The Wind" and "The Seagull". For more information about his life and work, see Dafydd ap Gwilym.

==== Iolo Goch (c. 1325 – c. 1398) ====
From the Vale of Clwyd, Iolo Goch (English: "Red Iolo") bridged between the periods of the Poets of the Princes and Poets of the Nobility. Early in his career he composed in the former tradition, but he was among the first to sing the praises of the nobles and others using the cywydd. One of his main patrons was Ithel ap Robert, archdeacon of St Asaph. Perhaps his most famous work is a cywydd in praise of Owain Glyndŵr's home at Sycharth.

==== Siôn Cent (c. 1400 – 1430/45) ====
Traditionally associated with Breconshire, Siôn Cent is most famous for using his poetry in the service of his Christian beliefs, and standing outside the tradition of praise of patron. He uses the cywydd for his work, to attack the sins of this world. Perhaps his most famous poem is I wagedd ac oferedd y byd (English: "[In praise of] the vanity and dissipation of the world"). He turns his back on the praise of nobles, which he sees as flattery and falsehood, and sets his eyes on the blessedness of heaven.

==== Guto'r Glyn (c. 1435 – c. 1493) ====
Guto'r Glyn is associated with Glyn Ceiriog, Denbighshire, where many of his patrons lived. He also wrote poems for other patrons in the four corners of Wales whose houses he visited on his journeys. He was a master of the praise tradition in poetry. Guto was also a soldier who fought on the Yorkist side during the War of the Roses, but spent his last years as a lay guest at the Cistercian abbey of Valle Crucis, near Llangollen (a short distance from Glyn Ceiriog).

==== Dafydd Nanmor (fl. 1450 – 1490) ====
Dafydd Nanmor, born at Nanmor (or Nantmor), Gwynedd, is one of the most significant poets of this period. It is said that he was exiled to south Wales for overstepping the mark in his poetry and spent the rest of his life outside Gwynedd. The 20th-century critic Saunders Lewis saw particular significance in his work. Lewis saw him as a poet of philosophy who praised the ideal ruler as he praised his patrons who saw that within the Welsh tradition all who had privilege and power also had responsibilities towards family, community and nation.

==== Tudur Aled (c. 1465 – c. 1525) ====
Tudur Aled was himself a nobleman and one of the greatest of the Poets of the Nobility. Born in Llansannan, Denbighshire, his most important patrons were the Salisbury family of Dyffryn Clwyd. He was one of the instigators of the Caerwys eisteddfod of 1523. In his final illness he took the habit of the Order of St. Francis and died in Carmarthen, where he was buried in the Brothers' Court. At his death the elegies his fellow poets wrote in his memory attested to his greatness as a poet. He was renowned as a praise poet of both secular and religious noblemen, and also reflects the changes at the beginning of the 16th century which were threatening the future of the bardic system.

==== Gruffudd Hiraethog (d. 1564) ====
A native of Llangollen, Gruffudd Hiraethog was one of the foremost poets of the 16th century to use the cywydd. Though he was a member of the medieval guild of poets and a notable upholder of that tradition, he was also closely associated with William Salesbury, Wales' leading Renaissance scholar. In fact one of the first Welsh literature to be published in print was Gruffudd's collection of proverbs in 1547, Oll synnwyr pen Kembero ygyd (Modern Welsh spelling: Holl synnwyr pen Cymro i gyd; English:"All the wisdom of a Welshman's head (collected) together").

=== Other voices in poetry 1300–1600 ===
Not all of the poetry which survives from this period belongs to the tradition of the praise poetry of the nobility. Some groups of poets and genres of poetry stood completely outside that tradition. Women seem to be totally excluded from the Welsh poetic guild, or Order of bards. But we do know that some women did master the Welsh poetic craft and wrote poetry at this time, but only the work of one woman has survived in significant numbers, that of Gwerful Mechain.

The prophetic poetry (Welsh: canu brud) was a means of reacting to and commenting upon political situations and happenings. This poetry is intentionally ambiguous and difficult to understand. But at its heart it prophesies victory for the Welsh over their enemies, the English. This poetry looked towards a man of destiny who would free them from their oppressors. With the victory of the 'Welshman' Henry VII in 1485 at the battle of Bosworth the poets believed that the prophecies had been fulfilled and the tradition comes to an end. Satire poetry (Welsh: canu dychan) was part of the 'official' poets' repertoire and sparingly used within the praise tradition to chastise a miserly patron. But it was in private poetic bouts with fellow poets that the satire tradition flourished.

== Welsh prose ==
It is believed that the earliest written Welsh is a marginal note of some sixty-four words in Llyfr Teilo (The Book of St. Teilo), a gospel book originating in Llandeilo but now in the library of St. Chad's Cathedral, Lichfield, and also known as the Lichfield Gospels, or, The Book of St. Chad. The marginal note, known from its opening (Latin) word as The Surexit memorandum, dates from the ninth century, or even earlier, and is a record of a legal case over land.

The native Welsh storyteller, known as the cyfarwydd ("the one who knows") was an official of the court. He was expected to know the traditional knowledge and the tales. But the storytelling tradition was basically oral, and only a few remnants suggest the wealth of that tradition. Amongst the most important are Trioedd Ynys Prydain, or the Welsh Triads, a compendium of mnemonics for poets and storytellers. The stories that have survived are literary compositions based on oral tradition.

In the Middle Ages Welsh was used for all sorts of purposes and this is reflected in the type of prose materials that has survived from this period: original material and translations, tales and facts, religious and legal, history and medicine.

=== Native Welsh tales, or, Mabinogion ===
The name Mabinogion is a convenient label for a collection of tales preserved in two manuscripts known as the White Book of Rhydderch and the Red Book of Hergest. They are written in Middle Welsh, the common literary language between the end of the eleventh century and the fourteenth century. They include the four tales that form Pedair Cainc y Mabinogi ("The Four Branches of the Mabinogi"):

- Pwyll prince of Dyfed;
- Branwen daughter of Llŷr;
- Manawydan son of Llŷr;
- Math son of Mathonwy.

Two are native tales embodying traditions about King Arthur:

- Culhwch and Olwen the earliest Arthurian tale in any language;
- The Dream of Rhonabwy.

Two more are native tales embodying traditions about the early history of Britain:

- Lludd and Llefelys;
- The Dream of Maxen.

The final three are the Arthurian Welsh Romances, showing the influence of French poet Chrétien de Troyes:

- Owain, or the Lady of the Fountain, from Yvain, the Knight of the Lion;
- Geraint and Enid, from Erec and Enide;
- Peredur son of Efrog, from Perceval, the Story of the Grail.

=== Native Welsh law ===
Tradition holds that Hywel Dda summoned a conference at Whitland, Carmarthenshire, in about 945. At this conference Welsh law was codified and set down in writing for posterity. Since the earliest manuscripts containing these legal texts date from about two hundred and fifty years after the event they are probably not a record of what was codified there, if such a conference was even convened. In fact, until the annexation of Wales in 1536, native Welsh law grew and developed organically and for that reason many more copies of it have survived than of the native tales.

The use of Welsh for legal texts shows that it had the words and the technical terms with definite and exact meanings needed in such circumstances. It also shows that reading and writing Welsh was not confined to priests and monks, but that there were also lawyers "whose skill is directed not to administrating the law (there were judges for that), but to writing it, to giving it permanence in words, to ordering words and sentences in such a way that what was stated should be quite clear" (Thomas Parry (1955), p. 68).

=== Religious texts ===
The vast majority of Welsh religious texts from the Middle Ages are translations and mostly the works of unknown monks and priests. The works themselves reflect the tastes and fashions of Christendom at the time: apocryphal narratives, dreams or visions, theological treatises and exegesis, and mystical works.

==== Lives of the saints ====
About thirty lives of the saints, both native ones like Beuno, Curig, and Gwenfrewi and the more general such as the Mary, the mother of Jesus, Mary Magdalene, Martin of Tours, and Catherine of Alexandria survive, all translations into Welsh from Latin. Even the lives of the native saints were composed in Latin originally, and that a long time after the saint's actual life and so of little or no interest to those looking for actual historical information. Perhaps the two most important is Buchedd Dewi ("The life of Dewi, or, David") written in Latin by Rhygyfarch in about 1090 and later translated into Welsh, and Buchedd Cadog ("Life of Cadog") written by Lifris of Llancarfan in c. 1100.

=== History texts ===
The Welsh medieval history texts belong to the class of literary creations, but the split into two distinct groups. While the first group, Brut y Tywysogion, tends to stick to historical facts, the second, Brut y Brenhinedd, is the fantastic creation of Geoffrey of Monmouth.

==== Brut y Tywysogion ====
Brut y Tywysogion (Chronicle of the Princes) consists of variant Welsh translations of Latin original annales telling the history of Wales from the seventh century to the death of Llywelyn ap Gruffudd in 1282. It is believed that the original and its translation were produced at the Cistercian Strata Florida Abbey.

==== Brut y Brenhinedd ====
Brut y Brenhinedd (Chronicle of the Kings) is the name given to a number of texts that ultimately trace their origins back to translations of Geoffrey of Monmouth's Historia Regum Britanniae (1136). As such they were key works in shaping how the Welsh thought of themselves and others, tracing their origins back to Brutus of Troy, the mythical founder of Britain. In fact the Welsh word brut is derived from Brutus's name and originally meant "a history of Brutus" and then "a chronicle history".

== See also ==
- List of Welsh-language poets (6th century to c. 1600)

== Sources ==
=== Welsh poetry before 1100 ===
- General
  - Jarman, A. O. H. (1981). The Cynfeirdd : early Welsh poets and poetry. Cardiff: University of Wales Press on behalf of the Welsh Arts Council. ISBN 0-7083-0813-9.
  - Williams, Ifor, Sir (1972). Bromwich, Rachel (ed.). The beginnings of Welsh poetry: studies. Cardiff: University of Wales Press [for] the Language and Literature Committee of the Board of Celtic Studies of the University of Wales. ISBN 0-7083-0035-9.
- Taliesin
  - Taliesin Poems. Translated by Pennar, Meirion. Lampeter: Llanerch. 1988. ISBN 0-947992-24-3.
  - Williams, Ifor (1987). The Poems of Taliesin. Translated by Williams, J. E. Caerwyn. Dublin Institute for Advanced Studies.
  - "Book of Taliesin | The National Library of Wales". www.library.wales. Gives access to colour images of the entire manuscript.
- Aneirin
  - Jarman, A. O. H. (1988). Y Gododdin : Britain's oldest heroic poem. Llandysul: Gomer. ISBN 0-86383-354-3. A translation into English including notes, glossary and bibliography.
  - Koch, John T. (1997). The Gododdin of Aneirin : text and context from Dark-Age North Britain. Cardiff: University of Wales Press. ISBN 0-7083-1374-4.
  - "Llyfr Aneirin | Llyfrgell Genedlaethol Cymru". www.llyfrgell.cymru. Gives access to colour images of the entire manuscript.
- Llywarch Hen and Heledd
  - Ford, P. K. (1974). The poetry of Llywarch Hen : introduction, text and translation. Berkeley: University of California Press. ISBN 0-520-02601-2.
  - Rowland, Jenny (1990). Early Welsh saga poetry : a study and edition of the englynion. D.S. Brewer. ISBN 0-85991-275-2.
- Other early poetry
  - Jackson, Kenneth Hurlstone (1935). Early Welsh Gnomic Poems. Edited by K. Jackson. University of Wales Press Board.
  - Williams, Sir Ifor (1972). Armes Prydein: The Prophecy of Britain from the Book of Taliesin. Translated by Bromwich, Rachel. Dublin Institute for Advanced Studies. ISBN 978-0-901282-56-9.

=== Welsh poetry, 1100–1600 ===
- General
  - McKenna, Catherin A. (1991). The Medieval Welsh religious lyric : poems of the Gogynfeirdd, 1137–1282. Belmont, Mass.: Ford & Bailie. ISBN 0-926689-02-9.
  - Williams, J. E. Caerwyn (1994). The poets of the Welsh Princes. Cardiff: University of Wales Press. ISBN 0-7083-1206-3.
- Poets of the Nobility, or, Cywyddwyr
  - Rowlands, Eurys I., ed. (1976). Poems of the Cywyddwyr: A Selection of Cywyddau, C. 1375-1525. Dublin Institute for Advanced Studies. ISBN 978-1-85500-091-9.
  - Johnston, Dafydd, ed. (1993). Iolo Goch : poems. [Llandysul]: Gomer. ISBN 0-86383-707-7. Translated into English with an introduction.
  - Johnston, Dafydd, ed. (1998). Canu maswedd yr oesoedd canol (Medieval Welsh erotic poetry). Pen-y-bont ar Ogwr [Bridgend]: Seren. ISBN 1-85411-234-1.

=== Welsh prose ===
- Jenkins, Dafydd; Owen, Mofydd E. (1984), The Welsh marginalia in the Lichfield Gospels. Part II: The 'surexit' memorandum, Cambridge Medieval Celtic Studies, vol. 7, pp. 91–120
- Davies, Sioned (1993). Pedeir Keinc Y Mabinogi (The four branches of the Mabinogi). Gomer. ISBN 978-1-85902-005-0.
- Charles-Edwards, T. M. (1989). The Welsh laws. Cardiff: University of Wales Press. ISBN 0-7083-1032-X.
- Jenkins, Dafydd (1986). The Law of Hywel Dda : law texts of medieval Wales. Llandysul, Dyfed: Gomer Press. ISBN 0-86383-277-6.
- Evans, D. Simon (1986). Medieval religious literature. [Cardiff]: University of Wales Press on behalf of the Welsh Arts Council. ISBN 0-7083-0938-0.

=== Welsh religious texts ===
- Cartright, Jane, ed. (2013). Mary Magdalene and her sister Martha : an edition and translation of the medieval Welsh lives. Washington, D.C.: Catholic University of America Press. ISBN 978-0-8132-2188-5.

=== General ===
- Boyd, Matthieu (3 August 2017), "Cynfeirdd", in Rouse, Robert; Echard, Sian; Fulton, Helen; Rector, Geoff (eds.), The Encyclopedia of Medieval Literature in Britain, Oxford, UK: John Wiley & Sons, Ltd, pp. 1–2, doi:10.1002/9781118396957.wbemlb647, ISBN 978-1-118-39695-7
