= Meilyr Brydydd =

Early Welsh poet

Meilyr Brydydd ap Mabon (fl. 1100–1137) is the earliest of the Welsh Poets of the Princes or Y Gogynfeirdd (The Less Early Poets) whose work has survived.

Meilyr was the court poet of Gruffudd ap Cynan (ca. 1055–1137), king of Gwynedd. He composed a notable awdl farwnad (elegy) on the death of his patron and a marwysgafn on his own approaching end, noted for its intensity and depth of feeling. He had a son named Gwalchmai ap Meilyr, and through him he was an ancestor of the poets Einion ap Gwalchmai and Elidir Sais.

== Bibliography ==
- J. E. Caerwyn Williams & Peredur I. Lynch (ed.), Gwaith Meilyr Brydydd a'i Ddisgynyddion, Cyfres Beirdd y Tywysogion I (Cardiff, 1994). ISBN 0-7083-1187-3
