= Hywel ab Owain Gwynedd =

Poet and king of Gwynedd in c. 1170

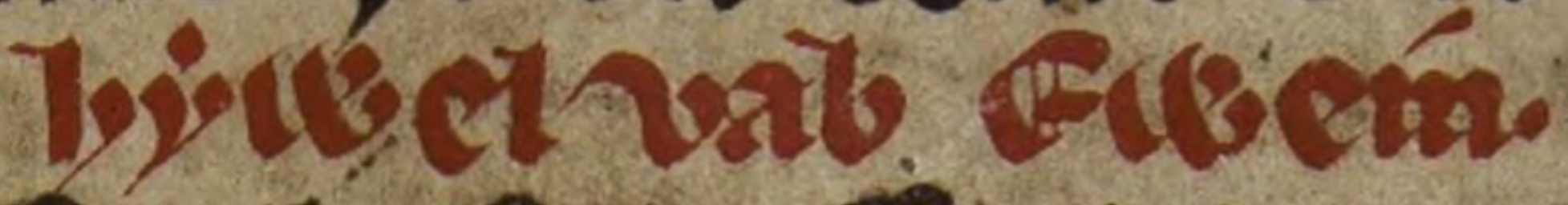
- Hywel's name in the rubric to one of his love-poems in the Hendregadredd Manuscript

King of Gwynedd
- Reign: 23 November 1170 – ?late 1170/?early 1171
- Predecessor: Owain Gwynedd
- Successor: Dafydd ab Owain Gwynedd; Rhodri ab Owain Gwynedd
- Born: c. 1120
- Died: ?1170 or ?1171; Pentraeth, Dindaethwy, Wales
- Issue: Gruffudd ap Hywel
- House: Second Dynasty of Gwynedd
- Father: Owain Gwynedd
- Mother: Ffynod

Hywel ab Owain Gwynedd (c. 1120–1170/1171), was a Welsh poet and King of Gwynedd for a short period after his father's death in 1170. Hywel was the son of Owain Gwynedd, king of Gwynedd and an Irishwoman named Ffynod.

== Biography ==
=== Military campaigns ===
Hywel's father Owain Gwynedd and uncle Cadwaladr came to blows in 1143 when Cadwaladr was implicated in the murder of Prince Anarawd ap Gruffydd of Deheubarth, Owain's ally and future son-in-law, on the eve of Anarawd's wedding to Owain's daughter. (Note: Lloyd's; History of Wales novel, Cadwaladr's betrayal, page 95.) (Note: Warner, Philip; "Famous Welsh Battles", Cadwaladr and Anarawd, page 80.) Owain followed a diplomatic policy of binding other Welsh rulers to Gwynedd through dynastic marriages, and Cadwaladr's border dispute and murder of Anarawd threatened Owain's efforts and credibility. (Note: Warner, Philip "Famous Welsh Battles", Gwenllian, pages 69, 79.)

As ruler of Gwynedd, Owain stripped Cadwaladr of his lands assigning them to Hywel in 1139 and dispatched Hywel to the Kingdom of Ceredigion where he burned Cadwaladr's castle at Aberystwyth, Hywel drove his uncle out in 1143. Cadwaladr fled to Ireland and hired a Norse fleet from Dublin, bringing the fleet to Abermenai to compel Owain to reinstate him. Taking advantage of the brotherly strife, and perhaps with the tacit understanding of Cadwaladr, the marcher lords mounted incursions into Wales. Realizing the wider ramifications of the war before him, Owain came to terms and reconciled, with Cadwaladr restored to his lands in 1144. Hywel and Cadell ap Gruffydd of Deheubarth joined forces against the Normans in West Wales, they took Carmarthen, Llansteffan, and Wiston castles. Peace between the brothers held until 1147 when an unrecorded event occurred which led Owain's sons Hywel and Cynan to drive Cadwaladr out of Meirionnydd and Ceredigion, with Cadwaladr retreating to Môn. Meanwhile Hywel took Llanrhystud capturing Cadwaladr's son Cadfan in 1150. Again an accord was reached, with Cadwaladr retaining Aberffraw until a more serious breach occurred in 1153 when he was forced into exile in England, where his wife was the sister of Gilbert de Clare, 1st Earl of Hertford and the niece of Ranulf de Gernon, 4th Earl of Chester. In 1157 Hywel is with his father, Owain Gwynedd on a campaign against Henry II of England in Basingwerk. Then in 1159, Hywel accompanies a Norman force from Carmarthen castle against Lord Rhys of Deheubarth, and then afterwards, Hywel goes into revolt against Henry II. These actions seemed to be promoted by Owain Gwynedd and also a desire to keep on good terms with the Crown.

=== Heir of Gwynedd ===
In 1146, news reached King Owain Gwynedd that his favoured eldest son and heir, Rhun, died. Owain was overcome with grief, falling into a deep melancholy from which none could console him until news reached him that Mold castle in Tegeingl (Flintshire) had fallen to Gwynedd, "[reminding Owain] that he had still a country for which to live", wrote historian Sir John Edward Lloyd. (Note: Lloyd, J. E.; A History of Wales - Rhun's death, page 96.)

As the eldest son, Hywel succeeded his father in 1170 as King of Gwynedd in accordance with Welsh law and custom. (Note: Lloyd, J. E.; A History of Wales, Hywel's succession and overthrow by Cristin and Dafydd, page 134, Dafydd takes Gwynedd by 1174, page 135, Gwynedd between 1175–1188, page 145.) (Note: Davies, John; A History of Wales, Davies argues that following the death of Hywel ab Owain, Iorwerth, as the eldest son, was the legitimate heir of Hywel ab Owain Gwynedd (page 126), as the next senior surviving son of Owain Gwynedd. After Iorwerth's death, his eldest son Llywelyn ab Iorwerth was the legitimate heir to the Crown and Throne of Gwynedd. With the rule of Gwynedd returning to the senior legitimate line of Aberffraw when Llywelyn defeated Dafydd ab Owain in 1194 (page 135).) He was immediately confronted by a coup instigated by his step-mother Cristin, dowager Princess of Gwynedd. (Note: Cristin was the daughter of Goronwy ab Owain, and was Owain ap Gruffydd's first cousin. The Archbishop of Canterbury excommunicated Owain ap Gruffydd for not putting her away, as well as for disputing the appointed bishop of Bangor.) The dowager princess plotted to have her eldest son Dafydd usurp the throne of Gwynedd from Hywel, and with Gwynedd divided between Dafydd and her other son Rhodri. The speed with which Cristin and her sons acted suggest that the conspiracy may have had roots before Owain's death. Additionally, the complete surprise of the elder sons of Owain suggests that the scheme had been a well kept secret.

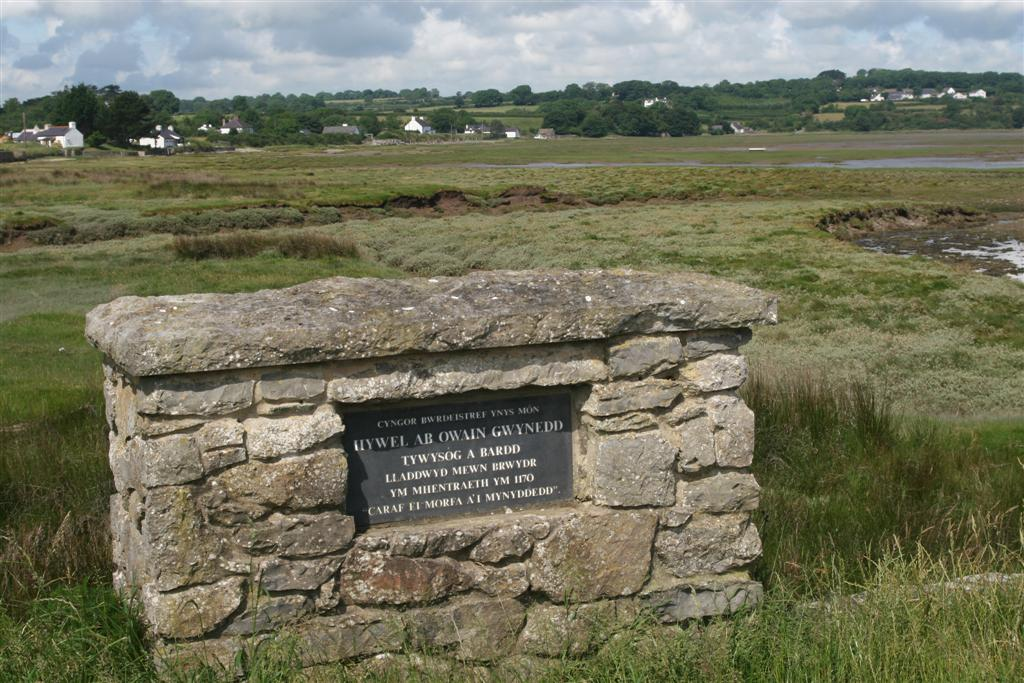
Hywel ab Owain Gwynedd memorial from Pentraeth, Anglesey

Within months of his succession, Hywel was forced to flee to Ireland, returning later that year with a Hiberno-Norse army and landing on Môn, where he may have had Maelgwn's support. It is difficult to date Hywel's death with certainty. His father died in 1170 on the feast of Pope Clement I (23 November), and while the chronicles record his death in the same year, the new year could be reckoned from Lady Day in the twelfth century, so Hywel may have died in what would be considered 1171 today. Dafydd himself landed his army on the island and caught Hywel off guard at Pentraeth, defeating his army and killing Hywel. At least three of Hywel's foster-brother were also killed while fighting with him in this battle. The occasion was commemorated in three poems attributed to one of the foster-brothers, Peryf ap Cedifor:

Tra fuam yn saith, trisaith--ni'n beiddai,
Ni'n ciliai cyn ein llaith,
Nid oes, ysywaeth, o'r saith
Namyn tri trin ddiolaith.

[...]

Meibion Cedifor, cyd ehelaeth- -blant,
Yn y pant uch Pentraeth,
Buant brwysgion, braisg arfaeth,
Buant briw ger eu brawd-faeth.

Translation:

While we were seven, not thrice seven would defy us,
Would rout us before our death:
Left, alas, of the seven
Are but three who shun not strife.

[...]

Cedifor's sons, noble children in union,
In the glen near Pentraeth,
They drank deep, strong of purpose,
Were cut down near their foster-brother.

Following Hywel's death and the defeat of his army, the surviving sons of Owain came to terms with Dafydd. Iorwerth was apportioned the commotes of Arfon and Arllechwedd, with his seat at Dolwyddelan, with Maelgwn retaining Ynys Môn, and with Cynan receiving Meirionnydd. Maelgwn secured himself on Ynys Môn following his father's death, and was strong enough to retain the island following Hywel's defeat by Dafydd. Maelgwn may have also been instrumental in supporting his full brother Iorwerth in keeping Arfon and Aellechwedd, for once Maelgwn was captured Iorwerth escaped into exile in Powys, at his wife's kinsmen's court. (Note: Lloyd suggests that despite some traditions, Iorwerth was in control of Arfon and Nant Conwy at least in 1170, given that he was buried at Penmachno. He may later have been expelled after the partition, as had Cynan, only to be buried at Penmachno.) (Note: Arllechwedd, Cantref is a commote on the west bank of the Conwy river in the modern Conwy local authority area. Noted in Lloyd's History of Wales, pages 235-236.) However, by 1174, Iorwerth and Cynan were both dead and Maelgwn and Rhodri were imprisoned by Dafydd, who was now master over the whole of Gwynedd. (Note: Llywelyn ab Iorwerth was too young to press for his claim, though under Welsh law would have been prince of Gwynedd on the death of his father Iorwerth ab Owain Gwynedd.)

=== Poetry ===
Hywel was an accomplished poet and eight of his poems have been preserved, and are printed in The Myvyrian Archaiology of Wales. The best known is probably Gorhoffedd Hywel ab Owain Gwynedd in which he praises his father's kingdom of Gwynedd, both its natural beauties and its beautiful women. Other poems include the earliest known love poetry in the Welsh language and may show a French influence.

== See also ==
- Hywel ab Owain Gwynedd at Welsh language Wikisource

== Sources ==
- Jones, Nerys Ann (2009). "'Gorhoffedd Hywel ab Owain'" [Hywel ab Owain's Boast]. In Jones, Nerys Ann (ed.). Hywel ab Owain Gwynedd: Bardd-Dywysog [Hywel ab Owain Gwynedd: Poet-Prince] (in Welsh). Cardiff: University of Wales Press. pp. 111–133. ISBN 9780708321621.
- Bartrum, P. C., ed. (1976b). Welsh Genealogies: AD 300-1400. Cardiff: University of Wales Press. doi:10.20391/40837b6f-1887-4afd-9c6e-9b7e3a122693. ISBN 070830561X. Archived from the original on 6 June 2023.
- Bramley, Kathleen Anne; Owen, Morfydd E., eds. (1994). Gwaith Llywelyn Fardd I ac eraill o feirdd y ddeuddegfed ganrif [The work of Llywelyn Fardd I and other poets of the twelfth century]. Cyfres Beirdd y Tywysogion [Series of the Poets of the Princes] (in Welsh). Vol. 2. University of Wales Press. ISBN 9780708312148.
- Davies, John (1994). A History of Wales. Penguin. ISBN 9780140145816.
- Davies, R. R. (1991) [1987]. The Age of Conquest: Wales 1063-1415. Oxford: Oxford University Press. ISBN 0198201982. IA ageofconquestwal0000davi.
- Edwards, Huw Meirion (2009). "Canu Serch Hywel ab Owain Gwynedd" [The Love Poetry of Hywel ab Owain Gwynedd]. In Jones, Nerys Ann (ed.). Hywel ab Owain Gwynedd: Bardd-Dywysog [Hywel ab Owain Gwynedd: Poet-Prince] (in Welsh). Cardiff: University of Wales Press. pp. 88–110. ISBN 9780708321621.
- Jones, Thomas, ed. (1973) [1955]. Brut y Tywysogion, or the Chronicle of the Princes: Red Book of Hergest version (2nd ed.). Cardiff: University of Wales Press. ISBN 0708301045.
- Johnston, Dafydd (2009). "Hywel ab Owain a Beirdd yr Uchelwyr" [Hywel ab Owain and the Poets of the Princes]. In Jones, Nerys Ann (ed.). Hywel ab Owain Gwynedd: Bardd-Dywysog [Hywel ab Owain Gwynedd: Poet-Prince] (in Welsh). Cardiff: University of Wales Press. pp. 134–151. ISBN 9780708321621.
- Lloyd, J. E. (1912). A History of Wales: from the earliest times to the Edwardian conquest. Vol. 2. London: Longmans, Green & Co. IA historyofwalesfr02lloyuoft.
- Lloyd, John (2004) [1911]. A history of Wales: from the Norman invasion to the Edwardian conquest (Reprint ed.). Barnes & Noble. p. 220. ISBN 0760752419.
- Owen, Morfydd E. (2009). "Byd Hywel ab Owain Gwynedd" [The World of Hywel ab Owain Gwynedd]. In Jones, Nerys Ann (ed.). Hywel ab Owain Gwynedd: Bardd-Dywysog [Hywel ab Owain Gwynedd: Poet-Prince] (in Welsh). Cardiff: University of Wales Press. pp. 31–60. ISBN 9780708321621.
- Warner, Philip (6 June 1997). Famous Welsh Battles. Barnes & Noble. ISBN 9780760704660.
- Roderick, Arthur James (1959). "HYWEL ab OWAIN GWYNEDD (died 1170), soldier and poet". Dictionary of Welsh Biography. Aberystwyth: National Library of Wales.
- Smith, J. Beverley (2009). "Hywel ab Owain Gwynedd a Gwleidyddiaeth Gwynedd" [Hywel ab Owain Gwynedd and the Politics of Gwynedd]. In Jones, Nerys Ann (ed.). Hywel ab Owain Gwynedd: Bardd-Dywysog [Hywel ab Owain Gwynedd: Poet-Prince] (in Welsh). Cardiff: University of Wales Press. pp. 61–87. ISBN 9780708321621.

Regnal titles
Preceded by Owain Gwynedd	Kingdom of Gwynedd c. 1170-?1171	Succeeded by Dafydd ab Owain Gwynedd; Rhodri ab Owain Gwynedd
