= Gwalchmai ap Meilyr =

Gwalchmai ap Meilyr (fl. 1130 – 1180) was a Welsh-language court poet, connected with Trewalchmai in Anglesey. He was one of the earliest of the Gogynfeirdd ("less early poets") or Beirdd y Tywysogion ("Poets of the Princes"). He composed poems in praise of Owain Gwynedd, king of Gwynedd, and his brothers. He was the son of another poet, Meilyr Brydydd, and father of the poets Meilyr ap Gwalchmai and Einion ap Gwalchmai. He shares his name with Gwalchmei ap Gwyar, a figure from Welsh legend described as the nephew of Arthur and known in English as Gawain.

His most important work is perhaps Gorhoffedd Gwalchmai ("Gwalchmai's praise poem"), one of the greatest medieval Welsh poems.

== See also ==
Gwalchmai ap Meilyr at Wikisource

== Bibliography ==
- J. E. Caerwyn-Williams (ed.), Gwaith Meilyr Brydydd a'i ddisgynyddion (Cardiff, 1994). ISBN 0-7083-1187-3
