= Richard Newcombe (priest) =

Richard Newcombe (1779 – 1857) was an Anglican priest.

Newcombe was educated at Queens' College, Cambridge. He held incumbencies at Llanrhyddlad, Llanfwrog and Clocaenog.

He died on 7 August 1857.
