= Llywarch ap Llywelyn =

Welsh noble poet of Aberffraw

Llywarch ap Llywelyn (fl. 1173–1220) was an important medieval Welsh poet. He is also known by his bardic name, "Prydydd y Moch" ("poet of the pigs").

Llywarch was a poet at the court of the kingdom of Gwynedd in the reigns of Dafydd ab Owain Gwynedd and Llywelyn ab Iorwerth, and he is known for a number of awdlau in praise of his lord. One of Llywarch's successors in the court of Gwynedd was the poet Dafydd Benfras, who may possibly have been his son.

He was a very nationalistic poet, and his fervent support for Llywelyn's policy of uniting Wales was a prominent element of his poetry.

== Life ==
We have very little information about Llywarch's life apart from the evidence of his poetry. He was most probably from the commote of Is Dulas (the eastern part of the cantref of Rhos, near Llandulas in the Perfeddwlad). In 1334, the survey of the Lordship of Denbigh recorded the gwely (in this case meaning tribal land) of Prydydd y Moch. The poet may have acquired this land by the patronage of Llywelyn. Also recorded is a "mill of Prydydd y Moch", and the poet may have had significant earnings from grinding the corn of local farmers.

His pseudonym Prydydd y Moch can be interpreted in various ways. It might refer to some defiant poetic lines threatening Gruffudd ap Cynan ab Owain Gwynedd, comparing singing to that prince with "casting pearls before swine" (Gospel of Matthew, chapter 7). Another possibility is that the poet was a swineherd, before attaining bardic status in his youth.

== Poetry ==
Nineteen of his awdlau are extant (a total of 1,318 lines), together with 11 series of englynion (462 lines). This body of poetry is second only to the work of Cynddelw Brydydd Mawr. His works celebrate several princes and lords of Gwynedd, as well as princes of Powys, Arwystli, and the Deheubarth. His only known works to sing praise to someone other than his sponsors are his awdl to Gwenllïan ferch Hywel from the cantref of Gwynllŵg, and the 'Awdl yr Haearn Twym' ("awdl of the warm iron").

Llywarch was the court poet for the House of Aberffraw on the isle of Anglesey, and working for Dafydd ab Owain Gwynedd, and for Llywelyn the Great he became chief poet; he wrote nine poems for Llywelyn. The poem Poetry to God is attested to him in the Hendregadredd Manuscript, however both the Red Book of Hergest and The Myvyrian Archaiology of Wales attribute the poem to Cynddelw.
