= Bleddyn Fardd =

Welsh poet

Bleddyn Fardd (fl. c. 1258 – 1284) was a Welsh-language court poet from Gwynedd.

Bleddyn is noted for his elegies on the death of Llywelyn ap Gruffudd, Prince of Wales, the texts of which are preserved in the Hendregadredd manuscript.
