= Dafydd Benfras =

13th-century Welsh court poet

Dafydd Benfras (fl. 1230–1260) was a court poet in the Welsh language, regarded by Saunders Lewis and others as one of the greatest of the Poets of the Princes (Beirdd y Tywysogion).

Dafydd Benfras was a poet of the court of the kingdom of Gwynedd and most of his surviving poems are elegies and praise-poems to its princes. He composed an ode to Llywelyn the Great celebrating his battles and victory over King John of England, and wrote an elegy to Llywelyn's son and successor as prince of Wales, Dafydd ap Llywelyn, on his death in 1246.
