= National Library of Wales General Manuscript Collection =

Coordinates: 52°24′52″N 4°4′8″W

The General Manuscript Collection of the National Library of Wales includes three series of manuscripts: NLW Manuscript series; NLW ex series of Manuscripts; and, NLW Rolls. All manuscripts acquired by the library through either donation or purchase are added to this open-ended series, either singly or in groups, if they are: a) in a format compatible with the collection, i.e. manuscript books or rolls, or unbound material that can be filed; and, b) not integral to an archive or individual collection. There is, however, much archival material, mostly correspondence, held in the General Manuscripts Collection. The holdings in the General Manuscript Collection are catalogued in the Handlist of manuscripts in the National Library of Wales, which focuses on those manuscripts in the National Library which are not part of the foundation collections; there were over fifteen thousand when the first volume of the handlist appeared in 1940, and the collection had increased to 23,233 by 31 March 1994.

== Welsh Law Manuscripts ==
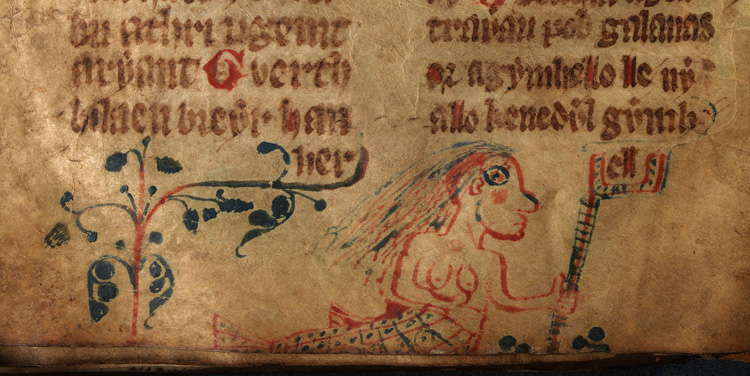
NLW MS 20143, F. 24v. Mermaid

NLW MS 20143, Ancient laws and institutions in Wales “Leges Wallicae Saec 13[sic]”, is a fourteenth-century text of the Welsh Laws, known as Siglum Y. This calf bound volume has the unusual feature of marginalia drawings, mostly religious, including shield, a mermaid, evangelist-symbols and, the crucifixion with the Virgin Mary and John. The Boston Manuscript of the Laws of Hywel Dda is also in the General Manuscript Collection (NLW MS 24029).

== Additional Manuscripts (NLW MSS 1-500) ==
The Additional Manuscripts are those donated to the National Library of Wales by Sir John Williams that are not part of either the Peniarth or Llanstephan collections. These manuscripts are the first five hundred in the General Collection (NLW 1-500), of which 1-446 were catalogued by John Humphreys Davies, Principal of the University College of Wales in Aberystwyth, in Additional manuscripts in the collections of Sir John Williams.

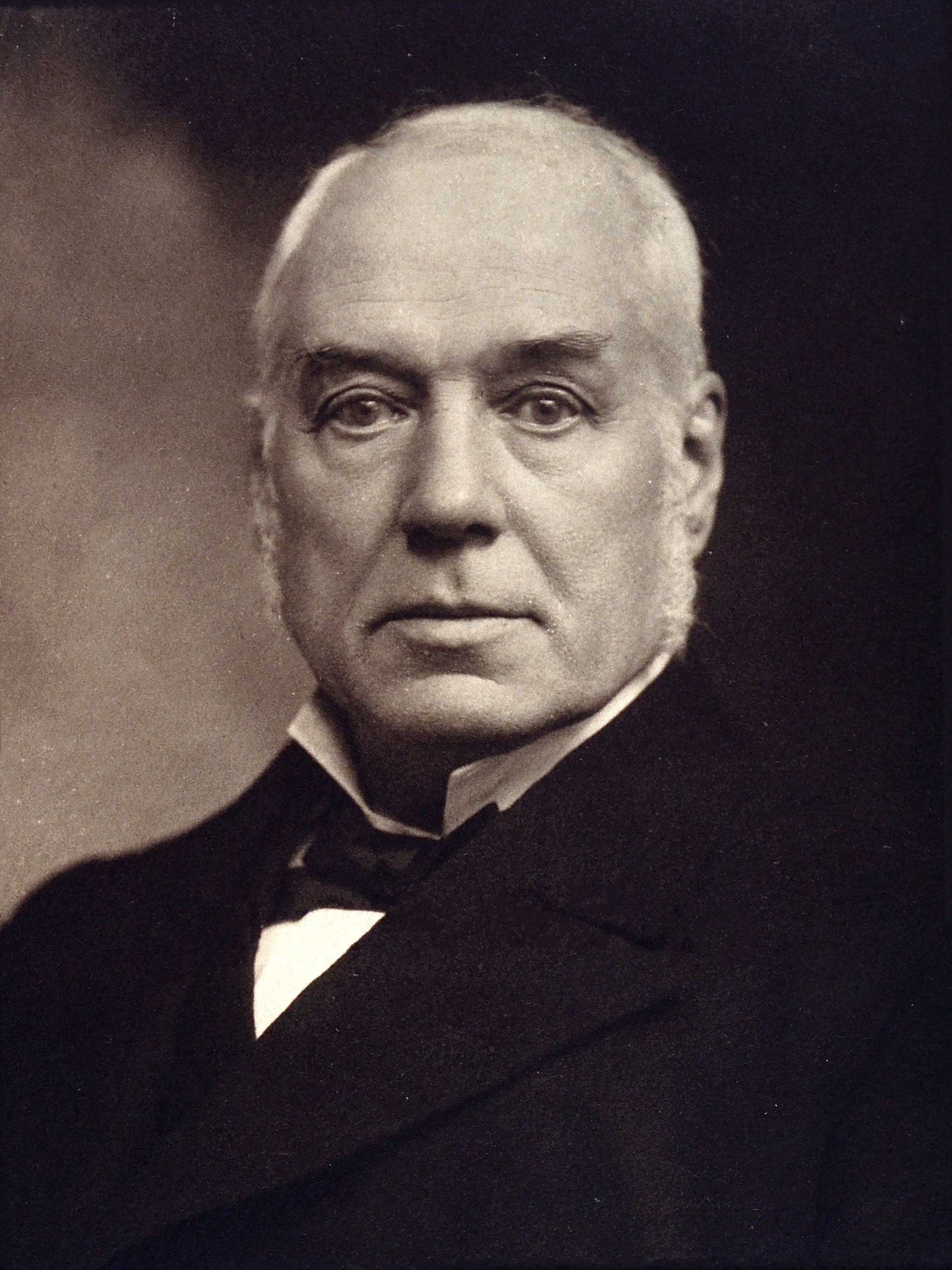
Sir John Williams

A hundred and thirty-seven of the Additional Manuscripts were purchased at the Sir Thomas Phillipps sale in 1895, which Davies described as including some of considerable interest, for instance the letters contained in bound volumes of the papers of Bardd y Brenin, that Sir Thomas had bought. There are also some important manuscripts such as the holograph of George Owen's Treatise on the Lordships Marcher of Wales (NLW MS 10), a collection of notes by Lewis Morris (NLW MS 67), a copy of the journal that Sir Joseph Banks kept of his tour through Wales (NLW MS 147), a copy of the original manuscript of T. F. Dukes's Antiquities of Shropshire, the notebook of Theophilus Jones (NLW MS 235), and a volume of letters to the Welsh Antiquary Edward Lhuyd (NLW MS 309).

Some forty of the manuscripts are from Egerton Phillimore's collection including Irish and Manx manuscripts. Among this group is the volume of poetry written by Thomas Evans in the early seventeenth century (NLW MS 253), which Davies suggests is the smallest Welsh manuscript in existence, measuring 85 x 70 mm. More than fifty manuscripts are the books and papers of Thomas Rees including a holograph of poetry by Vavasor Powel (NLW MS 366), the Register of Mynydd Bach Chapel, Llangyfelach (NLW MS 369), and letters to the managers of the Congregational Fund 1769-1811 (NLW MS 383).

Other groups within the Additional Manuscripts are the collections of Thomas Edwards (NLW MSS 346-354), George Dunn (NLW MS 431-436), and four French manuscripts (NLW MSS 443-446) acquired at the Ashburnham sale in 1899. Notable individual manuscripts are two books of hymns scribed by William Williams (NLW MSS 77-78) and one written by his son Rev. John Williams (NLW MS 269), both of Pantycelyn; holograph copies by nineteenth-century celebrities including Talhaiarn (NLW MS 192) and Ceiriog (NLW MS 307); and, a book of Manx Carols owned by George Borrow (NLW MS 409).

Seven continental liturgical manuscripts (NLW MSS 493-499), including examples of fifteenth-century illumination from Italian, French and Netherlandish schools, were purchased from Sir Edmund Buckley of Plas Dinas Mawddwy in 1912.

== Aberaeron Manuscripts (NLW MSS 609-23) ==
The Aberaeron Manuscripts, which previously belonged to Thomas Davies, Aberaeron, were acquired by the National Library in 1909. They include poems, sermons, accounts and other records of the parish of Ystrad, a roll of members of the Llyfr Cymdeithas Grefyddol society at Llanddewi, Aberarth between 1812 and 1824, and books of the Aberaeron Club, 1795-1849.

== Plas Power (NLW MSS 716-36) ==
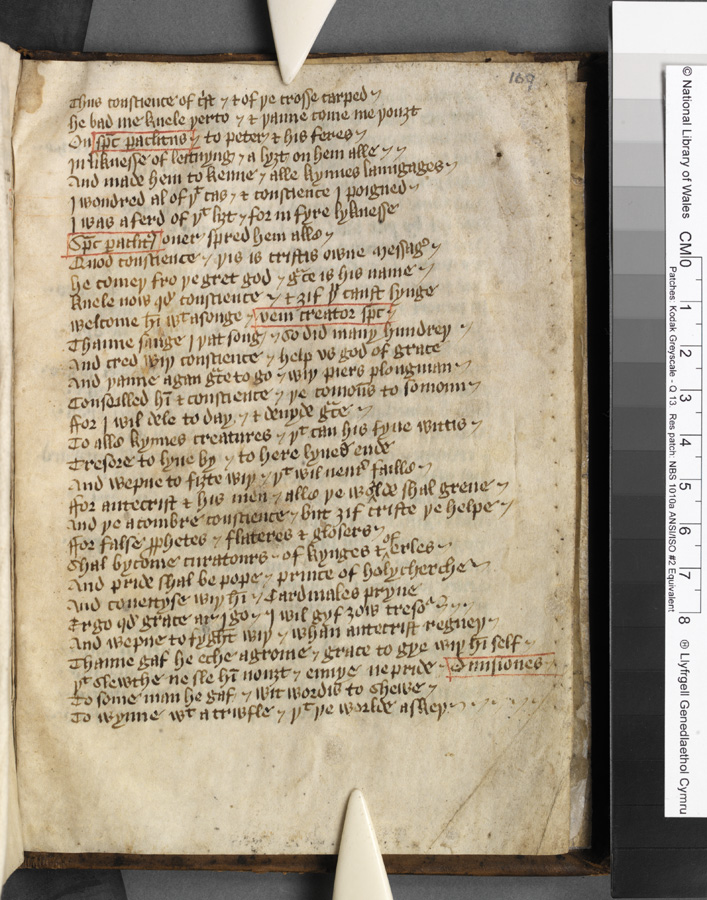
Piers Ploughman. Middle English Poetry (f.169)

The Plas Power collection of manuscripts was formed in the early eighteenth century at the Lloyd family home of Plas Power. The National Library of Wales acquired the collection in 1913. It includes an eleventh-century volume of astronomy, an early fifteenth-century text of Piers Plowman (NLW MS 733B), and collections of Welsh poetry and pedigrees from the sixteenth and seventeenth century.

- NLW MS 733B is a composite volume of Piers Plowman that is connected with groups A and C of the medieval poem.
- NLW MS 735C is an illustrated volume of medieval astronomy texts that were copied c. 1000 to c. 1150. It is the oldest scientific manuscript in the library.

== Ty Coch Manuscripts (NLW MSS 815-68) ==
These manuscripts were part of the Ty Coch Library that was purchased from Edward Humphrey Owen of Ty Coch, Caernarvon in 1910 as the third foundation collection of the National Library of Wales. Although the collection's printed books are its primary feature, it does contain several historical manuscripts relating to Anglesey and Caernarvonshire, and Llyfr Gwyn Mechell (NLW MS 832), a literary collection compiled by William Bulkeley of Brynddu in around 1730.

== Thomas Stephens Manuscripts (NLW MSS 904-66) ==
The manuscripts from the library of Thomas Stephens, a chemist from Merthyr Tydfil, were bequeathed to the National Library by his brother-in-law and four additional volumes enriched the collection on the death his sister in 1939. Stephens was the author of The Literature of the Kymry, an important book in nineteenth-century Wales that was published in 1849. Most of this group of manuscripts are in the hand of Thomas Stephens.

== Henry Owen Manuscripts (NLW MSS 1341-1453) ==
The manuscripts bequeathed to the National Library of Wales by Dr Henry Owen, who was the Treasurer of the National Library from 1907 until his death in 1919, and editor of George Owen of Henllys, the Elizabethan historian of Pembrokeshire, include a collection of the latter's work. Henry Owen acquired two original manuscripts, Pembrock and Kemes (NLW MS 1385) and Fragmentes of Wales ... (NLW MS 1388), by George Owen and there are also a number of transcripts of other his works that were made in the eighteenth and nineteenth centuries.

== Crosswood Manuscripts (NLW MSS 1641-1952) ==
The Crosswood manuscripts, named for their former home in Montgomeryshire, consist of the manuscripts of Gwallter Mechain (MSS. 1641-1812 and 1950-2), Rev. John Jenkins (MSS 1813-86) and Frances Althea Trevor (MSS. 1887-1949). Among these manuscripts is a collection of sermons in Welsh and English, mostly from the eighteenth century but with one example as early as 1682, that usually bear the location and date that they were delivered.

== Panton Manuscripts (NLW MSS 1970-2068) ==
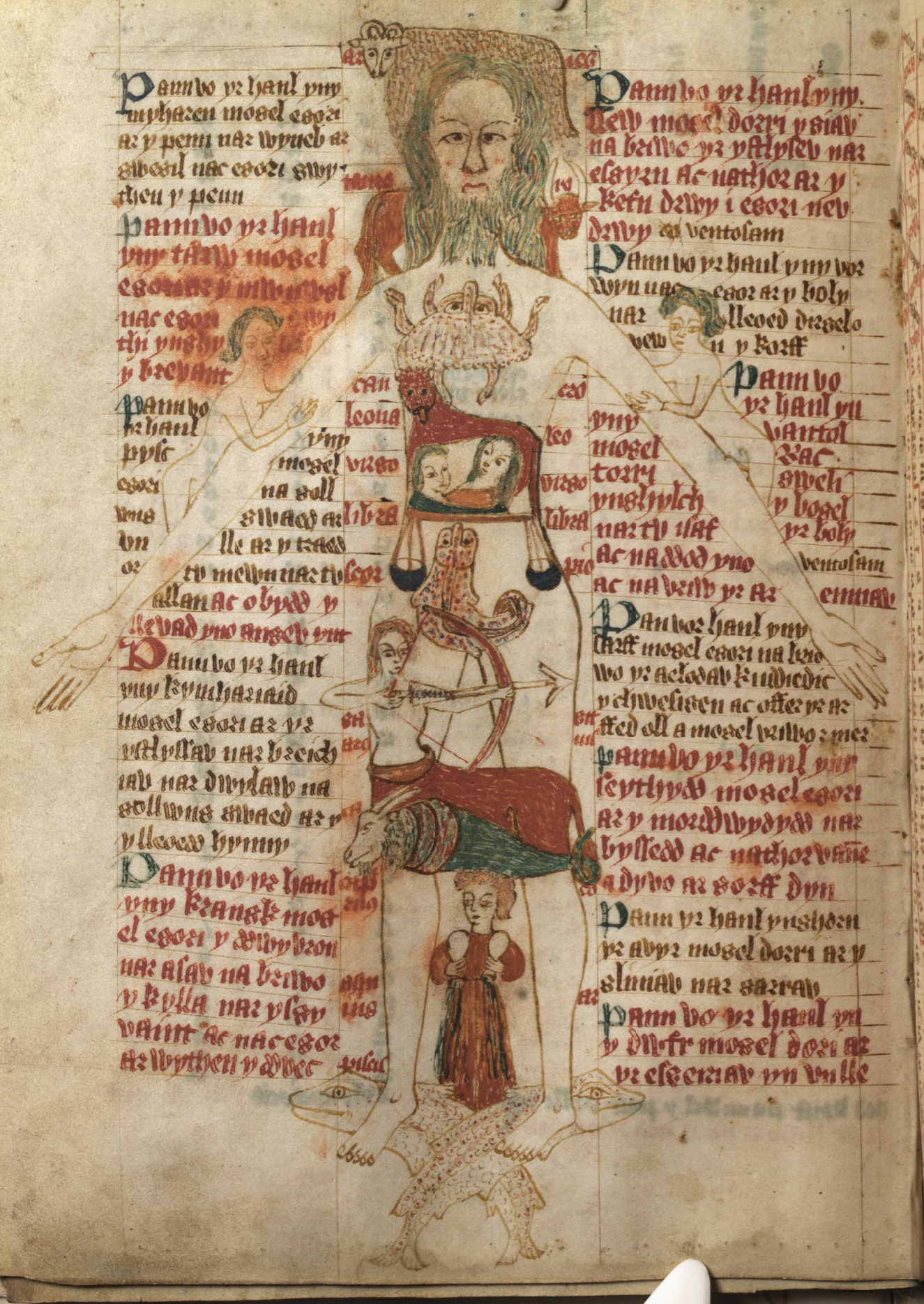
NLW MS 3026 p. 26 'The Zodiac Man', a diagram of a human body and astrological symbols with instructions explaining the importance of astrology from a medical perspective.

The Panton Manuscripts primarily consist of the papers and transcriptions of the eighteenth century Welsh scholar Evan Evans Ieuan Brydydd Hir), that were acquired by his patron Paul Panton, Plas Gwyn, Anglesey when Evans died. During the nineteenth century Panton's descendants refused to allow scholars to access the manuscripts. They were purchased by the National Library of Wales in 1914.

Evans visited many libraries in Wales, including Hengwrt and Wynnstay, to transcribe rare Welsh manuscripts in order to preserve their literary content. The volumes include genealogies, poetry, pedigrees and Brut y Tywysogion.

Further items from the collections of Paul Panton, which were hitherto unknown, were purchased by Sir Herbert Lewis and presented to the National Library in 1919. The Panton Papers (NLW MSS 9051-9105), includes the Wynn of Gwydir family papers and Robert Vaughan's manuscript catalogue of the Hengwrt-Peniarth Library (NLW MS 9095B), which shows that the Peniarth Manuscripts have survived almost intact since c.1659.

== Mostyn Manuscripts (NLW MSS 3020-76) ==
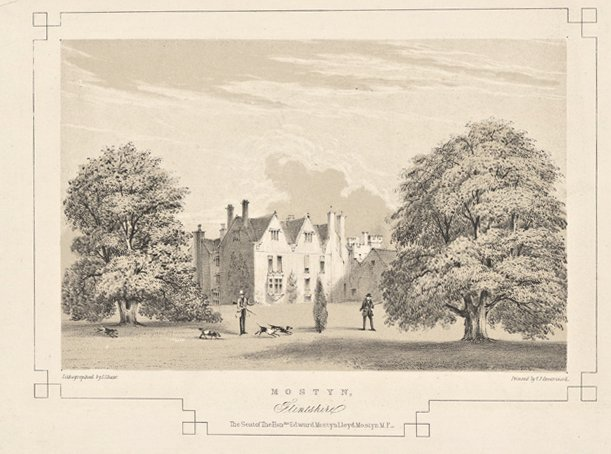
Mostyn Hall, Flintshire.

Fifty-six of the fifty-seven Welsh manuscripts from the collection of Lord Mostyn, Mostyn Hall that were catalogued in the Report on Manuscripts in the Welsh Language by J. Gwenogvryn Evans are now in the National Library. Cyril Wright purchased this group of the Mostyn Welsh manuscripts and presented them to the Library in 1918, as the collection was being broken up and sold.

A manuscript by Gutun Owain (NLW MS 3026) is unusual by the standards of medieval Welsh manuscripts as it contains colour illustration. It was produced between 1488 and 1498 and contains texts about astrology, a calendar, a treatise on urine, the life of St. Martin, and genealogy and history from Adam to Asclobitotus. The volume, well bound in white vellum, was Mostyn Library MS 88 and had previously been kept in the Gloddaeth Library, which was part of Mostyn estate.

== Bourdillon Manuscripts (NLW MSS 5001-48) ==
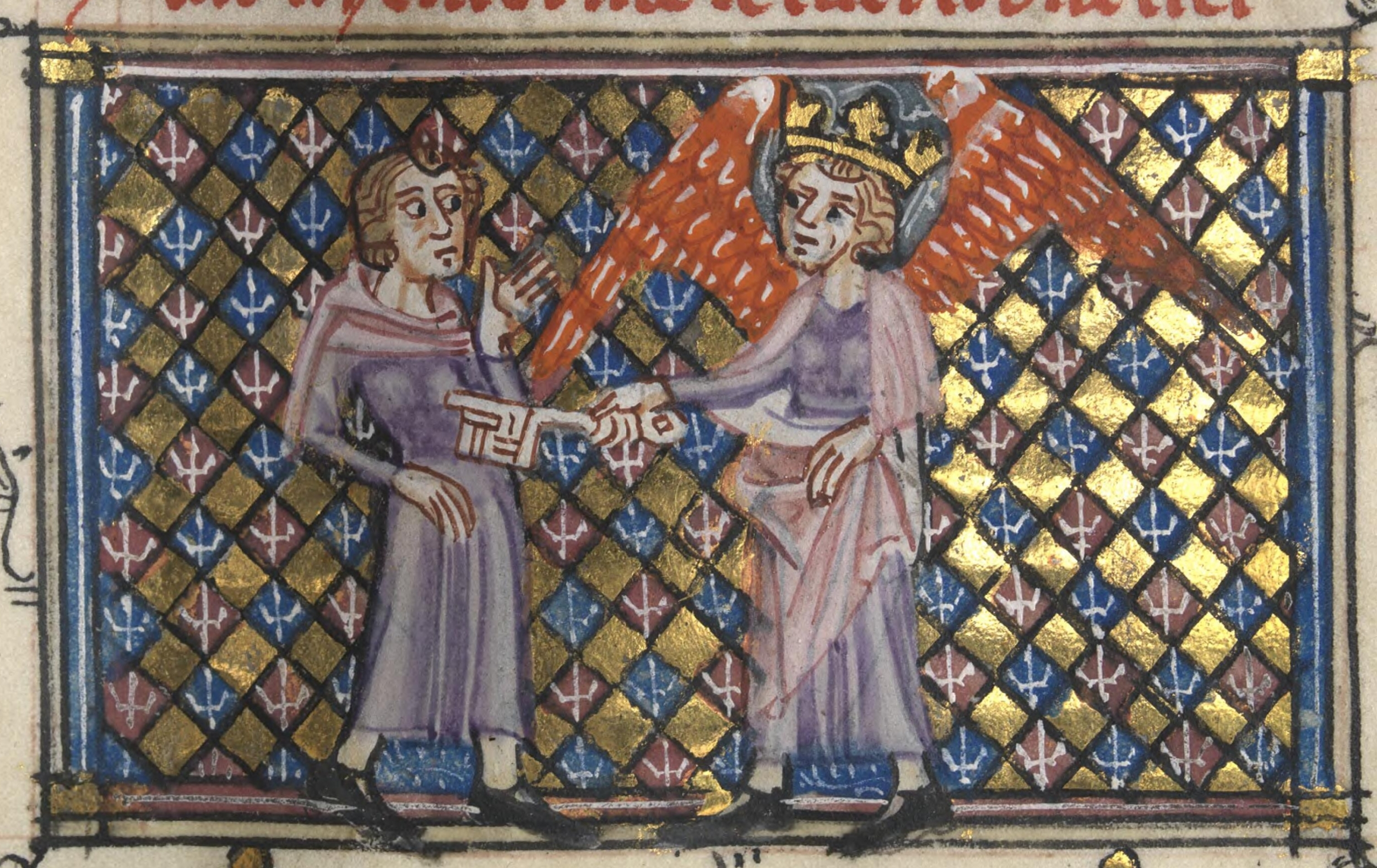
Roman de la Rose (NLW MS 5016, f. 15r.b). In this miniature the God of Love locks the Lover's heart.

These manuscripts were part of the library of Francis William Bourdillon that the National Library of Wales purchased in 1922. Bourdillon had collected materials for the study of medieval French romance and manuscripts from the thirteenth century onwards can be found in this collection, including several fourteenth-century editions of the Roman de la Rose. In addition to the original medieval manuscripts, there are also transcripts, translations and notes from Bourdillion's research contained in this group of manuscripts.

== Dingestow Court Manuscripts (NLW MSS 5261-75) ==
This group of manuscripts, which Sir John Bernard Bosanquet collected at Dingestow Court, Monmouthshire, was acquired in 1916. It includes an early Welsh translation of Geoffrey of Monmouth's Historia Regum Britanniae (NLW MSS 5266B), written in the fourteenth century. It was subsequently edited by Henry Lewis and published under the title of Brut Dingestow by the University of Wales Press in 1942.

== Henry Taylor Manuscripts (NLW MSS 6267-6331) ==
Henry Taylor transferred his collection of books and documents relating to the history of Flintshire to the National Library of Wales to form the basis of a historical collection for the County of Flint. The collection includes Taylor's notes and copies of documents concerning the County, the Minute Book of the Court of Great Sessions for the County of Flint 1705 to 1756, and a scrapbook containing material relating to the 500th anniversary of the confinement of Richard II at Flint Castle.

== Griffith of Cae Cyriog Manuscripts (NLW MSS 7006-10) ==
This small group of manuscripts, which had previously belonged to John Griffith of Cae Cyriog, include the Black Book of Basingwerk (NLW MS 7006), a seventeenth-century transcript of Pum Llyfyr Kerddwriaeth in the hand of John Jones, Gellilyfdy (NLW MS 7007), and pedigrees relating to the Griffith family and other North Wales families. They became the property of the National Library in 1933 but had been a deposit in the library since 1910.

The Black Book of Basingwerk is a Welsh language text of Geoffrey of Monmouth’s Historia Regum Britanniae, the latter section was written by Gutun Owain, who was associated with Basingwerk Abbey, in the fifteenth century.

== Verney Music Manuscripts (NLW MSS 10918-30) ==
The Verney Music Manuscript Collection, which was donated by Margaret Maria Verney in 1923, provides an insight into the musical interests of the nobility during the eighteenth and nineteenth centuries. The earliest manuscript is MS 10929 which dates from 1732. It belonged to Mary Nicholson, who was a harpsichord pupil of Maurice Green, and contains eighteen original keyboard compositions by Green. There are forty-two harpsichord pieces in total, including some of the most popular music of the period by Corelli, Handel, Bononcini, Porpora, Hasse and Araja. The manuscript contains the hand of William Boyce, who was Green's pupil, in addition to those of Nicholson and Green.

== Alcwyn Evans Manuscripts (NLW MSS 12366-12388) ==
Alcwyn Caryni Evans (1827-1902) was an antiquary with a particular interest in the history of Carmarthen. Evans collected a considerable amount of material related to this town and county and he produced twelve large, beautifully written volumes of transcriptions and research findings. These manuscripts include transcriptions of, and extracts from, borough records, parish registers, church records, inscriptions and epitaphs in churches and churchyards, poems, and the accounts of the Carmarthen Literary and Scientific Institution; historical and architectural notes on castles, and notes concerning the Rebecca Riots, are also present. In 1867 Alcwyn Evans was awarded a gold medal at the National Eisteddfod for his manuscript work A History of the Town and County of Caermarthen, which is present in this group. There are also two volumes of genealogical material such as pedigrees.

The manuscripts were purchased and donated to the National Library of Wales by R. J. R. Loxdale at a Sotheby's sale on 18 July 1939.

== Wigfair Manuscripts (NLW MSS 12401-513) ==
The manuscripts from John Lloyd's library at Wigfair is rich in autograph letters from the late sixteenth century through to the mid-nineteenth century. The earliest letters are those written in Welsh by the poet Sion Tudur and there are many letters addressed to Lloyd during the eighteenth and nineteenth centuries by well known correspondents including seventy letters from the President of the Royal Society, Sir Joseph Banks. Other letters were sent by the diarist R. F. Greville, Sir William Herschel, Jonas Dryander, Sir George Shuckburgh-Evelyn, Astronomer Royal Nevil Maskelyne, Sir Henry Engefield, Sir Charles Blagden, Sir John Rennie, Samuel Lysons, Thomas Pennant, Philip Yorke, Dean Shipley, Daines Barrington, Gwallter Mechain and a number of bishops.

In addition to the letters written to John Lloyd, there are others, from around 1770 to 1781, addressed to his father Howel Lloyd, his mother, Dorothea Lloyd, and his sisters Susannah and Phoebe Lloyd. Earlier letters, from between 1676 and 1710, to Edward Lloyd form a large group and those sent to Maurice Wynn Groom of His Majesty's Privy Chamber between 1661 and 1678 are also of interest. There are also groups of letters related to the Howard and Conway families who were linked to the Lloyd family by marriage.

== Llanover Manuscripts (NLW MSS 13061-184) ==
In 1916 Sir Ivor Herbert deposited the Llanover Manuscripts in the National Library and his daughter the Hon. Fflorens Roch later converted the deposit into a donation. The Llanover Manuscripts comprise seventy-seven volumes of notes, transcripts and compositions in the hand of Edward Williams (Iolo Morganwg) on a wide variety of subjects including druid mythology, bardism, fruit culture, geology and medicine, and more than forty further volumes of Welsh manuscripts dating from the late sixteenth to mid-eighteenth century and mostly originating in Glamorgan, which Iolo Morganwg acquired.

== Mysevin Manuscripts (NLW MSS 13221-13263) ==
The Mysevin manuscript collection of forty-two volumes was assembled by the lexicographer, antiquary and littérateur William Owen-Pughe. There are over 700 letters addressed to Owen-Pughe by prominent figures in the cultural life of England and Wales including: Owain Myfyr, over seventy letters from Iolo Morganwg, Gwallter Mechain, Siôn Ceiriog, William Jones (Llangadfan), Thomas Pennant, Paul Panton, Hugh Davies, Theophilus Jones, Edward Davies, Richard Fenton, Richard Llwyd, Twm o'r Nant, David Samwell, Dafydd Ddu Eryri, Thomas Johnes, Sir Richard Colt Hoare, Joseph Allen, Thomas Charles, J. R. Jones, W. Richards, Morgan John Rhys, Hugh Jones, Sir Walter Scott, George Chalmers, William Coxe, and Joanna Southcott.

Another group of manuscripts document the activities of the Gwyneddigion, Cymreigyddion, and Cymmrodorion Societies in the eighteenth and nineteenth centuries. Further manuscripts consist of the transcripts of Welsh poetry taken by Owen-Pughe and miscellaneous volumes and papers that he acquired.

== Sherbrooke Missal and De Grey Hours (NLW MSS 15536-7) ==
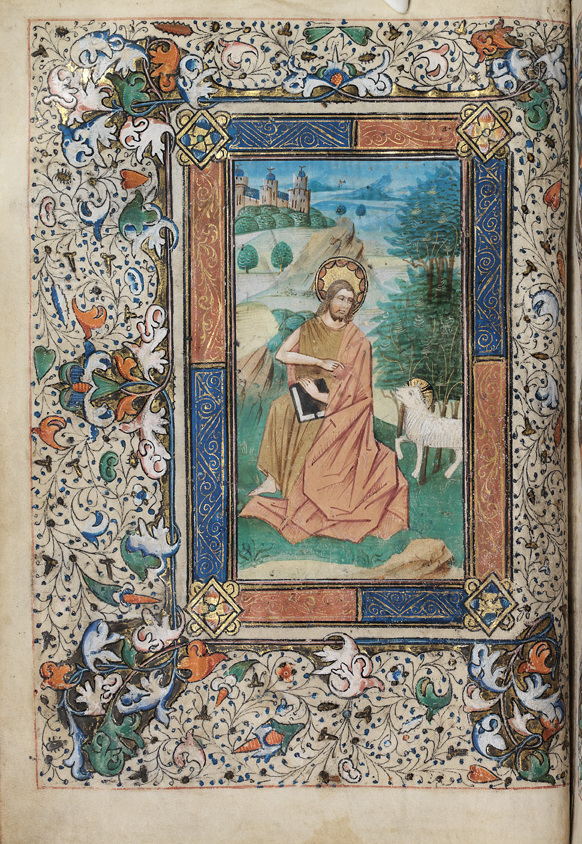
'De Grey' Hours (f.24.v), St John the Baptist

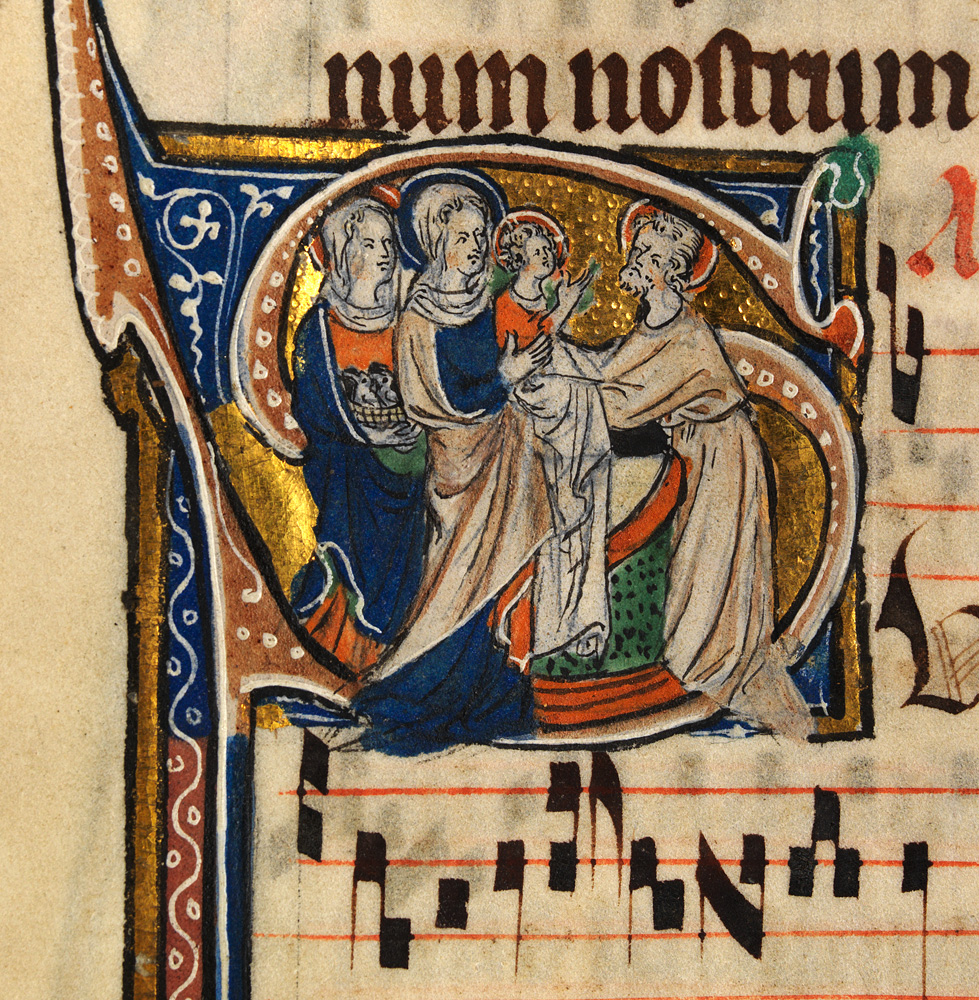
An historiated initial from the Sherbrooke Missal. Presentation of Christ in the Temple

The Sherbrooke Missal and De Grey Hours were both part of the manuscript collection of Henry Yates Thompson that was sold by Sotheby's in 1920. Gwendoline Davies purchased both of these manuscripts at the auction and they were donated to the Library by Margaret Davies in 1951.

The Sherbrooke Missal (NLW MS 15536E) is one of the earliest Missals of English origin. It was made in East Anglia sometime around 1310 to 1320. The manuscript's parchment leaves are beautifully embellished with an unusual amount of illuminated miniatures, which add its importance. From the sixteenth to the nineteenth century the manuscript was kept in the Sherbrooke family library in Oxton, Nottinghamshire before it passed into the ownership of the artist William Morris. Manuscript collector Henry Yates Thompson brought the Sherbrooke Missal and retained ownership until it was auctioned by Sotheby's in 1920.

The 'De Grey' Hours (NLW MS 15537C) is a mid-fifteenth-century book of hours that was produced in Flanders for the English market. It is illuminated with twenty historiated initials and forty-seven full or half page miniatures.

== Llangibby Castle Collection (NLW MSS 16962-17109) ==
In 1939 an extensive selection of manuscript, printed, and graphic material from the Llangibby Castle Library was placed on permanent deposit in the National Library. These collections, which belonged to Major Albert Addams-Williams, are mostly associated with history and people of Monmouthshire. The manuscripts include Sir Thomas Williams of Trefriw's autograph of Prif Achae holh Gymru Benbaladr, an autograph memoir of Dic Aberdaron, sermons of Micah Thomas, first principal of Abergavenny Baptist College, Sir Richard Colt Hoare's Itinerary of Wales (c. 1776), Arthur Machen's manuscript of The Gift of Tongues, miscellaneous works of Sir Charles Hanbury Williams, and various pedigrees, correspondence, court rolls and deeds.

== Groups of manuscripts in the General Collection ==
The General Collection includes the following groups of manuscripts:

- Celynog (NLW MSS 527-92).
- Lewis Morris (NLW MSS 600-8).
- Aberaeron (NLW MSS 609-23).
- Owen Thomas (NLW MSS 624-40; 1206; 4836).
- University College Wales (NLW MSS 641-99).
- John Davies (NLW MSS 702-13).
- Plas Power (NLW MSS 716-36).
- Ty Coch (NLW MSS 815-68).
- Thomas Stephens (NLW MSS 904-66).
- Llywarch Reynolds (NLW MSS 970-97).
- Ellis Owen (NLW MSS 998-1024).
- Ieuan Gwynedd (NLW MSS 1025-36).
- Archdeacon A. O. Evans (NLW MSS 1042-54; 4847; 4967-9; 6260-6261; 6711-6715; 7902-42; 10360-3; 10825-36).
- Orielton (NLW MSS 1073-7).
- Fforest Legionis (NLW MSS 1125-75).
- D. R. Thomas (NLW MSS 1178-1205; 14654-94).
- Hugh Williams (NLW MSS 1265-1329; 2081-97).
- Henry Owen (NLW MSS 1341-1453; 6875).
- Kinmel (NLW MSS 1501-1631).
- Crosswood (NLW MSS 1641-1952; 19897-8).
- Hafod y Porth (NLW MSS 1953-8).
- Panton (NLW MSS 1970-2068).
- Trebor Aled (NLW MSS 2101-05).
- Charles Ashton (NLW MSS 2131-34).
- Nottage Court (NLW MSS 2201-20).
- S. T. Evans (NLW MSS 2231-42; 7538).
- J. C. Jones (NLW MSS 2311-35).
- Emrys ap Iwan (NLW MSS 2341-53).
- Thomas Price (Prestatyn) (NLW MSS 2361-75).
- D. Stephan Davies (NLW MSS 2381-2407).
- Edward Anwyl (NLW MSS 2421-2505).
- Glan Alaw (NLW MSS 2506-19).
- Pennant of Downing (NLW MSS 2521-98; 4488; 4877-80; 5500-02; 12706-20; 15421 36).
- Ioan Pedr (NLW MSS 2601-36).
- Owen Jones (Llansantffraid) (NLW MSS 2641-79).
- Edward Griffith (Dolgelley) (NLW MSS 2691-2754).
- Canon R. Trevor Owen (NLW MSS 2771-88).
- Henry William Wynn (NLW MSS 2789-2806).
- David Samuel (NLW MSS 2809-46).
- J. Hobson Matthews (NLW MSS 2851-3).
- Benjamin Hall (NLW MSS 2871-4).
- Evan Davies (Trefriw) (NLW MSS 2881-9).
- E. Penllyn Jones (NLW MSS 2891-5).
- Haverfordwest (NLW MSS 2921-3018; 4474).
- Mostyn (NLW MSS 3020-76; 21238-54).
- Thomas Nicholas (NLW MSS 3091-3106).
- Bonsall (NLW MSS 3113-19).
- T. H. Thomas (Arlunydd Penygarn) (NLW MSS 3122-71; 6358-60; 6995-7).
- E. Ceredig Jones (NLW MSS 3151-87).
- Daniel Davies (Ton) (NLW MSS 3191-8).
- Nathan Dyfed (NLW MSS 3271-89).
- Josiah Thomas Jones (NLW MSS 3301-77).
- D. M. Richards (NLW MSS 3461-72).
- Millingchamp (NLW MSS 3473; 4391-4412; 13485; 13737; 13933-5; 13915-16).
- Tryfan (NLW MSS 3489-99).
- Puleston (NLW MSS 3561-88).
- Lleufer Thomas (NLW MSS 3601-40).
- William Floyd (NLW MSS 3641-4252).
- John Phillips (Bangor) (NLW MSS 4254-6).
- Tremeirchion Parochial (NLW MSS 4260-70).
- George Eyre Evans (NLW MSS 4280-4300; 7945-84; 13271-685; 14631-39).
- Ivor James (NLW MSS 4301-39).
- Rees Jenkin Jones (NLW MSS 4361-70).
- M. O. Jones (NLW MSS 4371-84).
- W. Jones Williams (NLW MSS 4441-53).
- Talhaiarn (NLW MSS 4501-15).
- Coed Coch (NLW MSS 4571-4577; 6616-19).
- D. S. Davies (NLW MSS 4611-19).
- Stokes-Meyer Facsimiles of Irish MSS. (NLW MSS 4631-95).
- Frederick Tombs (NLW MSS 4711-30).
- Scourfield (NLW MSS 4741-9; 4875; 5985).
- R. J. Rees (NLW MSS 4761-95).
- Bridgwater (NLW MSS 4796-4807).
- Southey and Williams-Wynn Papers (NLW MSS 4811-19).
- Archbishop Green (NLW MSS 4838-41).
- Edmondes Owen (NLW MSS 4864-73).
- Bodelwyddan (NLW MSS 4881-98).
- Boultibrooke (NLW MSS 4901-12).
- John Orlando Parry (NLW MSS 4925-31).
- Howard de Walden (NLW MSS 4970-3; 4988; 6074).
- Samuel Holland (NLW MSS 4983-87).
- Vaux (NLW MSS 4991-94).
- Bourdillon (NLW MSS 5001-5148).
- Powell (Newcastle Emlyn) (NLW MSS 5149-52).
- G. T. Clark (NLW MSS 5171-5234).
- Dingestow Court (NLW MSS 5261-75).
- Powel (NLW MSS 5276-94).
- Herbert (NLW MSS 5295-5313).
- O'Grady (NLW MSS 5314-68).
- Hugh Roberts of Holywell (NLW MSS 5371-81).
- M. E. James (NLW MSS 5404-9).
- Henllan (NLW MSS 5452-73).
- John Phillips of Bangor (NLW MSS 5479-82).
- Timothy Davis (of Coventry and Evesham) (NLW MSS 5487-99).
- Richard (NLW MSS 5503-11).
- Rhuddenfab (NLW MSS 5512-21; 6975-78).
- David Owen Thomas (NLW MSS 5522-5).
- Beren (NLW MSS 5526-30).
- Castle Green (NLW MSS 5532-43).
- Ignatius Williams (NLW MSS 5544-7).
- G. Arbour Stephens (NLW MSS 5587-90).
- Harris Williams (NLW MSS 5604-62; 6441-64).
- Gwalchmai (NLW MSS 5668-5772).
- W. J. Parry (NLW MSS 5775-89).
- John Evans (Abermeurig) (NLW MSS 5805-43).
- Islwyn (NLW MSS 5854-79).
- Ieuan O Leyn (NLW MSS 5880-5904).
- E. L. Roberts (NLW MSS 5906-10).
- Hartland (NLW MSS 5923-9; 6798-6848; 7539).
- Mihangel ap Iwan (NLW MSS 5934-6; 7254-7264).
- Henry Blackwell (NLW MSS 5940-6).
- Meiriadog (NLW MSS 5950-73).
- Martelli (NLW MSS 5979-83).
- D. C. Lloyd-Owen (NLW MSS 5986-6023).
- Tafolog (NLW MSS 6035-40).
- St. Asaph (Bishop's Palace) (NLW MSS 6045-8).
- Rhesycae (NLW MSS 6085-9).
- Fforest Legionis (NLW MSS 6090-4).
- Egerton Allen (NLW MSS 6095-6132; 7533-7; 12219-12222).
- Gwynfryn (NLW MSS 6133-9).
- Frondirion (NLW MSS 6154-89; 10850-65; 11026).
- Llanfyllin, Groups I & II(NLW MSS 6211-7; 6726-7).
- Lleufer Thomas (NLW MSS 6238-53).
- Henry Taylor (NLW MSS 6267-6331).
- Chwibren (NLW MSS 6332-51).
- Huw Williams (Rhodesia) (NLW MSS 6352-6).
- W. M. Myddelton (NLW MSS 6363-6401).
- Ap Vychan (NLW MSS 6436-40).
- W. M. Evans (NLW MSS 6471-3).
- Isaac Davies (Birkenhead) (NLW MSS 6474-7).
- Whitford (NLW MSS 6479-89).
- Traherne-Mansel Franklen (NLW MSS 6511-6615; 11964-81).
- Rhuddgaer (NLW MSS 6664-9).
- Evan Lewis (NLW MSS 6760-5).
- Evan Edwardes (NLW MSS 6771-97).
- Alban Morris (NLW MSS 6851-66).
- Bronwylfa, Llandderfel (NLW MSS 6881-93; 7492-7530).
- Sir Lewis Morris (NLW MSS 6901-65).
- Burrell (NLW MSS 6979-83).
- Griffith of Cae Cyriog (NLW MSS 7006-10).
- Nefydd (NLW MSS 7011-7189; 7768-79; 9367-9; 22262-8).
- Carneddog (NLW MSS 7234-53).
- Stedman Thomas (NLW MSS 7266-91).
- D. M. Richards (NLW MSS 7292-7315).
- Edwin Jones (NLW MSS 7316-43).
- David Salmon (NLW MSS 7344-54).
- Croesor (NLW MSS 7355-98).
- Gwrtheyrn (NLW MSS 7399-7422).
- Gwyndud Jones (NLW MSS 7423-33).
- Chidlaw Roberts (NLW MSS 7434-52).
- W. S. Clark (NLW MSS 7454-62).
- Evan Evans (Aberystwyth) (NLW MSS 7463-91).
- Haines (NLW MSS 7541-57).
- Bradney (NLW MSS 7561-7767; 9666).
- Ramsey (NLW MSS 7780-93; 9634-42; 11574-93).
- Alaw Afan (NLW MSS 7795-7803).
- Watcyn Wyn (NLW MSS 7804-15).
- H. Jones Davies (NLW MSS 7816-50; 10980-1; 12189-90; 12672-87).
- Fisher (NLW MSS 7858-65).
- Edward Evans (Talybont) (NLW MSS 7866-75).
- W. Tudor Jones (NLW MSS 7877-84).
- W. E. Morris (Portmadoc) (NLW MSS 7896-9).
- Emlyn Evans (NLW MSS 8001-49).
- Isaac Williams (NLW MSS 8050-63).
- Sir John Williams Music (NLW MSS 8086-8101; 8155-61).
- Kenrick (NLW MSS 8102-10).
- Thomas Jones (Llanfaethlu) (NLW MSS 8112-52).
- Lewis, Llanrhystyd (NLW MSS 8177-8200).
- John Orlando Parry (NLW MSS 8286-93).
- J. D. Jones (NLW MSS 8294-6).
- Thomas Gee (NLW MSS 8305-320).
- Matthews (NLW MSS 8321-9).
- Neuadd Wen (NLW MSS 8330-8444).
- Gwilym Hughes (NLW MSS 8450-71).
- Llew Meirion (NLW MSS 8476-95).
- Penybontfawr (NLW MSS 8497-8513).
- Jonathan Ceredig Davies (NLW MSS 8545-57).
- Elis O’r Nant (NLW MSS 8573-8612).
- John Davies, Ietwen (NLW MSS 8613-91).
- William John Parry (NLW MSS 8733-8863).
- Thomas Edwards (NLW MSS 8924-9037).
- The Panton Papers (NLW MSS 9051-9105).
- Hobley Griffith (NLW MSS 9151-9233).
- Dr. Joseph Parry (NLW MSS 9281-97).
- Edward Hughes (NLW MSS 9300-17).
- Llanarth (NLW MSS 9370-87).
- Edward Edwards (NLW MSS 9392-9453).
- Breese (NLW MSS 9471-89).
- Taliesin O Eifion (NLW MSS 9615-27).
- T. Sylvanus (NLW MSS 9679-84).
- Isaac Davies (NLW MSS 9728-44).
- Piercy (NLW MSS 9745-9849).
- Derlwyn (NLW MSS 9860-9912).
- R. H. Richards (NLW MSS 9913-8).
- Sir John Ballinger (NLW MSS 9919-53).
- W. D. Roberts (NLW MSS 9957-10069).
- Moses Walters (NLW MSS 10072-97).
- G. G. T. Treherne (NLW MSS 10098-164).
- Ceiriog (NLW MSS 10165-96).
- Cynddelw (NLW MSS 10216-74).
- Solva (NLW MSS 10275-94).
- Hugh Ellis (NLW MSS 10296-10313).
- J. D. Richards (NLW MSS 10314-24).
- Dr. T. W. Thomas (NLW MSS 10331-8).
- Charles Davies (NLW MSS 10372-435).
- Evan Owen (NLW MSS 10443-548).
- Pantyclochydd (NLW MSS 10551-4).
- T. Eurwedd Williams (NLW MSS 10678-707; 12514-21).
- Idris Davies (NLW MSS 10810-12; 20770-1; 22397-415; 23539).
- Verney (NLW MSS 10918-10931)
- E. R. Horsfall Turner (NLW MSS 10960-77).
- Glan Menai (NLW MSS 11049-52).
- Brynbella (NLW MSS 11096-104).
- Corston (NLW MSS 11162-11228).
- Pandy (NLW MSS 11356-429).
- Plas Yolyn (NLW MSS 11430-81).
- Cilau-Wen (NLW MSS 11509-32).
- Meillionog (NLW MSS 11599-607).
- D. Morgan Lewis (NLW MSS 11614-97).
- Pant-Coy (NLW MSS 11701-18; also see 11117 & 11119).
- Elliss (NLW MSS 11737-59).
- Behrens (NLW MSS 11760-88).
- Brawdy (NLW MSS 11790-813; 12166-12174).
- Richard Bennett (NLW MSS 11817-11881).
- Spurrell (NLW MSS 11884-11889).
- J. T. Evans (NLW MSS 11990-12040).
- D. D. Williams (NLW MSS 12053-61).
- Morris T. Williams (NLW MSS 12138-12161).
- Eluned Morgan (NLW MSS 12198-12204).
- E. Stanton Roberts (NLW MSS 12238-12261).
- E. O. Davies (NLW MSS 12299-12349).
- Robinson (NLW MSS 12353-12355).
- Alcwyn C. Evans (NLW MSS 12366-12388).
- Evan D. Jones (NLW MSS12389-95).
- Wigfair (NLW MSS 12401-12513).
- Morgan Richardson (NLW MSS 12533-57).
- A. Stanley Davies (NLW MSS 12558-81).
- D. E. Jenkins (NLW MSS 12731-853).
- Gwern Y Pant (NLW MSS 12865-73).
- Richard Rees (NLW MSS 12904-15).
- William Porter (NLW MSS 12920-13050).
- Llanover (NLW MSS 13061-184).
- J. M. Howell (NLW MSS 13189-13207).
- Mysevin (NLW MSS 13221-13263).
- Sir John Lynn Thomas (NLW MSS 13723-36).
- Philip Thomas (NLW MSS 13738-81).
- Llangeitho Benefit Society (NLW MSS 13795-812).
- Elphin (NLW MSS 13814-48).
- Archdeacon Church-Jones (NLW MSS 13849-61).
- G.T.O. Bridgeman (NLW MSS 13863-6).
- Ffosrhydgaled (NLW MSS 13870-9).
- Gomer M. Roberts (NLW MSS 13881-4).
- Denbighshire county library (NLW MSS 13885-96).
- R. D. Roberts (NLW MSS 13897-13914).
- Ifan Kyrle Fletcher (NLW MSS 13296-7).
- Hugh Morris (NLW MSS 13929-31).
- Cymreigyddion y Fenni (NLW MSS 13958-70).
- Archdeacon Owen Evans (NLW MSS 13971-14001).
- Evan Williams (NLW MS 14101-9).
- Rees Jenkin Jones (NLW MSS 14147-213).
- Alltlwyd (NLW MSS 14214-28).
- Sarah E. Miles (NLW MSS 14233-42).
- Oakford (NLW MSS 14243-14333).
- D. Rhys Phillips (NLW MSS 14362-73).
- T. R. Lewis (NLW MSS 14381-401).
- Penar Griffiths (NLW MSS 14461-518).
- John Morgan (NLW MSS 14602-28).
- E. M. Bishop (NLW MSS 14709-40).
- Jack Edwards (NLW MSS 14741-96).
- Nefydd (NLW MSS 14853-62).
- Evan Roberts Llandderfel (NLW MSS 14901-7).
- Gwen John (NLW MSS 14930-1; 21468; 22155; 22276-318).
- Clark (NLW MSS 14991-15061).
- Howell Ll. Davies (NLW MSS 15193-226).
- Leila Mégane (NLW MSS 15281-310).
- D. Pryse Williams (NLW MSS 15622-963; 15985-16039).
- J. R. Hughes (NLW MSS 16053-75).
- Ynysgain (NLW MSS 16135-8).
- E. I. Williams (NLW MSS 16152-63; 16335-40).
- Jane Morgan (NLW MSS 16395-472).
- W. C. Rhys (NLW MSS 16653-6).
- D. Glanaman Jones (NLW MSS 16687-97).
- Bontdolgadfan (NLW MSS 16728-89).
- Maurice Jones (NLW MSS 16810-17).
- J. T. Rees (NLW MSS 16841-50; 19923-76).
- Ernest L. M. Prichard (NLW MSS 16862-73).
- Llangibby Castle Collection (NLW MSS 16962-17109).
- Gwysaney (NLW MSS 17110-162).
- Ab Ithel (NLW MSS 17163-90).
- Reverend W. Rhys Watkin (NLW MSS 17242-302).
- Thomas Jones (NLW MSS 17287-302).
- Castell Gwallter Lodge (NLW MSS 17308-21).
- Thomas Powys (NLW MSS 17322-340).
- Reverend J. Gwyddno Williams (NLW MSS 17348-80).
- Thomas Levi (NLW MSS 17531-666).
- Pugh Family of Argoed (NLW MSS 17692-714).
- John Orlando Parry (NLW MSS 17716-40).
- Edward Owen (NLW MSS 17974-18102).
- R. Bryn Williams (NLW MSS 18175-18246; 19010-37).
- Borth-y-gest (NLW MSS 18262-418).
- Llanmaes (NLW MSS 18470-599).
- J. Seymour Rees (NLW MSS 18628-707; 18764-866; 19383-7).
- Berta Ruck (NLW MSS 18954; 20677; 20806-7; 23306-9; 23376-8; 23437; 23523; 23569-73; 23715-27; 23733-46; 23780-3; 23790).
- South Wales Ironworks (NLW MSS 18975-9).
- Hugh William Jones (NLW MSS 18996-9).
- Reverend David Davies (NLW MSS 19054; 21730-3; 22106-8; 22244-8).
- H. Berkeley Score (NLW MSS 19107-14).
- Pencerdd Gwalia (NLW MSS 19118-47).
- Bob Owen (NLW MSS 19161-349).
- Llwch Arian (NLW MSS 19369-74).
- G. V. Roberts (NLW MSS 19400-39).
- Rendel (NLW MSS 19440-67).
- T. J. Evans (NLW MSS 19468-92).
- A. E. Jones ‘Y Goppa’ (Trawsfynydd) (NLW MSS 19493-515).
- J. D. Davies (NLW MSS 19516-23).
- Rev. John Prichard (NLW MSS 19576-87).
- Dr Owen Davies (NLW MSS 19588-98).
- Dr Ll. ap Ivan Davies (NLW MSS 19660-72).
- The Lower Swansea Valley Project (NLW MSS 19725-19736).
- Snell (NLW MSS 19761-896).
- J. Gwenogvryn Evans (NLW MSS 19900-9).
- Padarn Davies (NLW MSS 19910-22).
- David Lloyd George (NLW MSS 20403-93; 21787-92; 22514-37; 22823-8; 23657-71).
- Vernon Watkins (NLW MSS 20787; 21263-6; 22440-89; 22552-3; 22728-9; 22841; 23185; 23207, 23381-2 ).
- Brenda Chamberlain (NLW MSS 21484-525; 22493-4).
- Daniel Jones (NLW MSS 21738-42).
- Edward Thomas (NLW MSS 21750; 21859; 22003; 22900-21; 23077; 23103; 23222; 23299-300; 23695).
- John Cowper Powys (NLW MSS 21775-84; 21869-73: 21928-40; 22206-41; 22373-9; 22506-13; 22807-14; 23161-75; 23193-7; 23493-506; 23582-4; 23672-91; 23862).
- Newcastle Emlyn and Cenarth (NLW MSS 21798-801).
- Thomas Arthur Levi (NLW MSS 21808-10).
- Daisy G. Sharpe (NLW MSS 21813-15).
- Maria Elizabeth Thomas (NLW MSS 21836-41).
- Morgan-Clifford (NLW MSS 21848-52).
- Henry Williams (NLW MSS 21854-8; 23527).
- John Davies (NLW MSS 21860-4).
- Thomas Lewis (NLW MSS 21917-19).
- Dannie Abse (NLW MSS 21973-4; 21997-8; 22425-9; NLW ex 608).
- Beynon (NLW MSS 21981-6).
- Helen Thomas (NLW MSS 22003; 22914-18; 23103; 23299-300).
- Dr E. Roderic Bowen (NLW MSS 22015-18).
- Selwyn Jones Papers (NLW MSS 22025-8; 22035).
- William Evans (NLW MSS 22043-4).
- Welsh Agricultural Organisation Society (NLW MSS 22045-8).
- David James Jones (NLW MSS 22054-60).
- Edward Jones (NLW MSS 22067-9).
- Henry Williams (NLW MSS 22071-5).
- Charles Charman (NLW MSS 22083-7).
- Frank Phillips (NLW MSS 22123-5).
- Welsh clergymen (NLW MSS 22131-45).
- Alfred Neobard Palmer (NLW MSS 22157-61).
- Daniel Evans (NLW MSS 22173-84).
- Griffiths & Lewis (Glanhafren) (NLW MSS 22202-5).
- Gwen John (NLW MSS 22276-318; 23508-10).
- Reverend William Williams (NLW MSS 22323-7).
- Richard Hatchwell (NLW MSS 22331-3).
- Williams family of Aberpergwm (NLW MSS 22348-50).
- Marion Griffith Williams (Marion Eames) (NLW MSS 22495-500).
- Denis ApIvor (NLW MSS 22648-65; 22882-6; 23465-70).
- Madame Lucie Barbier (NLW MSS 22692-8).
- Edward Copleston (NLW MSS 22716-22).
- John Saunders Lewis (NLW MSS 22723-7; 22951-64; 23015-27; 23224-33; 23547-8).
- Michael Scott Archer (NLW MSS 22737-42).
- Griffith Phillips (NLW MSS 22755-8).
- Augustus John (NLW MSS 22775-803).
- John Barnard Jenkins (NLW MSS 22816-19).
- Edwinsford (NLW MSS 22864-71).
- Hamwood Papers (NLW MSS 22967-96).
- Ceri Richards (NLW MSS 23005-14).
- Reverend Dr Thomas Davies (NLW MSS 23041-6).
- Cronfa Saunders Lewis (NLW MSS 23047-50).
- Tours of Wales (NLW MSS 23062-7).
- Owen Owen (NLW MSS 23080-4; 23808).
- Llanddeiniol (NLW MSS 23095-102).
- Rhys Davies (NLW MSS 23106-9).
- Meic Stephens (NLW MSS 23111-12).
- Kate Davies (NLW MSS 23114-17).
- James Hanley (NLW MSS 23122-32).
- Raymond Garlick (NLW MSS 23176-7).
- Reverend David Evans (NLW MSS 23182-4).
- Barker family of Carmarthen (NLW MSS 23188-9).
- John Petts (NLW MSS 23207-13).
- Reverend Ben Davies (NLW MSS 23234-7).
- Richard Watkins (NLW MSS 23239-42).
- Megan Lloyd George (NLW MSS 23254-68).
- Sir John Philipps (NLW MSS 23273-6).
- William Henry Davies (NLW MSS 23279-80).
- George Crawshay (NLW MSS 23283-7).
- Dr Richard Price (NLW MSS 23291-2).
- John Dyer (NLW MSS 23294-7).
- Nassau William Senior (NLW MSS 23310-16).
- Geraint Dyfnallt Owen (NLW MSS 23317-46).
- David Thomas Jenkins (NLW MSS 23349-50).
- Wilhelm Ganz (NLW MSS 23351-6).
- Margiad Evans (NLW MSS 23357-74).
- Pencerdd Gwalia (NLW MSS 23389-409).
- Thomas Pennant's Outlines of the Globe (NLW MSS 23412-15).
- Keidrych Rhys (NLW MSS 23416-29).
- Robert Jones Derfel (NLW MSS 23440-62).
- Margaret Mostyn Jones (NLW MSS 23511-22).
- Eyton family of Leeswood (NLW MSS 23534-6).
- Philip Henry Burton (NLW MSS 23542-5).
- Pembrokeshire devotional works (NLW MSS 23578-80).
- Dorothy Enid Hanley (NLW MSS 23585-611).
- Owain Llewelyn Owain (NLW MSS 23612-56).
