= Robert Williams (antiquary) =

Welsh clergyman and antiquarian (1810–1881)

The Reverend Robert Williams
- Rector of Culmington

Personal details
- Born: 29 June 1810
- Died: 26 April 1881 (aged 70)
- Denomination: Anglican
- Education: Christ Church, Oxford

Robert Williams (1810–1881) was a Welsh Anglican clergyman and Celtic scholar.

== Life ==
Robert Williams, born at Conway, Carnarvonshire, on 29 June 1810, was the second son of Robert Williams, perpetual curate of Llandudno. He matriculated from Christ Church, Oxford, as servitor, on 10 June 1828, and graduated BA in 1832 and MA in 1836. After a short curacy at Llangerniew in West Denbighshire (1833–6), he became in 1837 vicar of Llangadwaladr, to which was added in 1838 the perpetual curacy of Rhydycroesau, near Oswestry. The former he held till 1877, and the latter till 1879, when he was appointed to the rectory of Culmington, Shropshire. This, together with an honorary canonry at St. Asaph conferred upon him in 1872, he held till his death.

He died, unmarried, on 26 April 1881. He was buried on 2 May at Culmington, where a memorial stone with a Welsh and Cornish inscription, provided by public subscription, was placed in 1899.

== Works ==
While still an undergraduate, Williams evinced his taste for Welsh research by winning, in 1831, a prize offered by the Cymmrodorion Society for the best "biographical sketch of the most eminent Welshmen since the Reformation". The society had his production translated into Welsh and printed under the title of Enwogion Cymru. In 1836 the English version was issued with additions (London, 12mo), and it was subsequently developed into Enwogion Cymru: A Biographical Dictionary of Eminent Welshmen (Llandovery, 1852, 8vo), which was then the best work of its kind relating to the principality.

His most scholarly work, however, was his Lexicon Cornu-Britannicum: a Dictionary of the Ancient Celtic Language of Cornwall (Llandovery, 1865, 4to). In this lexicon copious examples with English translations are given from such Cornish works as are still extant, but its special feature was the addition of synonyms and cognate words from Welsh, Breton, Erse, Gaelic, and Manx. The author announced his intention of "completing the subject" by the issue of a Cornish grammar, but this never made its appearance. When the catholic epistles and gospels (Liherieu hag Avieleu, London, 1870) were first brought out in Breton, with parallel Welsh and Gaelic versions, Williams was responsible for a considerable portion of the Gaelic text. He also discovered at Peniarth a previously unknown Cornish drama, being the Ordinale de Vita Sancti Mereadoci.

Williams's next considerable undertaking was the editing, with translations and glossaries, of Selections from the Hengwrt MSS. preserved in the Peniarth Library. The first volume, which was completed in 1876 (London, 8vo), contained the Welsh text of the legend of the Holy Grail. Of the second volume, containing the Welsh versions of the Gests of Charlemayne, Bown o' Hamtown, the Elucidarium, and other religious compilations of the Middle Ages, two parts only were issued (in 1878 and 1880 respectively) during Williams's lifetime, but the translation was completed with critical and bibliographical notes by G. Hartwell Jones, thereby completing the second volume in 1892. According to the Dictionary of National Biography, this, in spite of its great value, is perhaps the least satisfactory of Williams's works, as his reading of the text is not always to be relied upon.

Williams supplied a translation of the Welsh poems contained in the Book of Taliesin (a thirteenth-century manuscript preserved at Peniarth) for William Forbes Skene's Four Ancient Books of Wales (Edinburgh, 1868, 8vo). He also wrote a history of his native town, published in 1835 under the title of The History of Aberconway (Denbigh, 8vo). He was for many years a member of the editorial committee of the Cambrian Archæological Association, and contributed papers to the Journal of that society as well as to the now defunct Cambrian Journal.

== Sources ==
- Jones Thomas (1959). "Williams, Robert (1810-1881), cleric, Celtic scholar and antiquary". Dictionary of Welsh Biography. University of Wales Press. Retrieved 12 September 2022.
- Meyer, Robert T. (1969). "The Middle-Cornish Play "Beunans Meriasek"". Comparative Drama, 3(1): pp. 54–64.
- Nutt, Alfred (1888). Studies on the Legend of the Holy Grail. London: Harrison and Sons. pp. 3, 38.
- Roberts, T. R. (1908). "Williams, Robert, 1810-1881". Eminent Welshmen: A Short Biographical Dictionary. Vol. 1. Cardiff & Merthyr Tydfil: The Educational Publishing Company, Ltd. pp. 586–587.
- Thomas, D. L.; Jones, Beti (2004). "Williams, Robert (1810–1881), Celtic scholar and antiquary". Oxford Dictionary of National Biography. Oxford University Press. Retrieved 12 September 2022.
- Archæologia Cambrensis. Third Series, No. LX. October 1869. pp. 408–409.
- Archæologia Cambrensis. Fourth Series.—Vol. XII, No. XLVI. April 1881. p. 172.
- Bye-gones. 5 July 1899. p. 155.

Attribution:

- This article incorporates text from a publication now in the public domain: Thomas, Daniel Lleufer (1900). "Williams, Robert (1810-1881)". In Lee, Sidney (ed.). Dictionary of National Biography. Vol. 61. London: Smith, Elder & Co. pp. 440–441.
