= De Grey Hours =

Illuminated manuscript

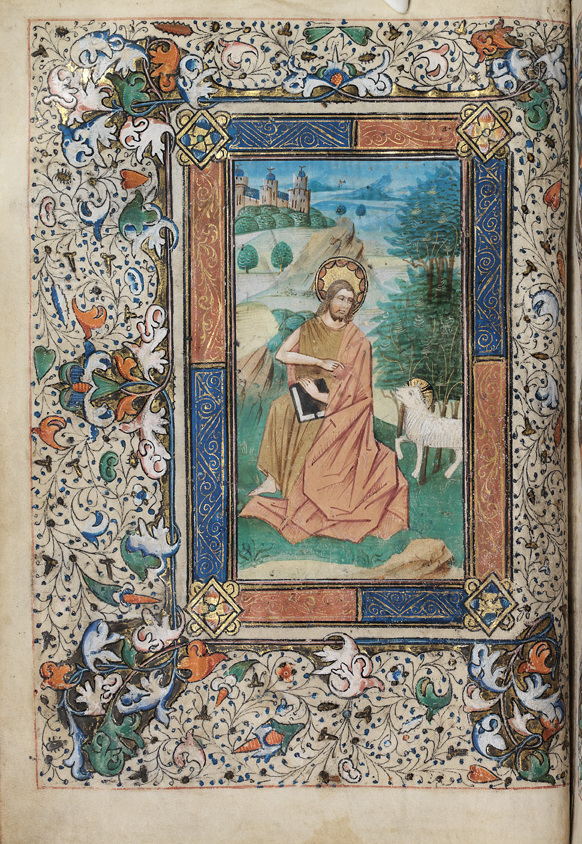
De Grey Hours (NLW MS 15537C), folio 24v. St. John the Baptist

The De Grey Hours (NLW MS 15537C) is a book of hours that was produced in Flanders, where the artist tailored the manuscript for the English market by including a miniature of St Thomas Becket and naming appropriate festivals in the Calendar. There are sixty-seven illustrations in the De Grey Hours, including illuminated miniatures and historiated initials. The manuscript dates from around 1400.

Several pieces of evidence are contained within the manuscript that connect it with the Grey family of Blisworth, Northamptonshire: the death of Elizabeth Grey, wife of Sir John, is referred to in an inscription, made during the early sixteenth century, in the Calendar for March; and the family arms inserted in the margins. Henry Yates Thompson owned the manuscript from 1895 until it was auctioned by Sotheby's in 1920. The De Grey Hours was purchased by Gwendoline Davies, and donated to the National Library of Wales by her sister Margaret Davies in 1951. The manuscript is NLW MS 15537C in the National Library's General Manuscript Collection.

== Gallery ==
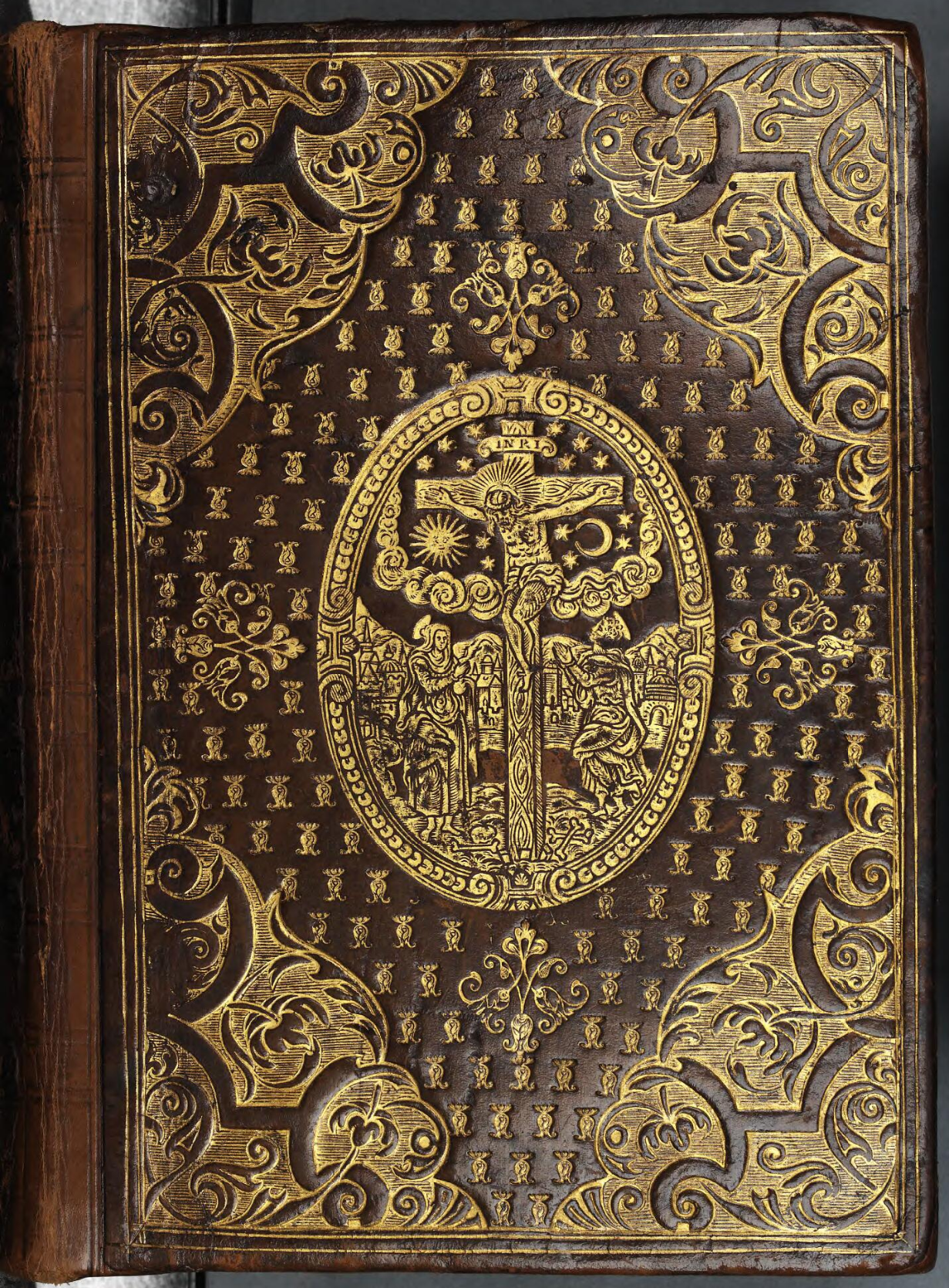
Manuscript Binding

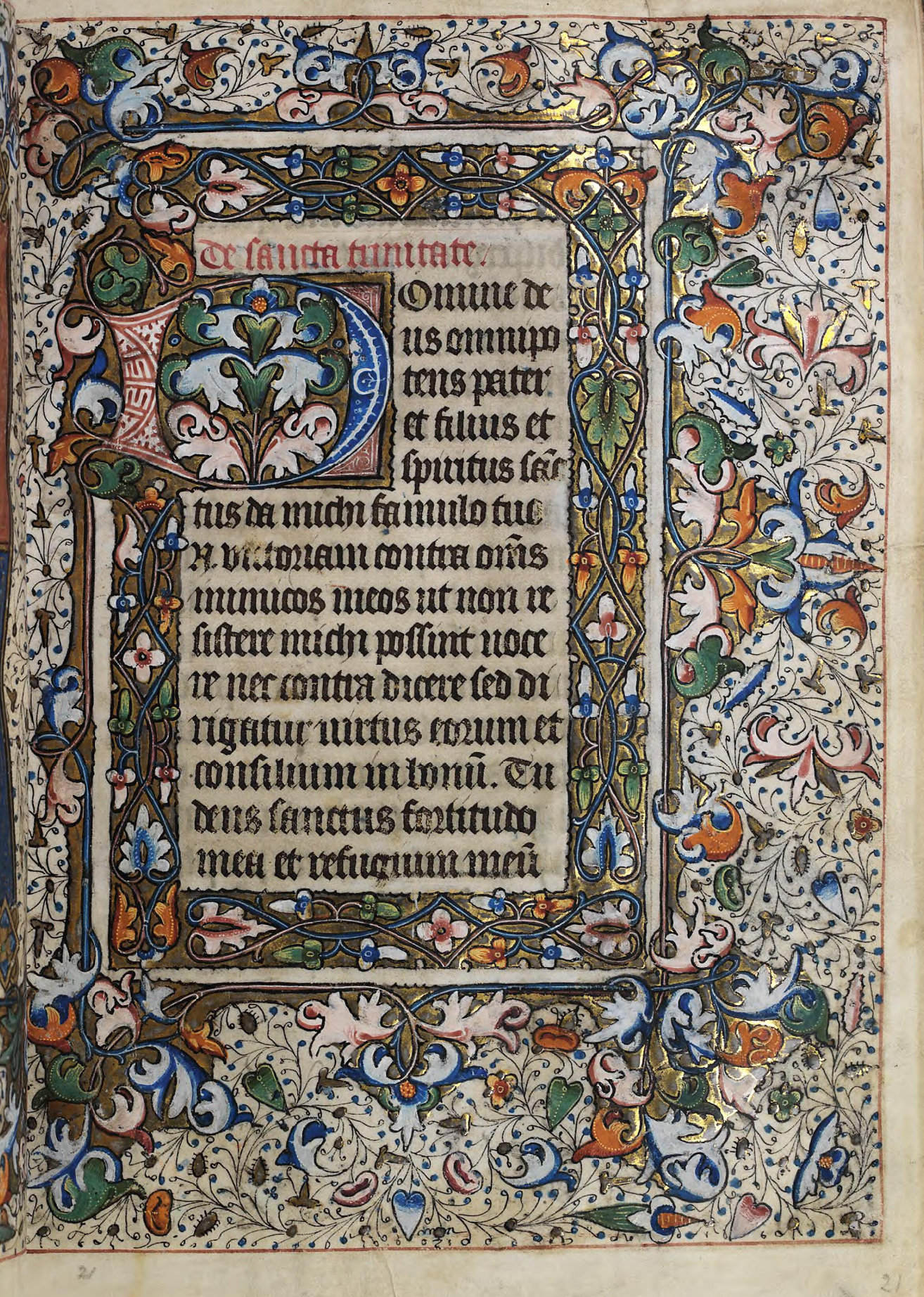
f.21.r

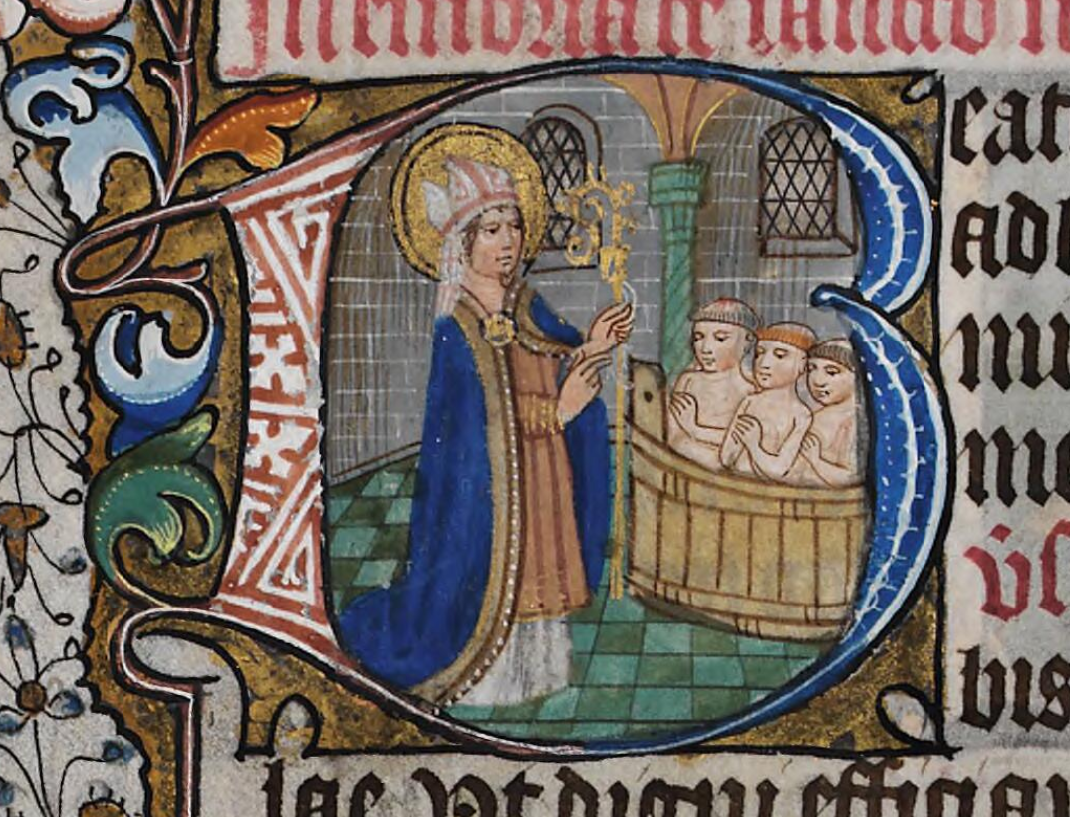
f.57.r St. Nicholas

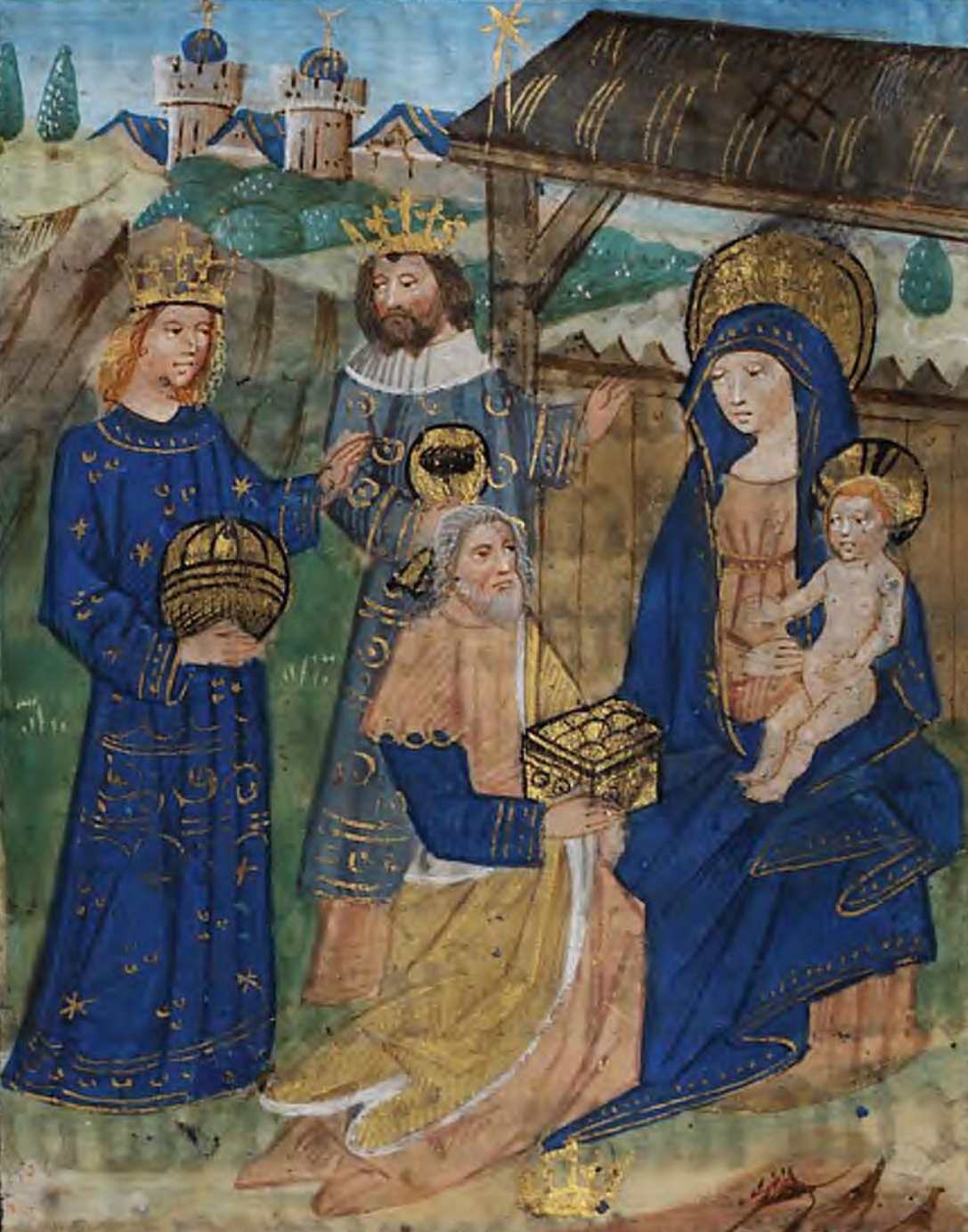
f.71.r Adoration of the Magi

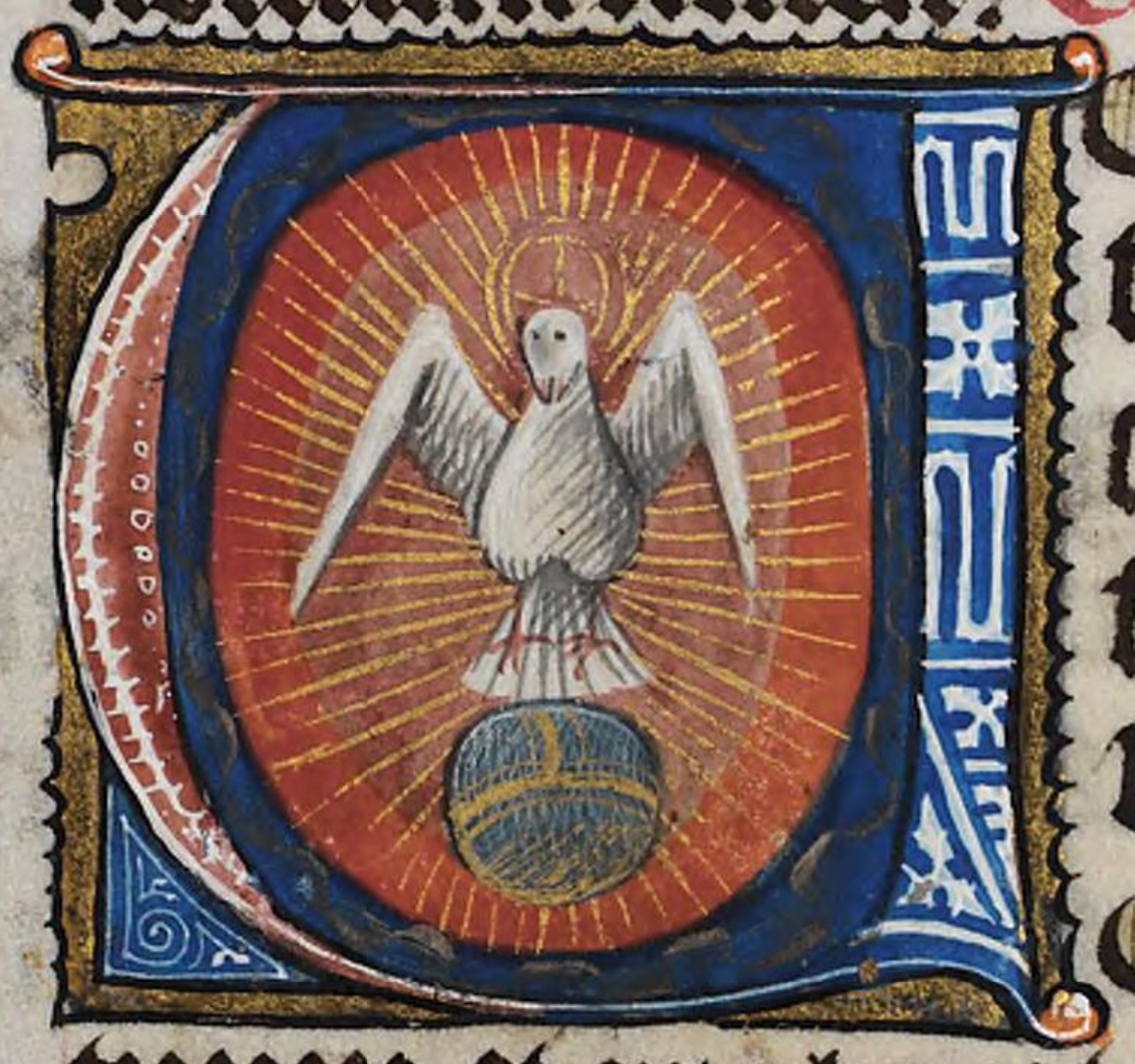
f.53.r The Holy Spirit
