= Sherbrooke Missal =

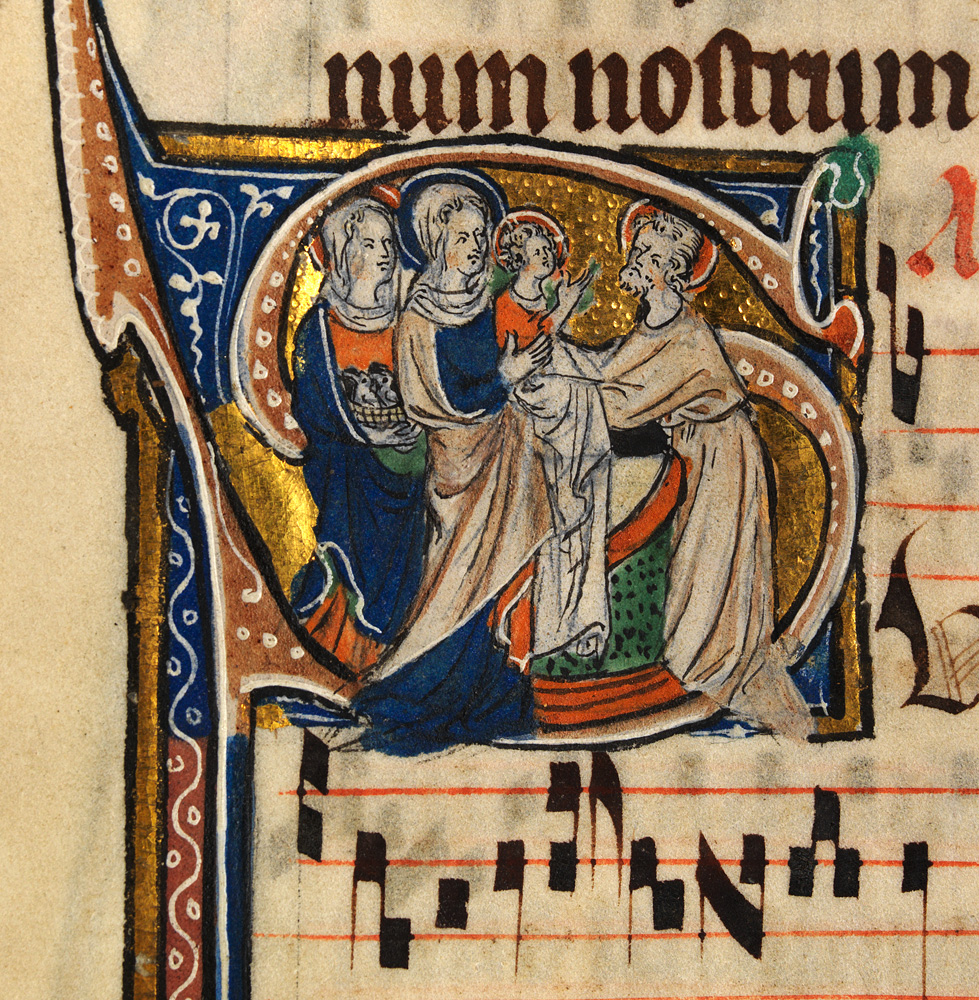
Illuminated letter S (for suscepimus deus) from the Sherbrooke Missal: Aberystwyth, National Library of Wales, MS 15536E, fol. 246r, parchment, c. 1310–1320, depicting the presentation of the baby Jesus in the temple.

The Sherbrooke Missal (NLW MS 15536E) is one of the earliest examples of a Missal that was produced in England, dating from circa 1310 to 1320. Only two other Missals from an English source are known to pre-date the Sherbrooke Missal. However, the Sherbrooke Missal is unusual as it contains many beautiful miniatures which are depictions of the manuscript's text. These images are similar in style to those found in the British Library's Queen Mary Psalter, which is also from the early fourteenth century.

From the sixteenth to the nineteenth century the manuscript was owned by the Sherbrooke family of Oxton, Nottinghamshire, and it is from their library that the Sherbrooke Missal takes its name. It was then the property of the artist William Morris, before being sold twice by Sotheby's, first to Henry Yates Thompson in 1898, and then to Gwendoline Davies in 1920. It was donated to the National Library of Wales by Margaret Davies in 1951, and it is now part of the General Manuscript Collection, with the catalogue number NLW MS 15536E.

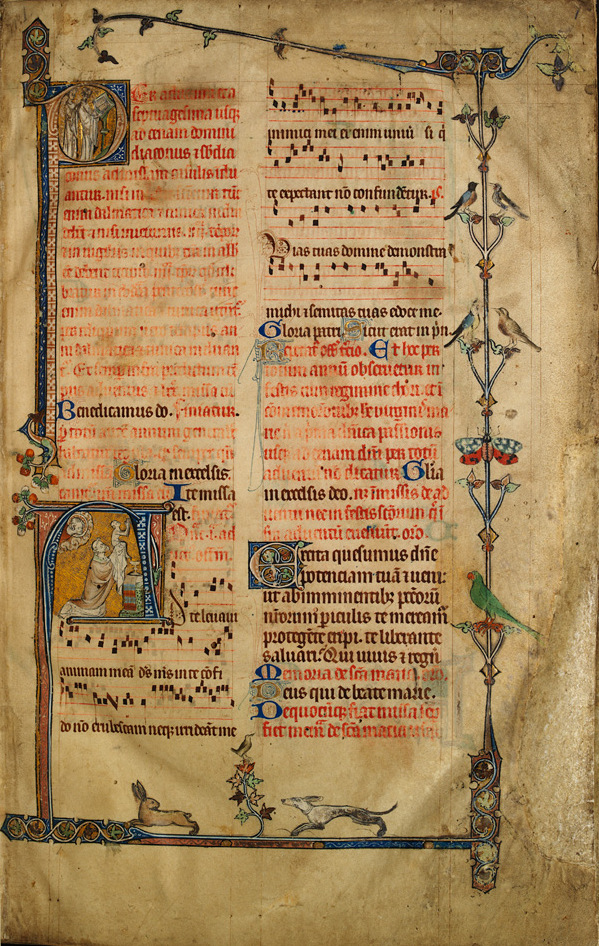
Sherbrooke Missal, folio 1r.

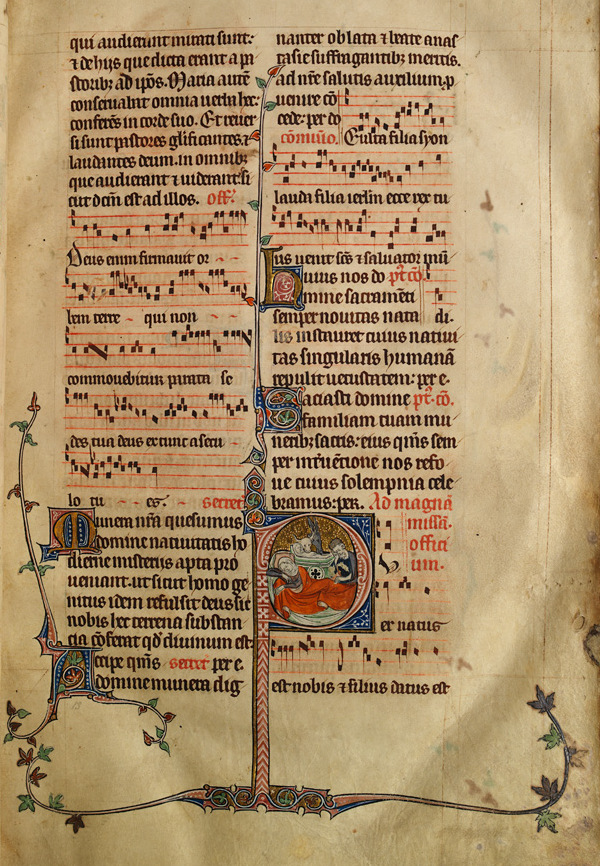
Sherbrooke Missal, folio 13r.

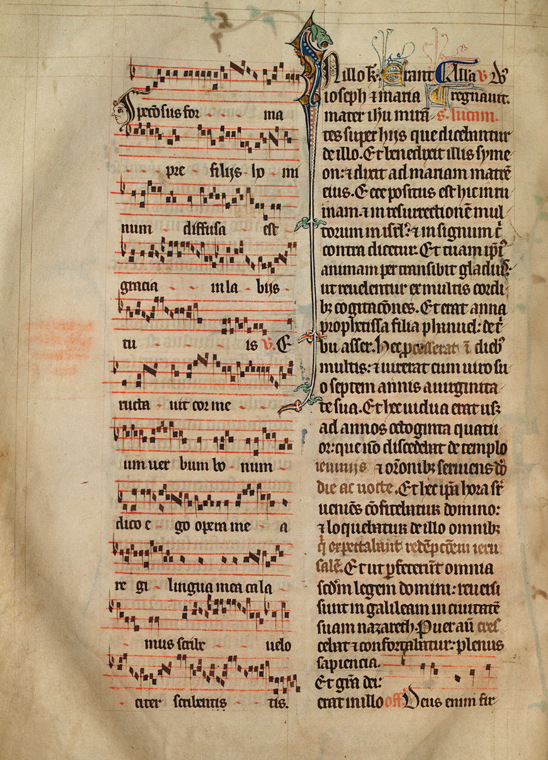
Sherbrooke Missal, folio 19v.

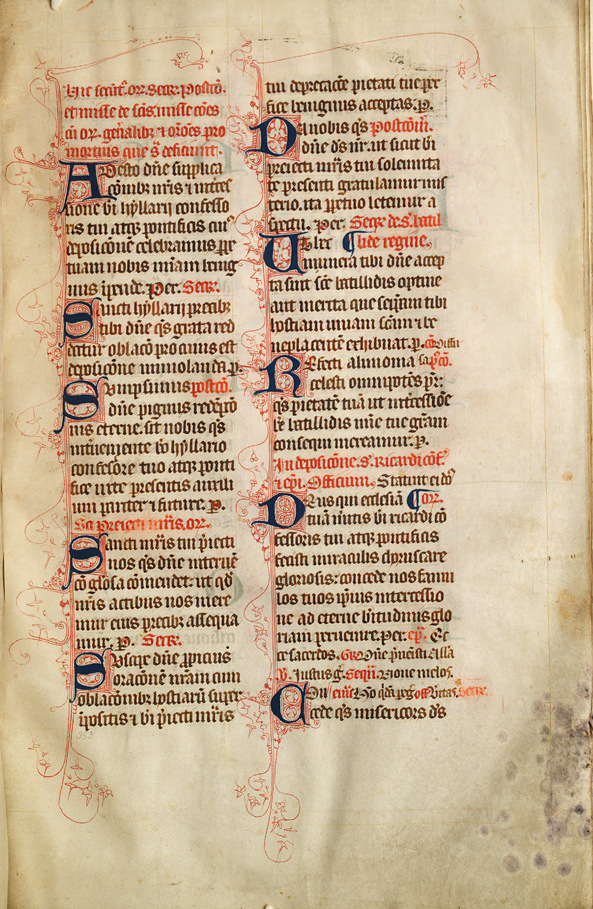
Sherbrooke Missal, folio 336r.
