= NLW MS 733B Piers Plowman =

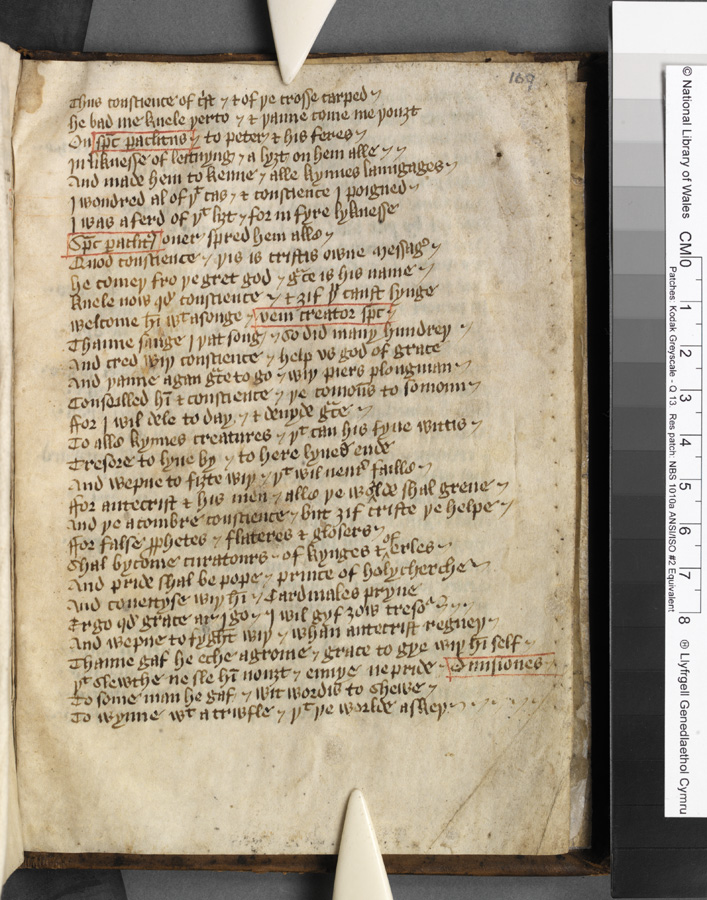
Piers Plowman. Middle English Poetry (f.169)

NLW MS 733B Piers Plowman is a version of the Middle English allegorical poem that combines text from versions 'A' and 'C'. It has been suggested that this manuscript, which dates from the first quarter of the fifteenth century, could help to track the evolution of the Piers Plowman poem.

It was part of the manuscript collection that the National Library of Wales purchased from Plas Power, Denbighshire in 1913. Like NLW MS 735C, this volume might have once belonged to the Welsh scholar and lexicographer Thomas Lloyd, and could be one of the 'three or four old manuscripts' that are referred to in the 1778 catalogue of the Plas Power library.
