= NLW MS 24029A (Boston Manuscript) =

The Boston Manuscript of the Laws of Hywel Dda is a Welsh manuscript created in south-west Wales c.1350-1400 and added to by other scribes in the later Middle Ages. The complex composition of the manuscript has been mapped by archivists at the National library Wales. It is 99 vellum leaves and 98mm by 50mm and is not illuminated, although it does use some coloured inks. It was acquired at auction at Sotherby's by the National Library of Wales in 2012 for £541,250 and is now part of the General Manuscript Collection (National Library Wales catalogue entry).

== Contents ==
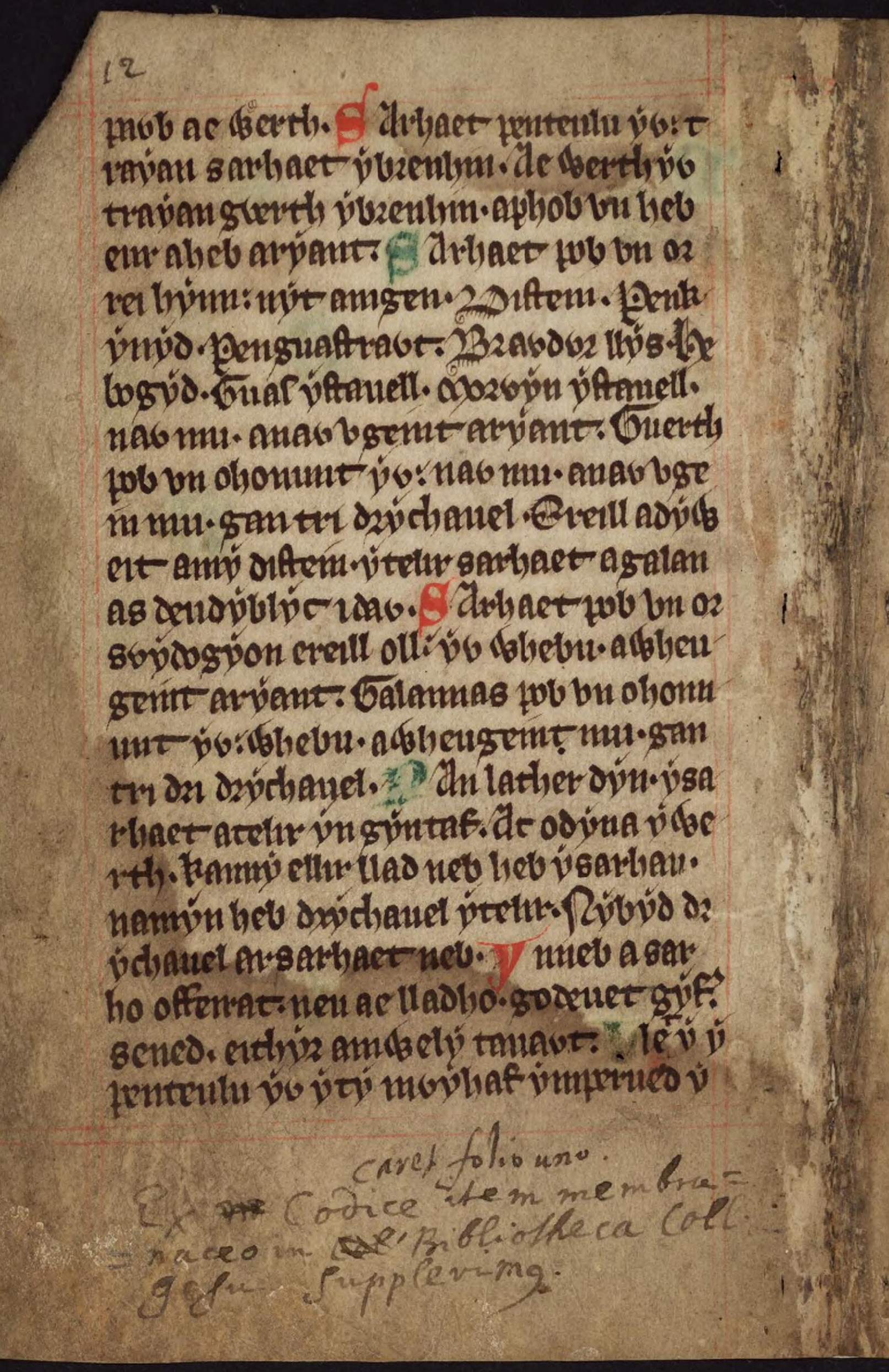
The Boston Manuscript

The manuscript contains a text of the Blegywrd redaction of medieval Welsh laws and was used as a working 'legal textbook', perhaps by itinerant Welsh legal professionals.

== History and ownership ==
William Philips of Brecon (d.1686) and his son William (d.1721) owned the manuscript and several antiquarians including Edward Lhyud consulted it and made transcriptions in the seventeenth and early eighteenth centuries. William Philip's daughter Ann inherited her father's library and probably the manuscript when he died in 1721.

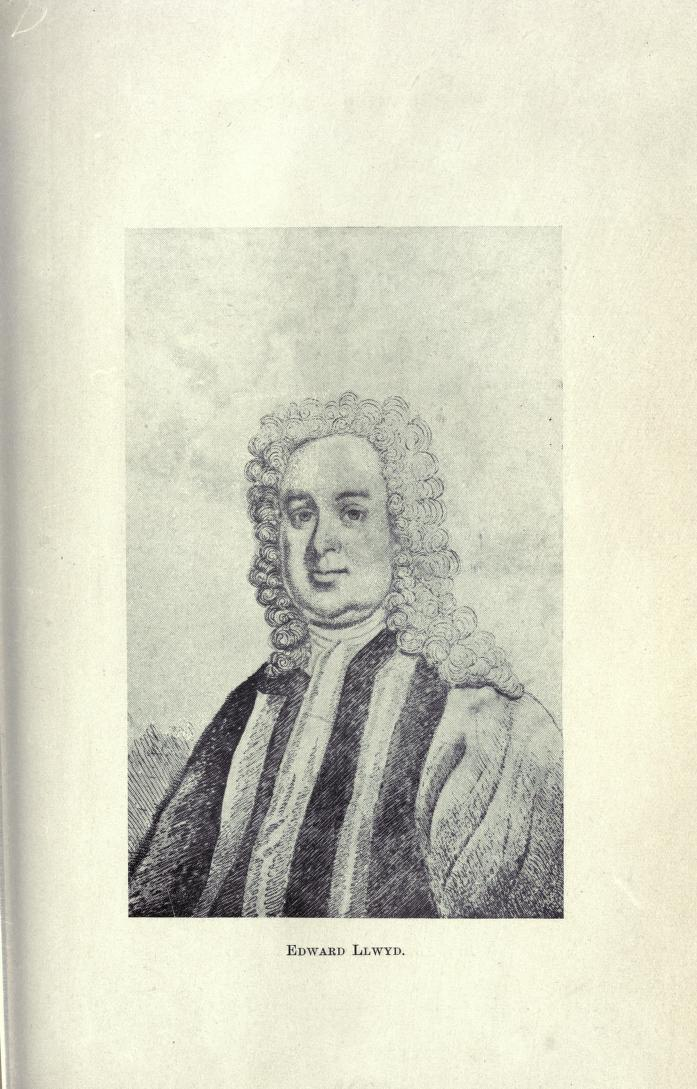
Edward Lhuyd

The manuscript was then taken to the United States, probably by Welsh settlers in the eighteenth century, and ended up in the library of the Massachusetts Historical Society in Boston. At some point in the later eighteenth or early nineteenth century, several leaves were lost and damage was done to the manuscript. It was conserved, rebound and digitised in 2012-3. Digital images and transcriptions of the manuscript are available online. It is now on display in Whitland, Carmarthenshire.
