= Daniel Silvan Evans =

Welsh clergyman, scholar and lexicographer

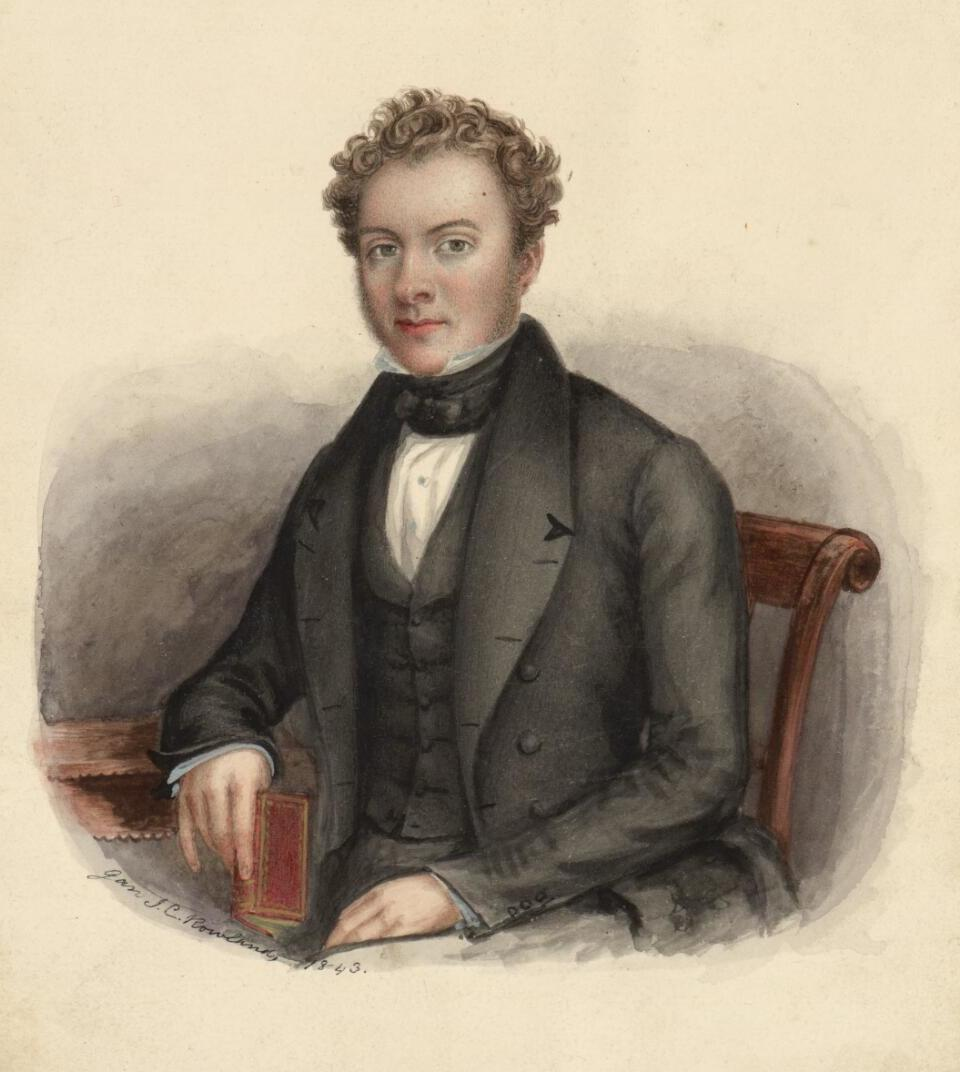
Rev. Daniel Silvan Evans

Daniel Silvan Evans (11 January 1818 – 12 April 1903) was a Welsh clergyman, scholar and lexicographer. Educated at the Independent College in Brecon, Silvan Evans worked as a schoolmaster for five years. On marriage he conformed to the Established Church, studying at St David's College, Lampeter, where he became lecturer in Welsh. Ordained deacon in 1848 and priest the following year he served curacies at Llandegwning parish in Llŷn and from 1852 to 1862 at nearby Llangian, Caernarfonshire. In 1862 he was appointed to the living of Llanymawddwy, Merioneth.

During these years Silvan Evans published Blodeu Ieuainc (1843), Telynegion (1846), edited Elfennau Gallofyddiaeth (1850), Elfennau Seryddiaith (1851). In 1853 he published Ellis Wynne's Gweledigaethau y Bardd Cwsg. He also edited Y Brython from 1858 to 1860 and published articles in Y Gwyddoniadur. 1856 saw the publication of Llythyraeth yr Iaith Gymraeg.

From Llanymawddwy Evans published Gwaith Walter Evans ("The Work of Walter Evans", i.e. Gwallter Mechain), edited Y Marchog Crwydrad: Hen Ffuglith Gymreig. In 1868 his translation of William Forbes Skene's The Four Ancient Books of Wales appeared. He edited "Gwilym Lleyn" in the Cambrian Bibliography in 1868 and published three articles in Revue Celtique in 1870 and 1875. In 1870 Silvan Evans translated a Breton liturgical text, Liherieu hag Avielei. He edited Archaeologia Cambrensis from 1871 to 1875.

In 1876 Silvan Evans was collated to the living of Llanwrin, Montgomeryshire. He assisted Thomas Stephens with his monumental composition Literature of the Kymry, co-edited a new edition of Llyfr Gweddi Cyffredin (the Book of Common Prayer in Welsh), and in 1878 edited Lewis Morris's Celtic Remains. Through his son-in-law, Benjamin Williams, Vicar of Llanover, Monmouthshire, he was associated with Lady Llanover's attempt to rekindle Welshness on her model estate. These years were saddened by the loss of six of his seven children, and by his wife's fatal accident in 1889.

From 1878 to 1884 Evans held a post as part-time Professor of Welsh at University College, Aberystwyth. Honours accrued, e.g. a D.Litt. from the University of Wales, collation as Prebendary of Llanfair (1891) and subsequently (1889) as Chancellor of Bangor Cathedral.

Evans is best known for his work on the Welsh language, including his concise English–Welsh dictionary (1858) and the extensive Dictionary (Geiriadur Cymraeg) which he began publishing in 1887 and on which he continued to work until his death, at which time he was working on the letter E. His son, John Henry Silvan Evans, joined him in his labours.

According to Thomas Parry (History of Welsh Literature to 1900), Silvan Evans coined the word "telyneg" to render the English "lyric", hence the title of an early work, Telynegion (1846), which apparently contained translations from Anacreon, Sappho, Ovid, French sonnets, and the work of English poets, especially Lord Byron. Parry judges Silvan Evans to have been overmuch influenced by William Owen Pughe's Dictionary in his use of vocabulary. However, R. E. Hughes in the Dictionary of Welsh Biography (1959) claims that Evans "gradually became emancipated" from Pughe's work.
