= NLW MS 735C Astronomy =

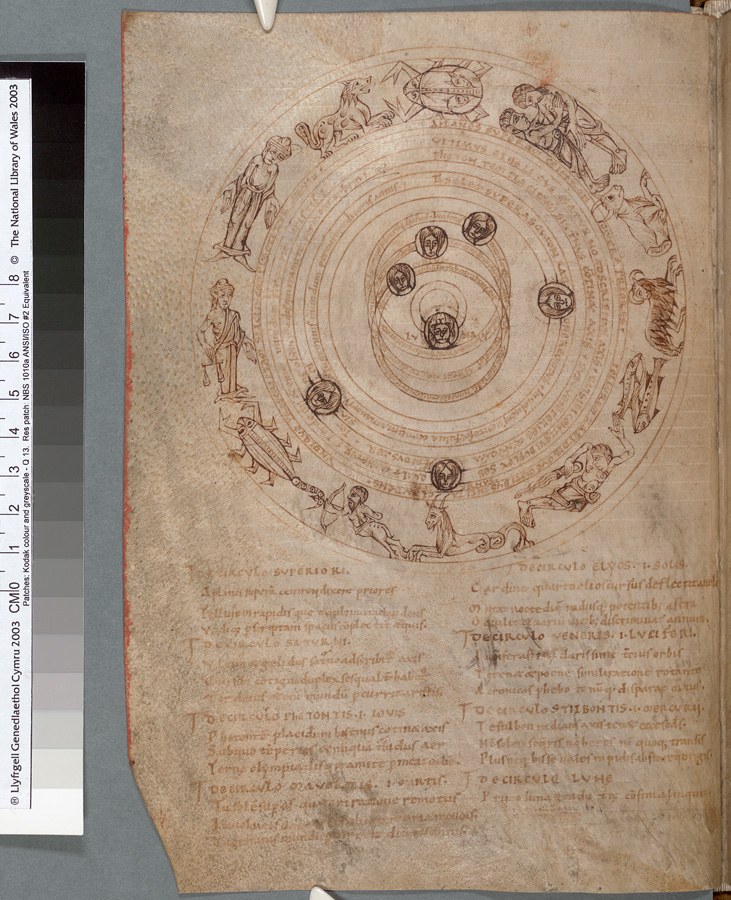
Medieval Astronomy (f.4v)

The volume NLW MS 735C comprises several Latin texts on astronomy that were copied c. 1000 to c. 1150. Thus, it is the oldest scientific manuscript in the National Library of Wales. It contains a description of the constellations in Germanicus' Latin translation of the Greek Phaenomena by Aratus, with illustrations that demonstrate the interrelatedness of myth, astronomy and astrology during the period around 1000, when this section of the manuscript was created in the Limoges area. The second section of the manuscript was completed by a scriptorium in the same part of France c. 1150.

Before the manuscript was rebound, probably in London, in the early seventeenth century, little is known about its history. It appeared in the Plas Power, Denbighshire library catalogue that was compiled in 1816 but may have already been there for some time, possibly in the possession of Thomas Lloyd (c. 1673-1734), the lexicographer who spent his last years at Plas Power. The Plas Power manuscripts were purchased by the National Library in 1913 and added to the General Manuscript Collection.
