= Four Ancient Books of Wales =

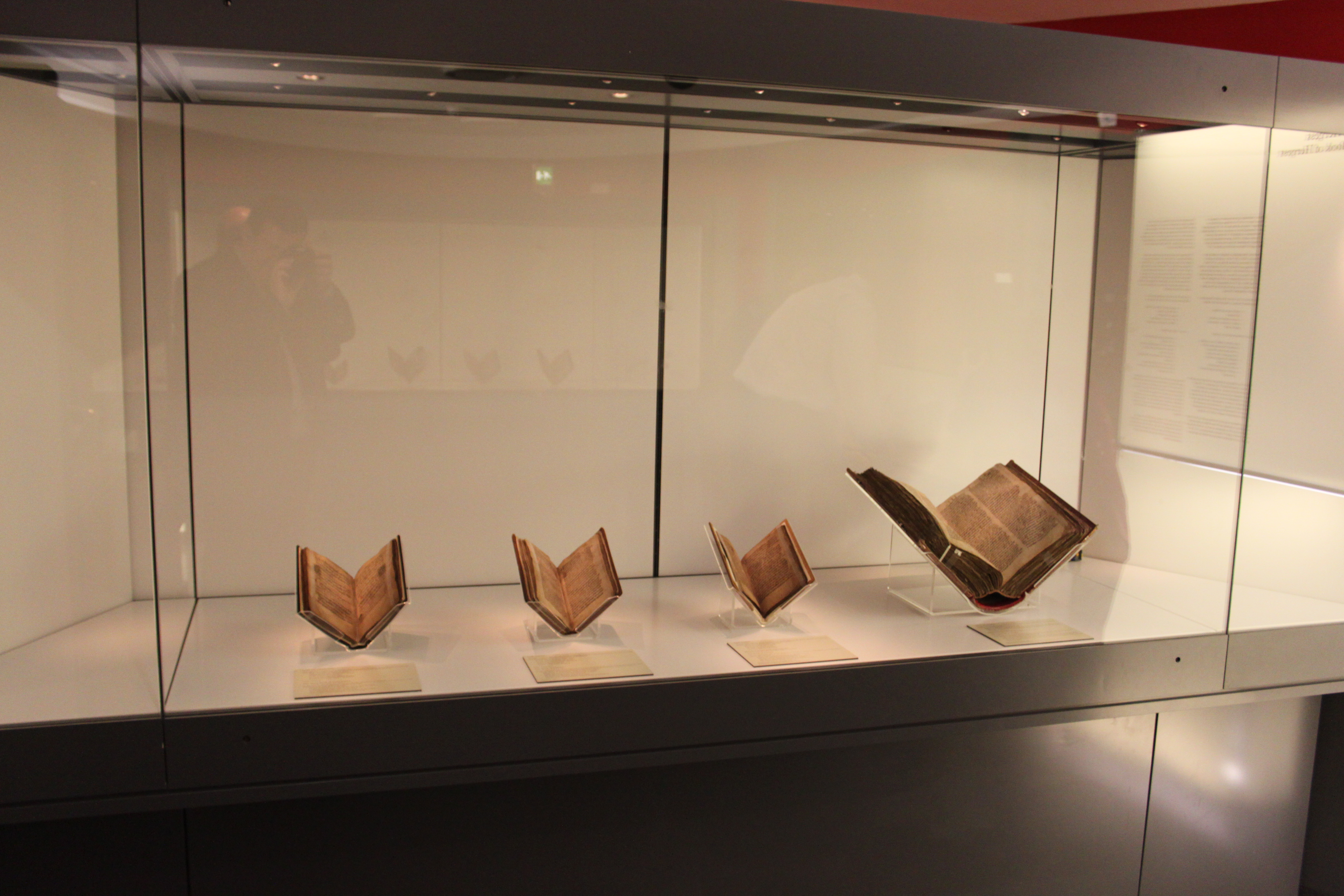
The Black Book of Carmarthen, Book of Taliesin, Book of Aneirin and Red Book of Hergest manuscripts were displayed together during the 4 Books: Welsh Icons United exhibition at the National Library of Wales between 12 October 2013 and 15 March 2014.

The Four Ancient Books of Wales is a term coined by William Forbes Skene to describe four important medieval manuscripts written in Middle Welsh and dating from the 13th, 14th, and 15th centuries. They contain primarily texts of poetry and prose, some of which are contemporary and others which may have originated from traditions dating back to as early as the sixth and seventh centuries. These also contain some of the earliest native Welsh references to King Arthur. This collection was said to be "instrumental in bringing early Welsh literature to the attention of historians, philologists, and literary scholars".

The four books included by Skene in his list are:

- The Black Book of Carmarthen
- The Book of Taliesin
- The Book of Aneirin
- The Red Book of Hergest

For the most part, the poems contained within these manuscripts are attributed to the bards Myrddin, Aneirin, Taliessin, and Llywarch Hen. The principal texts of the Four Ancient Books of Wales were edited and translated in a two volume compilation by William Forbes Skene in 1868. By the standards of modern scholarship the edition is seriously flawed with numerous transcription errors and consequently inaccurate translating. Skene enlisted the help of Daniel Silvan Evans, who was responsible for most of the translations, and Robert Williams to translate the poems.

Images from the manuscripts

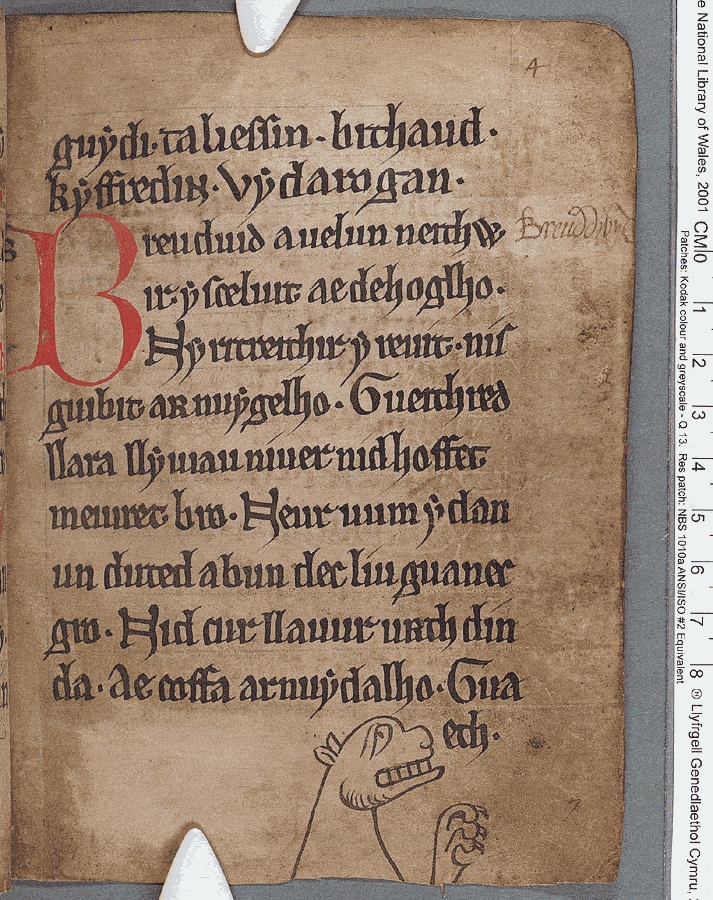
Facsimile of a page from the Black Book of Carmarthen

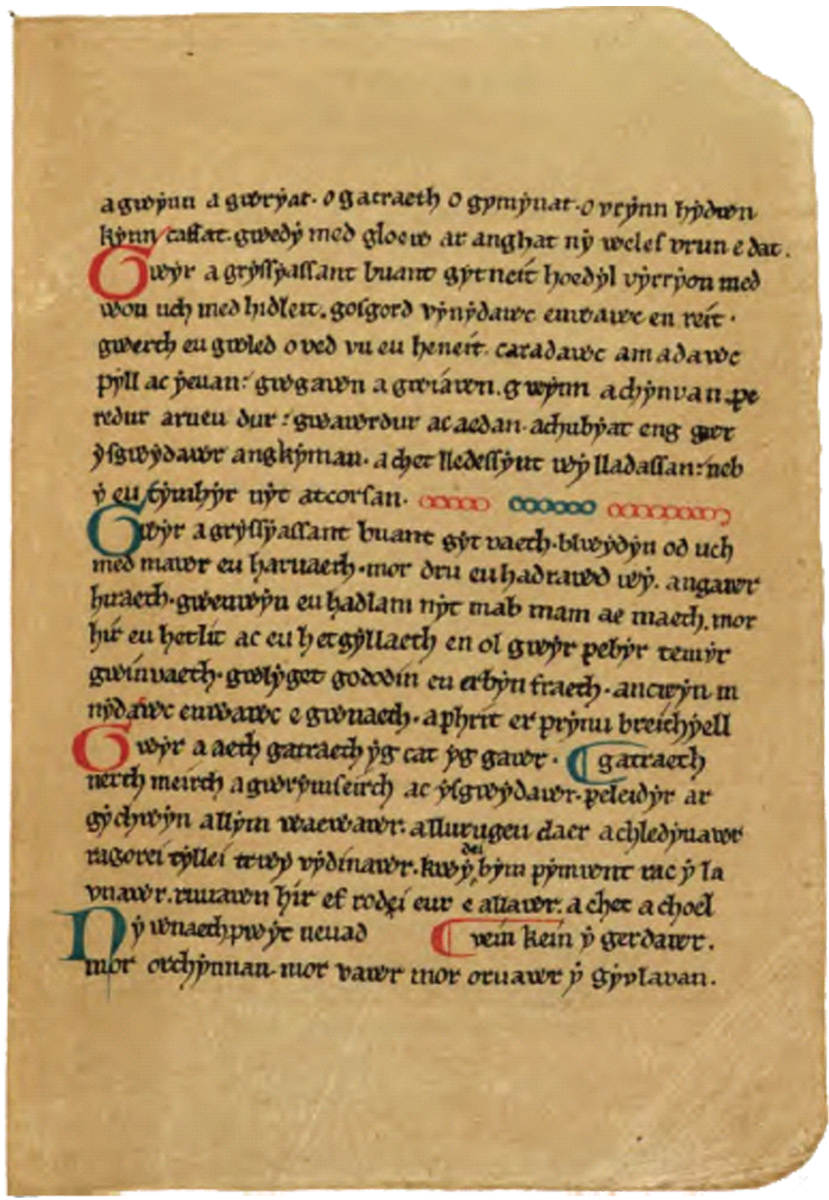
Facsimile of a page from the Book of Aneirin

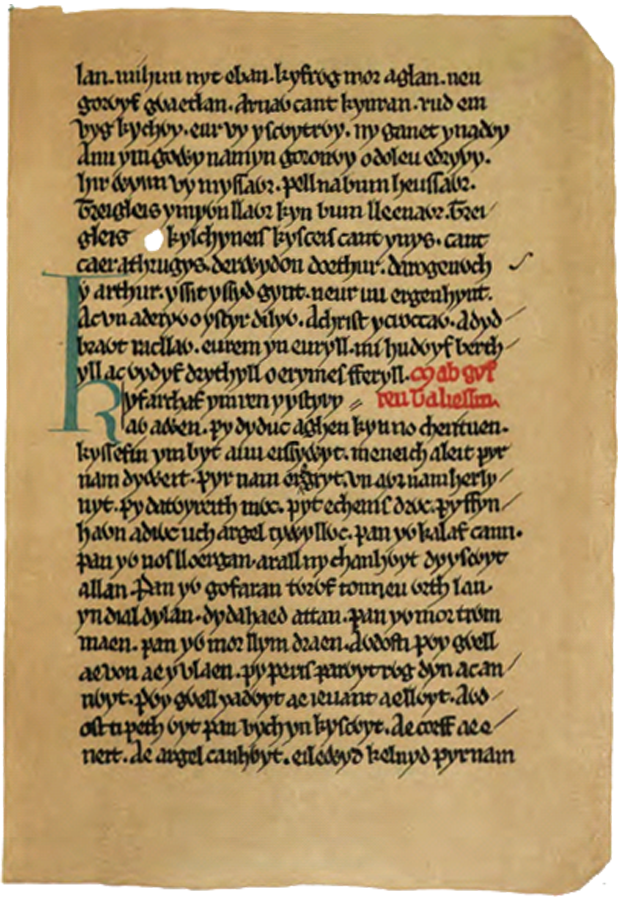
Facsimile of a page from the Book of Taliesin (Folio 13)

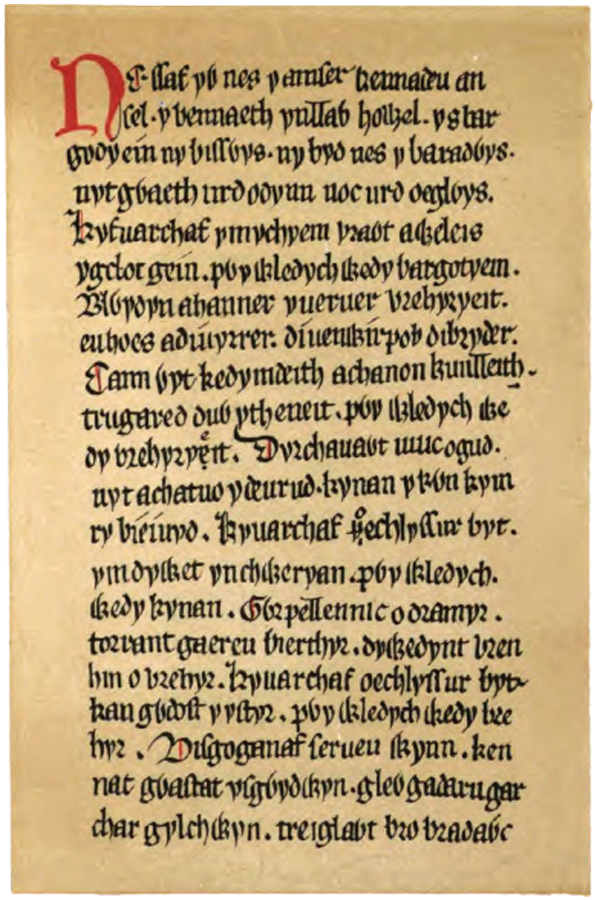
Facsimile of Part of Column 579 from the Red Book of Hergest

== History ==
These manuscripts were, for the most part unknown, until the publication of Archaeologia Britannica by Edward Lhuyd in 1707, which was also the first instance of these books being grouped together. Then, in the mid eighteenth-century, due in part to the Ossianic controversy, there was an increase in interest in Welsh poetry, which led to several subsequent publications of collections of Welsh poetry. Notable ones amongst these include Some Specimens of the Poetry of the Antient Welsh Bards by Edward Evans (1764), The History of the Anglo-Saxons by Sharon Turner, The Literature of the Kymry by Thomas Stephens (1849), and Taliesin: Or the Bards and Druids of Britain by David William Nash (1858). The last two of these were the first to provide literary analysis of the poems. The culmination of these publications set the foundations for the publication of the Four Ancient Books of Wales.

== Additional manuscripts ==
Since the term was first coined, scholars have suggested additional manuscripts be added to the list due to their historical prominence. One such manuscript is the Hendregadredd Manuscript. At the time when Skene compiled his collection, the Hendregadredd Manuscript was lost and it was not discovered until 1910, when it was found at the bottom of a wardrobe. Chardwick argued that, by the addition of the Hendregadredd Manuscript, it, as an artefact, was "by far the most revealing of [the] five books", also calling it the "most valuable palaeographical repertory of the Welsh Middle Ages".

The National Library of Wales supported the suggestion for the inclusion of the Hendregadredd Manuscript, as well as proposing the inclusion of the White Book of Rhydderch due to its similarity with the Red Book of Hergest and its inclusion of the earliest complete Mabinogi.
