= Bye-gones =

19th-century Antiquarian Journal covering Wales and border countries

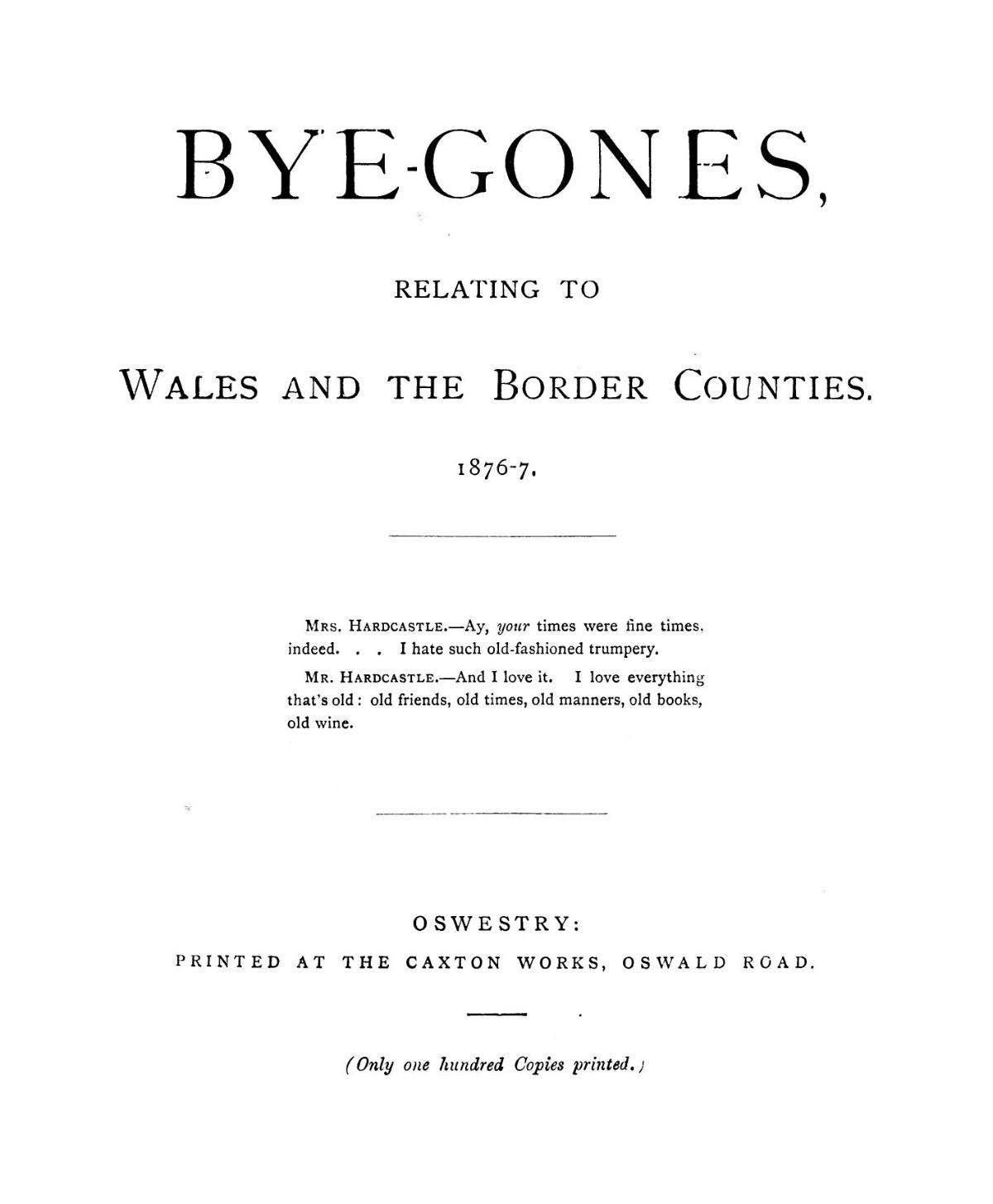
Bye-gones (Welsh journal)

Bye-gones was a 19th-century quarterly antiquarian journal which covered Wales and the border counties. It was first published in the 1871, by Woodall, Minshall and Company of Oswestry. John Askew Roberts (1826–1884) (who had previously served as the Oswestry Advertizer's editor), edited the journal, which contained antiquarian articles that had originally been published in the Oswestry Advertizer and Border Counties Herald.
