= Thomas Lloyd (lexicographer) =

Thomas Lloyd (c. 1673 – October 1734) was a Welsh cleric and lexicographer. He was the son of Thomas Lloyd, a lawyer from Wrexham and part of the Lloyd family of Llanfair Talhaearn, Denbighshire. He was educated at Jesus College, Oxford, matriculating on 25 February 1689 at the age of 15. He obtained a Bachelor of Arts degree in 1692 and his Master of Arts degree in 1695. He was ordained and was a curate in the Wrexham area, tutoring also at Chirk Castle. He was chaplain to Mary Myddelton of Croesnewydd, and lived at Plas Power which she owned. She bequeathed the property to him but he died before he inherited. He was buried in Wrexham on 22 October 1734.

The National Library of Wales has copies of some of his books and manuscripts. These include his annotated copy of John Davies's Dictionarium Duplex, with additional words and citations, used by the University of Wales when compiling the University's Welsh dictionary.
