= Henry Yates Thompson =

British newspaper proprietor (1838–1928)

- Born: 15 December 1838 near Liverpool, England
- Died: 8 July 1928 (aged 89); London, England
- Education: Trinity College, Cambridge
- Occupation: Newspaper proprietor
- Known for: Illuminated manuscript collector
- Political party: Liberal
- Spouse: Elizabeth Smith (m. 1878–1928)

Henry Yates Thompson (15 December 1838 – 8 July 1928) was a British newspaper proprietor and collector of illuminated manuscripts.

== Life and career ==
Yates Thompson was the eldest of five sons born to Samuel Henry Thompson, a banker from a leading family of Liverpool, and Elizabeth Yates, the eldest of five daughters of Joseph Brooks Yates, a West India merchant and antiquary. He was educated at Harrow and at Trinity College, Cambridge, where he won the Porson Prize for Greek verse and was a Cambridge Apostle. After graduation, Yates Thompson was called to the bar by Lincoln's Inn but never practised, choosing instead to travel extensively throughout Europe and the United States, during which time witnessed the Second Battle of Chattanooga. He served as private secretary to Earl Spencer, the Lord Lieutenant of Ireland, from 1868 until 1873, and stood unsuccessfully as a Liberal for election to the House of Commons from South Lancashire in the 1865 general election, as well as in the 1868 general election and an 1881 by-election.

=== Publisher of the Pall Mall Gazette ===
Two years after his marriage to Elizabeth Smith, the eldest daughter of publisher George Smith, in 1878, Yates Thompson's father-in-law gave him ownership of the Pall Mall Gazette. Previously a Conservative newspaper, Thompson transformed it into a Liberal publication, hiring first John Morley, then Morley's assistant, W. T. Stead, to edit the paper. He supported Stead through the controversy surrounding the editor's famous exposé of child prostitution, "The Maiden Tribute of Modern Babylon" in 1885. Yet Yates Thompson had little interest in the publishing business, and he sold the Pall Mall Gazette for £50,000 to William Waldorf Astor in 1892.

=== Manuscript collector ===
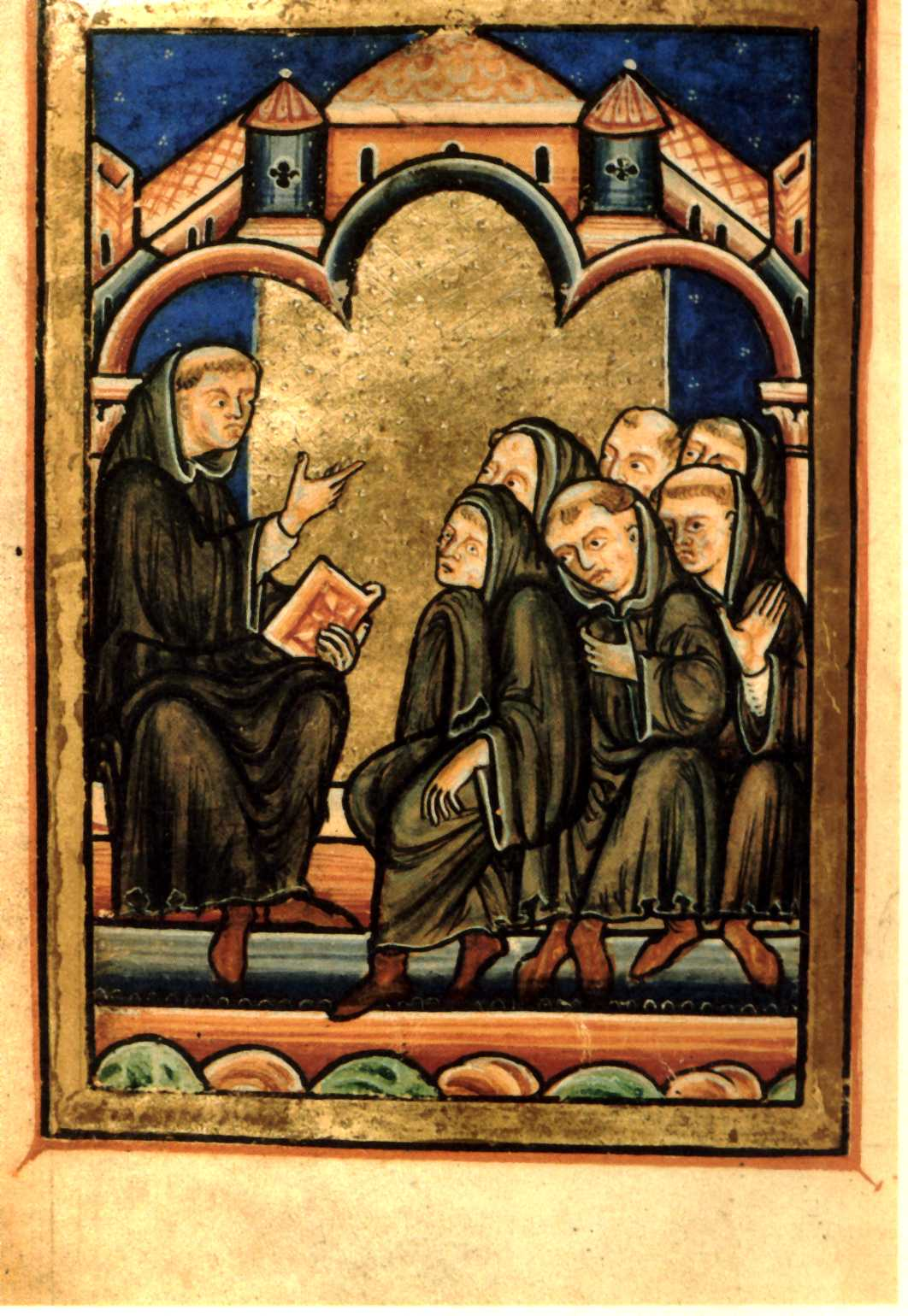
St Cuthbert teaching, British Library MS Yates Thompson 26, a manuscript of Bede's prose life of Cuthbert, copied at the priory of Durham Cathedral in the last quarter of the 12th century, with 46 full page miniatures.

Yates Thompson's sale of the Gazette allowed him to spend more time on what had become since the 1870s his primary interest, manuscript collecting. The inheritance of ten medieval manuscripts from his grandfather, Joseph Brooks Yates, in 1855 started what became a lifelong interest in manuscript collection, one that from the 1890s established Yates Thompson as the leading British manuscript collector of his day. He benefited from the dispersal of a number of collections, including those from the libraries of Sir Thomas Phillipps, Firmin Didot, John Ruskin, and the Earl of Ashburnham. He had a prodigious memory, which aided him in combining long-separated volumes and manuscripts into complete sets. Endeavoring to keep his collection manageable, he sold off lesser volumes that he acquired, improving the overall quality of his collection as a consequence. His collection was catalogued in 4 volumes between 1898 and 1912 by M.R. James and others.

He decided to refine his collection to include 100 manuscripts of the highest quality, and sold off the excess. When he was able to buy a better manuscript thereafter, he would sell one to make way for it. Many of the books that Yates Thompson collected were subsequently donated to museums, including the British Library, BnF and the Fitzwilliam Museum. He died at his London home in 1928; upon his wife's death in 1941 a larger additional collection of illuminated manuscripts was donated to the British Museum and are now in the British Library, where the 52 Yates Thompson Manuscripts from both donations are now one of the "closed collections".

Thompson twice held the annual Sandars Readership in Bibliography at Cambridge University and lectured on English and French illustrated manuscripts of the 13th–15th centuries (1901) and illustrated manuscripts of the 11th century (1904).

The Yates Thompson Manuscripts in the British Library include:

- MS 1, Fécamp Bible
- MS 2, Ottenbeuren Collectar
- MS 3, Dunois Hours
- MS 5, Tilliot Hours
- MS 13, Taymouth Hours
- MS 14, the St Omer Psalter
- MS 26, Bede, Life of St. Cuthbert
- MS 27, Hours of Yolande of Flanders
- MS 36, Dante, illustrated by Giovanni di Paolo

== Philanthropy ==
A philanthropist, Yates Thompson also donated buildings to Harrow, Sefton Park in Liverpool and Newnham College, Cambridge, and hospitals to Crewe and the Horwich railway works.

He received the Freedom of Liverpool in October 1901, in recognition of benefits he had conferred on the city, including the palm houses in Sefton and Stanley parks.

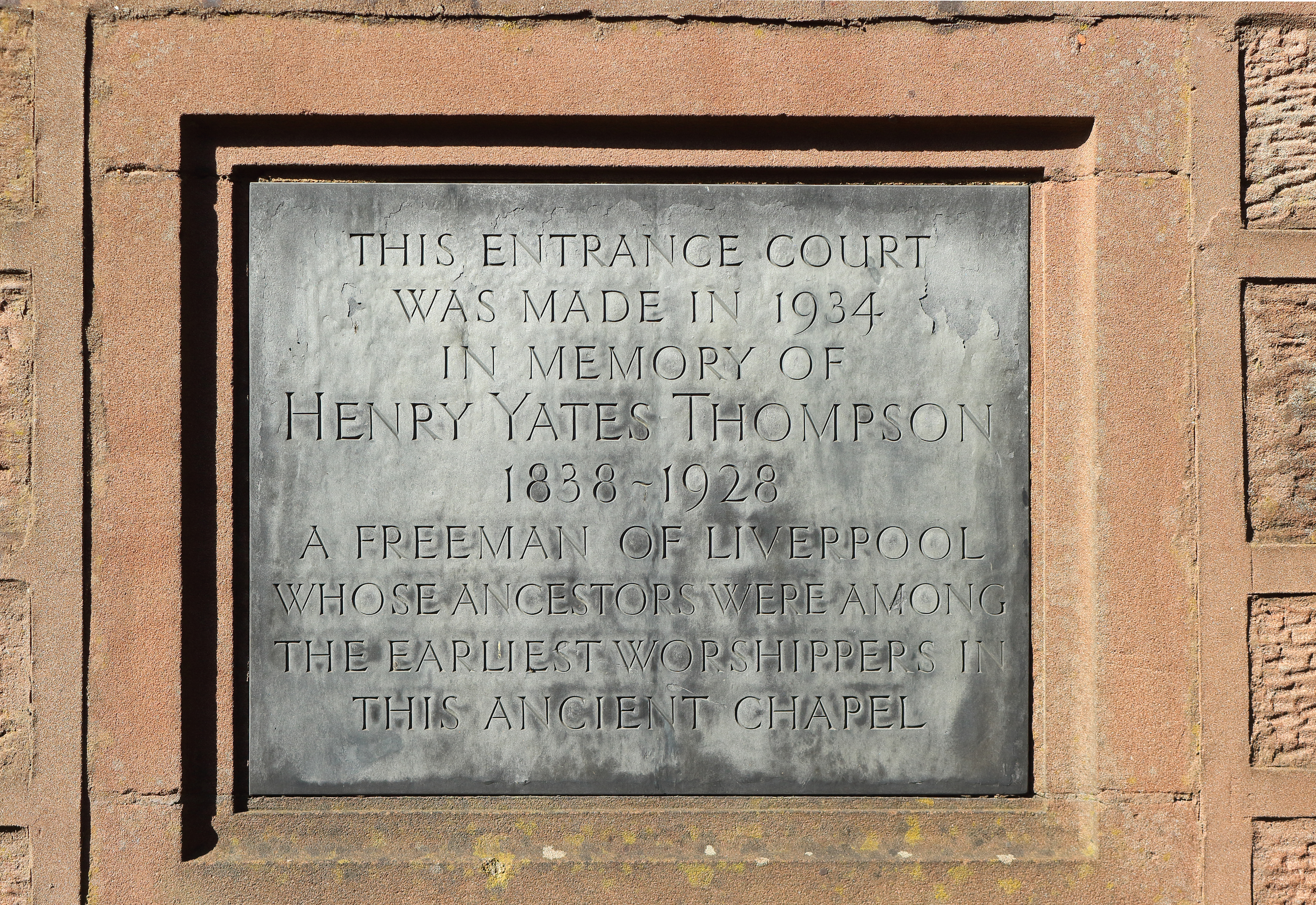
Memorial at Toxteth Unitarian Chapel
