= Manuscripts of Wales =

Wales has produced a number of manuscripts over the centuries. Although most were written in Middle Welsh or Old Welsh, some were also written in Latin. In some of the more recent manuscripts it is not uncommon to have texts in Welsh, Latin, French and English in the same volume. However, some of the most important medieval manuscripts were written in Latin only, e.g. the Cyfraith Hywel.

== History ==
The documentation of Welsh royalty begins after the departure of the Roman army from the Great Britain at the end of the 4th century, that is the era when Welsh history was first written about, specifically the list and lives of the kings ruling in Wales. Although, some of this history is considered pseudo-histories, i.e., King Arthur, whose written origins are unknown. It was from the sixth century that the Welsh documented their history, starting with Gildas who speaks of the Romans and Kings of Gwynedd. Then Nennius in the 9th century, whose actual identity has been questioned to date. Then, the 10th century King of Deheubarth, Owain ap Hywel Dda helped write the Annals of Wales (Latin: Annales Cambriae) by using Nennius' research to record the years 447 – 947. And finally, Brut y Tywysogion was compiled, and was written after the 14th century, covering the years 682 – 1332 in medieval Wales. The Brut was considered to be a Welsh translation of the lost Latin work Cronica Principum Wallie (Chronicles of the Princes of Wales), which itself was based on the works compiled by Christian monks, specifically the Cistercian monastery, Strata Florida Abbey in Ceredigion. These written works give an insight into medieval Wales.

== Collections ==
There are several compilations of Welsh manuscripts. The most important, from a Welsh-language literature standpoint, are:

- National Library of Wales General Manuscript Collection
  - Cwrtmawr Manuscripts, in the National Library of Wales collection
  - Llansteffan Manuscripts, in the National Library of Wales collection
  - Peniarth Manuscripts, in the National Library of Wales collection

== Individual manuscripts ==
- Hendregadredd Manuscript (National Library of Wales); circa 1300-1330s
- Juvencus Manuscript (Cambridge University Library; 9th-10th century)
- Book of the Anchorite of Llanddewibrefi (Bodleian Library, Oxford)
- Book of Aneirin
- Book of Bicar Woking
- Book of Red Asaph
- Red Book of Hergest (Jesus College, Oxford; 14th century)
- Red Book of Nannau
- Red Book of Talgarth
- Black Book of Basingwerk
- Black Book of Carmarthen (National Library of Wales, Aberystwyth; 13th century)
- Black Book of Chirk
- Black Book of Tyddewi
- White Book of Corsygedol
- White Book of Hergest
- White Book of Rhydderch (around 1325)
- Book of Llandaf
- Lichfield Gospels
- Book of Taliesin (Peniarth 2)
- Peniarth 6 (National Library of Wales; second half of the 13th century perhaps)
- Peniarth 20
- Peniarth 28 (National Library of Wales; 13th century)

== Bibliography ==
- Daniel Huws, Llyfrau Cymraeg 1250-1400 (National Library of Wales, Aberystwyth, 1993). Lecture of Sir John Williams.
