= Peniarth 20 =

Welsh manuscript of c. 1330

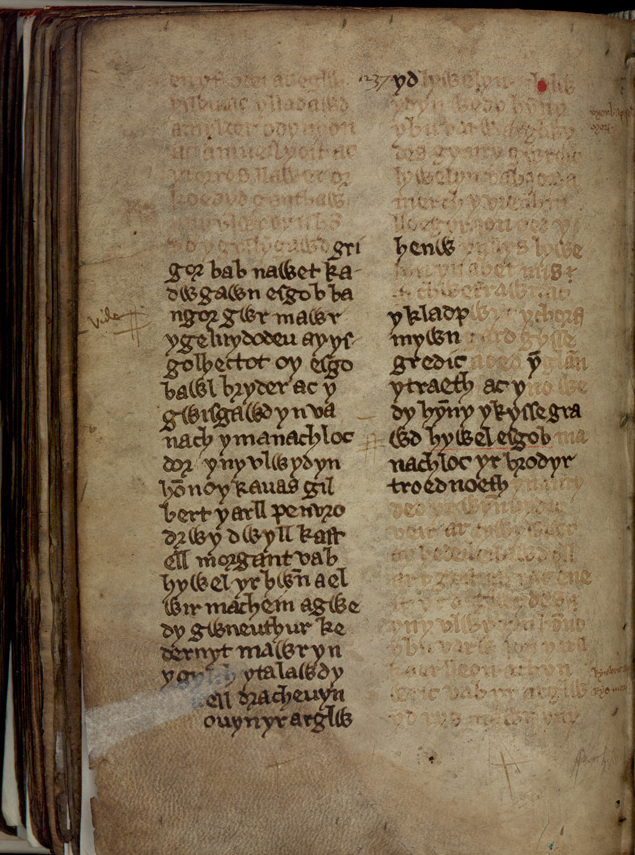
Peniarth Ms. 20, folio 260v. (c.1330). This manuscript is the earliest copy of Brut y Tywysogion, a Welsh translation of a lost Latin work, the Cronica Principium Wallie.

Peniarth 20 is an early Welsh manuscript written on parchment that is part of the Peniarth collection in the National Library of Wales. It is also known as the Chronicle of the Princes because it contains an important version of the chronicle Brut y Tywysogion. Daniel Huws, the leading authority on Welsh manuscripts, has argued that the majority of Peniarth 20 dates from circa 1330. A date around the 15th century had previously been offered by J. Gwenogvryn Evans.

The Peniarth 20 manuscript contains four texts: the earliest known copy of Brut y Tywysogion, early religious prose in Y Bibl Ynghymraec, the poem Kyvoesi Myrddin a Gwenddydd (The prophecy of Myrddin and Gwenddydd) is a dialogue between Merlin and his sister Gwenddydd, and a text of bardic grammar which summarises the instructions given to pupils during their training to become professional poets. The version of Brut y Tywysogion from Peniarth 20 is also found in The Black Book of Basingwerk.

== See also ==
- The Black Book of Basingwerk
- White Book of Hergest
- White Book of Rhydderch
- Red Book of Hergest
