= Peniarth 51 =

15th-century Welsh manuscript

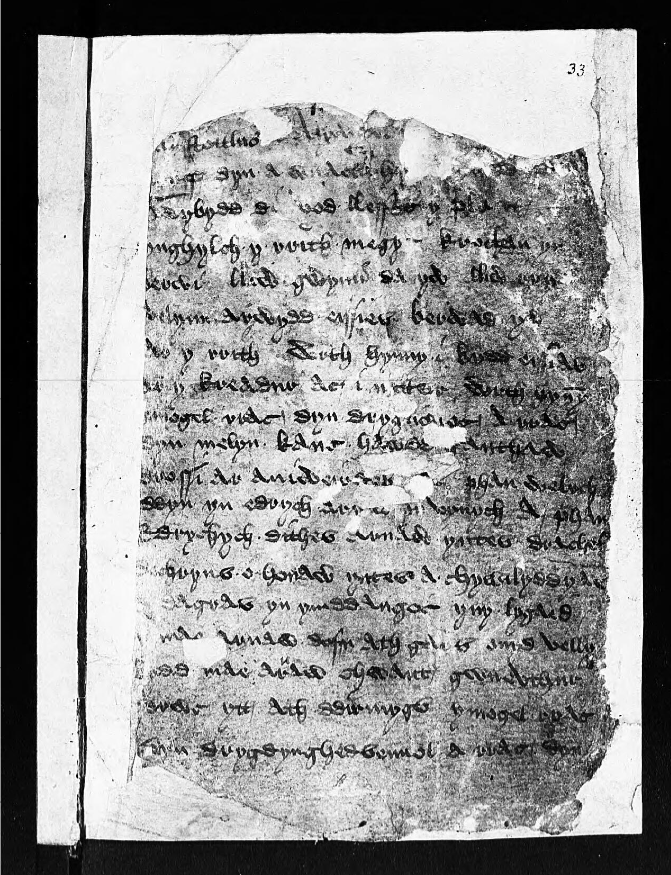

Peniarth 51, otherwise known as Llyfr Gwilym Tew ('the book of Gwilym Tew'), is a Welsh manuscript written in the second half of the 15th century. It is mostly in the hand of the bard Gwilym Tew. Although it is known that Gwilym wrote other manuscripts, Peniarth 51 is the only entire manuscript that can be proven to have been his work. It is kept in the National Library of Wales, Aberystwyth, as part of the Peniarth Manuscripts collection.

The texts contained in the manuscript include a poetic vocabulary compiled by Gwilym, drawing on sources such as the Book of Aneirin, which he possessed at the time, and Bwystori Serch, his own translation of the French text Bestiaire d'Amour by Richard de Fournival. Also included are historical triads and poetry by Dafydd ap Gwilym, Iolo Goch and Rhys Brydydd.

During the 16th century the manuscript was the property of the poet and genealogist Gruffudd Hiraethog, who may have acquired it from his friend and teacher Lewys Morgannwg. The signature of the poet Roger Kyffin (c. 1587 – 1609) from Denbighshire is in the manuscript. It became part of Robert Vaughan's Hengwrt library and then the Peniarth library.

== Bibliography ==
- Graham C. G. Thomas, A Welsh Bestiary of Love (Dublin, 1988), pp. xviii–xix.
