= Elizabeth Baker (diarist) =

British diarist

Elizabeth Baker (c. 1720 – c. 1797) was an English secretary, diarist, and amateur geologist.

== Life ==
Baker was from the English Midlands, where her father was a minister. She lived for a time in Coventry, Warwickshire.

She moved to Wales in 1770 to prospect for metals in the Dolgellau area of Merionethshire, but did not have the financial support of her partners to be able to complete the endeavour. She obtained a position with Hugh Vaughan (Note: Hugh Vaughan was the great-great grandson of antiquary Robert Vaughan.) as his secretary at Hengwrt until 1778. She lived there until his property was taken on behalf of his creditors. Baker then lived in Bryn Adda for about six years, followed by Dolgellau. She documented her experiences in ten diaries, which were held by the National Library of Wales, and excerpts were published in its journal. They are considered notable for the documentation of the history of the area. Vaughan was a solicitor, and her diary documents some of his legal proceedings.

Correspondence that was archived with her diaries show that she was alive until 1797. She is believed to be the Elizabeth Baker who was buried in Dolgellau in 1799. (Note: The Dictionary of Welsh Biography states that she died on 26 November 1789, and was buried in the Dolgellau churchyard.) Identified as Mrs. Baker, her papers and diaries from the period from 1740 to 1798 were archived at the National Library of Wales.
