= Peniarth 109 =

15th-century Welsh manuscript

Peniarth 109 is a Welsh manuscript dating to the second half of the 15th century (c. 1425 – c. 1490) in the hand of the poet Lewis Glyn Cothi. It is part of the Peniarth Manuscripts collection at the National Library of Wales.

The parchment manuscript measures 238 × 99 mm, and includes 96 leaves. It is an autograph by Lewis Glyn Cothi, among the greatest of the Poets of the Nobility (Beirdd yr Uchelwyr), which contains 106 poems. The manuscript is decorated with many illustrations, some in colour, of a noble family crests Welsh, a fact that is testament to the poet's interest in heraldry and genealogy.

It is possible that it was produced in honour of Lord William Herbert (d. 1469), founder of the family of Herbert, as an ode to him is found in the early volumes, with another ode to his brother Richard following.

There is no music that can be dated to the 1480s in the collection. The latest datable poems belong to the late 1470s, and it is fair to conclude that the manuscript was completed around this date.
