= John Gwenogvryn Evans =

British paleographer (1852–1930)

John Gwenogvryn Evans M.A., D.Litt.
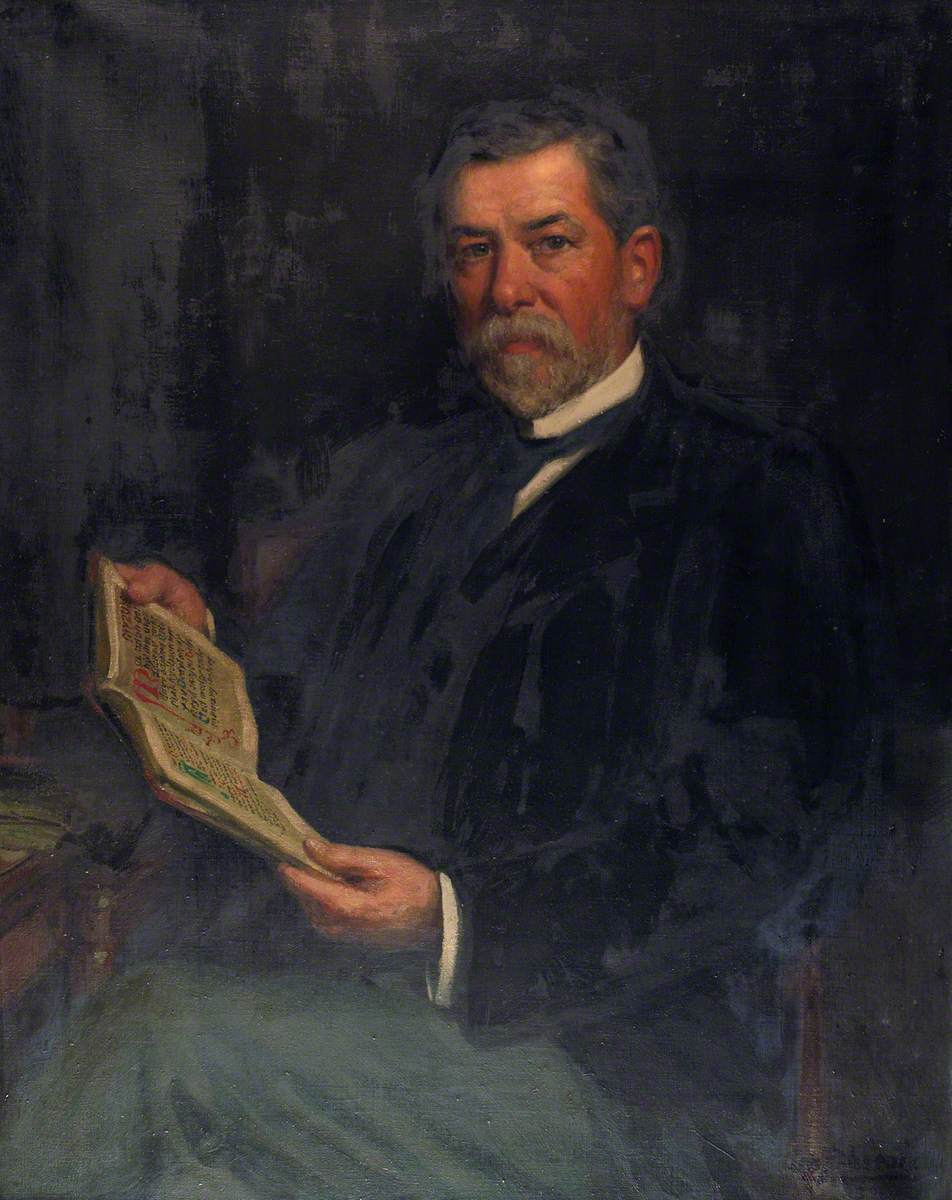
- Portrait of Evans in 1923 by George Phoenix.
- Born: March 20, 1852; Llanybydder, Carmarthenshire, Wales
- Died: March 25, 1930 (aged 78); Llanbedrog, Caernarfonshire, Wales
- Occupations: Palaeographer and translator
- Spouse: Edith Hunter (married 1877)
- Children: Emrys Evans; Tringad Evans; Myfanwy Evans

John Gwenogvryn Evans (20 March 1852 – 25 March 1930) was a Welsh palaeographic expert and literary translator. His work on medieval Welsh manuscripts constituted a substantial number of translations; he was awarded a Doctor of Letters from both the University of Oxford and the University of Wales for his contributions to the field of Welsh literature.

Born in Wales in 1852, Evans grew up speaking Welsh and only began learning English at the age of 19. He studied to be a Unitarian minister and led multiple congregations until his poor health required him to stop preaching. He then turned to manuscript research and translation, which became the primary focus of most of his professional life.

Evans is most well known for his handwritten reproductions of intricate lettering and iconography in his translations, as well as his rivalry with John Morris-Jones and his role in establishing the National Library of Wales. His body of work is currently housed by the National Library.

== Early life ==
Evans was born at Llanybydder in Carmarthenshire. When he was one year old, his family moved to Llanwenog, Cardiganshire (now called Ceredigion). Evans adopted his second name, Gwenogvryn, in honor of Llanwenog – the town is home to St. Gwenog's Church, a Grade I listed medieval church and the only one named after St. Gwenog. Evans contracted typhoid fever as a child and suffered lifelong health issues as a result. His first language was Welsh.

When he was 16, Evans was apprenticed to his uncle David Rees, who worked as a grocer in Lampeter. He returned to school two years later after an accident. While studying in Llandysul, one of his teachers was the minister William Thomas (Gwilym Marles). He also studied under antiquarian and Welsh manuscript collector Alcwyn C. Evans in Carmarthen.

Evans began learning English at the age of 19. In 1872, he enrolled at the Presbyterian College in Carmarthen, travelling to England to work as a school assistant for a year before becoming an ordained Unitarian minister in 1876. After graduating, he worked as a pastor in Carmarthen.

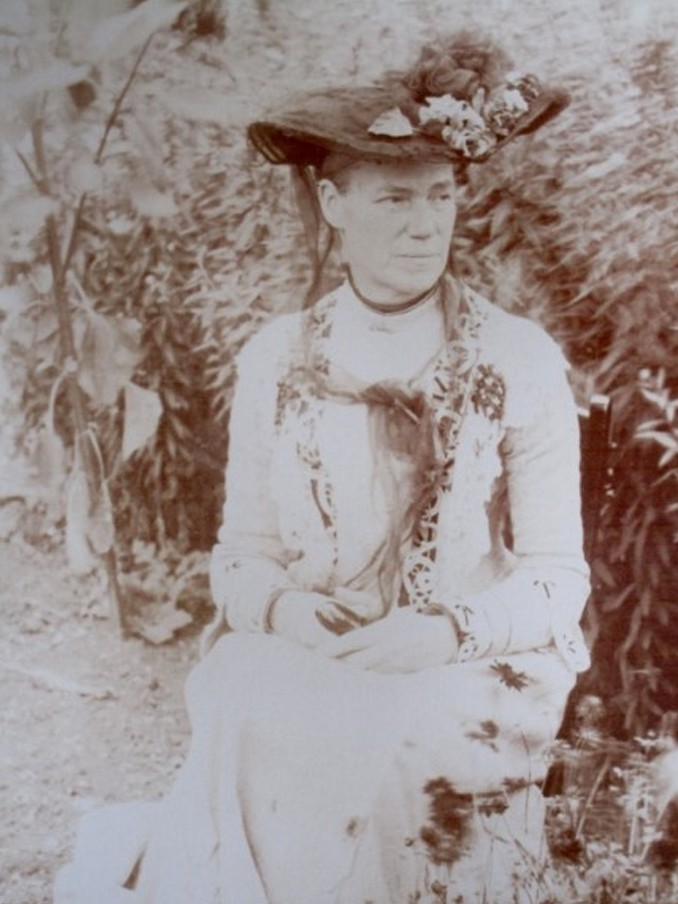
Photograph of Edith Hunter. Year unknown.

In 1877, Evans married animal rights activist Edith Hunter (1846–1923). Hunter was the secretary of the Carmarthen branch of the RSPCA, and she had spent the past two years organizing petitions to Parliament and bringing prosecutions surrounding animal welfare, particularly the treatment of donkeys used to collect cockles. Her father was the principal of Presbyterian College. They moved to Preston, Lancashire that same year, where Evans continued to preach.

== Scholarly career ==
Lasting complications of his childhood typhoid fever meant Evans lost his voice in 1880 and had to give up his Preston ministry. He began studying natural science at Owens College in Manchester, but by the end of the year he moved to Oxford. He was unable to seek a degree due to worsening health and tuberculosis.

Evans's doctors recommended he travel for his health, so he left on a ship to Australia in the fall of 1881, spending the next year abroad in Australia and Switzerland. Evans and some of his fellow passengers – like many other people on lengthy ship journeys in the 19th century – created their own periodical while sailing from Melbourne; when he returned to England in 1882, he turned the writing into his first publication: The ‘Homeward Bound’: an occasional paper published at sea during the voyage of the ship ‘Sobraon’ from Melbourne to London, 1882.

Once home in Oxford, Evans began attending lectures from Welsh scholar John Rhŷs, who was the first professor of Celtic at the University of Oxford. Rhŷs's talks on the Mabinogion reignited Evans's interest in ancient Welsh manuscripts; he had studied them years before under Alcwyn C. Evans in Carmarthen. Evans had also read the "Four Ancient Books of Wales" translated by William Forbes Skene.

In the far-away 'seventies' I bought a copy of the Four Ancient Books of Wales. After 'looking' at the Welsh text with blank amazement I placed the two volumes reverently on my shelves. My admiration for their editor knew no bounds, for did he not understand and translate the whole? I read the prolegomena with unquestioning faith, and felt humiliated that it had been left to a Scot to render such service to Welsh studies.

— John Gwenogvryn Evans, Poems from the Book of Taliesin, Preface

He was inspired to create his own translation of the "Red Book of Hergest," one of the four ancient books, as well as a collection of Welsh proverbs. The latter won a prize for poetry and prose at the National Eisteddfod of Wales in 1884.

=== Manuscript research ===
Evans then began publishing a series of facsimiles of major medieval Welsh manuscripts, setting up his own printing press to create them. After the release of the first volume, "Series of Old Welsh Texts," in 1887, he was awarded an honorary master's degree by the University of Oxford.

Evans spent the rest of his career transcribing and publishing Welsh texts – often including hand drawn reproductions of the manuscripts' intricate lettering and imagery. He frequently partnered with Rhŷs until his death in 1915, and the two published several major works in medieval Welsh literature.

Some of Evans's handwritten reproductions of lettering in The Black Book of Carmarthen

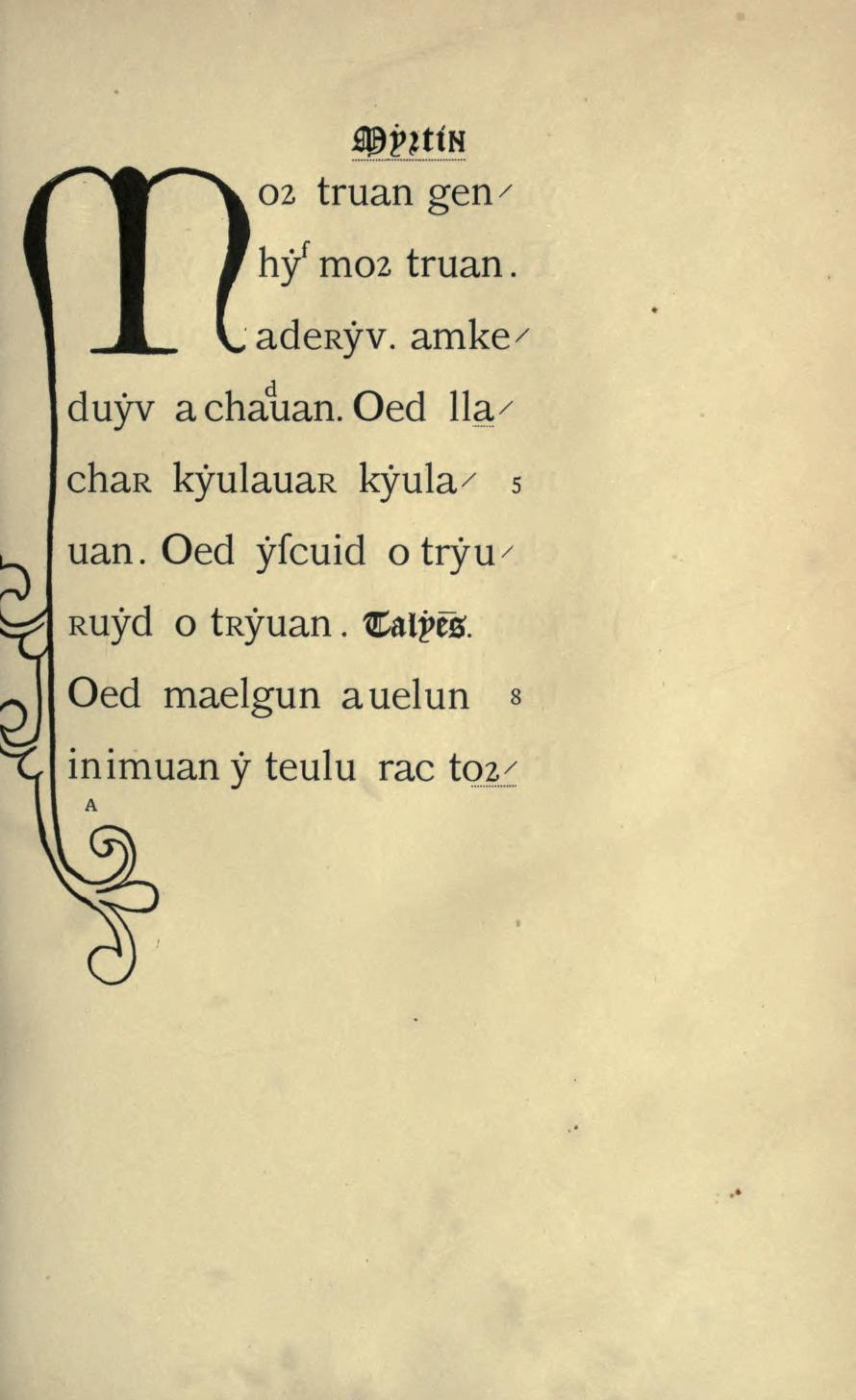
Page 1.

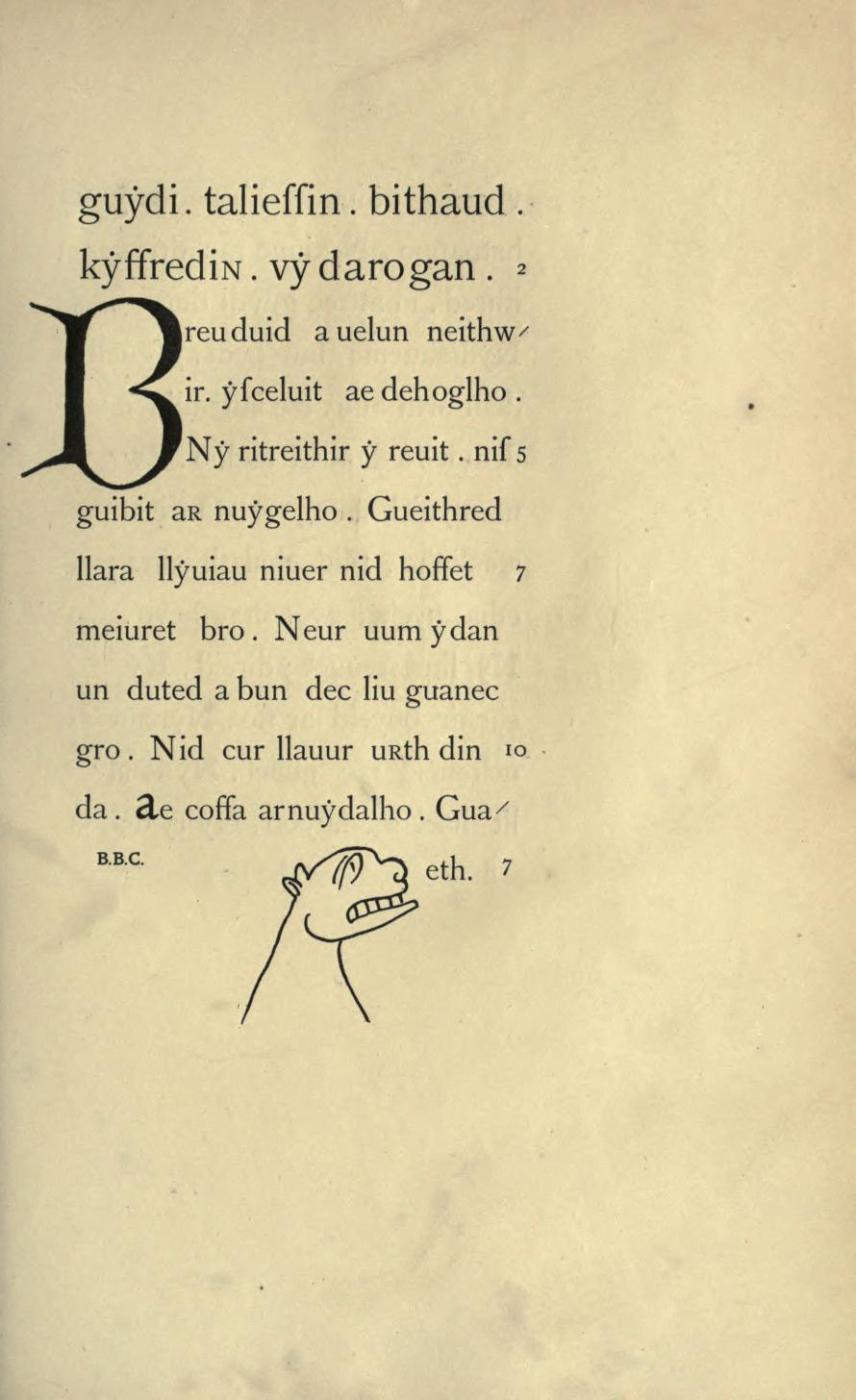
Page 7.

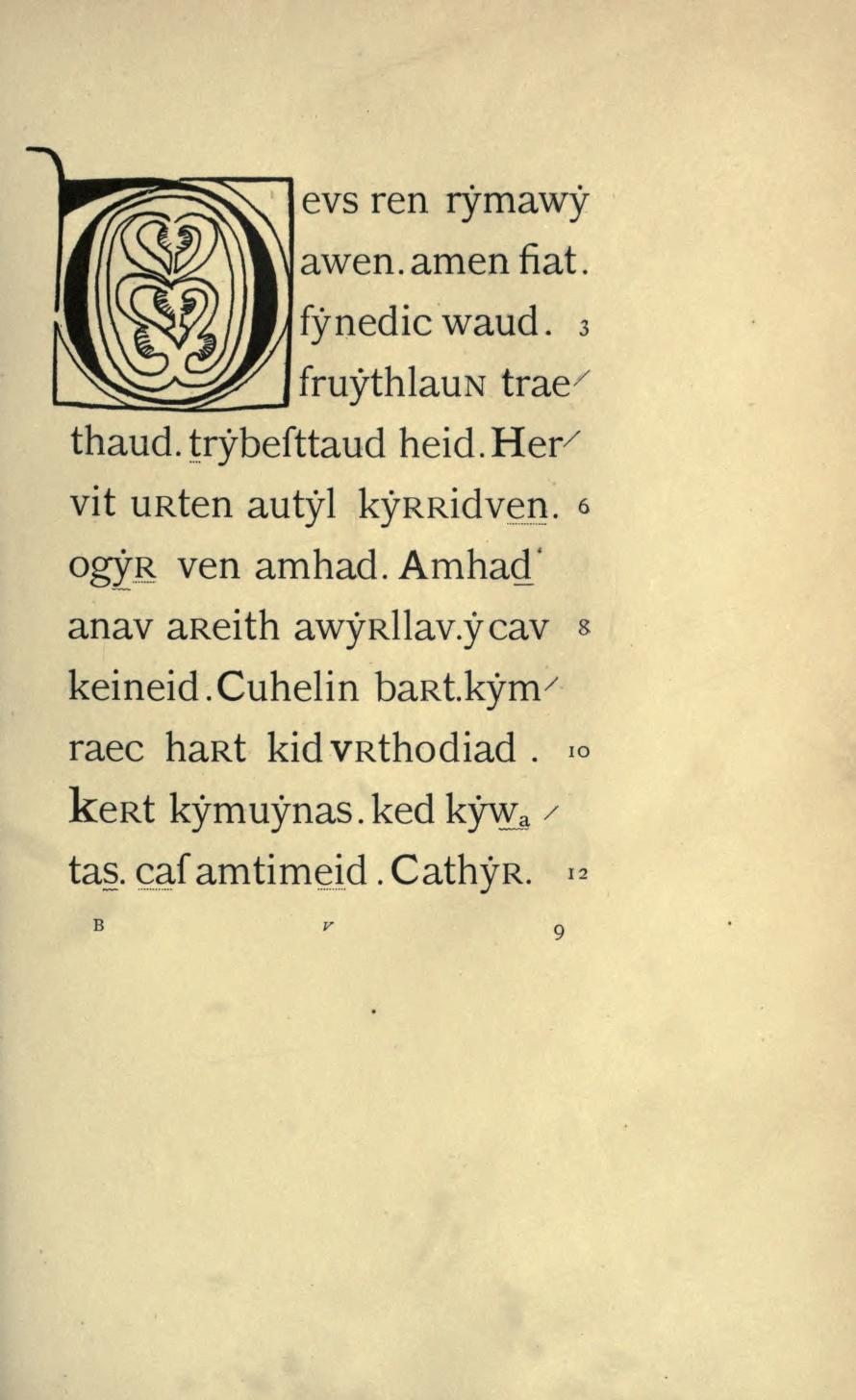
Page 9.

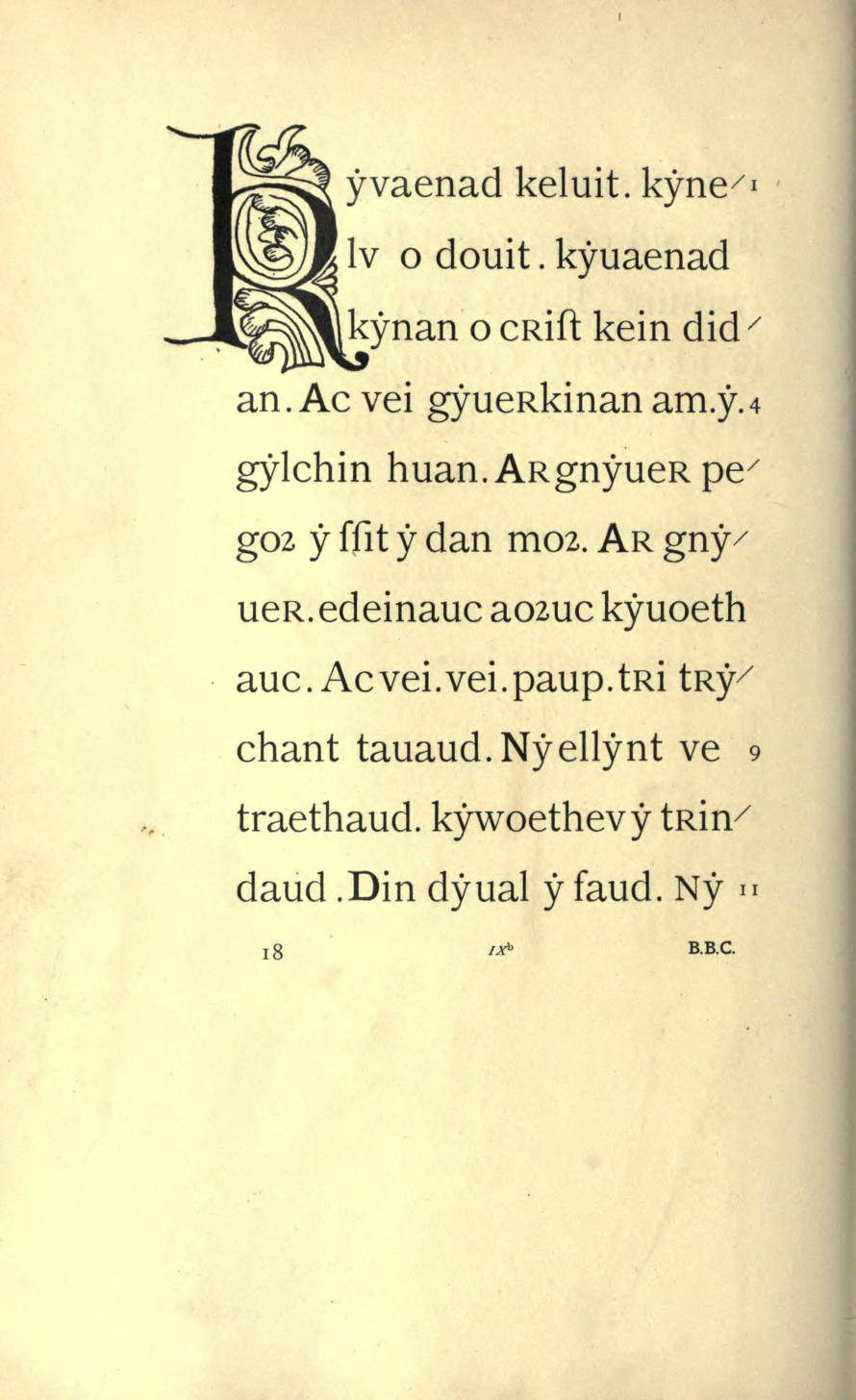
Page 18.

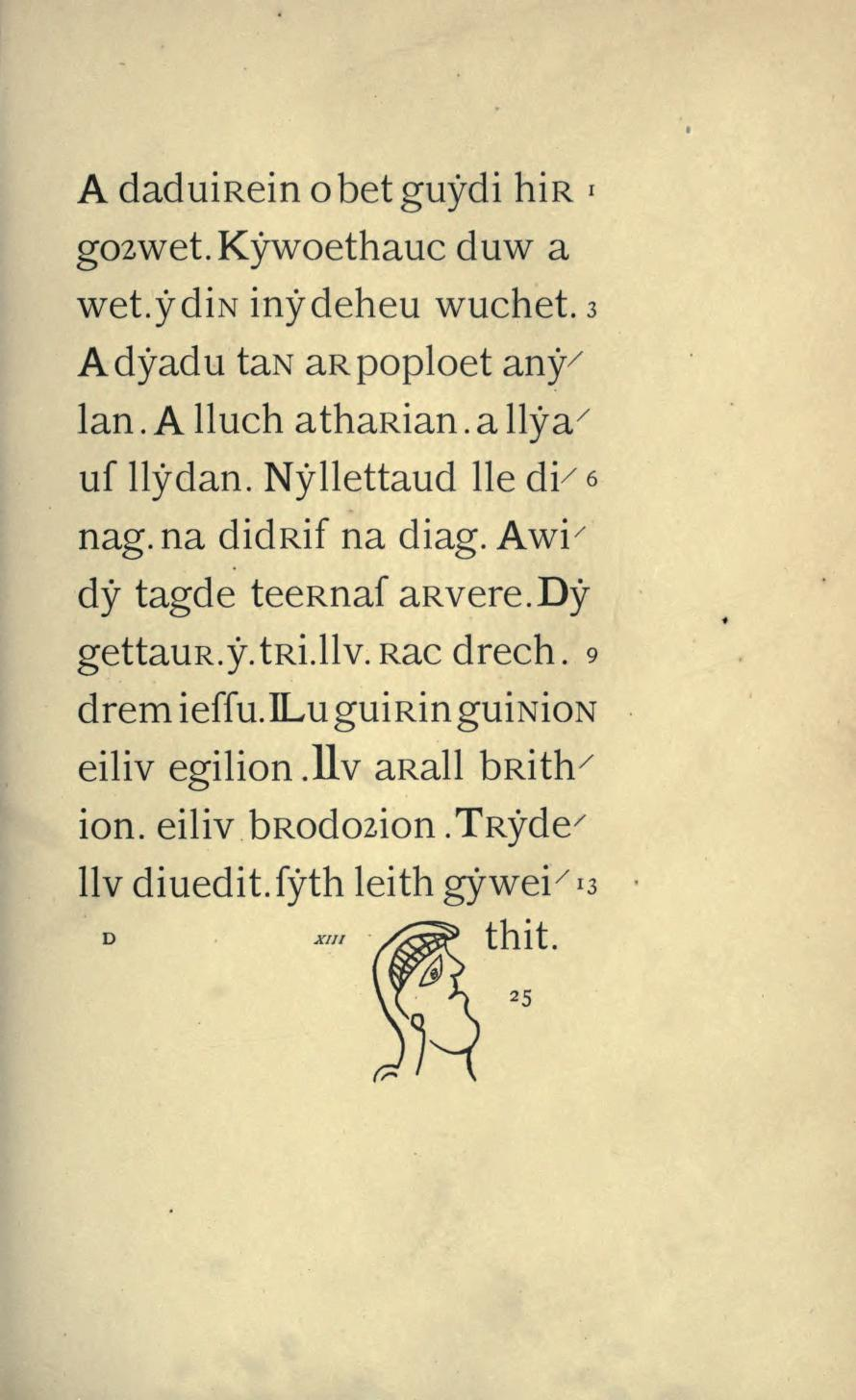
Page 25.

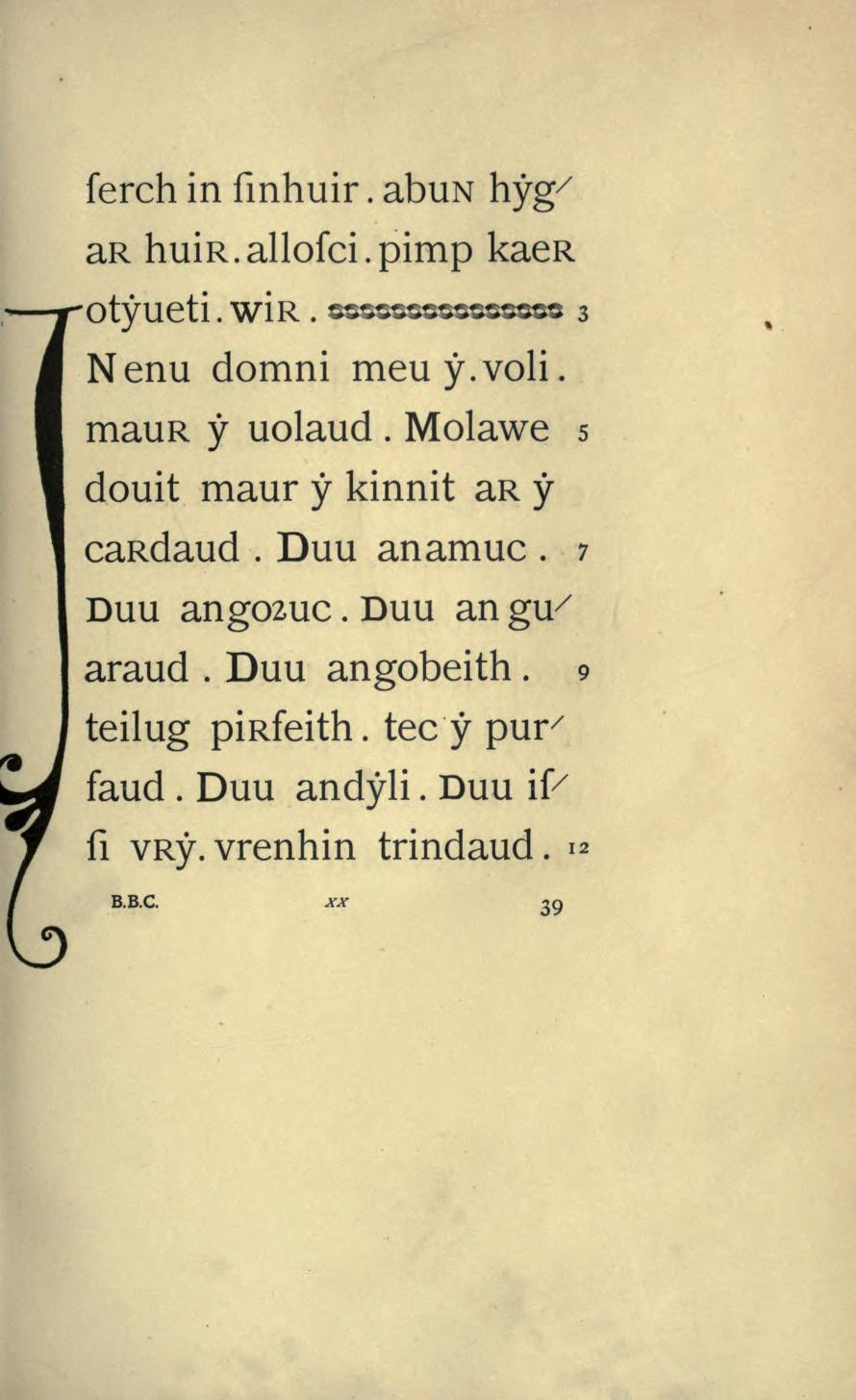
Page 39.

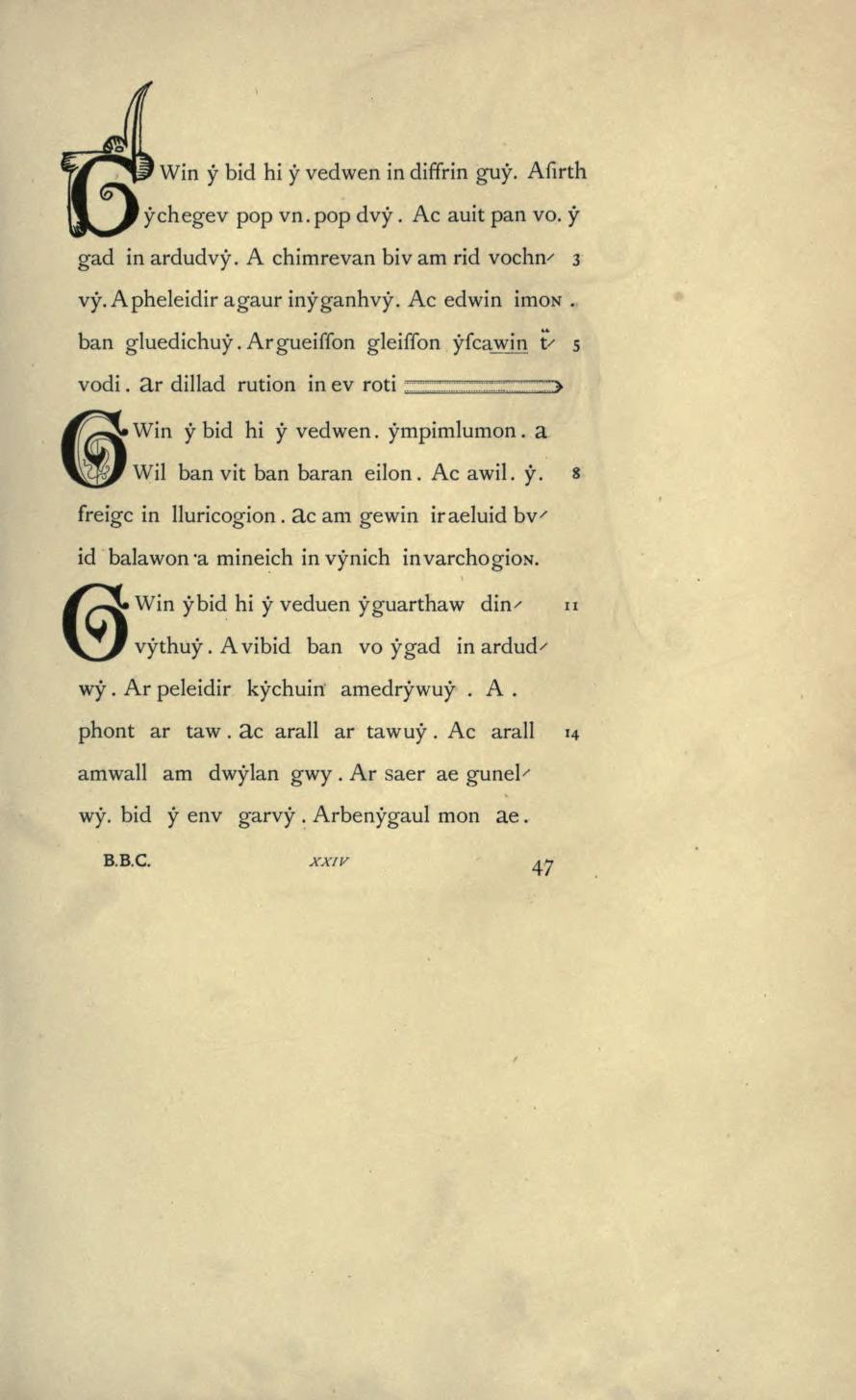
Page 47.

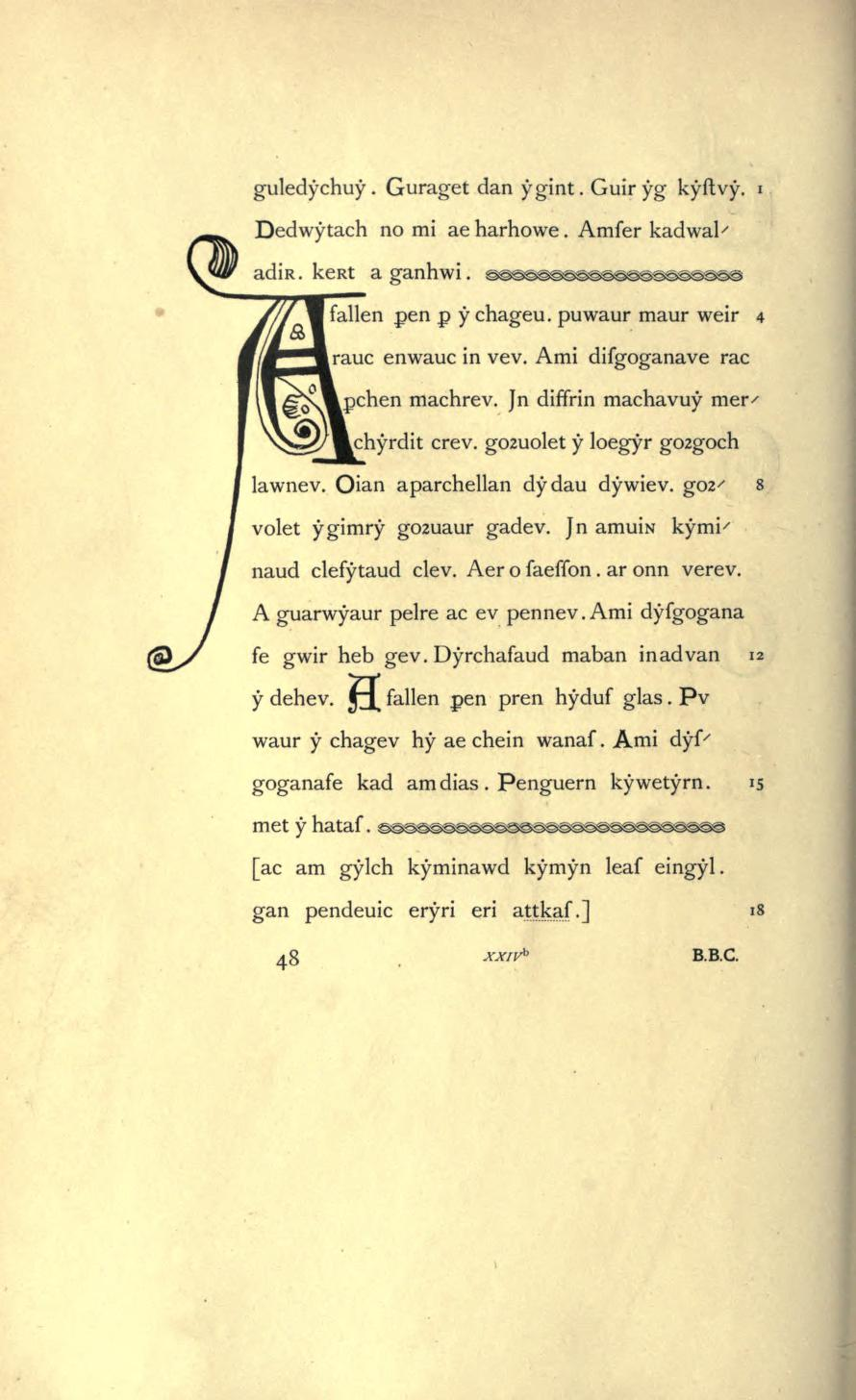
Page 48.

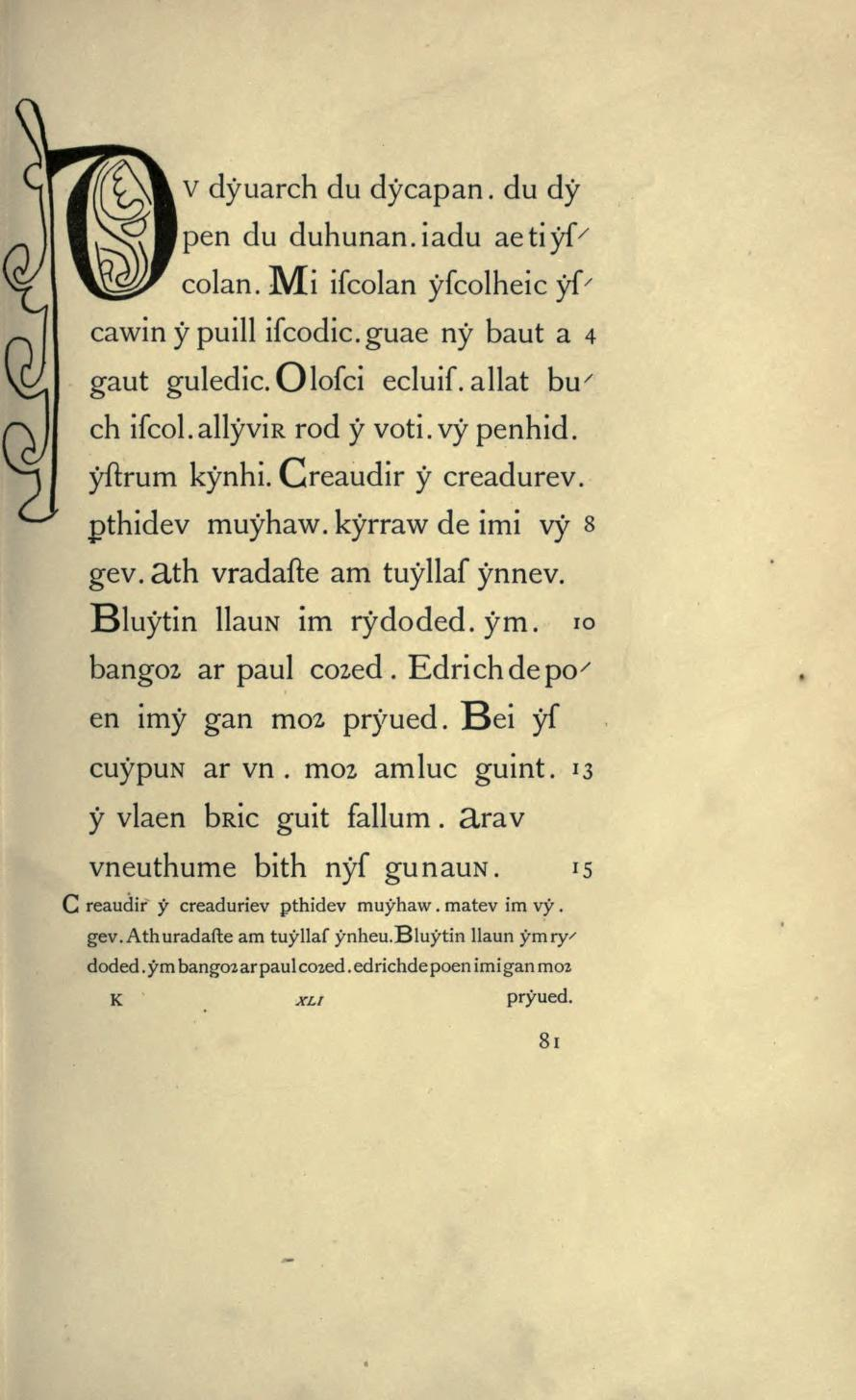
Page 81.

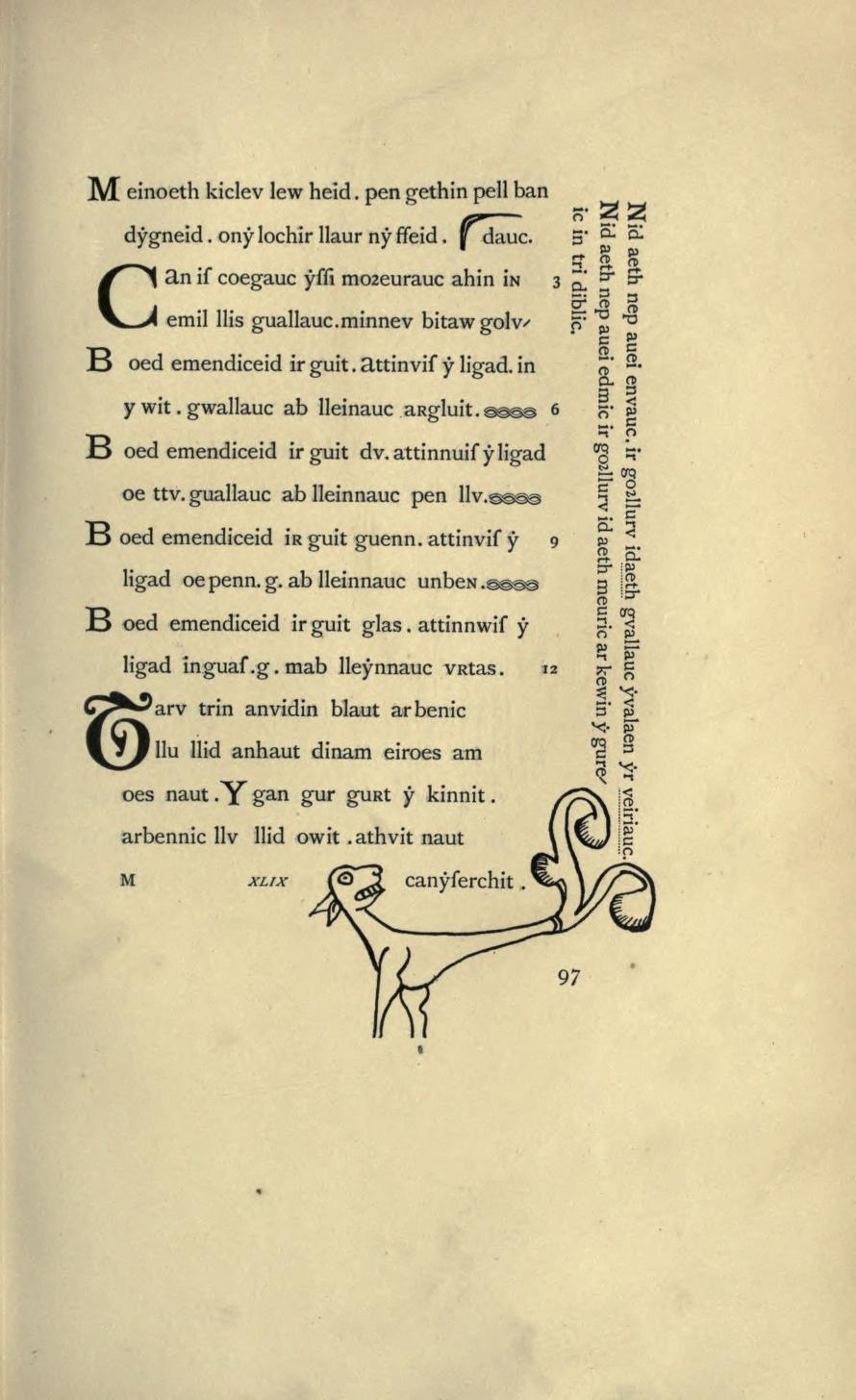
Page 97.

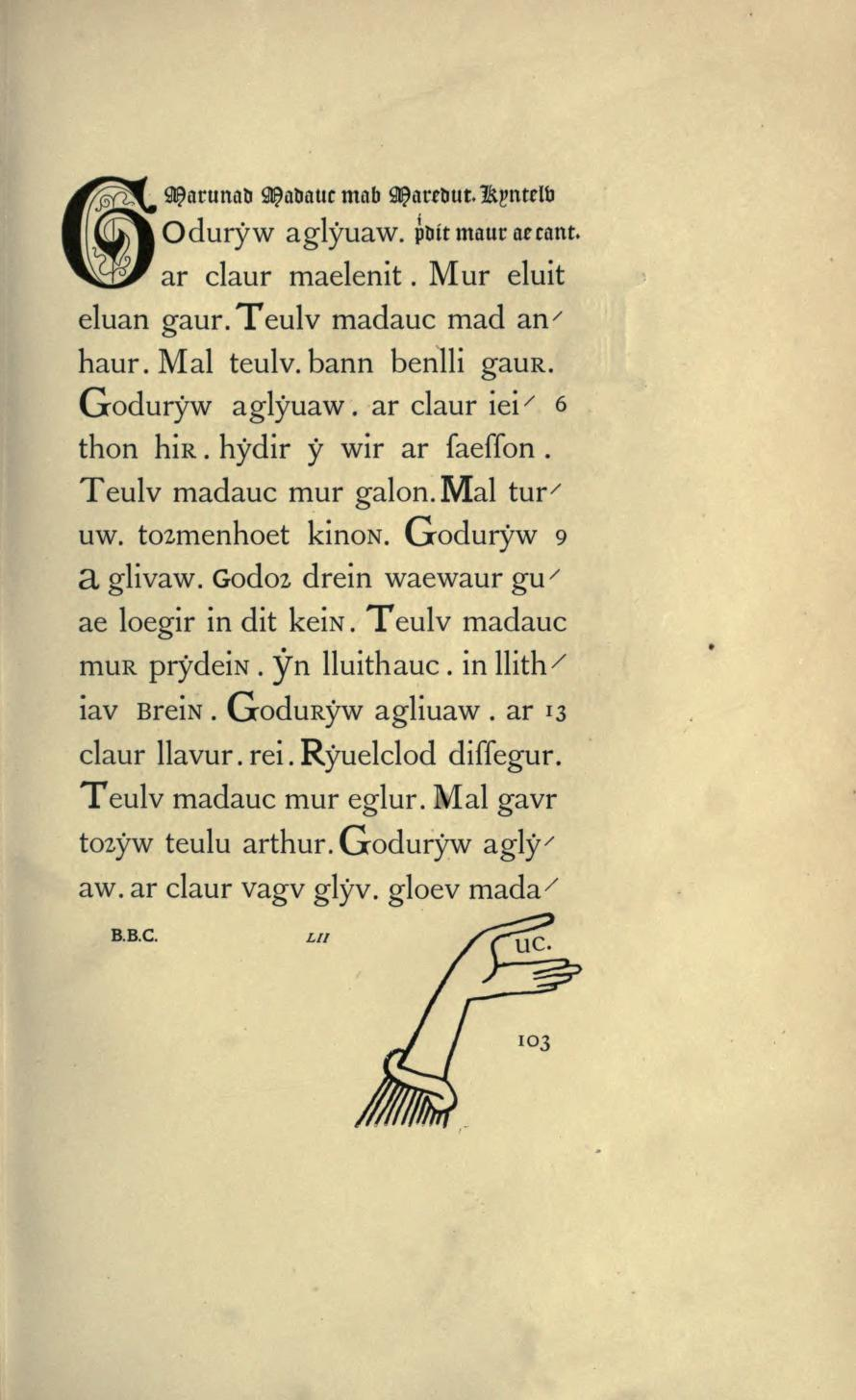
Page 103.

Starting in 1893, Evans was granted a £200 (£21,816 in 2025) civil-list pension to fund his manuscript research. The next year he was appointed inspector of Welsh manuscripts for the Historical Manuscripts Commission. From 1898 to 1910, Evans published seven volumes of "Report on Manuscripts in the Welsh Language" — considered one of his most important and influential works – which were presented to both houses of Parliament. The series is a "monumental work," covering over 900 manuscripts from the 12th to 19th centuries.

The University of Oxford granted Evans an honorary Doctor of Letters in 1901; the University of Wales awarded him the same degree in 1905.

=== National Library of Wales ===
A campaign to create a National Library of Wales first started in 1873. Notable book collector John Williams is considered its principal founder – his collection made up a critical portion of the library's early body.

Evans had been introduced to Williams in 1894, and over the next few years they became friends over their shared love of old books. They disagreed on what should be done with Williams's extensive book collection; Evans eventually convinced Williams to donate the books so they could be enjoyed by the public.

Sir John would often be disappointed with my lack of enthusiasm, and one evening he roundly reproached me for caring only for "dull, musty old manuscripts which no one could read," and I him for "amassing dirty old books which nobody would read."

— John Gwenogvryn Evans, Western Mail, August 4, 1928

He was elected the University of Wales's Court of Governors in the fall of 1897 and served as a "mouthpiece" for Williams during negotiations for a national library. Evans helped Williams secure the Peniarth Manuscripts — a collection containing some of the oldest and most important Welsh manuscripts in existence, including the Black Book of Carmarthen, Book of Taliesin and White Book of Rhydderch — in 1898, which became the focal point of the new National Library of Wales and one of the driving reasons for its creation. He introduced Williams to the manuscripts' owner, William Watkin Edward Wynne, and facilitated the collection's sale.

When the library formally began construction in 1911, Evans met King George V and his family — Queen Mary, Princess Mary, and the future King Edward VIII — who travelled to Aberystwyth on July 15 to lay the ceremonial foundation stone.

=== Work during retirement ===
In 1905, Evans retired to Llanbedrog in Caernarfonshire, where he and his wife Edith lived in Tremfan Hall. Then 53 years old, he did not stop publishing early Welsh texts and creating his own prints. Evans's work during his retirement was "nothing short of astonishing, marked by an extremely high level of accuracy produced by hand-typesetting with the utmost care."

During his retirement, Evans produced some of his most well-known translations, including "The Black Book of Carmarthen," "The White Book Mabinogion: Welsh Tales and Romances," "The Text of the Book of Aneirin," "Kymdeithas Amlyn ac Amic," and "Facsimile of the Chirk Codex of the Welsh Laws." Much of his work during the early 20th century focused on the meaning of texts and the poetry of their writing, which he felt other translations had a tendency to omit. The Black Book of Carmarthen particularly held significance to him, since he was born in Carmarthenshire and educated in Carmarthen.

It is a common assumption that there is nothing worthy of the name of Literature in the Black Book of Carmarthen,— nothing that is intelligible, or of interest to any one who is not a pedant, or a philologist. No assumption could be farther removed from the fact, unless by literature be meant the Drama ... But if by Literature be meant that witchery over words and ideas which charms the mind, kindles the emotion, ennobles the motive, and gives eyes to see and understand what was never realized before, then there is Literature, and good literature too, in the Black Book.

— John Gwenogvryn Evans, The Black Book of Carmarthen, page xxix

=== Taliesin and rivalry with John Morris-Jones ===
Starting in 1909, Evans's work began to shift toward text interpretation instead of just translation. His theories on the poetry of Aneirin and Taliesin — the later especially – were controversial and led to his years-long rivalry with fellow Welsh academic John Morris-Jones.

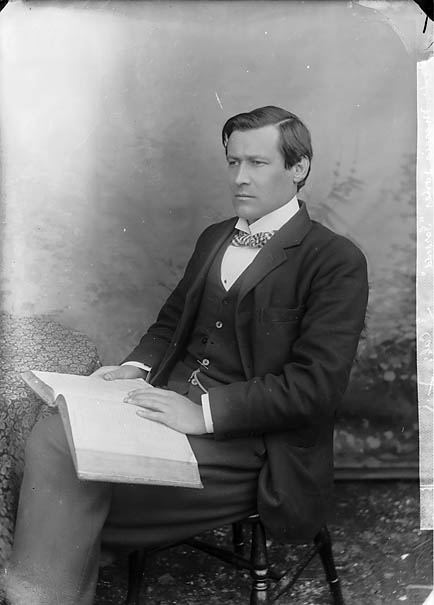
John Morris-Jones, photograph by John Thomas, c. 1885, when Morris-Jones was a student at Oxford.

Evans and Morris-Jones were at Oxford at the same time in the 1880s. They both attended Rhŷs's lectures and the two had an amicable professional relationship, often proofreading each other's work; Evans described Morris-Jones as a friend in a 1906 preface, offering him his "heartiest thanks" for his additions to the translation.

When Evans published the second of a two-volume set on Taliesin poetry in 1915, he included several of his personal theories and interpretations of the work. His most controversial claim was his belief that the Battle of Catraeth was fought in 1098 A.D. — not the 6th century as is generally accepted. Morris-Jones wrote a roughly 300-page response to Evans's Taliesin in the Y Cymmrodor periodical of the Cymmrodorion Society. Originally, it was meant to be a short review of the book, but Morris-Jones wrote so much that the editors ended up having to devote the entirety of that year's volume to his response.

Morris-Jones's writing was famously ruthless and severe; the harshness of his response to Evans's Taliesin turned what had been a relatively obscure literary debate into "the bitterest controversy in Welsh letters in the [twentieth] century." Despite having support from scholars for the factual content of his work, Morris-Jones received little support from the public, who found his response "too acrimonious in spirit" and generally sided with Evans.

I have read the Taliesin, with interest and some dislike ... through 151 pages the Taliesin problem seems less important than the slaying, with bludgeon and stiletto, of poor Dr. Gwenogvryn Evans.

— A.A G. Edwards, Archbishop of Wales

Evans wrote his own response in Y Cymmrodor; the editors also gave him an entire volume for his work, titled Taliesin: Or the Critic Criticised, in order to "have now the two sides of the subject laid before them by their respective protagonists." Most of Evans's theories on Taliesin have since been disproved; however, he saw this as academic advancement:

Controversy has the merit of creating interest in a subject, and to be interested is the first step to gaining knowledge of it.

— John Gwenogvryn Evans, Taliesin: Or the Critic Criticised

== Death and legacy ==
In the 1920s, Evans's work focused more on collections of texts, as well as relatively newer manuscripts compared to his previous translations. He published "Poetry by Medieval Welsh Bards" and "Welsh Classics for the People," among other works.

His wife Edith died in 1923 at the age of 77. She was buried at their home at Tremfan Hall in a rock grave Evans built by hand; when he died on March 25, 1930, he was buried there as well.

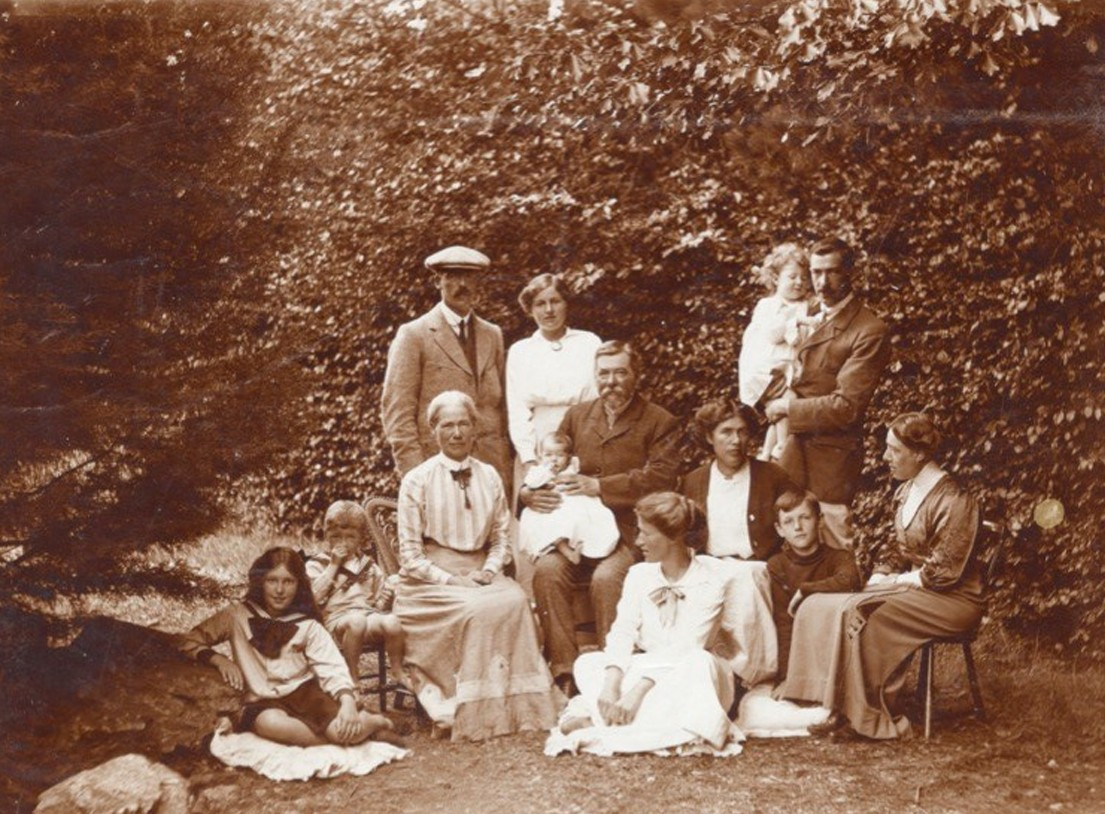
John Gwenogvryn Evans, Edith Hunter, and their family at Tremfan Hall. c.1920.

Many of Evans's translations are still used as the de facto sources today. His hand drawn reproductions of medieval Welsh lettering are credited with helping bring meticulous details of medieval manuscripts to a wider audience.

The Evans family home, Tremfan Hall, has since been converted to a restaurant as well as a bed and breakfast. The surrounding land became Tremfan Park and is located within the Llŷn Area of Outstanding Natural Beauty.

All of Evans's papers, manuscripts, and publications were donated to the National Library of Wales.
