= Hengwrt =

Mansion near Dolgellau in Meirionnydd, Wales

Coordinates: 52.752039°N 003.899727°W

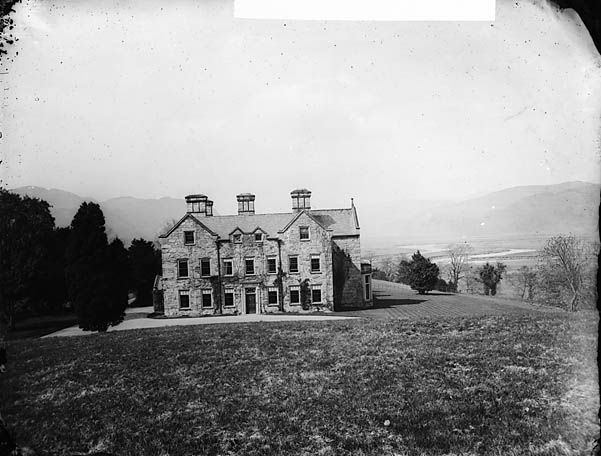
Plas Hengwrt in 1875

Hengwrt (Welsh for 'old court') was a mansion near Dolgellau in Meirionnydd, Gwynedd. It lay in the parish of Llanelltyd near the confluence of the River Mawddach and River Wnion, near Cymer Abbey. With medieval origins, it was rebuilt or remodelled on several occasions before being demolished in 1962. It is remembered as the original home of the important collection of the Peniarth Manuscripts, now in the National Library of Wales.

== History ==
Hengwrt was recorded as a grange of Cymer Abbey, and after the Dissolution of the Monasteries passed with the rest of the abbey properties to Sergeant at Arms John Powys. It was eventually bought by Hywel Vaughan of Gwengraig, after which it remained in the Vaughan family for many years.

A new house was built in 1750–54 on the site of the earlier building; it was substantially remodelled in 1830, when it was refaced in stone.

Hengwrt was purchased by William McConnel in 1859. McConnell was the owner the Sedgwick cotton mill in Manchester, one of the largest mills in operation in the United Kingdom. In January 1864, he formed the Aberdovey Slate Company which leased the Bryn Eglwys slate quarry near Abergynolwyn. He built and opened the Talyllyn Railway to transport slate from his quarry to the main line at Tywyn; he owned the railway and quarry until 1910.

Hengwrt mansion was demolished in 1962 following a fire, though some of its outbuildings survive.

== Literary connections ==
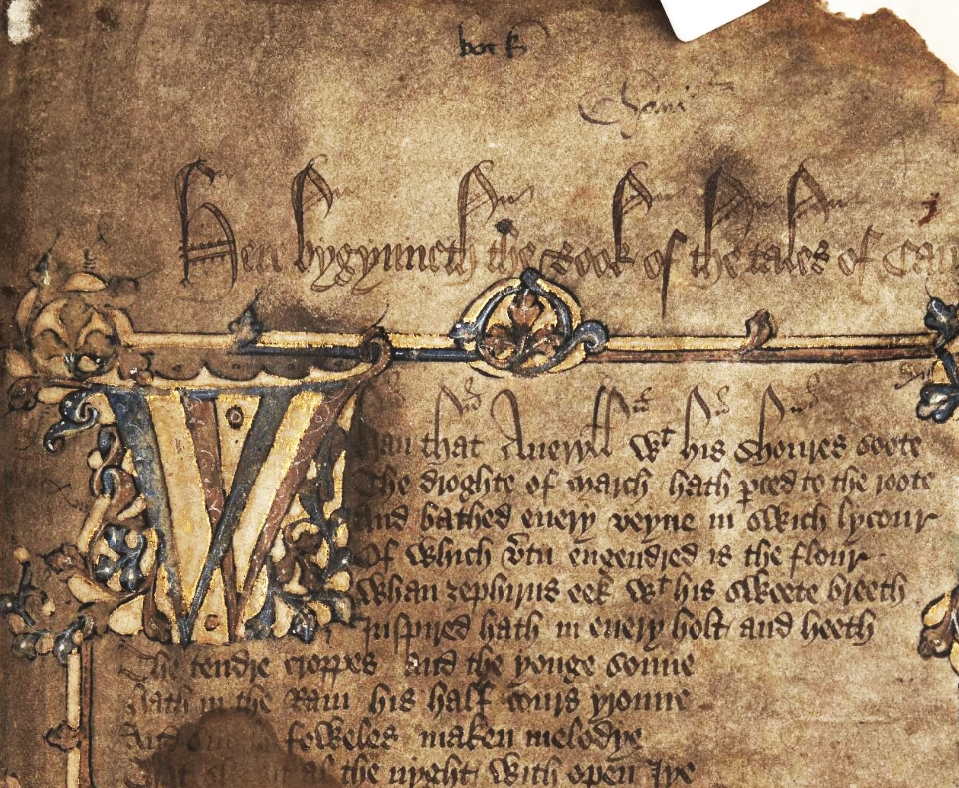
The first page of the Hengwrt Chaucer manuscript, National Library of Wales

Hengwrt is famous in Welsh literary history as the former home of one of the most important collections of Welsh manuscripts, the Hengwrt–Peniarth Manuscripts (often known more simply as the Peniarth Manuscripts), now held in the National Library of Wales in Aberystwyth. The collection was originally assembled by the collector and antiquarian Robert Vaughan, who lived at Hengwrt during the 17th century. They included treasures such as the White Book of Rhydderch, Black Book of Carmarthen, Book of Taliesin and the Book of Aneirin, along with the Brut y Tywysogion. The collection includes an important early copy of Chaucer also known as the "Hengwrt Chaucer" or, misleadingly, the "Hengwrt Manuscript".

These manuscripts remained in the Hengwrt library for 300 years, although several others in the collection (including the Hendregadredd Manuscript and the lost Hengwrt 33 or Hanesyn Hên) disappeared in the late 18th century. Edward Lhuyd is recorded as having seen the antiquarian books there in 1696. A number of 18th- and early 19th-century antiquarians visited the mansion to see and copy manuscripts, including Evan Evans, William Owen Pughe and Iolo Morganwg. The collection was inherited by William Watkin Edward Wynne of Peniarth Mansion in 1859, to where it was removed. In 1904 Sir John Williams purchased the collection from the Wynne family, subsequently donating it to the new National Library when it was established in 1907.

The room in the National Library in which some of the manuscripts are displayed is named "Hengwrt", after the mansion.

In the 18th century Hengwrt was the home of the diarist Elizabeth Baker, who was employed as a secretary to Hugh Vaughan, Robert Vaughan's great-great grandson.

In the late 19th century it was the home of sculptor Mary Lloyd and her partner, the journalist and social reformer Frances Power Cobbe.
