= Peniarth 259B =

16th-century Welsh legal manuscript

Peniarth Manuscript 259B, known as Pomffred since it had previously been owned by the constable of Pontefract Castle, is a version of the Laws of Hywel Dda. Aneurin Owen assigned this manuscript the siglum Z in his Ancient laws and institutes of Wales. It is one of the Peniarth Manuscripts in the National Library of Wales. It was transcribed in the mid-sixteenth century by two hands: Richard Longford and his amanuensis, from an earlier exemplar owned by Einion ab Addain, who was serving a prison sentence in Pontefract at the time that it was copied.

== Description ==
This manuscript is unusual in that it is the sole law manuscript that was copied onto paper rather than parchment. The ninety-eight leaves measure 280 × 200mm, written in twenty-nine lines and two columns.
