= Peniarth 6 =

13th-century Welsh manuscript

Peniarth 6 is a medieval Welsh manuscript. It is part of the collection of Peniarth Manuscripts, named for Peniarth Mansion in Meirionnydd, south Gwynedd, where they were kept for many years.

Among the texts are parts of the Four Branches of the Mabinogi, the oldest prose stories existing in British literature, and a version of Gereint and Enid. It dates to the period circa 1225-1275. Peniarth 6 is kept in the National Library of Wales, Aberystwyth.
