= Thomas Wilkins (antiquarian) =

Welsh clergyman and antiquarian

Thomas Wilkins (1625 or 1626 – 20 August 1699) was a Welsh cleric and antiquarian, who collected Welsh manuscripts.

== Life ==
His father and his grandfather were both called Thomas Wilkins; all three in turn were rectors of St Mary's Church in Glamorgan. Wilkins (the grandson) was educated at Jesus College, Oxford, matriculating in 1641 and obtaining a law degree in 1661. He was rector of Gelligaer and Llan-maes, and a prebendary of Llandaff. In addition to his clerical duties, Wilkins was also an antiquarian and collected manuscripts, including the Red Book of Hergest and the Book of the Anchorite. After his death, on 20 August 1699, his eldest son (also called Thomas) donated these two manuscripts to Jesus College.
