= Peniarth Manuscripts =

Collection of Welsh books in the form of a manuscript

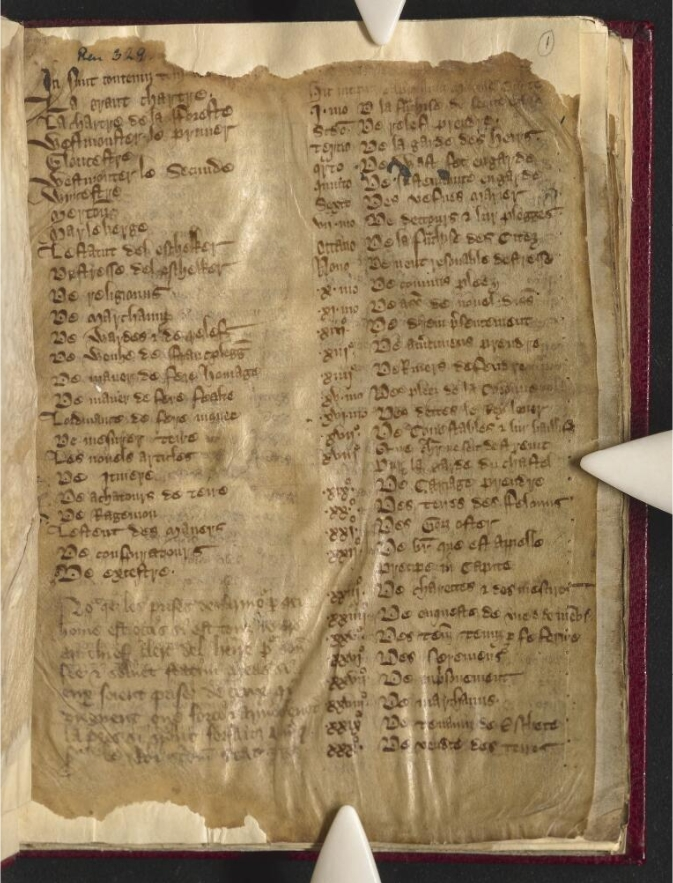
Page from Peniarth MS 329, "Ancient laws" (14th century)

The Peniarth Manuscripts, also known as the Hengwrt–Peniarth Manuscripts, are a collection of medieval Welsh manuscripts now held by the National Library of Wales in Aberystwyth. The collection was originally assembled by Robert Vaughan (c. 1592–1667) of Hengwrt, in the historic county of Merionethshire in North West Wales. During the 19th century it was held in Peniarth Mansion in Llanegryn.

In 1859 William Watkin Edward Wynne inherited the collection. In 1898 it was sold to Sir John Williams, who had himself acquired a large private library. Subsequently a plan to establish a National Library of Wales emerged. When it did so, Williams promised that he would donate the collection to the library on condition that it would be based in Aberystwyth. This condition was met, and Sir John duly donated the collection to the National Library.

The collection contains some of the oldest and most important Welsh manuscripts in existence. For example it includes the Black Book of Carmarthen, Book of Taliesin and White Book of Rhydderch (containing the Four Branches of the Mabinogi, the Three Welsh Romances and other tales) and a number of other ancient manuscripts, including early texts of the Cyfraith Hywel and by Beirdd yr Uchelwyr (the Poets of the Nobility). The manuscripts in other languages include two Latin manuscripts of Geoffrey of Monmouth's Historia Regum Britanniae and an early illuminated version of the Canterbury Tales known as the Hengwrt Chaucer.

== Selected list of manuscripts ==
- Black Book of Carmarthen
- Black Book of Chirk
- White Book of Rhydderch
- Book of Taliesin
- Beunans Meriasek
- Hengwrt Chaucer
- Peniarth 6. Contents include the earliest surviving texts (c.1225–75) of parts of the Four Branches of the Mabinogi.
- Peniarth 20
- History of the Kings (Peniarth 23C)
- Peniarth 28
- Peniarth 32
- Peniarth 49
- Peniarth 51
- Peniarth 53
- Peniarth 109
- Peniarth 164
- Peniarth 259B
- Peniarth 481
- Vaux Passional (Peniarth 482D)

== See also ==
- List of Welsh Law manuscripts

== Bibliography ==
- J. Gwenogvryn Evans, Reports on Manuscripts in the Welsh Language, volume I, number 2 and 3.
- Handlist of Manuscripts in the National Library of Wales, volume I, number 1.
