= Hengwrt Chaucer =

15th century manuscript

The Hengwrt Chaucer manuscript is an early-15th-century manuscript of the Canterbury Tales, held in the National Library of Wales, in Aberystwyth. It is an important source for Chaucer's text, and was possibly written by someone with access to an original authorial holograph, now lost.

The Hengwrt Chaucer is part of a collection called the Peniarth Manuscripts which is included by UNESCO in its UK Memory of the World Register, a list of documentary heritage which holds cultural significance specific to the UK. It is catalogued as National Library of Wales MS Peniarth 392D. Following the terminology developed by John M. Manly and Edith Rickert, the manuscript is conventionally referred to as Hg in most editions giving variant readings.

== History of the manuscript ==
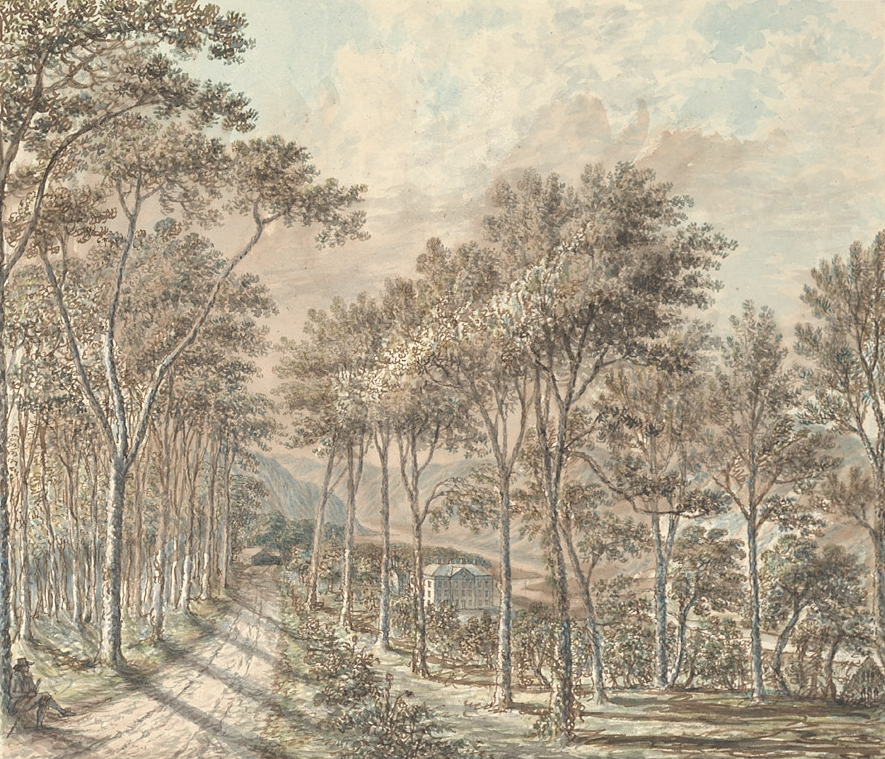
Hengwrt, the seat of the Vaughan family, 1793

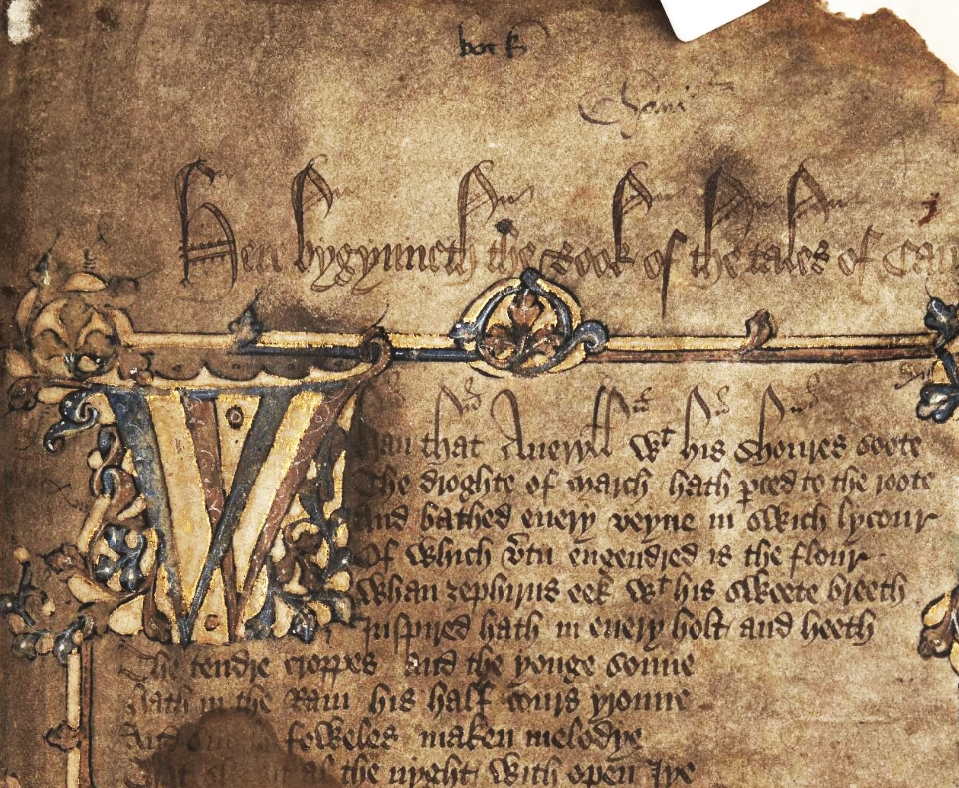
The opening folio of the Hengwrt Chaucer manuscript contains the beginning of the General Prologue.

The Hengwrt Chaucer has been in Wales for at least 400 years. This was one of the collection of manuscripts amassed at the mansion of Hengwrt, near Dolgellau, Gwynedd, by Welsh antiquary Robert Vaughan (c.1592–1667); the collection later passed to the newly established National Library of Wales in 1909.

The Hengwrt manuscript's very early ownership is unknown, but recent research suggests that Chaucer himself may have partly supervised the making of the manuscript, before his death in October 1400, according to the Welsh newspaper The Western Mail. By the 16th century it can be identified as belonging to Fouke Dutton, a draper of Chester who died in 1558. It then seems to have passed into the ownership of the Bannester family of Chester and Caernarfon, and through them was in the possession of an Andrew Brereton by 1625; by the middle of the 17th century it had been acquired by Vaughan.

== Description ==
Peniarth MS 392 D contains 250 folios with a page size of around 29 x 20.5 centimetres (11½" x 8"). It is written on heavily stained and rather damaged parchment. Vermin have eaten around nine centimeters (3½") from the outer corners of the leaves. It is less complete than the Ellesmere manuscript, and the tales are in an order that is unique to itself. The main textual hand has been identified with one found in several other manuscripts of the period (see below); there are a number of other hands in the manuscript, including one of a person who attempted to fill in several gaps in the text. This has been tentatively identified as the hand of the poet Thomas Hoccleve.

There is some illumination in blue, gold and pink, used on the border and on initial letters at the opening of individual tales and prologues, but the manuscript contains no illustrations.

== Scribe and relationship to other manuscripts ==
The Hengwrt manuscript was written by the same scribe as the lavishly illustrated Ellesmere manuscript, which, following the examples of the editors Frederick Furnivall and W. W. Skeat, was thought to be superior to Hengwrt and used as the base text for many modern editions of the Canterbury Tales. Since the work of John M. Manly and Edith Rickert in compiling their Text of the Canterbury Tales (1940), however, the Hengwrt manuscript has had a much higher degree of prominence in attempts to reconstruct Chaucer's text, displacing the previously prominent Ellesmere and Harley MS. 7334. Recent scholarship has shown that the variant spellings given in the Hengwrt manuscript likely reflect Chaucer's own spelling practices in his East Midlands / London dialect of Middle English, while the Ellesmere text shows evidence of a later attempt to regularise spelling; Hengwrt is therefore probably very close to the original authorial holograph.

The scribe of the Hengwrt and Ellesmere manuscripts has been identified by Linne Mooney, a palaeographer at the University of York, as Adam Pinkhurst, a documented member of the Worshipful Company of Scriveners. The attribution has been widely accepted, and other manuscripts have since been added to Pinkhurst's scribal canon. However, other scholars, including Jane Roberts, who drew Mooney's attention to Pinkhurst in the first place, have expressed skepticism about the identification on various palaeographical, literary, and historical grounds.

== Order ==
The tales are presented in the following order:

1. General Prologue
2. The Knight's Tale
3. The Miller's Tale
4. The Reeve's Tale
5. The Cook's Tale
6. The Wife of Bath’s Tale
7. The Friar's Tale
8. The Summoner's Tale
9. The Monk's Tale
10. The Nun's Priest's Tale
11. The Manciple's Tale
12. The Man of Law's Tale
13. The Squire's Tale
14. The Merchant's Tale
15. The Franklin's Tale
16. The Second Nun's Prologue and Tale
17. The Clerk's Tale
18. The Physician's Tale
19. The Pardoner's Tale
20. The Shipman's Tale
21. The Prioress' Tale
22. Sir Thopas
23. The Tale of Melibee
24. The Parson's Tale

== See also ==
- William Maurice (antiquary)
- Robert Vaughan (antiquary)
