= White Book of Hergest =

Lost medieval Welsh manuscript

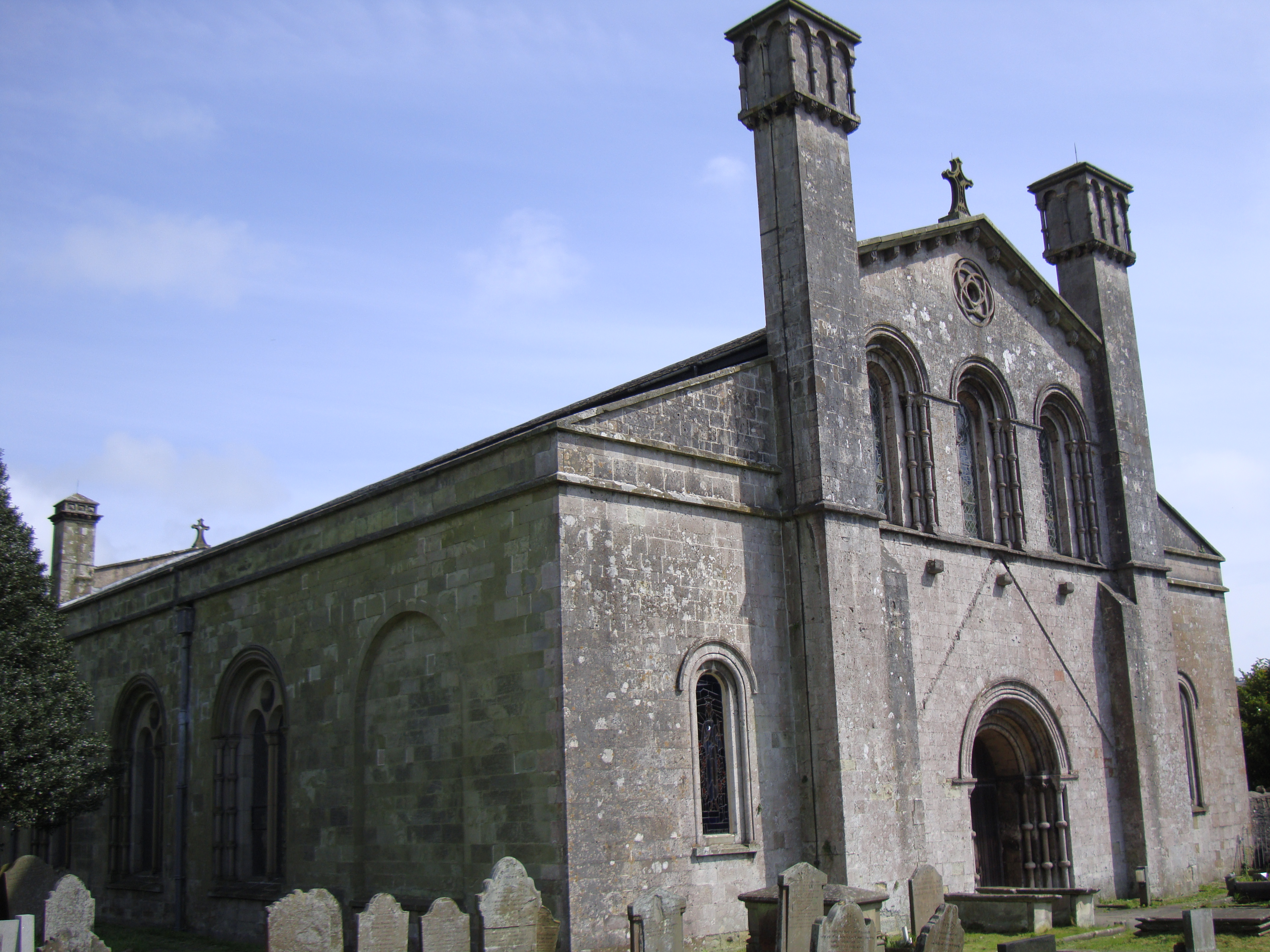

The White Book of Hergest (Welsh: Llyfr Gwyn Hergest, sometimes given as Llyfr Gwyn o Hergest) was an important Welsh manuscript compiled in c. 1450. It contained many Welsh poems and prose texts and was a significant source for several antiquaries of the 17th and 18th centuries, but disappeared in the early 19th century, probably being destroyed in a fire in a London bookbinder's shop in around 1810.

== History ==
The manuscript was one of several associated with the Vaughan family of Hergest Court near Kington, Herefordshire, but was originally, at least in part, the work of the poet and scribe Lewys Glyn Cothi, who is thought to have compiled it at Margam Abbey using texts found there. Glyn Cothi was a close associate of the Vaughans of Hergest and wrote elegies on the deaths of both Thomas ap Vaughan (d. 1469) and his son Richard. As befitted a manuscript produced for wealthy patrons, the White Book was a substantial document written on costly vellum, taking its name from the colour of its binding.

The scholar John Davies of Mallwyd transcribed a number of poems from the White Book into a manuscript now known as Peniarth 49. The 17th-century antiquary Robert Vaughan, who referred to the White Book as "a very fair and ancient" manuscript, also copied parts of it and used it as a genealogical source; Vaughan was also responsible for identifying Glyn Cothi's hand in the White Book. Other later researchers made copies of various individual sections, such as Moses Williams, who transcribed parts into Llanstephan MS. 74.

The manuscript came into the possession of the collector and antiquary William Maurice (d.1680), and was subsequently sold along with the rest of Maurice's library to Sir William Williams. The library was ultimately moved to the mansion of Wynnstay, where most of it was to be destroyed in an 1858 fire. The White Book of Hergest, however, seems to have already been lost in an earlier fire after it was sent (along with several other manuscripts) to Mackinley's bookbinder in Covent Garden for rebinding. Various dates for this event (such as 1810, 1808 or 1800) are found in different sources, though Y Cymmrodor, the journal of the Honourable Society of Cymmrodorion, vol 1 (1822), records it as recent. Angharad Llwyd stated that it occurred as a result of the disastrous fire at the Covent Garden Theatre, which took place in 1808; a record notes that the premises of John Mackinley at 8 Bow Street burned down along with the theatre.

== Contents ==
In addition to several poems by Lewys Glyn Cothi and a number by other poets, the manuscript was known to contain a large number of works by Dafydd ap Gwilym, although all of these seem either to have been copied by John Davies or survive in variants in other manuscripts. It also contained many prose and historical texts, including a copy of the Laws of Hywel Dda which contained several passages found in no other version. Lewys Glyn Cothi's interest in heraldry was reflected by the inclusion of pedigrees and other genealogical and heraldic materials such as the Llyfr Arfau, the "Book of Arms", ascribed to a John Trevor or Johannes de Bado Aureo, who may be one of several historical figures. Not all of the White Book's contents had been copied at the time of its destruction and some were irretrievably lost.

Parts of the White Book may be found in the following manuscripts:

- Peniarth MS. 49, which contains John Davies' transcript of many of the Dafydd ap Gwilym texts and variant readings taken from others
- Peniarth MS. 134, including Robert Vaughan's copies from the White Book of heraldic materials relating to the gentry of Glamorgan
- Peniarth MS. 225, includes copies of legal materials from the White Book
- Llanstephan MS. 74, which lists the White Book's contents
- British Library Add. MS. 31055
- Wynnstay MS. 2
- The composite manuscript Peniarth MS. 229, assembled by Robert Vaughan, includes a list of some of the White Book's contents

== See also ==
- Red Book of Hergest
