= William Maurice (antiquary) =

Welsh collector and transcriber

- Born: 1620; Cefn-y-braich, Llansilin, Denbighshire, Wales
- Died: 1680 (aged 59–60); Cefn-y-braich, Llansilin, Denbighshire, Wales
- Occupation: Antiquary
- Parent: Lewis Maurice (father)

William Maurice (1620–1680) was a well-known seventeenth-century collector and transcriber of Welsh manuscripts and books from Denbighshire, Wales.

== Early life ==
Maurice was born around 1620 in the small community of Cefn-y-Braich in the parish of Llansilin in the historic county of Denbighshire in Wales. He owned land and lived most of his life in the area.

== Mid life ==
Maurice collected Welsh literature. He had so many books and manuscripts that he built a three-storey library near his home in Cefn-y-Braich called "the Study" in which to store them. He spent much of his time there. His collection of books was a fac simile of Friar Baeon's Study, because his library was similar to Roger Bacon's books and manuscripts. Maurice was associated with the antiquary Robert Vaughan in the collecting and maintaining of these ancient Welsh manuscripts and books that ultimately became a collection of the Hengwrt-Peniarth library, an important part of the National Library of Wales. Maurice cataloged the Hengwrt manuscript collection in 1658. Many manuscripts are in Maurice's own hand. (Note: "In some of his manuscripts he used a Welsh orthography peculiar to himself, and no manuscript was too precious for him to disfigure with his scrawl.")

== Genealogy ==
Maurice's father was Lewis Maurice, from the family line of Moeliwrch of Powys, Wales. He is descended maternally from the sister of Owain Glyndŵr. Maurice married Laetitia, a descendant of Glyndwr's opponent Henry Bolinbroke. Maurice had a daughter named Laetitia (also known as Anne), who inherited his estate and married David Williams of Glan Kynlleth. Maurice's third great-grandchild was John Stanley, 1st Baron Stanley of Alderley. His ninth great-grandchild is James Robert Bruce Ogilvy, founder of Luxury Briefing (a magazine about luxury items).

== Death ==
Maurice died around 1680.

== Works ==
Maurice wrote an historical account of the North Wales civil war, which was later reprinted in the journal Archaeologia Cambrensis. He edited and republished Humphrey Llwyd's historical manuscript Cronica Walliae that was previously published by David Powel's 1584 History of Cambria.

== See also ==
- Hengwrt Chaucer
