= Lewys Glyn Cothi =

15th century Welsh poet

Lewys Glyn Cothi (c. 1420 – 1490), also known as Llywelyn y Glyn, was a prominent 15th-century Welsh poet who composed numerous poems in the Welsh language. He is one of the most important representatives of the Beirdd yr Uchelwyr ("Poets of the Nobility") or Cywyddwyr ("cywydd-men"), the itinerant professional poets of the period between the 1284 Statute of Rhuddlan and c. 1600.

== Life ==
He was born about 1420, possibly at Pwllcynbyd farm, near the remote hamlet of Rhydycymerau in the parish of Llanybydder in south-west Wales: he took his bardic name from the nearby forest of Glyn Cothi in the Cothi valley. His given name was Llewelyn, but he generally used the common Welsh hypocorism "Lewys" in his verse, and is more usually known by this name. One of his manuscripts suggests that he may have received some education at Carmarthen Priory, but his early life is otherwise rather obscure.

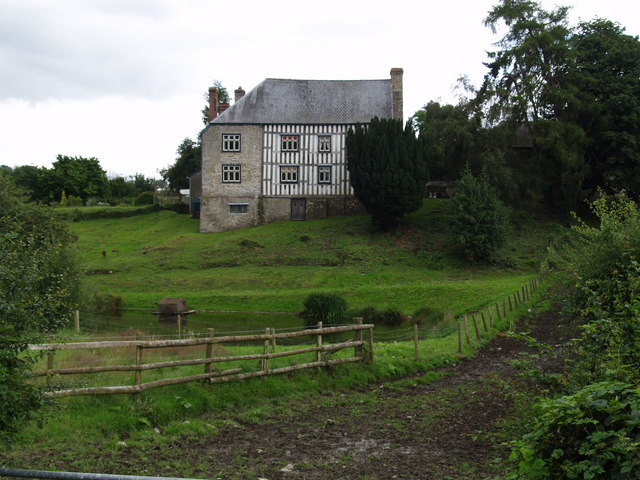
Hergest Court, Herefordshire, once a large mansion belonging to the Vaughan family, patrons of Lewys Glyn Cothi. The White Book of Hergest, compiled by Lewys, and the Red Book of Hergest were once kept here.

Lewys lived through the Wars of the Roses, in which he was an adherent of the Lancastrian party, supporting the interests of Jasper Tudor, the Earl of Pembroke, and later of Henry Tudor. He is thought to have witnessed the Lancastrian defeat at the Battle of Mortimer's Cross in the company of Owen ap Gruffudd ap Nicolas, the son of a prominent Carmarthenshire esquire, and subsequently both men spent time as outlaws in Snowdonia. Although many of his poems are addressed to pro-Lancastrian gentry, he was not above praising Yorkist patrons when occasion demanded it, such as the Vaughan family of Hergest, Herefordshire, with whom his name is often associated.

There is a story, originating in a note on a manuscript copy of his poetry, that Lewys settled at Chester and was later ejected from the city by its burgesses for marrying a widow without their consent. Other stories attached to different manuscripts claim that he was instead driven out of the staunchly Yorkist city for making a verse prophecy that Henry Tudor would become king. Although unconfirmed, it seems certain that something occurred to make him a laughing-stock of Chester's citizens and to spur him to satirise them mercilessly in an awdl, describing them as the offspring of "eight kinds of intercourse in the bushes" ("cyw wythryw cyfathrach — dan lwyn") and calling the vengeance of another Lancastrian retainer, Rheinallt ap Gruffydd ap Bleddyn of Mold, on their heads.

Lewys travelled widely in Wales, visiting the houses of various patrons, and seems to have had a particular affection for Anglesey, where he paid tribute to the hospitality he received, writing "Gorddu yw brig Iwerddon / gan fwg ceginau o Fôn" ("Blackened are the trees of Ireland / by the smoke of the kitchens of Anglesey").

He is known to have had at least one son, John, whose death at the age of 5 led Lewys to write one of his most powerful poems, the elegy Marwnad Siôn y Glyn, part of which runs, in a translation by the academic and poet Gwyn Williams, as:

Yngo y saif angau Siôn
yn ddeufrath yn y ddwyfron.
Fy mab, fy muarth baban,
fy mron, fy nghalon, fy nghân,
fy mryd cyn fy marw ydoedd,
fy mardd doeth, fy moeth im oedd

Translation:

Siôn's death stands near me
like two barbs in my breast.
My son, child of my hearth,
my breast, my heart, my song,
my one delight before my death,
my knowing poet, my luxury.

A tradition states that Lewys, who appears to have died around 1490, was buried at Abergwili, but his place of burial and exact date of death remain unconfirmed. One of his last poems is addressed to Henry Tudor after the latter had been crowned as King Henry VII.

== Work ==
Lewys was a prolific poet, writing many celebratory poems and elegies: about 230 of his poems have survived in various manuscript sources. Although his strict-metre style is not as polished as some, it has been characterised as "fluent and natural". His work ranges from elaborate poems of praise and devotional verse to broad humour, the latter particularly when begging patrons for various items. He was an accomplished scribe, and is thought to have been responsible for compiling much, if not all, of Llyfr Gwyn Hergest (the White Book of Hergest), an important late-medieval Welsh manuscript which disappeared in the early 19th century (he also added several poems to the Red Book of Hergest, which is now in the National Library of Wales). Lewys was also an expert on heraldry, and compiled several treatises on the subject. The manuscript Peniarth 109, which contains over a hundred of his poems in his own hand, was illustrated by him with the arms of many Welsh noble families.

His entire works were published in 1953 through the cooperation of the National Library of Wales and the University of Wales Press Board, and were edited by E. D. Jones.

== See also ==
- Lewis Glyn Cothi at Wikisource
