= Peniarth 28 =

Medieval Latin manuscript on Welsh law

Peniarth 28 is the earliest of the surviving copy of the Laws of Hywel Dda. The manuscript, which is written in Latin, dates from the second half of the thirteenth century. It is part of the Peniarth Manuscript Collection that was the foundation collection of the National Library of Wales.

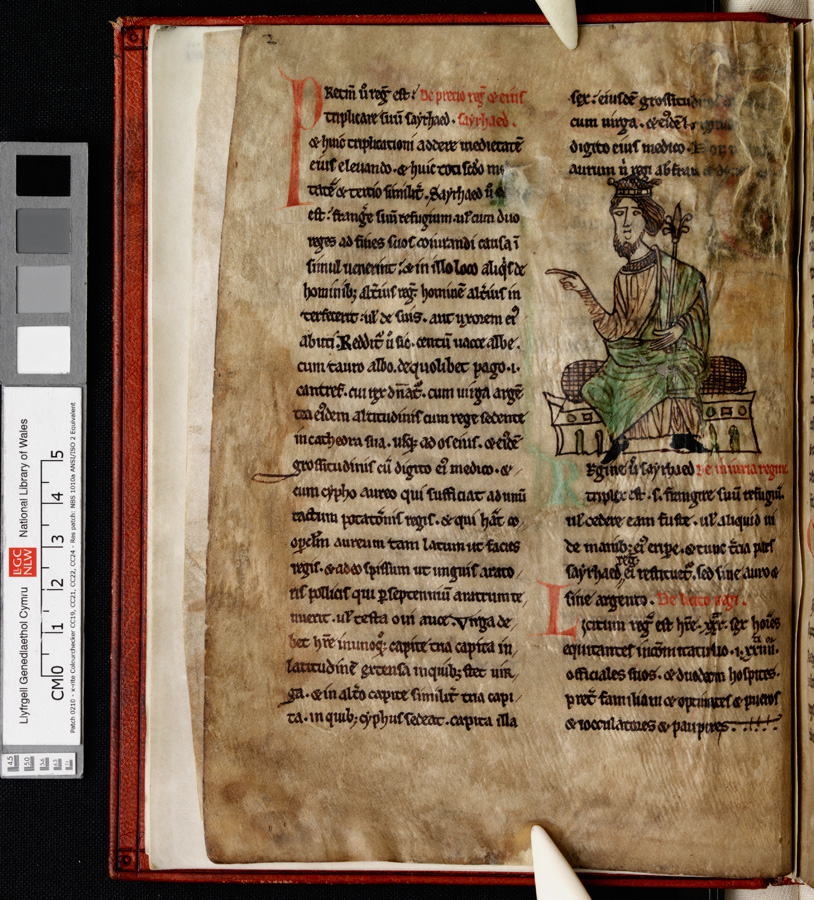
Folio 1 verso: King Hywel

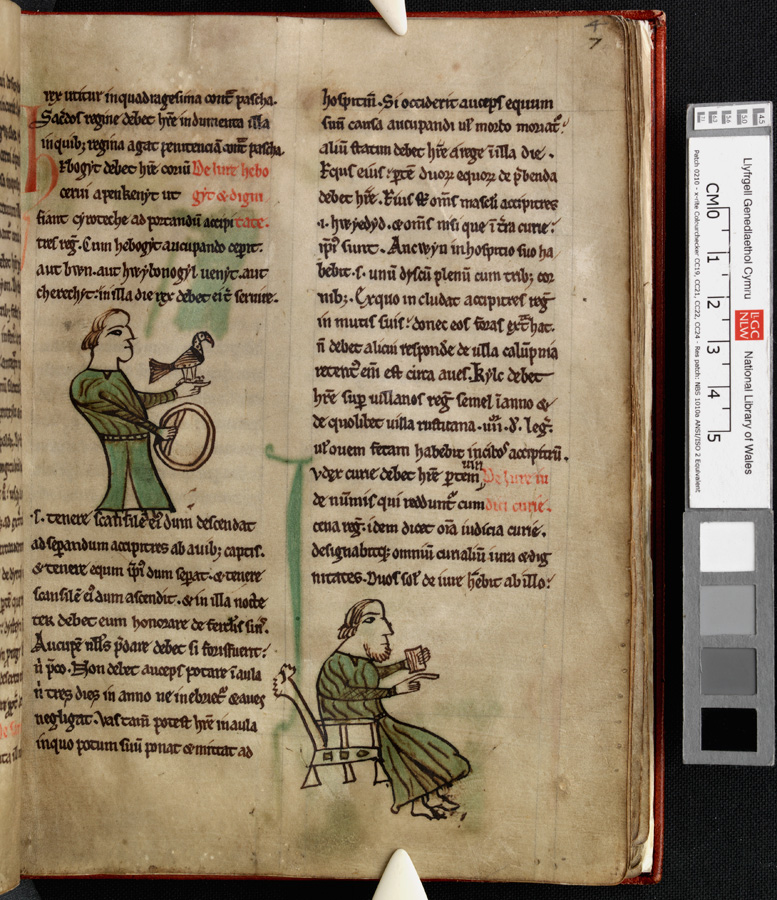
Folio 4 recto: Judge & Hawker

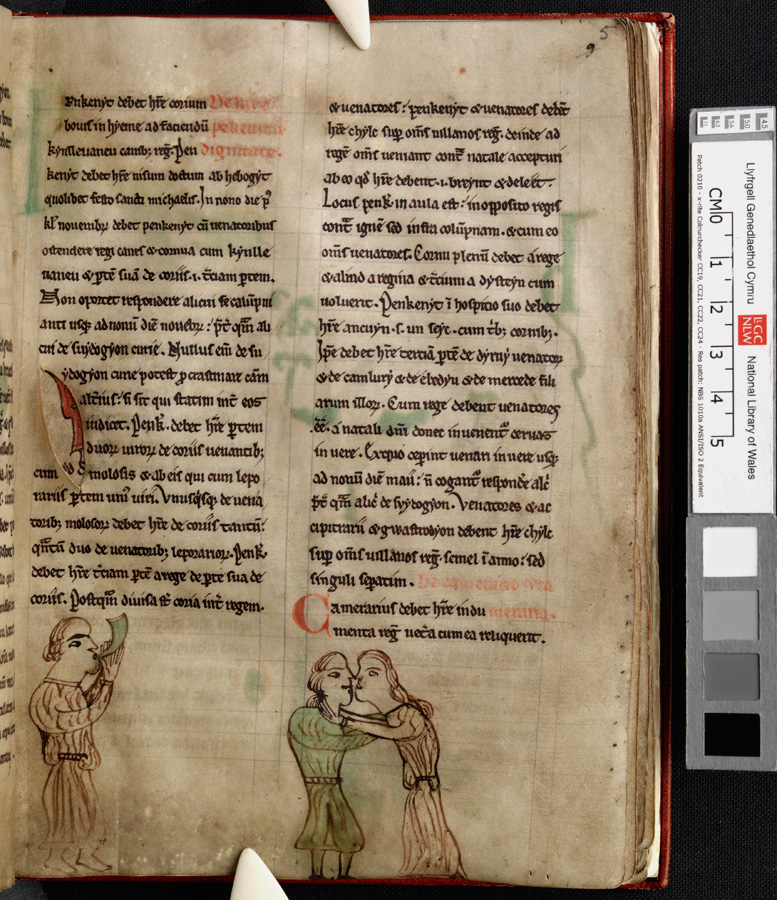
Folio 5 recto: Kissing couple
