= White Book of Rhydderch =

14th century Welsh manuscript

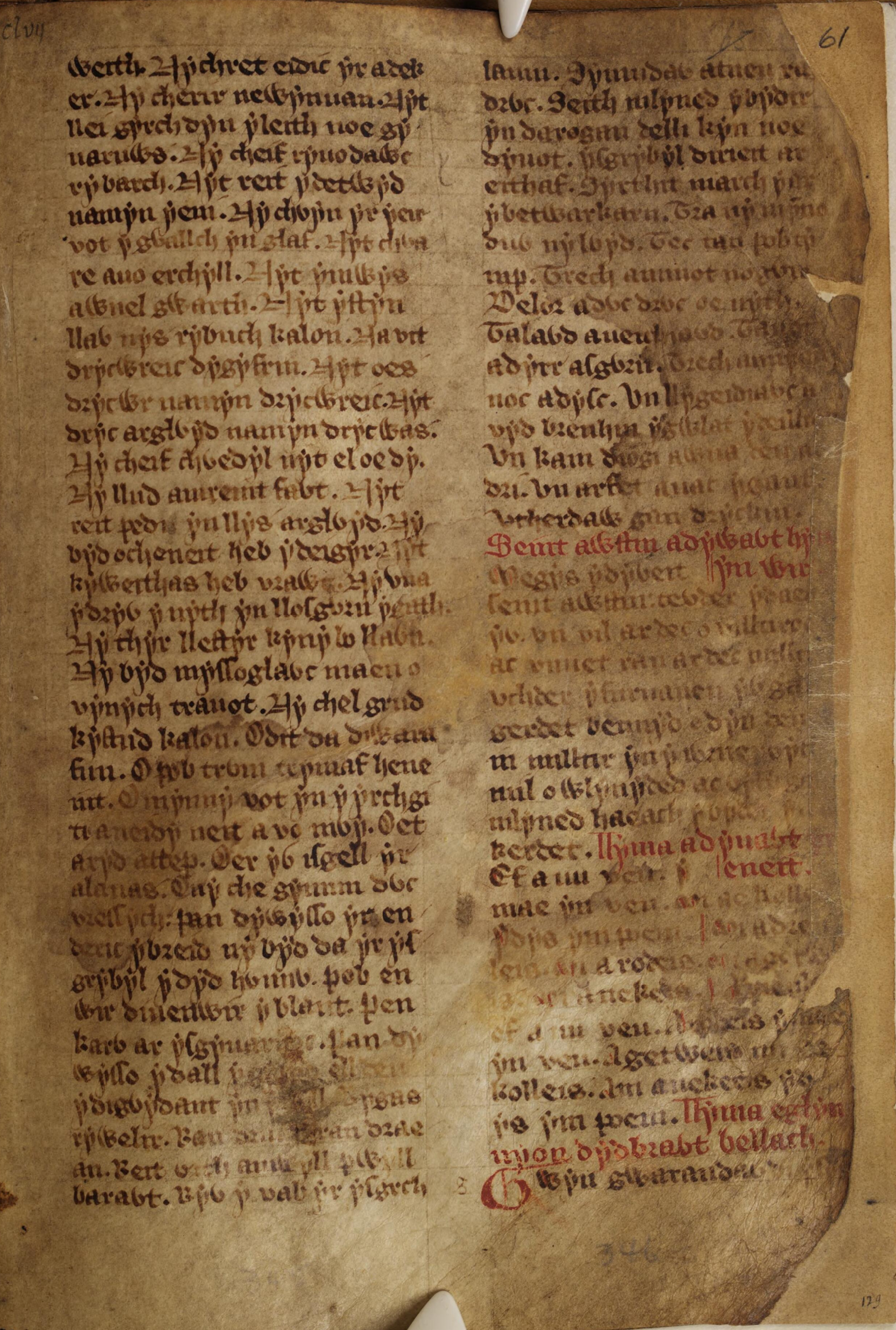
White Book of Rhydderch f.61.r

The White Book of Rhydderch (Welsh: Llyfr Gwyn Rhydderch, National Library of Wales, Peniarth MS 4-5) is one of the most notable and celebrated surviving manuscripts in Welsh. Mostly written in southwest Wales in the middle of the 14th century (c. 1350) it is the earliest collection of Welsh prose texts, though it also contains some examples of early Welsh poetry. It is now part of the collection of the National Library of Wales, having been preserved in the library at Hengwrt, near Dolgellau, Gwynedd, of the 17th century antiquary Robert Vaughan, who inherited it from the calligrapher John Jones and passed it to his descendants. The collection later passed to the newly established National Library of Wales as the Peniarth or Hengwrt-Peniarth Manuscripts.

What was one manuscript was divided into two in the medieval period and has been bound as two separate volumes, known as Peniarth MS 4 and Peniarth MS 5. Peniarth MS 4 contains the most important material: medieval Welsh tales now collectively known as the Mabinogion. Peniarth MS 5 (the first part of the original manuscript) contains Christian religious texts in Welsh, mostly translated from Latin and French, including Lives of various saints and a tale of Charlemagne.

The White Book was copied in the mid 14th century, most probably for Rhydderch ab Ieuan Llwyd (c. 1325–1400) from Parcrhydderch in the parish of Llangeitho in Ceredigion. Rhydderch, who came from a family with a long tradition of literary patronage, held posts under the English Crown but was also an authority on native Welsh law. The hands of five scribes have been identified in the manuscripts, very likely working in Strata Florida Abbey, not far from Rhydderch's home, and certainly in South Wales based on the dialect used by the scribes. The remainder of the name refers to the book being bound in white.

The contents of the manuscript are very similar to the Red Book of Hergest, and may have been its exemplar; but it is more likely that the two descend from a lost common ancestor. The White Book is no longer complete, but it was copied in 1573 by Richard Langford, before some of the text was lost. Langford's copy is itself now lost, but two copies descending from it do survive: Peniarth 111 (made by John Jones of Gellillyfdy in 1607), whose spelling is very close to the White Book's, and London, British Library, Add. MS 31055 (made by Thomas Wiliems in 1596, from a lost intermediary copy made in 1596 by Roger Maurice).

== Sources ==
- 'White Book of Rhydderch'. In Meic Stephens (Ed.) (1998), The new companion to the literature of Wales. Cardiff : University of Wales Press. ISBN 0-7083-1383-3.
- Parry, Thomas (1955), A history of Welsh literature. Translated by H. Idris Bell. Oxford : Clarendon Press.
