= Robert Vaughan (antiquary) =

Welsh antiquarian and collector

Robert Powell Vaughan (1592? – 16 May 1667) was an eminent Welsh antiquary and collector of manuscripts. His collection, later known as the Hengwrt–Peniarth Library from the houses in which it was successively preserved, formed the nucleus of the National Library of Wales, and is still in its care.

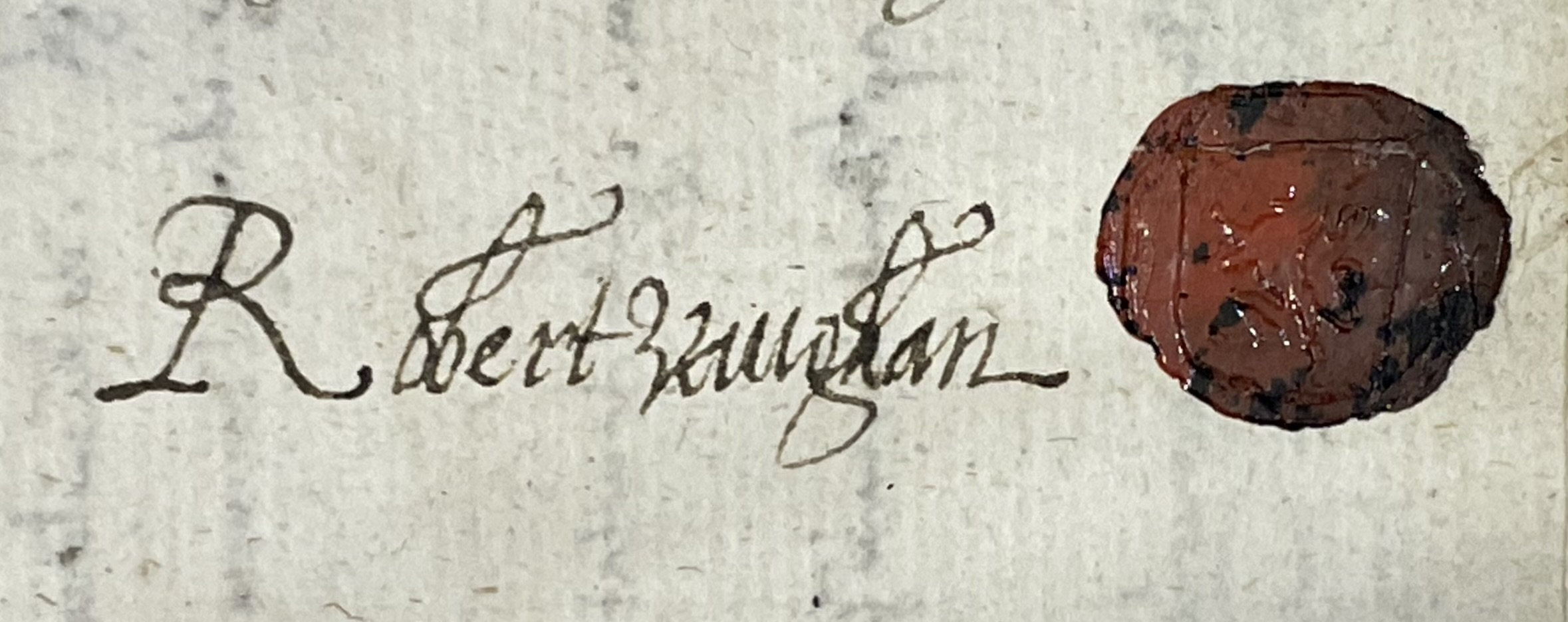
The signature and seal of Robert Vaughan, from NLW MS 9094A

== Biography ==
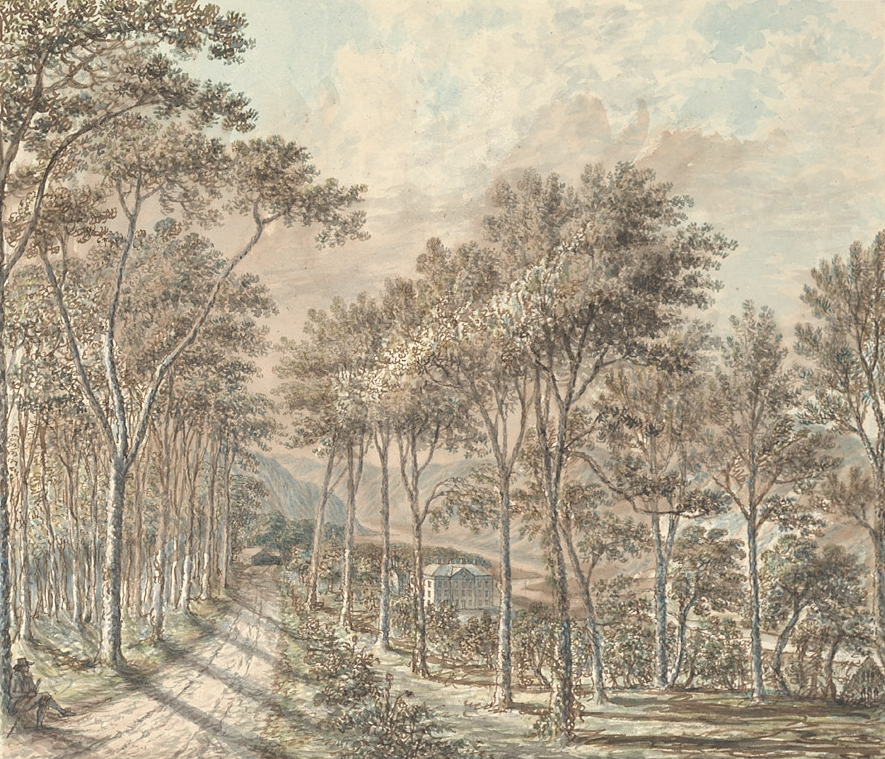
Hengwrt, the seat of the Vaughan family, 1793

Vaughan was born at Gwengraig, Dolgellau, around 1592. Very little is known of his early life, but he was recorded as entering Oriel College, Oxford, in 1612, though he left without taking his degree. He later settled at the mansion of Hengwrt (English: Old Court), Llanelltyd, also near Dolgellau, which had belonged to his mother's family. Vaughan was active in the legal affairs of Merioneth and served on its Commission of the peace.

Vaughan's main interests lay in the early history of Wales and in genealogy. Though these were common enough pursuits for the rural gentry of the time, Vaughan devoted himself to them with great energy and diligence, as well as to the collection of early manuscripts and books which he amassed at Hengwrt, preserving many unique texts which might otherwise have been lost. He was able to increase his holdings further after making an arrangement with the calligrapher and manuscript collector John Jones of Gellilyfdy, Flintshire, in which one would combine both collections on the other's death. Vaughan also transcribed texts himself, carried out genealogical research, made an English translation of the Brut y Tywysogion (or Chronicle of the Princes), and wrote several short historical tracts as well as the book British Antiquities Revived, first published at Oxford in 1662.

He died in 1667 and was buried at Dolgellau. Vaughan had four sons and four daughters, and his descendants remained prominent in the area and its politics for many years. His daughter Jane was amongst the Quakers who emigrated to Pennsylvania in the late 17th century under the leadership of Rowland Ellis. His son, Griffith Vaughan (died c. 1700), settled at the Dolmelynllyn estate in the late seventeenth century; his great-grandson, also Robert Vaughan, sold it approximately a century later.

== The Hengwrt–Peniarth Library ==
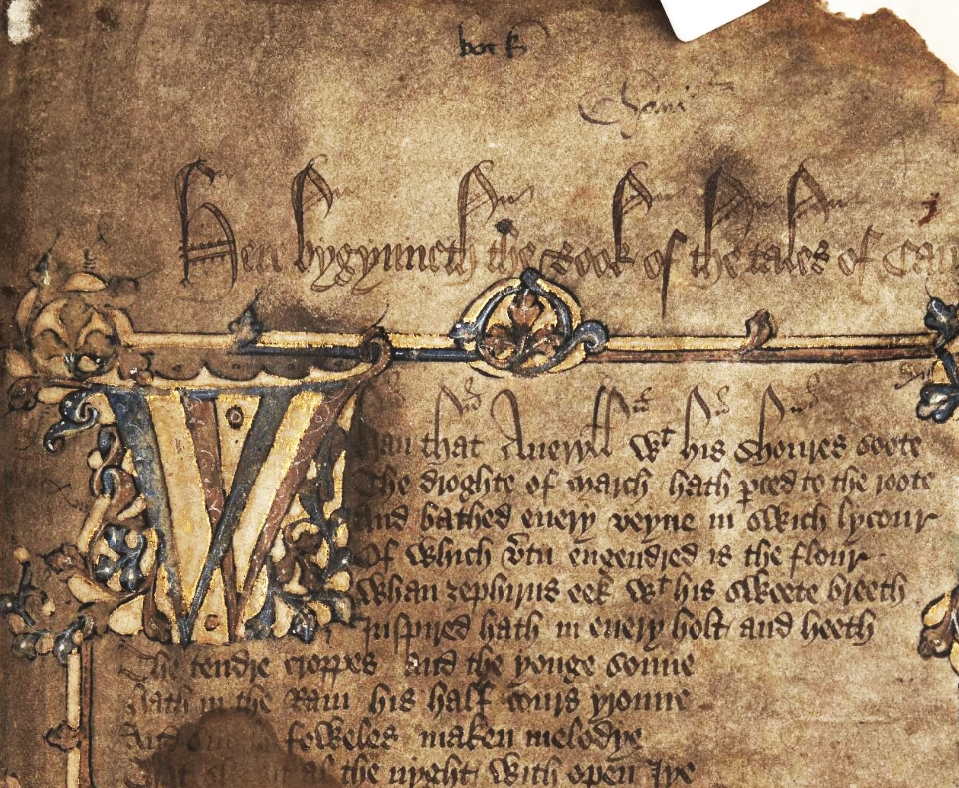
Opening folio of the Hengwrt MS. of the Canterbury Tales, preserved in Vaughan's manuscript collection

Vaughan's remarkable collection of manuscripts remained at Hengwrt in the care of his descendants, though his collection of early printed books was dispersed by a Bristol bookseller early in the 19th century. In 1905, after a long period of negotiation, Sir John Williams acquired a reversionary interest in the manuscripts from the Wynne family of Peniarth, William Watkin Wynne (1801–1880) having added substantially to the collection after being bequeathed it by Sir Robert Vaughan (1803–1859), the Member of Parliament for Merioneth. The Hengwrt–Peniarth library was then moved to Aberystwyth, where the National Library of Wales was to be established.

Vaughan's collection contains several texts of great historical or literary importance, such as the Book of Taliesin, the so-called Hengwrt Manuscript of Chaucer's Canterbury Tales, now thought to be the earliest known copy, and the Black Book of Carmarthen. He also owned the Hendregadredd manuscript, on which notes by him appear. The manuscript was taken from Hengwrt following the decay of the library after Vaughan's death, before the end of the 18th century.

== See also ==
- Hengwrt Chaucer
- William Maurice (antiquary)
