= Red Book of Hergest =

14th-century Welsh manuscript collection

Red Book of Hergest Llyfr Coch Hergest
- Oxford, Jesus College, MS 111
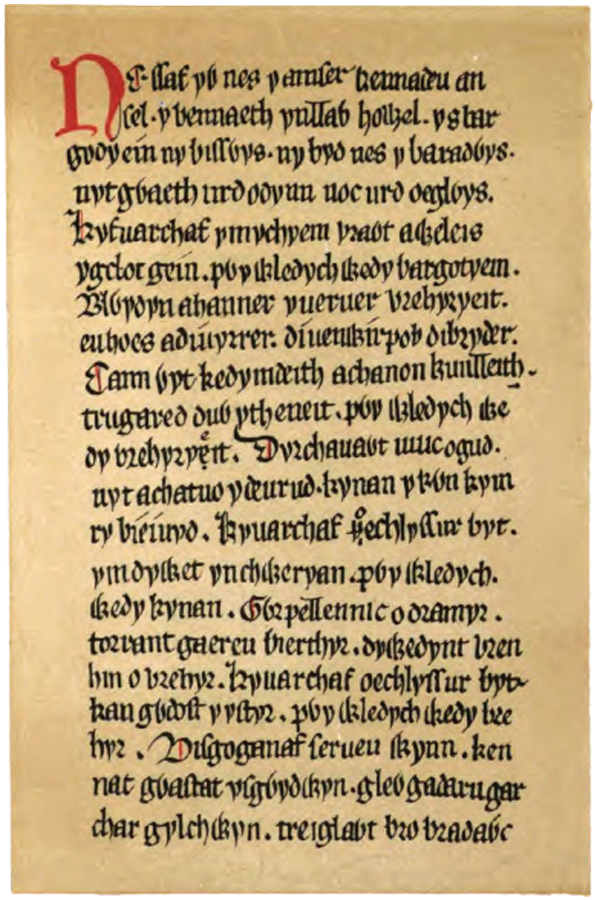
- Facsimile of part of column 579 from the Red Book of Hergest
- Date: shortly after 1382
- Language: Middle Welsh
- Scribe(s): Hywel Fychan and two other scribes
- Patron: Hopcyn ap Tomas
- Material: vellum and leather
- Size: 34 × 21 cm; 362 leaves
- Condition: leaves missing at the end; no original binding
- Contents: early Welsh poetry of the Cynfeirdd and especially, that of the Gogynfeirdd; the Mabinogion; Brut y Brenhinedd; remedies associated with Rhiwallon Feddyg; etc.

The Red Book of Hergest (Welsh: Llyfr Coch Hergest), Oxford, Jesus College, MS 111, is a large vellum manuscript written shortly after 1382, which ranks as one of the most important medieval manuscripts written in the Welsh language. It preserves a collection of Welsh prose and poetry, notably the tales of the Mabinogion and Gogynfeirdd poetry. The manuscript derives its name from the colour of its leather binding and from its association with Hergest Court between the late 15th and early 17th century.

== Compilation ==
The manuscript was written between about 1382 and 1410. One of the several copyists responsible for the manuscript has been identified as Hywel Fychan fab Hywel Goch of Buellt. He is known to have worked for Hopcyn ap Tomas ab Einion (c. 1330–1403) of Ynysforgan, Swansea, and it is possible that the manuscript was compiled for Hopcyn.

According to scholar Daniel Huws, it is "by far the heaviest of the medieval books in Welsh, the largest in its dimensions...and the thickest".

== History ==
The manuscript appears to have been retained by Hopcyn's family until the end of the 15th century, when Hopcyn's grandson Hopcyn ap Rhys was held complicit in the rebellion against King Edward IV and consequently saw much of his property forfeited. The Vaughans of Tretower (Tretŵr), then in Breconshire, obtained it, probably in 1465 on receiving Hopcyn's forfeited possessions. Ownership is suggested by two odes (awdlau), dedicated to Sir Thomas Vaughan (d. 1483) and his sons, which were written into the manuscript by Welsh poet Lewys Glyn Cothi at Tretower. The Red Book soon passed into the possession of the Vaughans of Hergest Court, near Kington in the Welsh Marches. Sir John Price of Brecon reports to have seen the manuscript in 1550, presumably at Hergest. In the late 1560s, William Salesbury found the manuscript in the possession of Sir Henry Sidney at Ludlow, when Siancyn Gwyn of Llanidloes held it on loan from him.

By the early 17th century, the Red Book had passed to the Mansels of Margam, hence back in Glamorgan. It was possibly brought into the marriage between Henry's granddaughter Catherine Sidney and Sir Lewis Mansel, who is reported to have owned it in 1634. The manuscript was later found in the collection of Thomas Wilkins (d. 1699), a Welsh clergyman and antiquarian, who may have borrowed it from the Mansels without ever returning it. In 1697, Wilkins was visited by Edward Lhuyd who spent some time copying a manuscript which might well have been the Red Book.

On 17 February 1701, two years after Wilkins' death, his son Thomas Wilkins the Younger of Llanblethian donated the manuscript to Jesus College, Oxford. Internal evidence, a note by the latter Wilkins, suggests that Edward Lhuyd then held the manuscript on loan, but that the college was able to retrieve it only 13 years later, after Lhuyd's death. The college keeps the manuscript on deposit at the Bodleian Library.

== Content ==
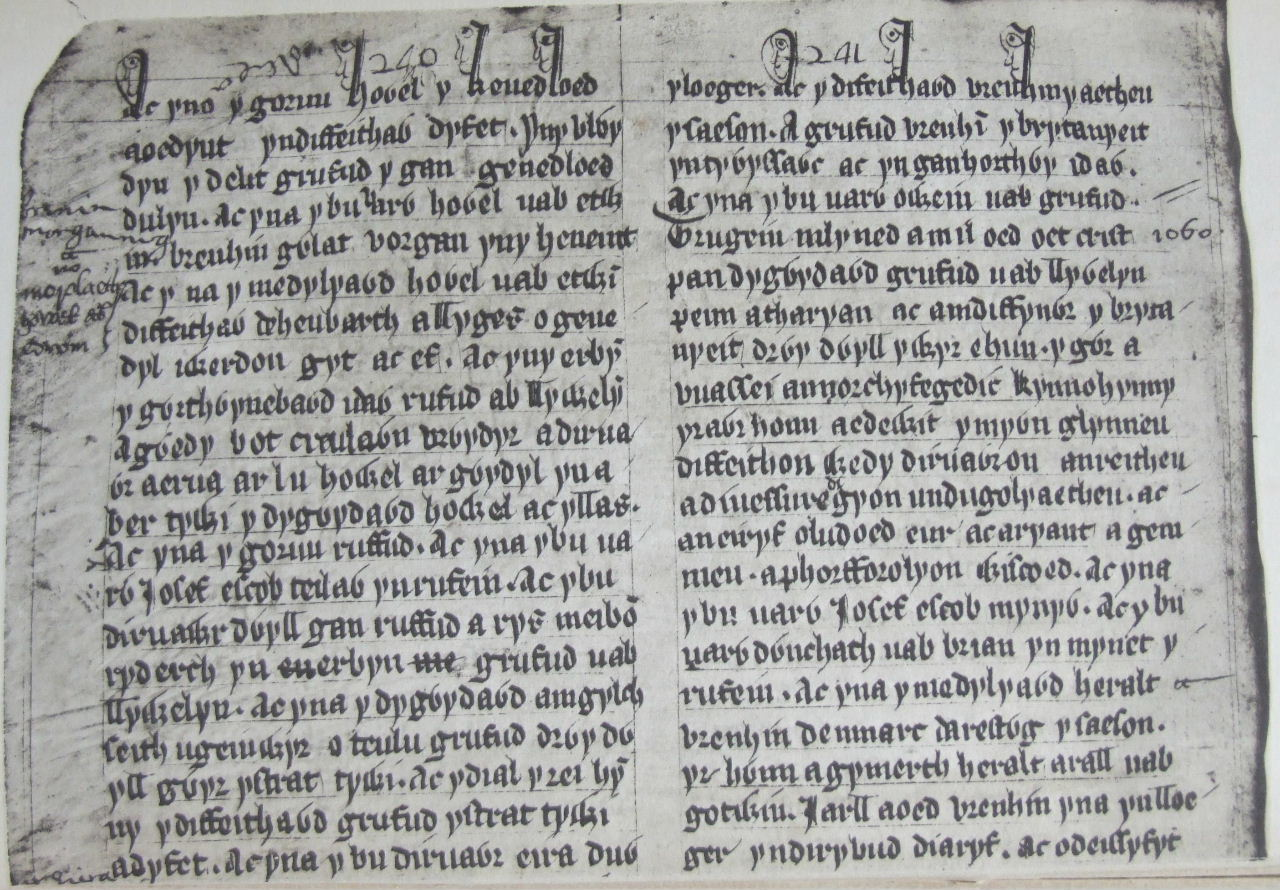
The Red Book of Hergest, columns 240–241.

The first part of the manuscript contains prose, including the Mabinogion, for which this is one of the manuscript sources, other tales, historical texts (including a Welsh translation of Geoffrey of Monmouth's Historia Regum Britanniae), and various other texts including a series of Triads. The rest of the manuscript contains poetry, especially from the period of court poetry known as Poetry of the Princes (Welsh: Gogynfeirdd or Beirdd y Tywysogion), including the cycles Canu Llywarch Hen, Canu Urien, and Canu Heledd. It contains also poems by Myrddin Wyllt. The Red Book is similar in content to the White Book of Rhydderch, of which it has at times been supposed to be a copy. Both are now thought, however, to descend from a lost common ancestor or ancestors.

The manuscript also contains a collection of herbal remedies associated with Rhiwallon Feddyg, founder of a medical dynasty that lasted over 500 years – 'The Physicians of Myddfai' from the village of Myddfai just outside Llandovery.

== Influence ==
Some researchers believe that J. R. R. Tolkien borrowed the title for the Red Book of Westmarch, the imagined legendary source of Tolkien's tales.

== See also ==
- Welsh artefacts in museums outside Wales
- White Book of Hergest
- White Book of Rhydderch

== Sources ==
- 'Red book of Hergest'. In Meic Stephens (Ed.) (1998), The new companion to the literature of Wales. Cardiff : University of Wales Press. ISBN 0-7083-1383-3.
- Parry, Thomas; Bell, H. Idris (1955). A History of Welsh Literature. Oxford University Press. ISBN 978-0-19-815208-8 – via Internet Archive.
- Thomas, Richard Biography of Thomas Wilkins, Welsh Biography Online (National Library of Wales)
- Thomas, Graham C. G. (2006). "Llyfr Coch Hergest". In Koch, John T. (ed.). Celtic Culture: A Historical Encyclopedia. Vol. 3. Santa Barbara, Denver, and Oxford: ABC-CLIO. pp. 1172–3.
- "Oxford Jesus College 111: An Electronic Edition". Welsh Prose 1350–1425. 2007.
