= Peniarth =

Hamlet in Powys, Wales

Coordinates: 52.630°N 4.052°W

Peniarth is a village in the community of Meifod, Powys, Wales. It is 87.1 miles (140.2 km) from Cardiff and 156.9 miles (252.5 km) from London.

It is represented in the Senedd by Russell George (Conservative). It is part of the Montgomeryshire constituency in the House of Commons of the UK Parliament.

In 2013, the village was in the news when plans to build a row of electricity pylons was abandoned by National Grid, following local opposition.
