= Dora Herbert Jones =

Welsh singer and administrator

Dora Herbert Jones MBE
- Born: Deborah Jarrett Rowlands; 26 August 1890; Llangollen, Denbighshire, Wales
- Died: 9 January 1974 (aged 83); Tregynon, Powys, Wales
- Citizenship: United Kingdom
- Education: Llangollen County School
- Alma mater: University College of Wales
- Occupations: Administrator; Singer
- Spouse: Herbert Jones (m. 1916; died 1922)
- Children: 2

Dora Herbert Jones MBE (née Rowlands; 26 August 1890 – 9 January 1974) was a Welsh administrator and singer. She began singing while in school and continued doing so while studying at the University College of Wales. Jones was Herbert Lewis' secretary and organised his election campaign in the 1918 general election. She also worked for Viscount Wimborne in Ireland and then at the National Library of Wales. From 1927 to 1942, Jones worked at Gregynog Press and organised the four-day Gregynog Music Festival from 1933 to 1938. She was vice-president and later president of the Welsh Folk Song Society and performed and interpreted folk songs on radio and television. Collections connected to Jones' life are held in both the National Library of Wales and the St Fagans National Museum of History.

== Early life ==
On 26 August 1890, Jones was born in Llangollen, to the Welsh speaking grocer John Rowlands and his wife Eleanor (née Edwards). She was the family's fifth and youngest daughter, and was known as Dora since childhood even though she was baptized as Deborah Jarrett Rowlands. Jones was strongly influenced by the chapel in her youth and was influenced by a local musician at that time. Educated at the Llangollen County School, she sang soprano in a student quartet and also regularly sang solo. She enrolled at the University College of Wales to study for a Welsh degree from 1908. At Aberystwyth, Jones became influenced by the folk song collector and Welsh Folk Song Society founder member Mary Davies when the latter was invited to lecture at the Celtic society in 1910. She had begun to sing Welsh folk songs at the college's concerts and also performed in competition in connection with the Welsh Folk Song Society of which she became a member in 1912.

== Career ==
Following her graduation and the death of her mother in 1912, she did a one-year course in palaeography at Aberystwyth before being appointed secretary to the Flintshire Member of Parliament (MP) Herbert Lewis in 1913, reputedly making Jones the first female House of Commons secretary. Lewis' wife and folk song collector, Ruth, and the composer Morfydd Llwyn Owen came into contact with Jones. Throughout late 1916 and early 1917, she worked as a Red Cross nurse in France supervised by sisters Gwendoline Davies and Margaret Davies. Jones became involved in the Davies sister's campaign Plas Dinam to provide care for French soldiers. In early 1918, Jones conducted undisclosed secret work in the Viceregal Lodge as personal secretary to Viscount Wimborne in Ireland. She travelled frequently by ferry from Holyhead to Dublin due to the threat posed by German submarines and their torpedoes.

She returned to London in 1918 to assist and organise Lewis' campaign for election to the University of Wales seat in that year's General Election, becoming the first female in Britain to serve in the role of an election agent. Jones subsequently worked at the National Library of Wales in Aberystwyth before she was appointed secretary of the Gregynog Press in 1927. She established Gregynog's choir composed of staff members, their families and others from the local area, which held an annual concert every year between 1929 and 1932. Jones helped the press during its most productive period and organised several of its activities such as the four-day Gregynog Music Festival from 1933 to 1938. She remained at Gregynog when it was converted to a Red Cross centre when the Second World War began. She left Gregynog in 1942. Jones went on to work for the Ministry of Labour in Swansea and later Cardiff, where she administered a governmental scheme encouraging young people to remain in education. She subsequently returned to Swansea to become a careers officer at the University College, Swansea before retiring in 1956.

Jones represented Wales at the International Arts Festival held in Prague in October 1928, and inspired the composer Gustav Holst to become interested in Welsh folk songs for his works. From 1927 on, she frequently performed and interpreted folk songs on radio and television on 54 occasions from either the BBC studios in Bangor, Cardiff or Swansea or on outside broadcasts. She wrote, produced and presented programmes in which she talked about Welsh folk music and her final television appearance came in 1969. Jones and colleague Gwen Davies worried for weeks over putting together music, readings and prayers that were appropriate for each occasion at Gregynog but primarily sung Welsh songs either with or without a choir. In 1942, after being a secretary and treasurer, she was elected vice-president of the Welsh Folk Song Society, and was its president from 1972 until her death in 1974.

== Personal life ==
She was married to the Royal Welsh Fusiliers serviceman Herbert Jones from June 1916 until his death in November 1922. They had two children. Jones was appointed MBE in 1967, and died on the Gregynog estate on 9 January 1974. On 9 February, with the warden's permission, a memorial service to commemorate her life was held at Gregynog.

== Legacy ==
Rhidian Griffiths wrote of Jones: "Dora Herbert Jones was a pioneer as an administrator and of the role of women in administration, a pioneer in broadcasting, and one of the committed enthusiasts who preserved and interpreted Welsh folk-songs to a wider audience." Eirene White noted in the book Ladies of Gregynog that Jones was seen by many people as "secretary to the Press" but for others "was a most valued friend, with her warmth, vitality and passionate concern".

A collection of items connected to Jones from the period 1926 to 1935 is stored in the National Library of Wales as part of the Dr J. Lloyd Williams Music MSS and Papers collection, and a collection of papers on her is held by the St Fagans National Museum of History. A photograph of the administrator is held by People's Collection Wales and she has an entry in the Dictionary of Welsh Biography. In mid-2003, a book about Jones entitled Brenhines Powys was written by Gwenan Mair Gibbard and published by Carreg Gwalch. Jones was the subject of the final episode of the 2016 six-part television series Mamwlad gyda Ffion Hague presented by Ffion Hague and broadcast on the Welsh-language S4C channel.
