= O Spiritual Pilgrim =

"O Spiritual Pilgrim" is a part song by Gustav Holst based on the poem "The Gates of Damascus" by James Elroy Flecker. Holst dedicated the piece to Gregynog Hall, the home of the art patrons and philanthropists Gwendoline and Margaret Davies. Holst wrote the piece for soprano and mixed chorus. Michael Short, writing in the liner notes of the 1994 Hyperion Records recording of Holst's part songs wrote that Holst treats the journey in Flecker's poem "as a metaphor of life itself" and it ends "with a quiet evocation of spiritual peace and reassurance".

Holst visited Gregynog in 1933 for its inaugural Festival of Music and Poetry. Holst dedicated the piece "for Gregynog" on the manuscript score of the piece. Holst had originally intended it to be dedicated to Dora Herbert Jones, but she attempted to persuade him to dedicate it to the Gregynog Choir. The piece was written in the last year of Holst's life. Alan Gibbs, writing in Holst Among Friends, speculates that the themes of the poem may have appealed to Holst due to his growing physical weakness. The first public performance of the piece was given by the Gregynog Choir in 1938.

Holst's manuscript score of the piece is in the collection of the National Library of Wales. Margaret Davies donated the score to the library in 1962 along with autographed scores by Walford Davies.
