= Elisabeth de Saedeleer =

Belgian textile artist (1902–1972)

- Born: 17 August 1902; Sint-Martens-Latem, Belgium
- Died: 27 June 1972 (aged 69); Etikhove, Maarkedal, East Flanders, Belgium
- Known for: Textile arts
- Style: Art deco

Elisabeth de Saedeleer (17 August 1902 – 27 June 1972) was a Belgian textile artist. She learned traditional weaving techniques in Wales, where she was a refugee during World War I, and founded a weaving workshop after returning to Belgium. Her workshop was known for producing handwoven carpets and the fabric for scarves and tablecloths in art deco styles.

== Family ==
Elisabeth de Saedeleer was born in the Dutch-speaking Belgian village of Sint-Martens-Latem, near Ghent, on 17 August 1902. Her father was the expressionist painter Valerius de Saedeleer (1867–1941) and her mother was Clementina de Saedeleer (née Limpens, 1867–1930). She was the second eldest of their five daughters. Her godfather was the painter Gustave van de Woestijne.

== Early life in Wales ==
After the outbreak of World War I, de Saedeleer and her family fled from their home, along with the painter Gustave van de Woestijne and sculptor George Minne, and their families. They fled to Sint Anna ter Muiden in Zeeland, the Netherlands. These Belgian artists and their families were then invited to move to Rhydyfelin near Aberystwyth, Ceredigion, Wales, by David Davies, 1st Baron Davies, Gwendoline Davies and Margaret Davies.

While living at Tynlon House in Wales, de Saedeleer and her sister Marie learned traditional weaving techniques and met a former employee of the English textile artist William Morris. They weaved designs after drawings produced by their father. In April 1919, their works were sold at an exhibition of Belgian art held at the University of Aberystwyth. In 1920, de Saedeleer and her sister Marie moved to Gregynog Hall in Tregynon, intending to establish a rural an arts and crafts centre, but this was not opened.

== Artistic career in Belgium ==
In 1921, de Saedeleer and her family returned to Belgium, where on 12 September 1926 she founded the weaving workshop "Société de Tapis d'Art De Saedeleer et Cie" (also known as "Le Studio de Saedeleer") in Etikhove, with her father and sisters. De Saedeleer aimed to "contribute to the revival of a cottage industry that she considered very suitable for women" through the workshop, and a party was held in the village square in 1927 to celebrate the opening of the studio. The workshop was later transferred to Koekelberg in the Brussels-Capital Region, in 1929.

De Saedeleer's art deco textile works featured soft colour tones, geometry and stylized motifs. Her workshop was known for producing handwoven carpets and the fabric for scarves and tablecloths, In 1923, de Saedeleer was commissioned to weave the main staircase carpet for Luxembourg Palace, the seat of the Senate of France in Paris. She was asked to weave tapestries to show at the 1925 International Exhibition of Modern Decorative and Industrial Arts, also in Paris.

In 1927, de Saedeleer was approached to teach at La Cambre, the newly founded design school in Brussels, by the founding director Henry van de Velde. She took charge of the textile arts department. From the 1940s, de Saedeleer wove small figurative wall hangings. Her work was also displayed at the art deco style church National Basilica of the Sacred Heart of Koekelberg, built from 1930.

In 1954, her work was shown in the "Musée des Arts Décoratifs" exhibition at the Design Museum Gent. In 1958, her work was shown at Expo 58.

In 1955, de Saedeleer wrote that "skilled craft" of weaving was "in danger of disappearing." She continued to teach weaving techniques in Belgium until her death.

== Death ==
Elisabeth de Saedeleer died in Etikhove on 27 June 1972.
