= Prom on The Close =

Annual outdoor concert in Bristol, UK

Prom on The Close is an open-air musical concert which was established in 2002. It his held annually in July on the grounds of Clifton College and attracts an average audience of 10,000 people.

== 2004 Line-up ==
Aled Jones
Royal Philharmonic Orchestra - conducted by Peter Stark

== 2005 Line-up ==
José Carreras
Royal Philharmonic Orchestra
Tina Gorina
Julia Hwang - accompanied by Mark Swinton

== 2006 Line-up ==
Lesley Garrett
Royal Philharmonic Orchestra - conducted by Philip Ellis
Ha-Young Jung
Julia Hwang
Lana Trimmer
Clifton College Chapel Choir

== 2007 Line-up ==
Russell Watson
All Angels
Royal Philharmonic Orchestra - conducted by Philip Ellis
Ha-Young Jung
Julia Hwang
Clifton College Chapel Choir
The Battle of Britain Memorial Flight

== 2008 Line-up ==
Lesley Garrett
Royal Philharmonic Orchestra - conducted by Philip Ellis
Paul Austin Kelly
Emerald Ensemble
Clifton College Chapel Choir
The Battle of Britain Memorial Flight

Winners of the nationwide "I Dreamed a Dream" competition, 19-year-old Eleanor Sandars from Congesbury and 14-year-old Londoner George Pelham.
