= Gregynog Young Musicians Competition =

Gregynog Young Musician
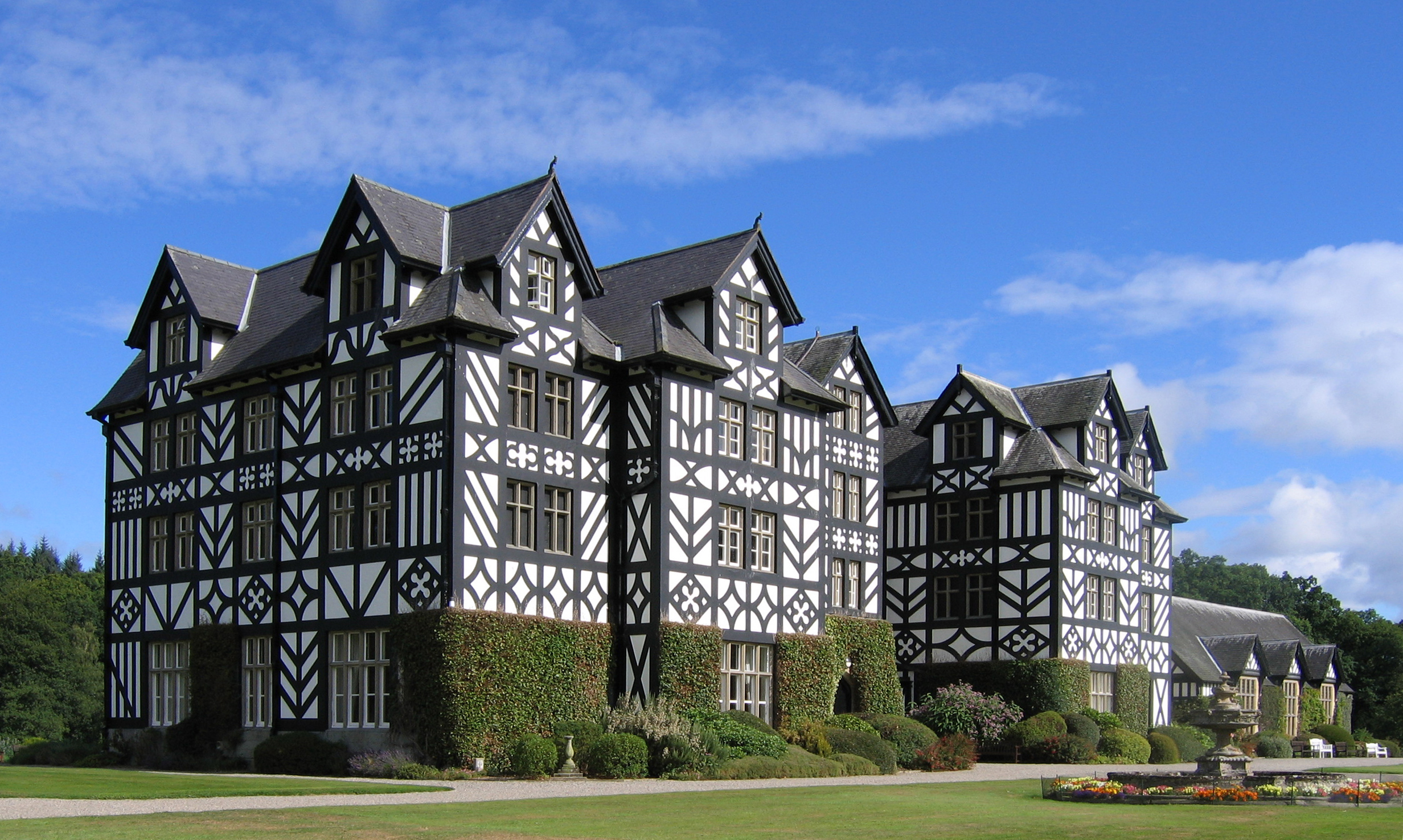
- Gregynog Hall, Tregynon in 2005 - competition venue
- Awarded for: Exceptional musical talent
- Country: United Kingdom
- Presented by: Gregynog Young Musicians Committee
- First award: 2005
- Final award: 2021
- Website: Gregynog Young Musician website

Gregynog Young Musicians Competition began in 2005, originally as part of the Gregynog Festival, and more recently as a free-standing event. It is held at Gregynog Hall in Mid Wales and is open to instrumentalists aged 18 and under.

Winners have been:

Year	Winner	Instrument
2005	Cai Isfryn	Trumpet
2006	Helen Pugh	Piano
2007	Glain Dafydd	Harp
2008	Julia Hwang	Violin
2009	Steffan Morris	'Cello
2010	Chloe-Angharad Bradshaw	Flute
2011	Andrew Reynish	'Cello
2012	Tom Blomfield	Oboe
2013	Charlie Lovell-Jones	Violin
2014	Juliana Myslov	Harp
2015	Sheku Kanneh-Mason	'Cello
2016	Kirsty Chaplin	Piano
2017	Nikita Burzanitsa	Piano
2018	Willard Carter	'Cello
2019	Ellis Thomas	Piano
2020 (Held Online)	Sofia Matvienko	Flute
2021	Oliver Simpson	'Cello

== Category Winners ==
In 2013, the structure of the competition was changed and 5 separate categories were introduced; 'Gregynog Young String Player of the Year', 'Gregynog Young Pianist of the Year', 'Gregynog Young Woodwind Player of the Year', 'Gregynog Young Brass Player' and 'Gregynog Young Harpist / Guitarist / Percussionist of the Year'. The 'Young Accompanist Prize' was also instituted for accompanists aged 23 and under. The competition rules allow joint winners in a single category should a winner not be identified in another category.

Category winners have been:

Year	Name	Category
2013	Charlie Lovell-Jones^{*}	Young String Player of the Year
2013	Iwan Wyn Owen	Young Pianist of the Year
2013	Daniel Shao	Young Woodwind Player of the Year
2013	Rhiannon Symonds	Young Brass Player of the Year
2013	Louis Brookes	Young Guitarist of the Year
2014	Juliana Myslov^{*}	Young Harpist of the Year
2014	Sheku Kanneh-Mason	Young String Player of the Year
2014	Nurry Lee	Young Pianist of the Year
2014	Epsie Thompson	Young Woodwind Player of the Year
2014	Grady Hassan	Young Brass Player of the Year
2014	Isata Kanneh-Mason	Young Accompanist Prize and Chairman's Trophy
2015	Sheku Kanneh-Mason^{*}	Young String Player of the Year
2015	Benjamin Goldscheider	Young Brass Player of the Year
2015	Daniel Scott	Young Woodwind Player of the Year
2015	Alexandra Whittingham	Young Guitarist of the Year
2015	Janeba Kanneh-Mason	Young Pianist of the Year
2016	Kirsty Chaplin^{*}	Young Pianist of the Year
2016	Benjamin Goldscheider	Young Brass Player of the Year
2016	Henry Newbould	Young Woodwind Player of the Year
2016	Isobel Howard	Young String Player of the Year
2016	Heledd Gwynant	Young Percussionist of the Year
2016	Conal Bembridge-Sayers	Young Accompanist Prize and Chairman's Trophy
2017	Nikita Burzanitsa^{*}	Young Pianist of the Year
2017	Tianlang Zhou	Young Pianist of the Year
2017	Chloe Ellen Jones	Young Woodwind Player of the Year
2017	George Strivens	Young Brass Player of the Year
2017	Willard Carter	Young String Player of the Year
2017	Hannah Brookes-Hughes	Young String Player of the Year
2018	Willard Carter^{*}	Young String Player of the Year
2018	Joel Munday	Young String Player of the Year
2018	Chloe Ellen Jones	Young Woodwind Player of the Year
2018	Ewan Millar	Young Woodwind Player of the Year
2018	Huw Boucher	Young Harpist of the Year
2018	George Strivens	Young Brass Player of the Year
2018	Julian Trevelyan	Young Accompanist Prize
2019	Ellis Thomas^{*}	Young Pianist of the Year
2019	Sofia Matvienko	Young Woodwind Player of the Year
2019	Danushka Edirisinghe	Young String Player of the Year
2019	Huw Boucher	Young Harpist of the Year
2019	Avishka Edirisinghe	Young Accompanist Prize
2020 (Held Online)	Sofia Matvienko^{*}	Young Woodwind Player of the Year
2020 (Held Online)	Hui Hing Ngai	Young Brass Player of the Year
2020 (Held Online)	Owen Putter	Young Pianist of the Year
2020 (Held Online)	Haru Ogiwara	Young String Player of the Year
2021	Oliver Simpson^{*}	Young String Player of the Year
2021	Una Pavlovic-Alldridge	Young String Player of the Year
2021	Firoze Madon	Young Pianist of the Year
2021	Jessica Ellis	Young Woodwind Player of the Year
2021	Rosie Gill	Young Harpist of the Year

^{*}Overall Winner
