= David Haberly =

David T. Haberly is professor of Portuguese at the University of Virginia. He holds an AB, MA, and PhD from Harvard University. He is a specialist on Brazilian literature and culture, but also has wide-ranging comparative interests in the nineteenth-century literatures of Latin America, the United States, and Spain.

== Background ==
Haberly's father, Loyd Haberly, was a noted poet, printer, and educator.

== Published works ==
Haberly's publications on Brazilian literature include Three Sad Races: Racial Identity and National Consciousness in Brazilian Literature (Cambridge University Press, 1983); editorial work, introduction, and two chapters for the third volume of the Cambridge History of Latin American Literature (Cambridge University Press, 1997); and editing Quincas Borba, a novel by Machado de Assis (Oxford University Press, 1999).

He has also written articles on a number of North American writers, including Washington Irving, James Fenimore Cooper, Nathaniel Hawthorne, and Caroline Howard Gilman.
