= Rosemary Brown (spiritualist) =

English self-proclaimed medium

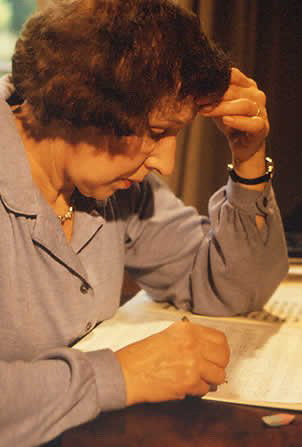
- Rosemary Brown in 1980
- Born: Rosemary Isobel Dickeson; 27 July 1916; London, England, United Kingdom
- Died: 16 November 2001 (aged 85); London, England, United Kingdom
- Occupations: Composer pianist Spirit Medium
- Known for: Presenting new musical works purportedly dictated by deceased famous composers

Rosemary Isabel Brown (nee Dickeson, 27 July 1916 – 16 November 2001) was an English composer, pianist and spirit medium who claimed that dead composers dictated new musical works to her. She created a small media sensation in the 1970s by presenting works purportedly dictated to her by Claude Debussy, Edvard Grieg, Franz Liszt, Franz Schubert, Frédéric Chopin, Igor Stravinsky, Johann Sebastian Bach, Johannes Brahms, Ludwig van Beethoven, Robert Schumann and Sergei Rachmaninoff.

== Life ==
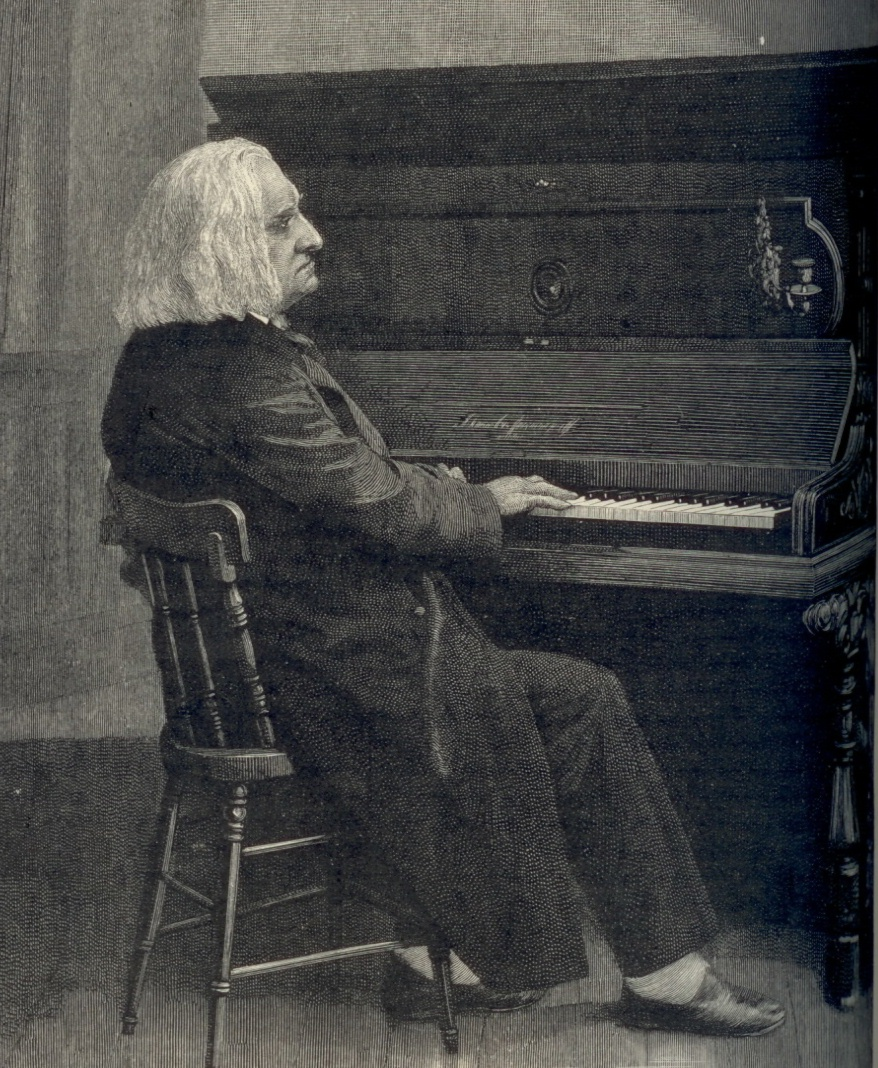
Franz Liszt, one of the deceased musicians Brown claimed to have communicated with

Rosemary Isabel Dickeson was born in London in 1916. She claimed to have been only seven years old when she was first introduced to the world of dead musicians. She reported that a spirit with long white hair and a flowing black cassock appeared and told her he was a composer and would make her a famous musician one day. She did not know who he was until, about ten years later, she saw a picture of Franz Liszt. Many other members of Brown's family were allegedly psychic, including her parents and grandparents.

She worked for the Post Office from the age of 15. In 1948 she acquired a second-hand upright piano, and took some lessons for three years. In 1952 she married Charles Brown, a government scientist. They had a son and a daughter before her husband died in 1961.

Then in 1964 Liszt supposedly renewed contact and Brown began transcribing original compositions she said were dictated to her by great musicians of the past. Brown transcribed pieces from Johannes Brahms, Johann Sebastian Bach, Sergei Rachmaninoff, Franz Schubert, Edvard Grieg, Claude Debussy, Frédéric Chopin, Robert Schumann, Ludwig van Beethoven, Wolfgang Amadeus Mozart and Liszt. These included a 40-page sonata she attributed to Schubert, a Fantaisie-Impromptu in three movements she attributed to Chopin, 12 songs she attributed to Schubert, and two sonatas and two symphonies she attributed to Beethoven.

Brown claimed that each composer had his own way of dictating to her: Liszt controlled her hands for a few bars at a time, and then she wrote down the notes; Chopin told her the notes and pushed her hands on to the right keys; Schubert tried to sing his compositions; and Beethoven and Bach simply dictated the notes. She claimed the composers spoke to her in English.

== Critical reception ==
Brown's claims about spirit communication were disputed by sceptics, although there were a number of musicians and musicologists who supported her claims. Humphrey Searle, who was an authority on Liszt, wrote in his autobiography Quadrille with a Raven, referring to Grubelei, a piece inspired by Liszt: 'It is certainly in keeping with Liszt's experimental style, being mostly written in single notes in each hand; it is highly chromatic, and one hand is written in 5/4 time against 3/2 in the other. The latter is not a thing that Liszt ever did as far as I know, but it is the sort of thing he might have done as I said in my broadcast, which was reproduced on this record sleeve without my knowledge! Since then Fiona and I have got to know Rosemary well and believe her to be perfectly genuine. Even if the pieces dictated to her by dead composers are not masterpieces - although some of them are very nice works - she has had no technical training in composition and could not possibly produce pastiches like, say, those by Joseph Cooper in his TV programme "Face the Music".

Professor Ian Parrott was also a supporter, and participated in a documentary, and wrote Rosemary Brown's obituary for the Guardian: '…Grübelei (meditation), partly dictated under the watchful gaze of BBC reporter Peter Dorling and a television studio crew, is undoubtedly a most spectacular and unusual piece. It has strong harmonies, cross-rhythms and occasional instructions in French - a point conferring authenticity, but difficult to fake. The composer and Liszt specialist Humphrey Searle said: "We must be grateful to Mrs Brown for making it available to us." '

After studying her compositions, musicologists and psychologists came to the conclusion they were the work of Brown's own subconscious. Leonard Zusne and Warren H. Jones in their book Anomalistic Psychology: A Study of Magical Thinking (1989) noted that "Brown wrote hundreds of pieces of music dictated by the various composers. They were passable works, entirely in the style of these composers, but appeared to be simply reworkings of existing pieces."

Professor of psychology John Sloboda wrote that Brown's music offers "the most convincing case of unconscious composition on a large scale."

Psychologist Robert Kastenbaum analysed Brown's music compositions and came to doubt that they were dictated to Brown by spirits of well known composers. According to Kastenbaum:

There is no striking themes, complex structures, depths of feelings, or harmonic, tonal, or rhythmic innovations. During their days on earth all the composers not only created distinguished music but also contributed to the development of compositions for the keyboard. One of the characteristics that made each of them so remarkable was their unpredictability. Their next composition might well open a new domain in musical sensitivity or technique. Alas, they have now all fallen into desuetude. Nothing new shows up to enrich their post-mortem compositions, and nothing surprises, except perhaps the lack of surprises.

Kastenbaum suggested the composers were secondary personalities of Brown herself.

PhD student Erico Bonfim studied a particular sonata by Schubert produced by Brown and said: "…I chose to investigate a sonata attributed to Schubert because Schubert has a very special and particular way of dealing with sonata form. What is very impressive, in this sonata I analysed, we can see all the most important characteristics of Schubert's treatment of sonata form. So this is certainly not a superficial imitation. So when the sceptics claimed that she was making just a superficial imitation, something maybe improvisatory and so on, I don't believe they were accurate – at least regarding some of her better pieces."

Brown maintained that she had never had any musical training aside from a few piano lessons, though paranormal investigator Harry Edwards says:

A perusal of newspaper reports about Ms. Brown elicits contradictory information about her alleged lack of musical education. Originally she stated that she had had no musical training; later she was reported to have had only a couple of years of music lessons, and recently admitted to belonging to a musical household and being a competent musician and pianist.

According to the psychologist Andrew Neher:

[Brown] loved music as a child, there was a piano in her home while she was growing up, her mother played the piano, and she herself took piano lessons. All of this, together with the enhanced skill often displayed in altered states of consciousness, seems sufficient to account for her musical compositions.

Musicologist Denis Matthews described her music as "charming pastiches" and suggested she was re-creating compositions. Similarly Alan Rich, music critic of New York magazine, having heard a privately issued record of Brown's piano pieces, concluded that they were just sub-standard re-workings of some of their purported composers' better-known compositions.

Concert pianists Peter Katin, Philip Gammon, Howard Shelley, Cristina Ortiz and John Lill have all performed her music. Recording artist Moisés Nieto also performed her little piano piece The Waltzing Doll, inspired by Chopin.

Brown was the subject of a BBC Radio 4 drama, The Lambeth Waltz by Daniel Thurman, first broadcast in 2017.

An LP spoofing her work, Rosemary Brown Psyches Again! was issued in 1982 by Enharmonic Records.

== Publications ==
Rosemary Brown published three books:

- Unfinished Symphonies: Voices from the Beyond William Morrow, 1971; ISBN 978-0688026974
- Immortals at My Elbow Bachman & Turner, 1974; ISBN 978-0859740197
- Look Beyond Today Bantam Press, 1986; ISBN 978-0593010419
- Sheet music available at Keturi Musikverlag (Germany)
