= The Beacon Light =

Painting by J. M. W. Turner

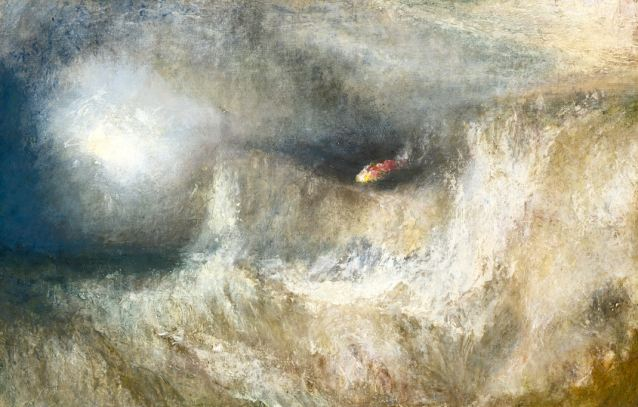
- Artist: J. M. W. Turner
- Medium: Oil on canvas
- Dimensions: 61.5 cm × 96 cm (24.2 in × 38 in)
- Owner: National Museum of Wales
- Accession: NMW A 433
- Website: Painting at Museum Wales

The Beacon Light is a painting by J. M. W. Turner. It was given to the National Museum of Wales by the Davies sisters (Gwendoline and Margaret). For some time it was regarded as a fake, but is now accepted as authentic.

== Provenance ==
Beacon Light was among a number of works that were said to have been given by Turner to his mistress, Mrs Booth. It was sold at Christie's by her son, John Pound (her son by her first marriage).

In 1922, it was sold as a genuine Turner and the Davies sisters (Gwendoline and Margaret) spent £2,625 to buy it. Following the death of Gwendoline Davies, it was among seven works by Turner that were donated to the National Museum of Wales.

== Doubts as to authenticity ==
Shortly after the donation, some raised doubts about its authenticity and that of two other Turners donated by the sisters.

Butlin and Joll dated the work to c. 1835-1840 and suggest that it is a fragment of a larger canvas 'which has certainly been worked on by a hand other than Turner's'. At that time, it was believed to depict the Needles on the Isle of Wight

It was removed from display, but did appear in a 2007 exhibition. It returned to display in September 2012.

== Fake or Fortune? ==
It was featured on the BBC TV programme Fake or Fortune? Scientific analysis showed that the paint used was consistent with Turner's known usage and that the same paint had been used for the whole of the picture. The evidence for the painting's authenticity was presented to Martin Butlin, the co-author of the Turner catalogue raisonné, who accepted that the work was genuine.

=== Location ===
An X-ray showed that a lighthouse at the summit of the bluff had been painted over. Philip Mould and Bendor Grosvenor were able to establish that the scene was in Kent and not on the Isle of Wight as had been previously believed. The coastline depicted is believed to be at St Margaret's at Cliffe, where the dangers posed to shipping by the Goodwin Sands have long been recognised.

== See also ==
- List of paintings by J. M. W. Turner
