= Loyd Haberly =

American poet and educator (1896–1981)

Loyd Haberly (December 9, 1896 – March 27, 1981) was an American poet, letterpress printer, and educator.

== Career ==
Haberly was born in Ellsworth, Iowa, on December 9, 1896, and raised in Iowa and Oregon. After studying at Reed College and Harvard, Haberly was awarded a Rhodes Scholarship to study Law at Trinity College, Oxford. However, he became interested in fine printing while in England and began to print and bind books under his own imprint, the Seven Acres Press. He was named controller of the Gregynog Press, a well-known private press in Wales, in 1933, but his tenure with the press was brief and, by most accounts, less than satisfactory to all concerned.

While with the press he commissioned a typeface, variously known as Paradiso, Gregynog, Gwendoline or Foligno; when he left he was presented with a supply of the type, which he later used, after returning to the United States, in the production of a number of hand-printed limited editions for which he served as author, illustrator, printer, and binder.

In addition to his poetic work and "bookbuilding" activities, Haberly wrote a biography of George Catlin entitled Pursuit of the Horizon, and translated portions of Pliny's Natural History, and also wrote an account of his life as a printer in the United Kingdom. He taught at several universities, most notably Fairleigh Dickinson University in New Jersey, where he became Dean. He died on March 27, 1981. His son, David Haberly, is a noted scholar in the field of Latin American studies.

== Selected bibliography ==
Seven Acres Press publications

- Cymberina 1926.
- When Cupid Wins, None Lose 1927.
- The Sacrifice of Spring 1927.
- John Apostate – An Idyl of the Quays 1927.
- Farewells 1927 (edited by Haberly).
- The Sacrifice of Spring 1927.
- Daneway: a fairy play 1929.
- Poems 1930. Revised trade edition, Oxford University Press, 1931.
- The Copper Coloured Cupid 1931.
- A Merry Christmas 1931.
- The Boy and the Bird 1932.
- The Keeper of the Doves 1933.
- The Antiquary 1933.
- Echo and other poems 1935.

Other publications

- Anne Boleyn and other poems. Gregynog Press, 1934.
- The Crowning Year and other poems. Stoney Down, 1937. Hand-printed by Haberly.
- Mediaeval English Pavingtiles. Shakespeare Head Press, 1937.
- The City of the Sainted King and other poems. Widener Library, 1939. Hand-printed by Haberly.
- The City of the Sainted King and other poems. Second edition. Haberly Press, 1941.
- The Fourth of July. Printed by Loyd Haberly, 1942.
- Almost a Minister. Printed by Loyd Haberly, 1942.
- Artemis a Forest Tale. Printed by Loyd Haberly, 1942.
- Midgetina and the Scapegoat. Printed by Loyd Haberly, 1943.
- Neecha. Printed by Loyd Haberly, 1943.
- Neecha. Second edition. Printed by Loyd Haberly, 1944.
- Silent Fame. Printed by Loyd Haberly, 1944.
- Silent Fame. Second edition, revised. Macmillan, 1945.
- Pursuit of the Horizon: a life of George Catlin. Macmillan, 1948.
- Again and other poems. Printed by Loyd Haberly, 1953.
- Maskerade. Printed by Loyd Haberly, 1957.
- Pliny's Natural History. Frederick Ungar, 1957 (translated and edited by Haberly).
- Sun Chant and other poems. Printed by Loyd Haberly, 1958.
- Highlights. Fairleigh Dickinson University, 1960.
- Newspapers and Newspaper Men of Rutherford. Fairleigh Dickinson University, [1964?].
- Appreciations and Commemorations. Fairleigh Dickinson University, 1966.
- An American Bookbuilder in England and Wales. Bertram Rota, 1979. Autobiography.
