= Gregynog Festival =

Classical music festival in Powys, Wales

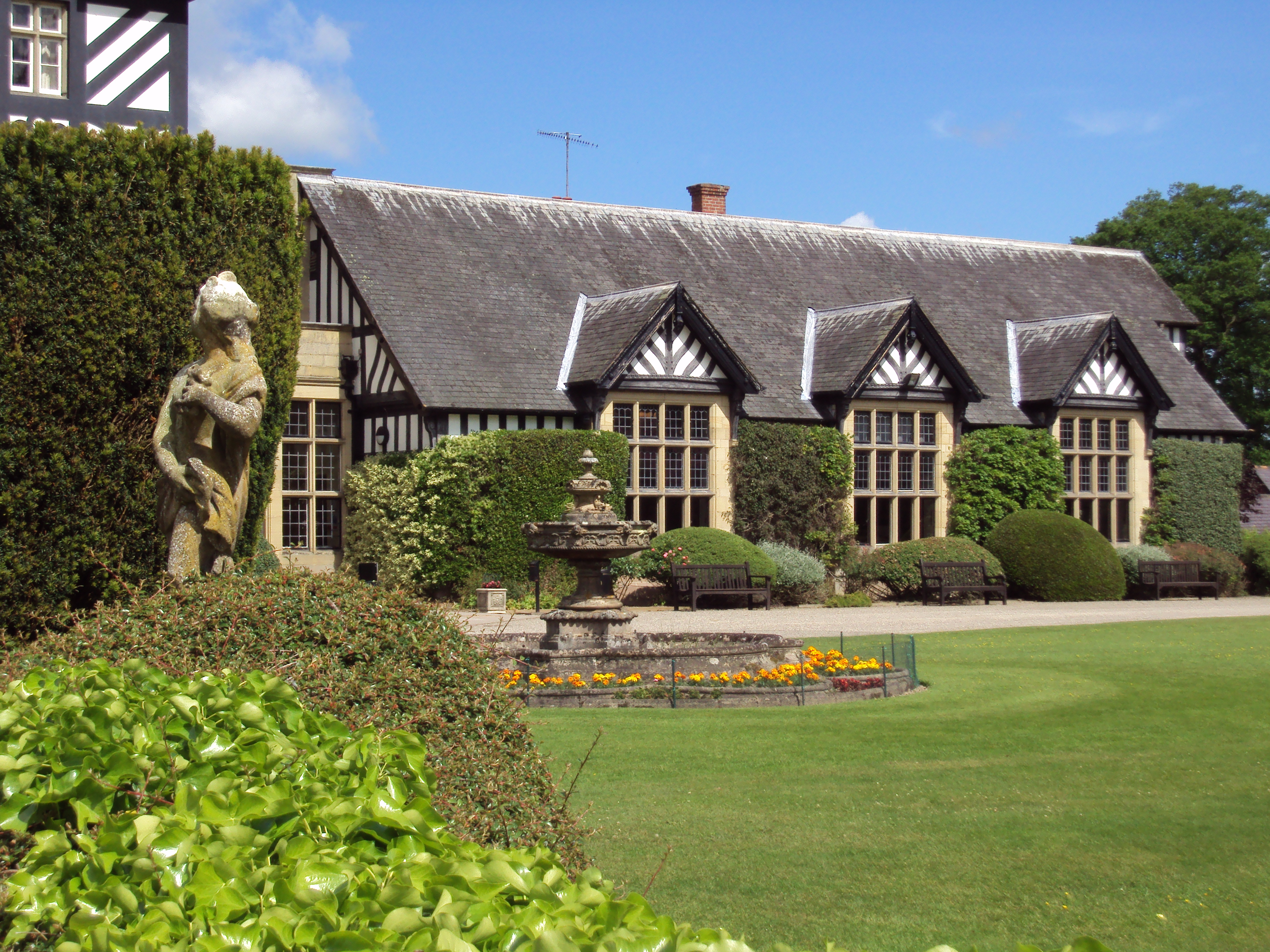
The Music Room, Gregynog

Gregynog Festival (Welsh: Gŵyl Gregynog) is the oldest extant classical music festival in Wales and takes place each summer at Gregynog Hall in the village of Tregynon, near Newtown, Powys, mid-Wales.

In its present form, Gregynog Festival has been running annually since 1988 but it is a revival of festivals held at the same venue from 1933 to 1938 by Gwendoline and Margaret Davies, major patrons of the arts in Wales. The original Festivals were directed by the composer and organist Henry Walford Davies. A sequence of festivals was then held under the direction of the composer Ian Parrott from 1956 to 1961 and a one-off Festival took place in 1972 featuring Benjamin Britten, Peter Pears and Osian Ellis. The modern incarnation was directed by the tenor Anthony Rolfe Johnson from 1988 until his retirement in 2006 when Dr Rhian Davies, the music historian and broadcaster, succeeded as artistic director.

The Festival has hosted many major international performers including Jelly D'Aranyi in the 1930s, Evelyn Barbirolli in the 1950s, and, in its more recent history, John Lill, John Mark Ainsley, Bryn Terfel, Alison Balsom, The Sixteen and The King's Singers.

Gregynog Festival has also hosted world premiere performances by composers including Gustav Holst, William Mathias, Hilary Tann, Huw Watkins and Eric Whitacre.

The 2010 Festival revived music associated with Vauxhall and Ranelagh, the great Pleasure Gardens of Georgian London, and ran from 8–21 June, featuring Emma Kirkby, Catrin Finch and The Academy of Ancient Music.

The 2011 Festival was curated on the theme of Gold and included programmes inspired by alchemy, synaesthesia and the Field of Cloth of Gold. Headline artists included The Cardinall's Musick, Ex Cathedra and Llyr Williams. The 2011 Festival ran between 17 June and 3 July with concerts taking place in Aberystwyth, Kerry, Montgomery and Shrewsbury as well as at Gregynog Hall itself.
