= Nurry Lee =

South Korean British pianist

Nurry Lee 이누리
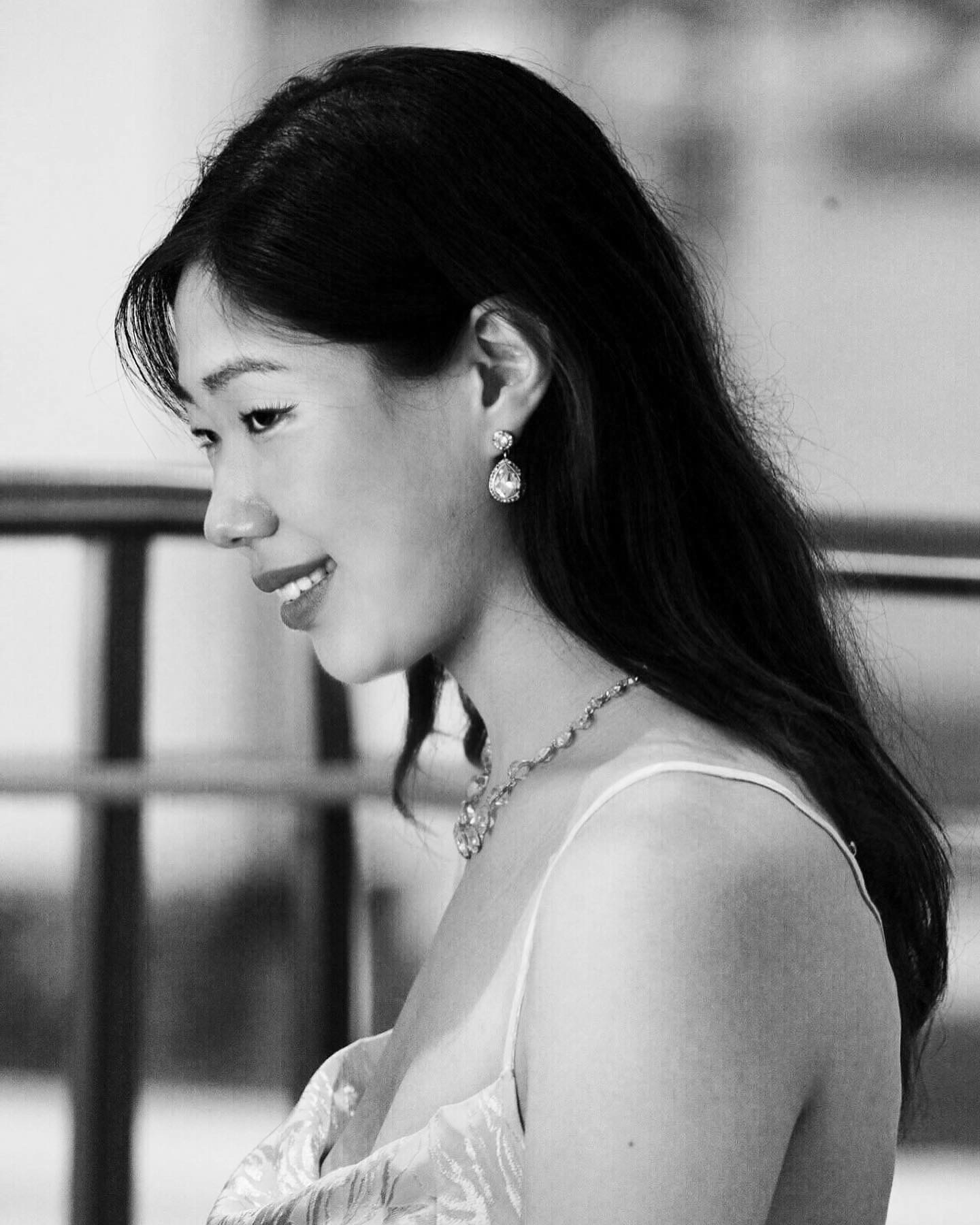
- Nurry Lee at debut concert at Carnegie Hall

Background information
- Born: Nurry Lee; 18 December 1995 (age 30)
- Genres: Classical
- Occupation: International concert pianist
- Instrument: Piano
- Member of: Trio Rouge
- Website: Official Website: www.nurrylee.com

Nurry Lee (born 18 December 1995) is a South Korean-British concert pianist. Nurry Lee has performed in Europe, America, Africa and Asia. She made her debut performance at Carnegie Hall in 2023.

== Early life and education ==
Nurry was born in Reading and began learning to play the piano aged six, giving her first concert three years later. After being awarded a scholarship, she studied at Wells Cathedral School, then attended the Royal College of Music in London where she was awarded the Milstein Award. She then studied at the Korea National University of Arts in Seoul, as well as completing her Artistic Diploma at the Royal Northern College of Music in Manchester where she won first prize at the RNCM Chopin competition. She has been described as a "wonderful pianist" by Grammy-winning pianist Emanuel Ax.

== Career ==
After graduation, Nurry Lee has performed as a soloist and as part of an ensemble. She has performed at Bath Guildhall (her August 2023 debut performance raised money for the Motor Neurone Disease Association), Bath Abbey, Bath Pump Rooms and Bristol's Colston Hall, and has played for the Countess of Wessex. She is a founding member of Trio Rouge which performed live on BBC Radio 3's early evening programme, In Tune, with presenter Sean Rafferty.

Nurry made her debut performance in Seoul in a sold-out candlelight concert, and her international performances include playing with the Dohnanyi Symphony Orchestra. She won first prize at the Piano House International Piano Competition 2023, and made her debut performance at Carnegie Hall in November 2023 where she performed her award winning piece, plus pieces from Franz Liszt and Pyotr Ilyich Tchaikovsky and Mikhail Pletnev's Nutcracker Suite. In July 2024, Nurry became a Kawai official artist.

== Awards ==
- 2014: Gregynog Young Musicians Competition - Young Pianist of the year
- 2021: Royal Northern College Of Music Chopin Piano Competition - winner
- 2023: The Piano House International Piano Competition - Senior Category first prize
