= Ian Parrott =

Anglo-Welsh composer and writer (1916–2012)

Parrott

Ian Parrott (5 March 1916 – 4 September 2012) was a prolific Anglo-Welsh composer and writer on music. His distinctions included the first prize of the Royal Philharmonic Society for his symphonic poem Luxor, and commissions by the BBC and Yale University, and for many leading British musicians. In 1958, his cor anglais concerto was first performed at Cheltenham Festival, and in 1963 his cello concerto was given by William Pleeth and the Hallé Orchestra – both concertos were conducted by Sir John Barbirolli.

== Early life ==
Ian Parrott was born in Streatham, London, in 1916. He first studied at the Royal College of Music. He was a music scholar at New College, Oxford, from 1934 to 1937, where he studied the viola with André Mangeot, and was awarded his doctorate in 1940. War service with the Royal Corps of Signals during World War II took him to Egypt.

== Career ==
After the war, Parrott became a lecturer at Birmingham University from 1946 to 1950. After about 1951, Parrott's compositions became deeply influenced by his interest in the Welsh landscape and culture, when he was appointed Gregynog Chair of Music at Aberystwyth until he retired in 1983,

In 1955, Parrott became a founder member of the Guild for the Promotion of Welsh Music. That year he revived the Gregynog Festival, originally held from 1933 until 1938 by the art patrons Gwendoline and Margaret Davies. He ended it in 1961, but the festival, revived again in 1988, has continued.

Amongst Parrott's writings is The Spiritual Pilgrims, a book on the Davies sisters. He also wrote a book on Elgar for the Master Musicians series. A leading authority on Elgar, Parrott was elected a vice-president of the Elgar Society in 1973. He was also a vice-president of the Peter Warlock Society. Parrott wrote a study of the piano music of Cyril Scott. In 1994, he published The Crying Curlew for Peter Warlock's centenary. His autobiography Parrottcisms appeared in 2003. He died in Aberystwyth, and his funeral was held in St Padarn's Church, Llanbadarn Fawr, where in 1985 he donated a stained glass window entitled "Music in Praise of the Lord".

Parrott composed five symphonies, four operas and many chamber works.

== Selected works ==
Stage

- The Black Ram, opera in 2 acts (1957); libretto by Idris Bell; Welsh text by T. H. Parry-Williams
- Once Upon a Time, opera (1959)

Orchestral

- Pensieri for string orchestra (1950)
- Family Prelude and Fugue for strings and piano (1958)
- Symphony No. 2 (1960)
- Symphony No. 3
- Partita (1967)
- Harrow March (1970)
- Homage to Two Masters (1970)
- Reaching for the Light for chamber orchestra (1971)
- El Alamein, symphonic prelude
- Fanfare Overture
- Luxor, symphonic poem
- Romeo and Juliet, solemn overture
- Seithenin, concert overture
- Suite of Four Shakespeare Dances
- Three Moorish Princesses
- Variations on a Theme of Dufay
- Y fair (Three Ladies Suite)

Wind band

- Land of Song, fantasia on Welsh tunes (1969)

Concertante

- Concerto for English horn (cor anglais) and orchestra (1958)
- Concerto breve for cello and orchestra (1963)
- Concerto for trombone and wind band (1968)
- Concertino (1973)
- Concerto for piano and orchestra
- Prelude and Waltz for recorder or flute and string orchestra
- Sinfonia Concertante for recorder, solo violin, string orchestra and percussion
- Suite for violin and orchestra

Chamber music

- Minuet for oboe and piano (1950)
- Aquarelle for clarinet or viola and piano (1952)
- Welsh Airs, arrangements for 2 descant recorders with piano or harp ad libitum (1955)
- String Quartet No. 2 (1955)
- String Quartet No. 3
- Septete 1962 for flute, clarinet, 2 violins, viola, cello and piano (1962)
- String Quartet No. 4 (1963)
- Pantglas for violin and piano (1967)
- Two Dances for flute and piano (1969)
- Fresh about Cook Strait, Wind Quintet No. 2 for flute, oboe, clarinet, horn and bassoon (1970)
- Devil's Bridge Jaunt for cello and piano (1974)
- Fanfare and March for 2 trumpets, trombone and tuba (1976)
- Gleaming Brass, for 2 trumpets (or cornets), horn, trombone and tuba (1977)
- Rhapsody for trumpet and organ (1977)
- Fantasy-Sonata for clarinet and piano (1982)
- Kaleidoscope for violin, cello and piano (1985)
- Duetto for violin and viola (1986)
- Autumn Landscape for oboe and piano (1987)
- Duo for 2 guitars (1988)
- Fun Fugato and Awkward Waltz for bassoon and piano (1989)
- Arabesque and Dance for flute and piano (or treble recorder and harpsichord) (1990)
- Fantasising on a Welsh Tune: Dygan Caerws, trio for recorder or flute, oboe and piano (1995)
- Portraits for treble recorder or flute and piano (1999)
- Rondo giocoso for bassoon and piano (1999)
- Dialogue and Dance for recorder and organ (2002)
- The Choral Preludes for cello and piano

Harp

- Ceredigion, 3 pieces with interludes (1962)
- Soliloquy and Dance (1974)

Organ

- Toccata in C major (1965)
- Suite [No. 1] (1977)
- Suite No. 2 (1986)

Piano

- Betinka, romance (1940)
- Fanatasy and Allegro for 2 pianos (1946)
- Theme and Six Variants (1947)
- Westerham, rhapsody (1948)
- Aspects (1975)
- Fantasy (1986)
- Theme from a Symphony for piano 4-hands (1986)

Vocal

- I heard a linnet courting for voice and piano (1948); words by Robert Bridges
- In Phaeacia for high voice and piano (1948); words by James Elroy Flecker
- Leaves for voice and piano (1949); words by Elizabeth Ward
- Dafydd y gareg wen for voice and piano (1969)
- Flamingoes for medium voice and piano (1973); words by Jane Wilson
- Two Thoughtful Songs for high voice and piano (1977); words by William Blake and Gerard Manley Hopkins
- No Complaints for voice and piano (1984)
- Eastern Wisdom, 3 songs for voice and small orchestra (1987); words by Luo Yin, Rabindranath Tagore and from Ecclesiasticus
- Song of Joy for voice and piano (1988)
- Aphorisms and Arias of Death and Life for soprano, baritone and piano (1996)
- Nothing like Grog for voice and piano

Choral

- Psalm 91 for bass solo, chorus, semi-chorus and orchestra (1946); Biblical words
- Carol plygain (Dawn Carol) for mixed chorus and piano (1958)
- Can mewn bar salwn (Song in a Saloon Bar), part-song for male voices (tenor, baritone, 2 basses) and piano (1963); words by A. S. J. Tessimond; Welsh words by T. H. Parry-Williams
- The Song of the Stones of Saint David's for chorus and organ (1968)
- Offeren yn arddull canu gwerin (Welsh Folk-Song Mass) for unison chorus, organ or piano and percussion (1974)
- Surely the Lord Is in This Place, introit for mixed chorus a cappella (1977)
- Money Talks for male chorus and piano (1978); words by A. S. J. Tessimond; Welsh translation by T. H. Parry-Williams
- My Cousin Alice for soprano, tenor, mixed chorus, piano and optional tape of North American birds (1982)
- Anthem of Dedication for mixed chorus and organ (1985)
- The Christ Child (The "Mother Christmas" Carol) for mixed chorus with piano or organ (1987); words by Barbara Bonner-Morgan
- My Sweetheart's Like Venus, Welsh folk-song arranged for baritone solo and mixed chorus (1987)
- Master Hughes of Saxe-Gotha (An Unknown Musician) for mixed chorus and piano (1987); words by Robert Browning
- Magnificat and Nunc dimittis, setting for treble voices and organ (1987)
- Adam lay y bounden for unison voices and piano or organ (1990)
- Arglwydd ein Iôr ni (O! Lord Our Sovereign), Psalm 8 for mixed chorus a cappella (1993)

Literary

- Pathways to Modern Music (A. Unwin, 1947)
- A Guide to Musical Thought (Dennis Dobson, 1955)
- Method in Orchestration (Dobson, 1957)
- The Music of "An Adventure" (Regency Press, 1966)
- The Spiritual Pilgrims (Llandybie: C. Davies, 1969)
- Elgar (Dent, 1971)
- The Music of Rosemary Brown (Regency Press, 1978)
- Cyril Scott and His Piano Music (Thames Publishing, 1991)
- The Crying Curlew: Peter Warlock, Family & Influences, Centenary 1994 (Gomer, 1994)
- Parrottcisms: The Autobiography of Ian Parrott (British Music Society, 2003)

== Awards (selected) ==
- 1977, John Edwards Memorial Award from the Guild for the Promotion of Welsh music
- 1994, the first recipient of the Glyndŵr Award for an Outstanding Contribution to the Arts in Wales

== Bibliography ==
- The Spiritual Pilgrims (C. Davies, Llandybie, 1969)
- Elgar (Master Musicians Series) (Dent, London, 1971) ISBN 0-460-03109-0
- The Crying Curlew: Peter Warlock, family & influences (Gomer, Llandysul, 1994) ISBN 1-85902-121-2
- Parrottcisms (British Music Society, Upminster, 2003) ISBN 1-870536-24-X
