= Gregynog Press =

Welsh printing press

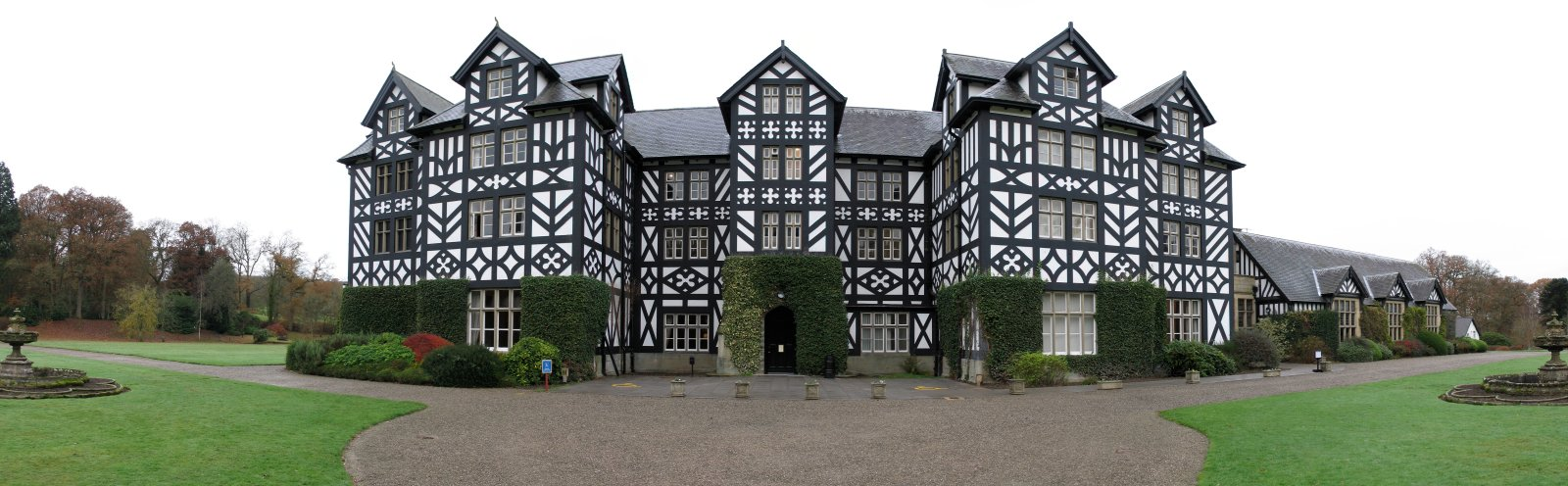
Gregynog Hall

The Gregynog Press, also known as Gwasg Gregynog, is a printing press and charity located at Gregynog Hall near Newtown in Powys, Wales.

== Early years ==
Founded in 1922 by the sisters and art patrons Margaret and Gwendoline Davies, guided by Thomas Jones, the press was named after their mansion Gregynog Hall. Jones remained its chairman throughout its existence. It rose to prominence in the pre-war era as among the more important private presses, publishing limited edition books, primarily on a Victoria platen printing press. Much of the printing work from 1927 to 1936 was carried out by the skilled printer Herbert John Hodgson, who had previously worked on the 1926 edition of the T. E. Lawrence's Seven Pillars of Wisdom. The American poet and printer Loyd Haberly was briefly the controller of the press.

It commissioned a private typeface from Graily Hewitt, Gwendolin, dated 1935. It was manufactured as a private commission by Monotype.

== Reincarnation as Gwasg Gregynog ==
In 1954 after the death of Gwendoline Davies, Margaret donated most of the machinery used by Gregynog Press to the National Library of Wales. The press was reopened under the Welsh title Gwasg Gregynog by the University of Wales in 1978, and production resumed. While the National Library permanently loaned the Press its original Victoria platen press in 1980, since 1986, it has primarily printed with a Heidelberg Cylinder Press. Typesetting of the smallest pieces is done by hand, but otherwise manuscripts are typeset with the use of a Monotype machine. Among the press publications are a series of pamphlets entitled "Beirdd Gregynog / Gregynog Poets": the first of these was Euros Bowen's Yr Alarch, 1987.

Gwasg Gregynog Limited is a company limited by guarantee, which was incorporated on 28 June 1978. It adopted the new Memorandum and Articles of Association on 28 August 2001 and was granted charitable status by the Charity Commission on 11 January 2002 (charity no. 1090060). Intended to benefit and educate the public, it offers lectures related to the press and printing techniques, as well as tours of press facilities, which are dedicated to maintaining traditional printing methods.

The press has been involved in several historic events in Wales in connection with the National Assembly. When the Assembly opened in Wales, the press produced its first documents, including a small hand-bound souvenir volume that served as the Assembly's first publication. Later, in 2006, it bound a poem commissioned to mark the opening of the Senedd, the Assembly's permanent home, and written in calligraphy.
