= Julia Hwang =

South Korean violinist (born 1996)

Julia Hwang (born January 1996) is a South Korean violinist.

Hwang gave her professional solo debut with the English National Baroque Chamber Orchestra at the age of nine, performing Johann Sebastian Bach's Concerto in A minor, and in the same year performed for violinist Ivry Gitlis in London. Three years later, at the age of 12, she performed Nigel Hess's Ladies in Lavender with the Royal Philharmonic Orchestra.

Hwang has been a veteran of the concert stage for many years and her numerous solo appearances with orchestras internationally have led to an ever-increasing schedule of concerts both in the UK and abroad. She has appeared many times on live television and radio through the BBC and ITV, and in 2012, she was featured in a BBC4 documentary about the nation’s favourite composition The Lark Ascending by Ralph Vaughan Williams. Her performance of this work was specifically chosen by the BBC to represent this timeless classic of the great British composer. Among numerous other public performances, Hwang has particularly enjoyed her concerts for charity work and also playing at Clifton College's Proms on the Close, performing alongside musicians José Carreras, Oscar Osicki, Lesley Garrett and Russell Watson.

Hwang released her debut CD in November 2007. The following year she obtained a Diploma ABRSM with distinction, and released her second CD, 'My Recital'.

In 2008 she was the winner of the Gregynog Young Musician competition. and was awarded the honour of "Jeune Espoir" (young hope) Laureate at the Concours Internationaux de Musique Academie de Val d'Isère

She attended Clifton College, where she was an academic and music scholar. Other public and charity performances have included:

- The 2012 Violins for Hope music festival in Charlotte, North Carolina, US, with violinist Shlomo Mintz.
- A charity concert at Highgrove to raise funds for The Prince's Trust alongside cellist Julian Lloyd Webber.
- Innumerable further concerts to raise money for, among others, BRACE, The Alzheimer's Society, the NSPCC and MacMillan Cancer Relief.

Hwang was offered an academic scholarship from St John’s College, Cambridge, to study for a degree in Music and a full scholarship to the Royal College of Music, London. She is now studying Music as an undergraduate at Cambridge.

She currently studies with Professor Itzhak Rashkovsky at the Royal College of Music, London.

Hwang plays on a Peter Guarnerius of Mantua, c.1698.
