= Valerius de Saedeleer =

Belgian expressionist painter (1867–1941)

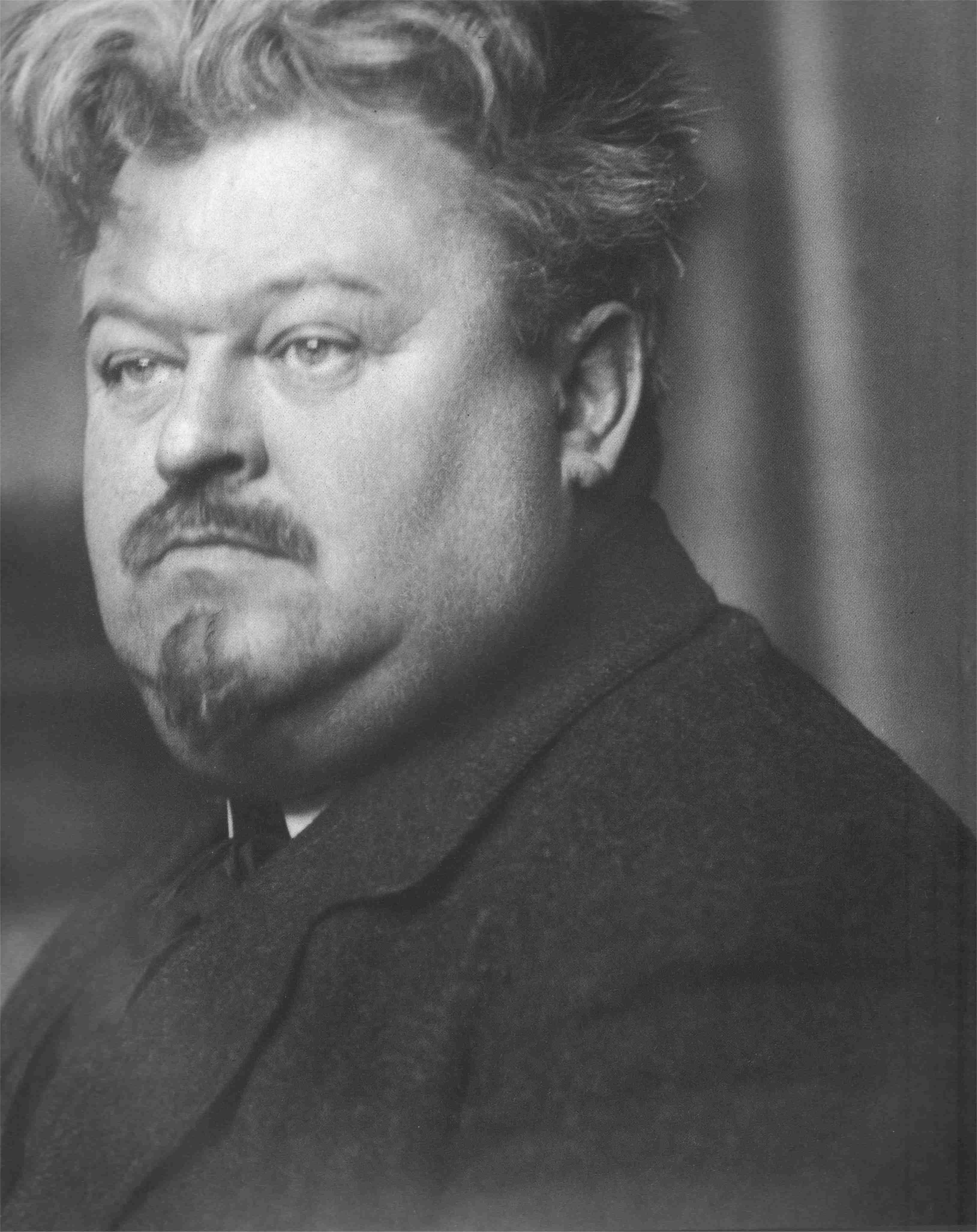
Valerius de Saedeleer

Valerius de Saedeleer or Valerius De Saedeleer (4 August 1867 – 16 September 1941) was a Belgian landscape painter, whose works are informed by a Symbolist and mystic-religious sensitivity and the traditions of 16th-century Flemish landscape painting. He was one of the main figures in the so-called first School of Latem which in the first decade of the 20th century introduced modernist trends in Belgian painting and sculpture.

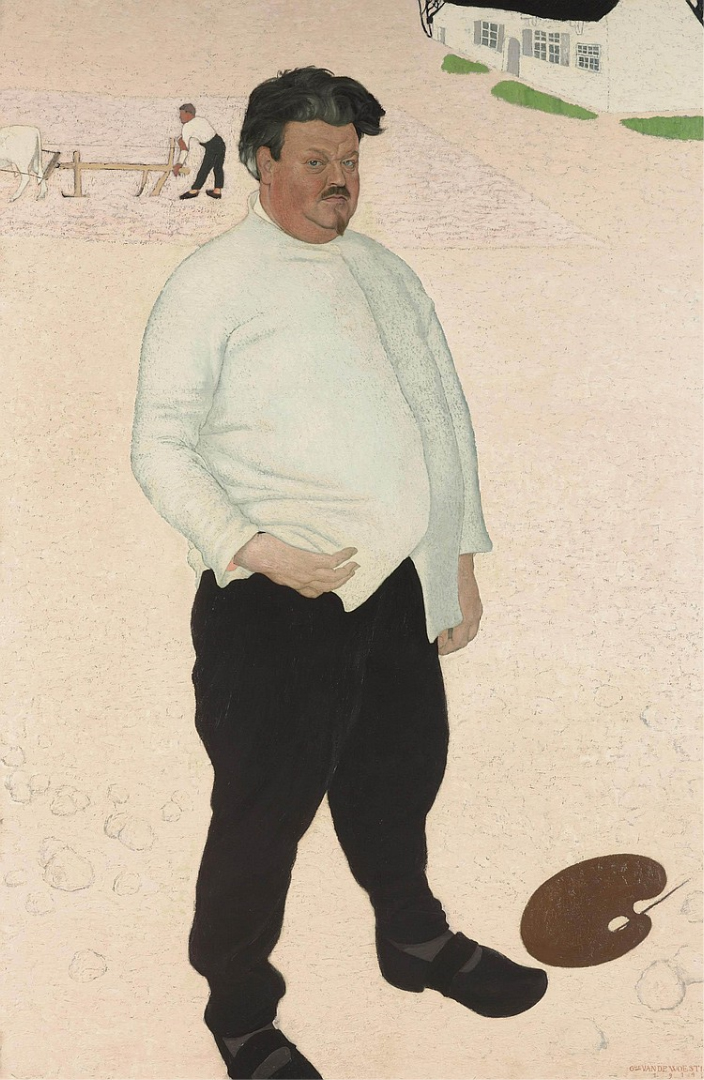
Gustave Van de Woestyne – Portrait of Valerius De Saedeleer 1914.

== Life ==
=== Beginnings ===
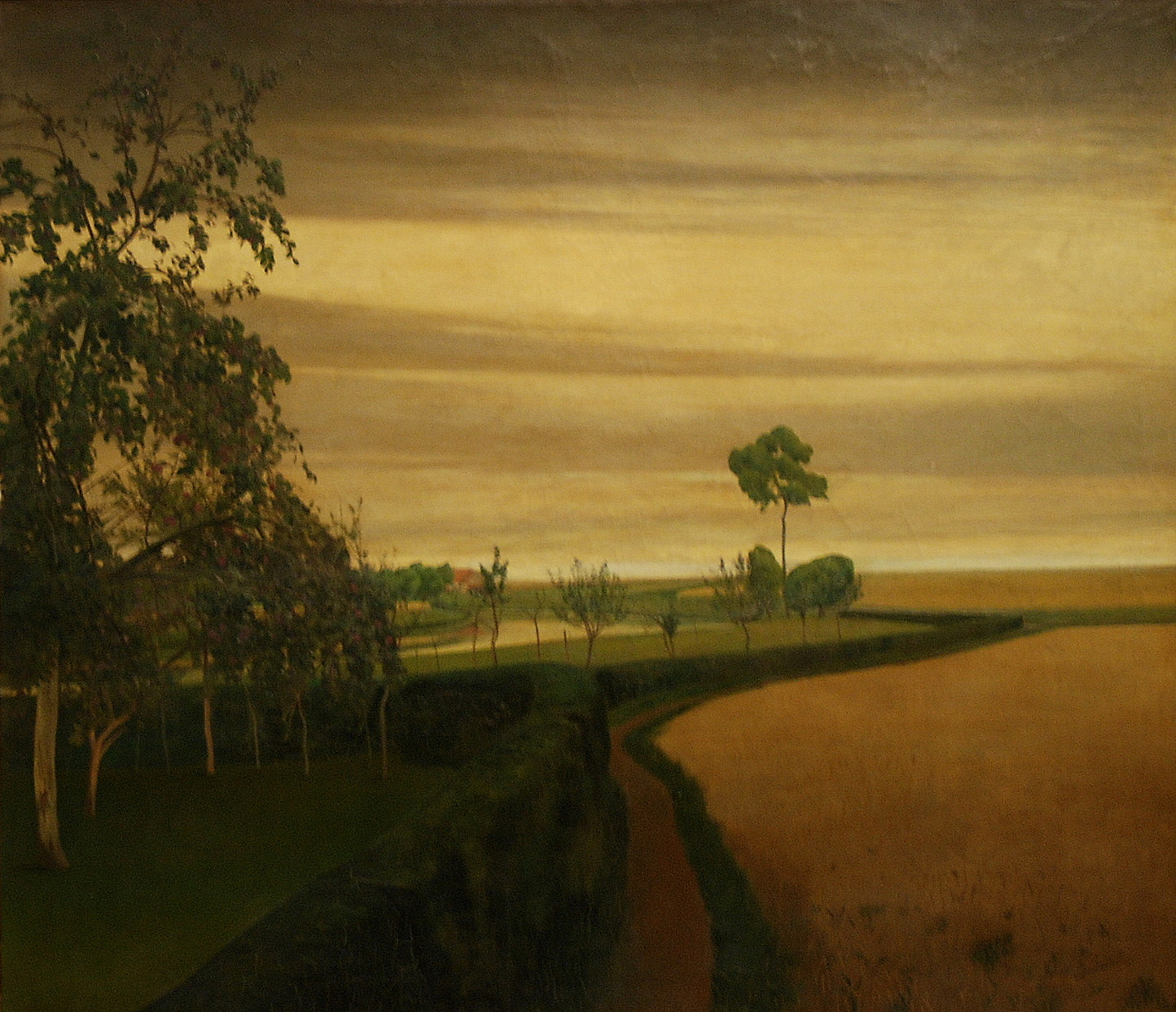
The end of a gloomy day

Valerius de Saedeleer was born in Aalst, Belgium, as the son of a small businessman who operated a soda and soap making factory. As a result of conflicts with his parents and problems at school, he left school at age fifteen and was forced by his father to study an acceptable profession. To this end, he was employed as an apprentice at a Ghent weaving workshop and took classes in weaving at an industrial school in Ghent. Without his parents' knowledge he enrolled at the Academy of Fine Arts in Ghent, where he met Théo van Rysselberghe and George Minne.

=== Wandering existence ===
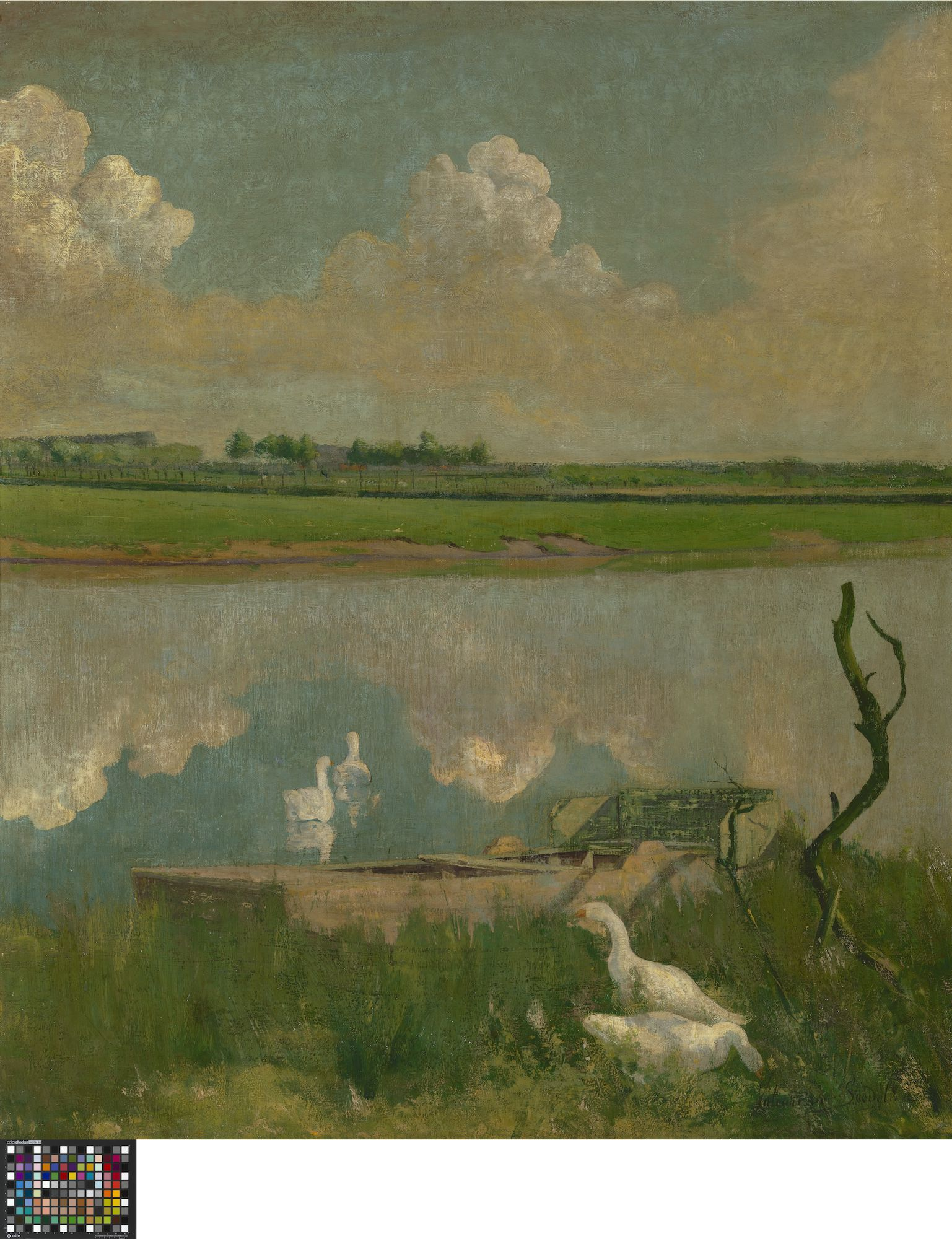
Geese on the Meadows Museum van Deinze en de Leiestreek

Unhappy with the academic teaching at the Ghent Academy, he moved to Brussels where he studied for four years with the impressionist landscape painter Franz Courtens. He then started working as an independent artist. In his early work, the artist remained indebted to his teacher Courtens and was influenced by Emile Claus. This showed he was still searching for his own style.

On 14 November 1889 the young artist married in Aalst Clementina 'Clemmeke' Limpens (1867–1930), a grocer's daughter from Erembodegem, near Aalst. They had five daughters, of which the second, Elisabeth de Saedeleer (1902–1972), became an artist in her own right. The father of de Saedeleer's wife gave her a large sum of money as dowry. The young couple used the funds to establish a grocery in Blankenberge. The bankruptcy that followed quickly led to the couple's wandering and destitute existence.

They lived for short periods in Blankenberge, Wenduine, Damme and Ghent. In 1892 the couple lived in Afsnee, near Ghent, where de Saedeleer met Albijn Van den Abeele. Albijn Van den Abeele was the town clerk of Sint-Marten-Latem (often referred to by its shorter form 'Latem') and an amateur painter. He arranged for cheap lodging for artists in Sint-Marten-Latem and thereby supported the launch of one of the most important artistic movements in early-20th-century Belgium. From April to October 1893 de Saedeleer lived in Sint-Martens-Latem. Here he reconnected with his friend George Minne and met the young student and aspiring poet Karel van de Woestijne. Between 1895 and 1898 de Saedeleer and his wife lived in Lissewege where they raised chickens.

=== Maturity ===
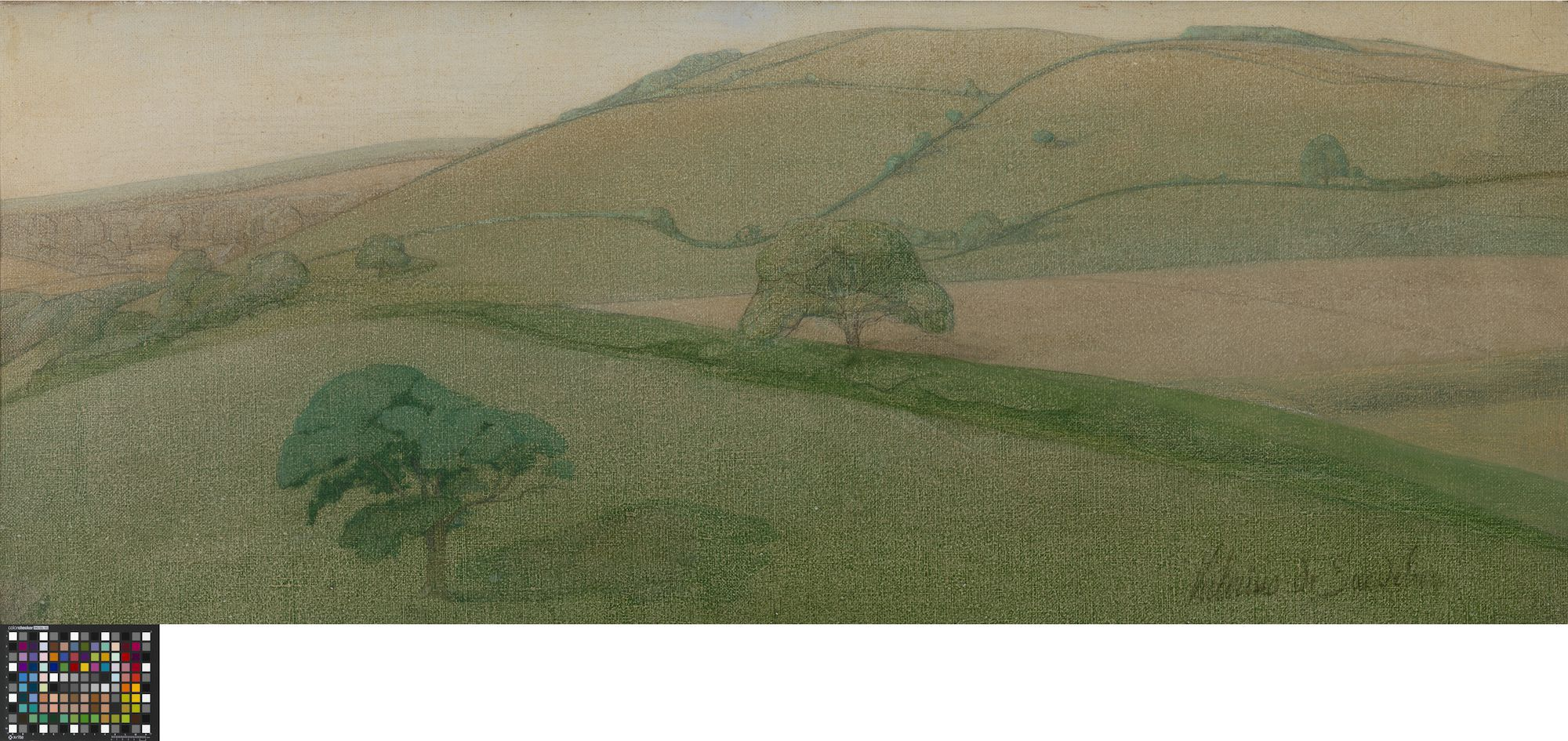
Landscape in Wales Museum van Deinze en de Leiestreek

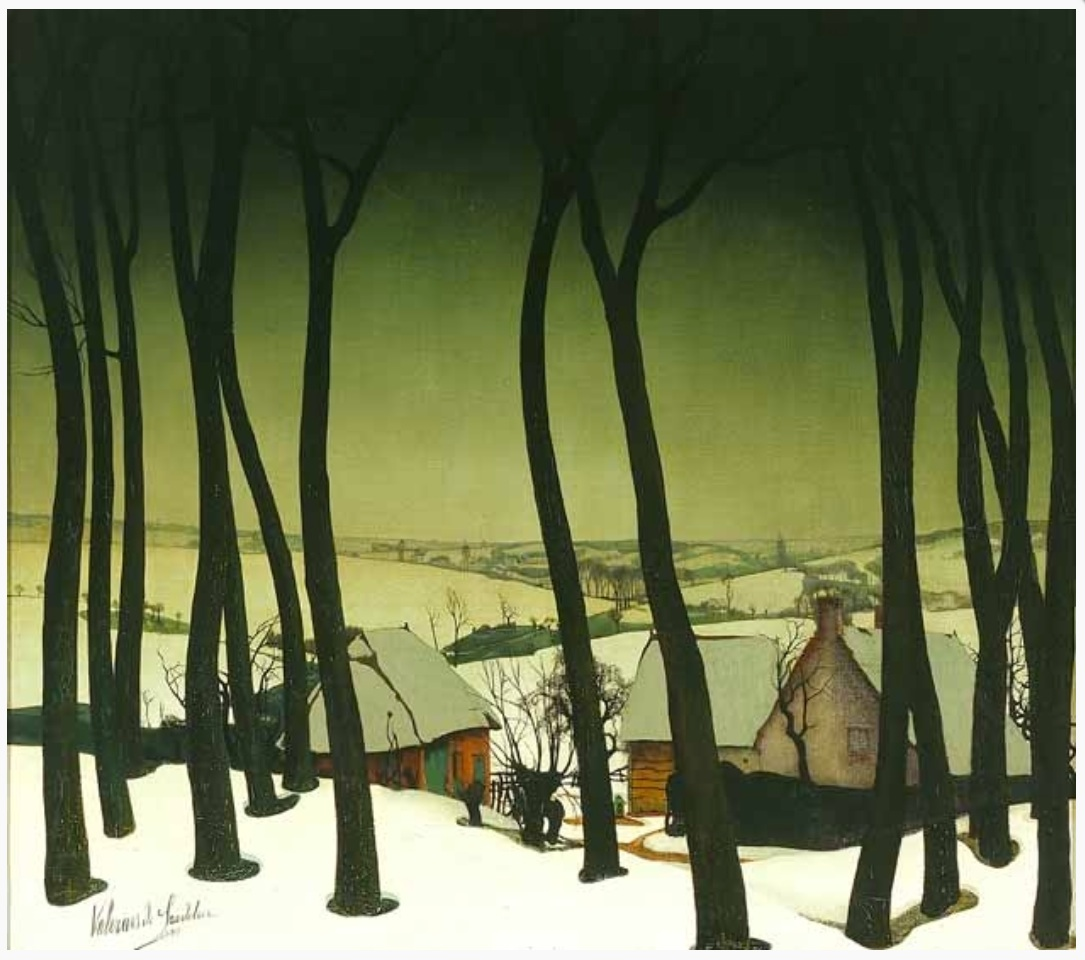
Winter in Flanders

In 1898 de Saedeleer moved back to Sint-Martens-Latem. There he formed part of the first artist colony of the village, together with Gustave van de Woestijne (the brother of Karel van de Woestijne) and George Minne. This group of artists were later referred to as the first School of Latem. The first School of Latem comprised mainly artists who had moved to the countryside in search of a close contact with the soil, to discover a primitive world untainted by modern civilization. There they hoped to find values such as integrity, spontaneity and simplicity. In their quest for that purity they re-examined the art of the old masters. They were influenced by the symbolism that sought to imbue reality with values. They were also inspired by a Christian worldview bordering on the mystical. The painters moved away from the then popular luminism of Emile Claus and his followers and turned towards a more sombre, sober palet, with influences of late Medieval Flemish painting. Around 1905 other artists would move to Sint-Martens-Latem. These artists, the most notable of whom included Constant Permeke, Albert Servaes and Gustave de Smet, are referred to as the second School of Latem. They started out as impressionists but would develop towards an expressionist idiom in reaction to their experiences in World War I.

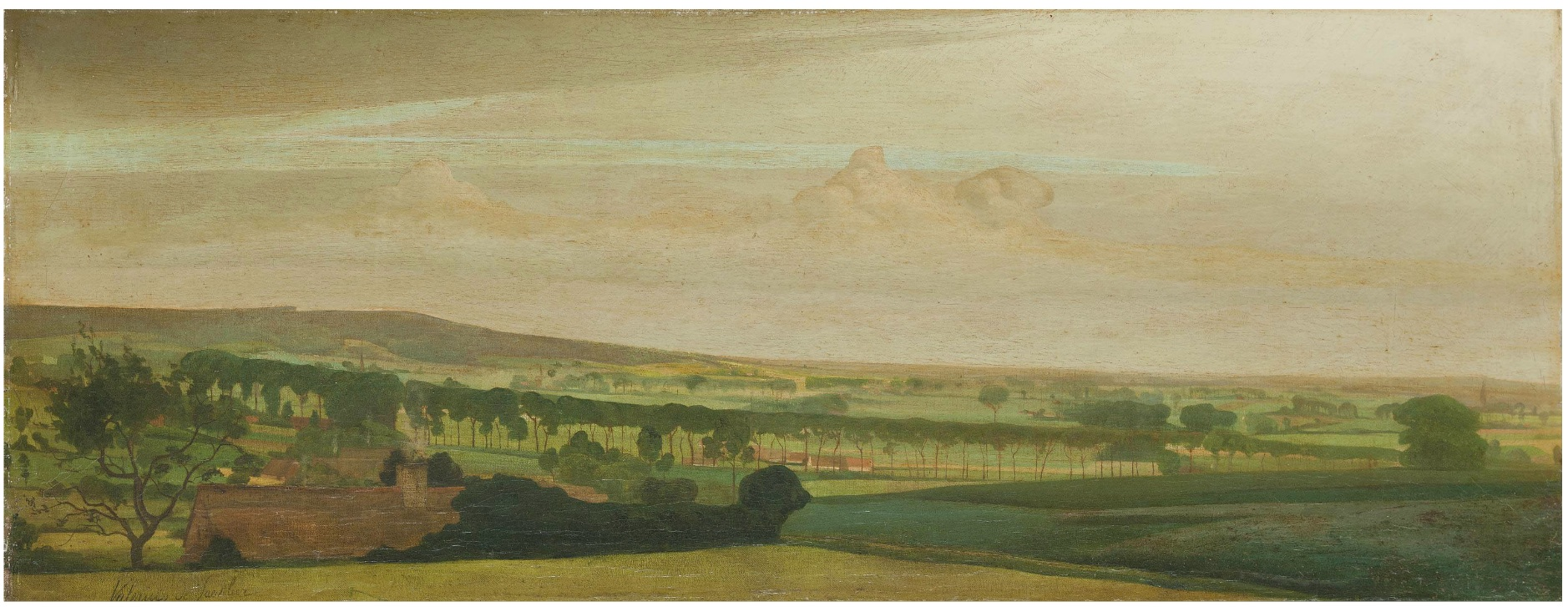
A panoramic view of Tiegem

Despite the success of a first exhibition in 1901 in Aalst, de Saedeleer struggled to live solely from his art and was forced to raise poultry for a living. The next year he visited the Exposition des primitifs flamands à Bruges, which left a lasting impression and influence on his work. In 1903, he exhibited his landscapes at the Salon in Paris, where he was influenced by the works of Émile-René Ménard. The same year he converted to Christianity. From 1904 to 1905 onwards, de Saedeleer found his own style. His work started to show a synthetic, purified vision. His landscapes no longer referenced time or space. He represented the still nature in a composed landscape which was almost always limited by a low horizon. The surface of his canvases was smoothed and he used a soft harmony of colours. The landscapes of this time have a sublime, almost unreal sense of space. In these works the artist was clearly engaged in a symbolistic search for the soul of the landscape, likely under the influence of his conversion to Christianity. He often painted winter landscapes.

De Saedeleer exhibited at the 1904 exhibitions of the Berlin, Munich and Vienna Secession and a few exhibitions in Belgium. He started getting attention in the media and collectors started buying his work. By 1907, he had become the most successful of the painters from Latem. He was particularly well received in the German speaking countries, where the influence of Eugène Laermans on his work was noted. He exhibited at the Salon in Ghent in 1906. In 1907, he had an exhibition in Ghent together with Maurits Sys and Gustave van de Woestijne.

=== Later years ===
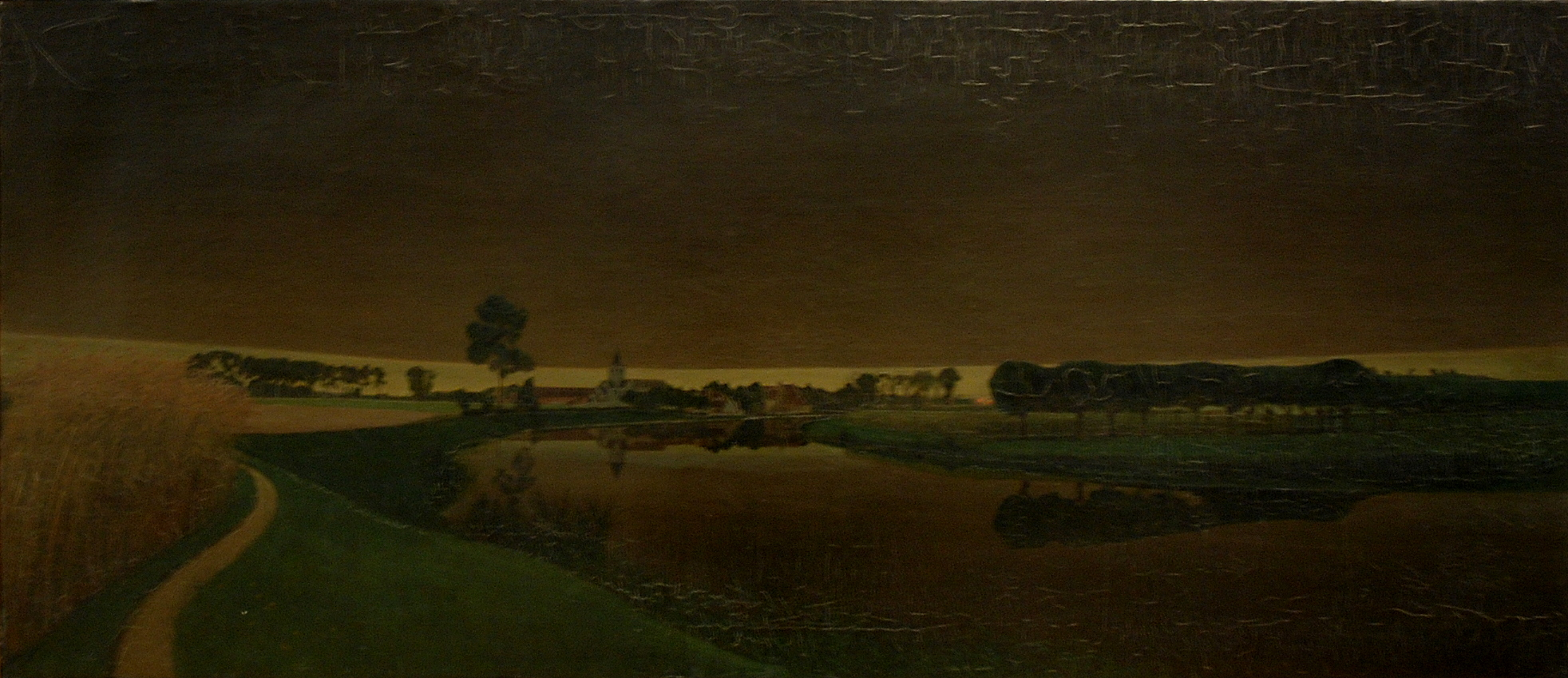
Thunderstorm over Sint-Martens-Latem

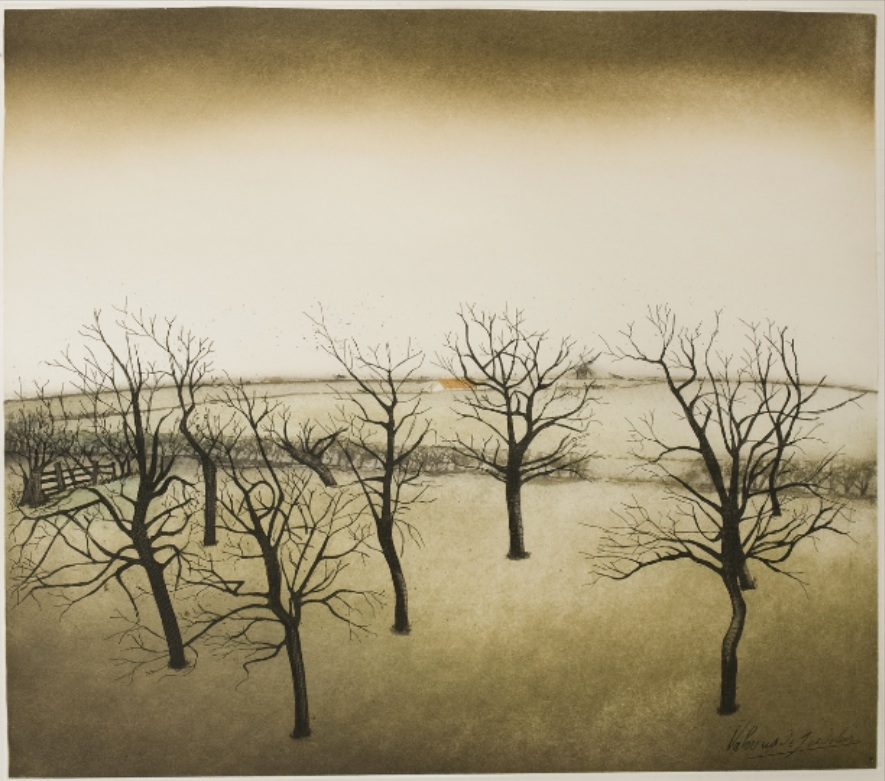
Orchard in winter

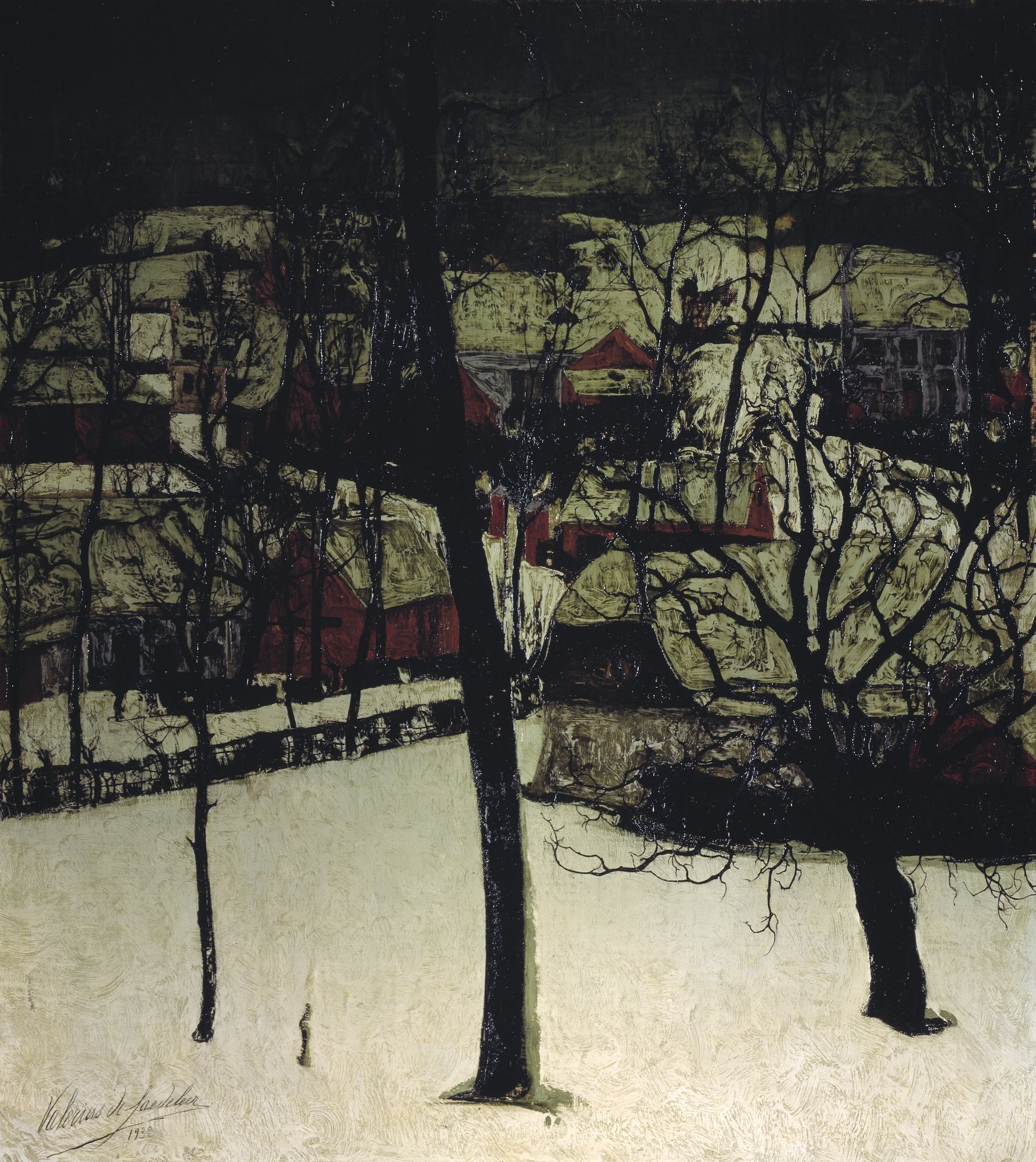
A hamlet under the snow

In 1908 he moved to Tiegem. The move to this more hilly area of Flanders was reflected in his landscapes. The mostly flat views of the Leie landscapes changed to more hilly landscapes. He remained successful, and in 1909 the Museums of Fine Arts of Ghent and Aalst acquired some of his works. In 1911 the Belgian royal family bought his Smidse in de Winter (Smithy in Winter), a snow landscape. He later exhibited at the "Pour l'Art" exhibitions in 1912 and 1914, and was one of the co-founders of "La Jeune Peinture Belge" in 1924. In 1913 his old friend from Latem, Gustave van de Woestijne, joined him in Tiegem.

From 1914 de Saedeleer and his family lived in Wales as refugees from the First World War. Together with his family and the family of his friend George Minne he lived a number of years in Cwmystwyth. Gustave van de Woestijne and George Minne and their families also resided in Wales during the war. The family de Saedeleer and other Belgian artists were brought to Wales by David, Gwendoline and Margaret Davies. The two Davies sisters were best known for putting together one of the great British art collections of the 20th century. The initiative of the Davies family in inviting Belgian artists to Wales was prompted by their expectation that these artists would be able to inject local cultural life with their expertise. De Saedeleer's daughters studied weaving, binding and tapestry at Aberystwyth. The second daughter Elisabeth became acquainted with William Morris' daughter Mary from whom she learned tapestry weaving. The family became so accomplished at weaving that they even started giving courses in the craft themselves. De Saedeleer may have undertaken some conservation work on items from the Aberystwyth University Collection. He also exhibited his paintings of local views in the university's Alexandra Hall and was able to earn a living from his art.

De Saedeleer remained in Wales until 1920, when he moved to Etikhove. In 1933 he became an honorary citizen of the city of Aalst. In 1937 he moved to Leupegem. The work of de Saedeleer became gradually more decorative and he developed a luxuriant and whimsical calligraphy. His compositions often included a row of trees in the foreground, a Japanese-style effect with which he had already experimented before the war. This device is clear in the composition Winter in Flanders. He was also an accomplished colourist.

== Honours ==
- 1924 : Officer in the Order of the Crown.

== Influence ==
The work of de Saedeleer was influential on Belgian landscape painters of the next generation such as Albert Claeys and Albert Saverys whose work referenced de Saedeleer and his inspiration, Pieter Brueghel the Elder.

In recent years the work of the artist has been the subject of retrospective exhibitions such as those held in Aalst in 1967, in Oudenaarde in 1998, again in Aalst in 2000, and in Deinze in 2006.
