= Margaret Davies =

Welsh art collector

Margaret and Gwendoline Davies, National Museum of Wales

Margaret Sidney Davies (14 December 1884 – 13 March 1963), was a Welsh art collector and patron of the arts. With her sister Gwendoline, she bequeathed a total of 260 works, particularly strong in Impressionist and 20th-century art, which formed the basis of the present-day National Museum Wales' international collection. The sisters started the Gregynog Press in 1922 and the Gregynog Music Festival in 1933.

== Early life and education ==
Like her sister Gwen, Margaret was born at Llandinam and educated at Highfield School in Hendon. They and their brother David Davies, 1st Baron Davies, were the children of Edward Davies, the only son of David Davies Llandinam, an industrialist and philanthropist.

== Patron of the arts ==
An amateur painter, Margaret shared Gwen's passion for collecting works by the Impressionists and other contemporary artists. She started the collection in 1906 with her purchase of a painting by Hercules Brabazon Brabazon. By 1913, the two sisters had accumulated enough paintings to host an exhibition at Cardiff City Hall.

During the First World War, the Davies sisters worked as volunteers for the French Red Cross, as they had already travelled extensively in France. They offered asylum in Wales during the war to the Belgian artists George Minne, Valerius de Saedeleer, Elisabeth de Saedeleer and Gustave van de Woestijne.

In the early 1920s, they moved into Gregynog Hall at Newtown, Montgomeryshire. In 1922, they founded the Gregynog Press, publishing fine limited editions of works in English and Welsh.

From 1933 to 1938, they sponsored the Gregynog Music Festival at their estate, an annual 3–4-day affair directed by Henry Walford Davies that included poetry readings. The festivals played host to important composers and other musical figures of the period, including Ralph Vaughan Williams, Edward Elgar, Gustav Holst, "the conductor Adrian Boult, and the poet Lascelles Abercrombie; and performers including Jelly d'Arányi and the Rothschild Quartet."

The festival ended during the build-up to the Second World War. It was revived during 1955–1961 by the composer Ian Parrott, Gregynog Professor of Music at Aberystwyth for more than 30 years. The festival was revived again in 1988 by the tenor Anthony Rolfe Johnson. Since 2006, it has been directed by the music historian and broadcaster, Rhian Davies.

In 1960, some years after her sister's death in 1951, Margaret Davies donated Gregynog to the University of Wales for use as an arts centre. Margaret died in London, and her ashes were buried along with her sister's at their birthplace of Llandinam.

They bequeathed their collection of paintings and sculptures, which Margaret had expanded after Gwen's death, to the National Museum of Wales. The total of 260 works of painting and sculpture formed the nucleus of its art collection, particularly for international art. It has been called "one of the great British art collections of the 20th century". Among these were seven oil paintings that had been bought as J. M. W. Turners (including The Beacon Light). Three of these were subsequently judged to be fake and withdrawn from display. These works were re-examined by the BBC TV programme, Fake or Fortune where they were reinstated as genuine Turners. All seven paintings will now be exhibited together.

In 1967, The Davies Memorial Gallery was built in Newtown, Powys, with a legacy left by the Davies sisters. More recently, in 2003, after major redevelopment and merging with "Oriel 31", the Gallery re-opened as Oriel Davies Gallery, named in honour of the sisters.

== Legacy and honours ==
- 1960, Gregynog donated to the University of Wales as an arts centre.
- 1953 and 1961, bequeathed collections of total of 260 works to the National Museum Wales.
- 1967, the Davies Memorial Gallery built in Newtown, Powys; now known as Oriel Davies Gallery.
- 1988, revival of Gregynog Festival.

== Sources ==
- Hughes, Glyn Tegai. "Davies, Margaret Sidney". Dictionary of Welsh Biography. National Library of Wales.
