= Tregynon =

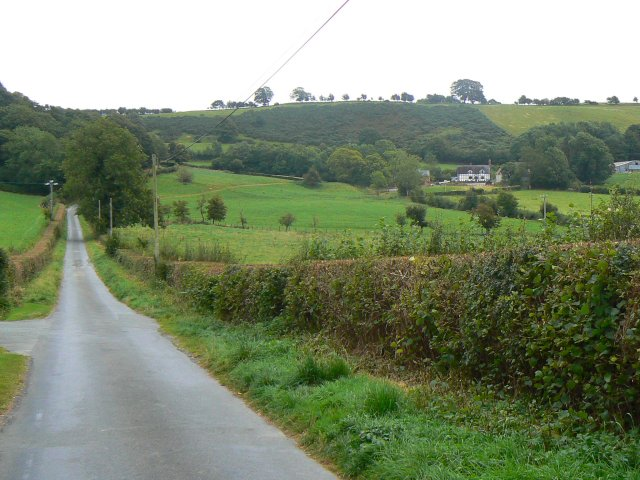

- Location within Powys
- Population: 892 (2011)
- OS grid reference: SO097986
- Community: Tregynon
- Principal area: Powys
- Preserved county: Powys
- Country: Wales
- Sovereign state: United Kingdom
- Post town: NEWTOWN
- Postcode district: SY16
- Dialling code: 01686
- Police: Dyfed-Powys
- Fire: Mid and West Wales
- Ambulance: Welsh
- UK Parliament: Montgomeryshire and Glyndŵr
- Senedd Cymru – Welsh Parliament: Montgomeryshire
- List of places UK Wales Powys 52.5778°N 3.3331°W Community map: Map of the community

Tregynon is a small village and community in Montgomeryshire, Powys, Wales, to the north of Newtown and south west of Welshpool. The population of the community was 892 at the 2011 Census. It rests on the B4389 road which runs from Bettws Cedewain to New Mills. The country house Gregynog is nearby.

== History ==
The village is named from the eponymous 6th-century Saint Cynon and the Parish Church, which is basically pre-Reformation but heavily "restored" in the 19th century, and is built on an oval shaped hillock of pre-historic significance, is named in his honour. In November 2020 it was announced that St Cynon's Church would close due to falling attendances and fundraising difficulties. The church council hoped the building would become a 'Pilgrim Church' open for private prayer and services such as marriage blessings, funerals, as well as concerts and community events, and it remains open to visitors. There is also a Calvinistic Methodist (Presbyterian Church of Wales) Chapel called Bethany.

Thomas Olivers (1725–1799), a Methodist preacher and hymn-writer came from Tregynon.

The nearby country house is Gregynog Hall dates from 1840; in the 19th century it was the seat of the Blayney (Blaenau, originally) Hanbury-Tracy families and became the centre of Welsh cultural life in the 20th century under Miss Margaret and Miss Gwendoline Davies, who had inherited the fortune of their grandfather David Davies of Llandinam.

Although it is commonly thought that they made the village alcohol-free and made the local pub into the Temperance Hotel, it is a fact that the Temperance Hotel existed from at least the 1880s. They used their money and influence to promote their faith by regular Chapel attendance and encouraging this among their tenants and employees and paying for the erection of the Manse near to the Bethany Chapel and installing its organ. They gave refuge to wounded soldiers in both World Wars and established a printing press and local choir. They left their home to the University of Wales as a cultural, educational and retreat centre.

Tregynon boasted a number of prolific local families in the agricultural and local industrial 19th and 20th centuries, including the Williams, Stephens, Thomas and Corfield "clans". The use of the Welsh language, which had declined during the 19th century, has increased over recent decades due to the position of the local Primary School for the surrounding area in the village of Tregynon and the policy of the local authority to make bilingualism its aim. The village was touched by the last Welsh Revival of 1904-05 and many of the children converted at the time kept the memory alive until the end of the century. The Bethany Chapel was predominantly English in worship and instruction but there were some Welsh classes and the lively singing in both languages echoed out to the neighbouring Boncyn y Beddau hill ["The Bonkin" in English]. The Brook, known as the Bechan in Welsh, is an eventual tributary of the Severn and provided power for the local Sawmill, now owned by Coed Cymru.

The latter decades of the twentieth century saw an expansion of the population of the village with many houses and bungalows being built in the low-lying fields and being given Welsh names (e.g."Tan-yr-Eglyws"). The presence of the local primary school, Ysgol Rhiw Bechan, for the area as well as the Village Community Hall are attractions to outsiders to settle. The centre of the village retains its old charm with the Rectory, Church House, old School displaying traditional mid Wales half timber framed black and white dwellings and innovative early use of concrete – the latter also found on the outskirts of the village in a pair of cottages. One of oldest buildings is the Old School House, also known as "Tithe Barn", now divided into two homes, located alongside the remains of a medieval fort with earthworks near the Bechan brook. Some of the straighter local roads are likely to be of Roman origin - leading to Llanfair Caereinion in particular.

Further from the centre of the village are a number of Farms including Ty'n y Bryn, Neuadd Llwyd, Cefn Llydan, etc.
