= Gregynog Hall =

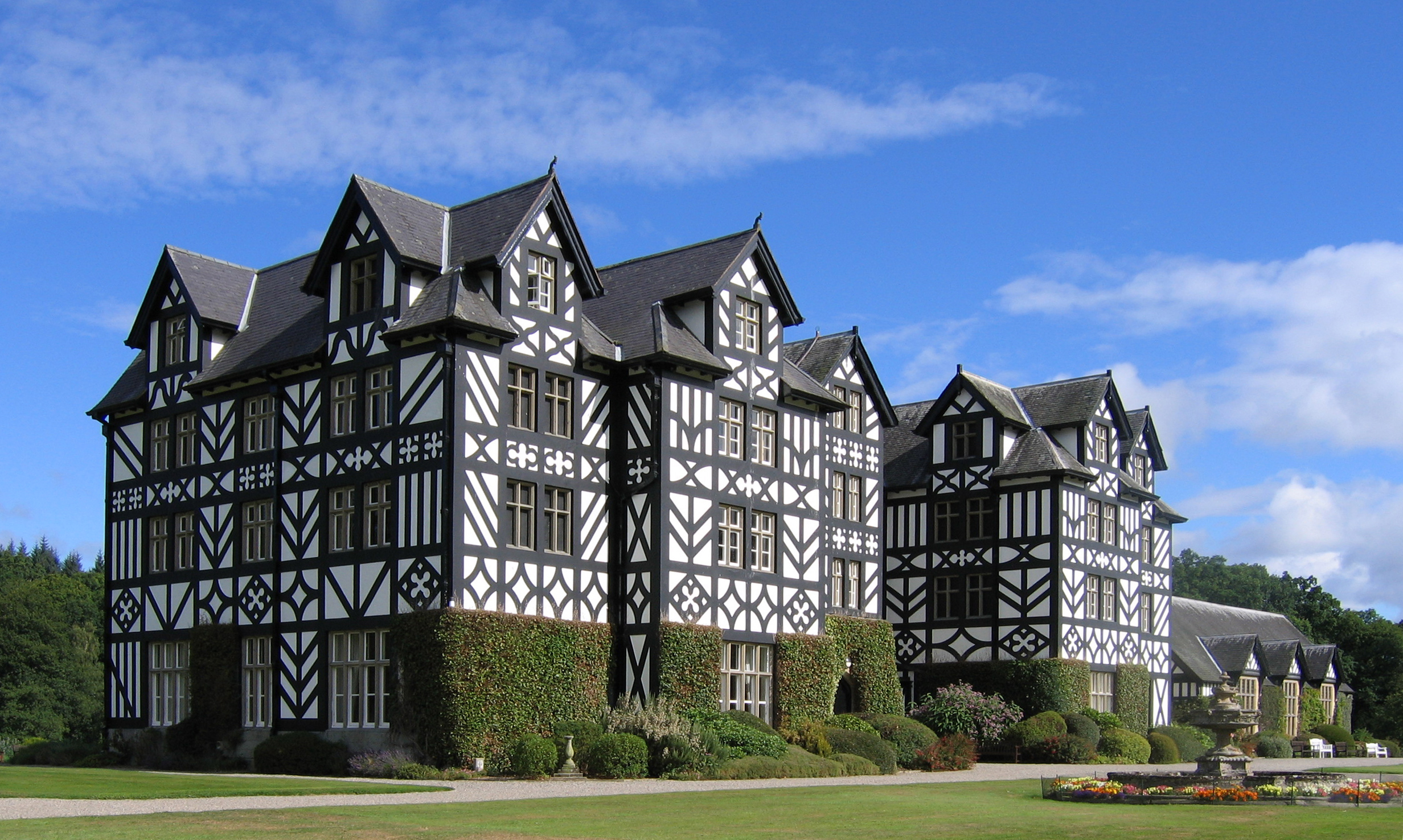
- Gregynog (pronounced "greh-gun-og")

- Location within Wales

General information
- Location: Tregynon, Tregynon, Wales
- Coordinates: 52°34′07″N 03°21′14″W
- Elevation: 200m

Gregynog (Welsh pronunciation: [ɡrɛˈɡənɔɡ]) is a large country mansion in the village of Tregynon, 4 miles (6.4 km) northwest of Newtown in the old county of Montgomeryshire, now Powys in mid Wales. There has been a settlement on the site since the twelfth century. From the fifteenth to the nineteenth century it was the home of the Blayney and Hanbury-Tracy families. In 1960 it was transferred to the University of Wales as a conference and study centre by Margaret Davies, granddaughter of the nineteenth century industrial magnate and philanthropist, David Davies 'Top Sawyer' of Llandinam.

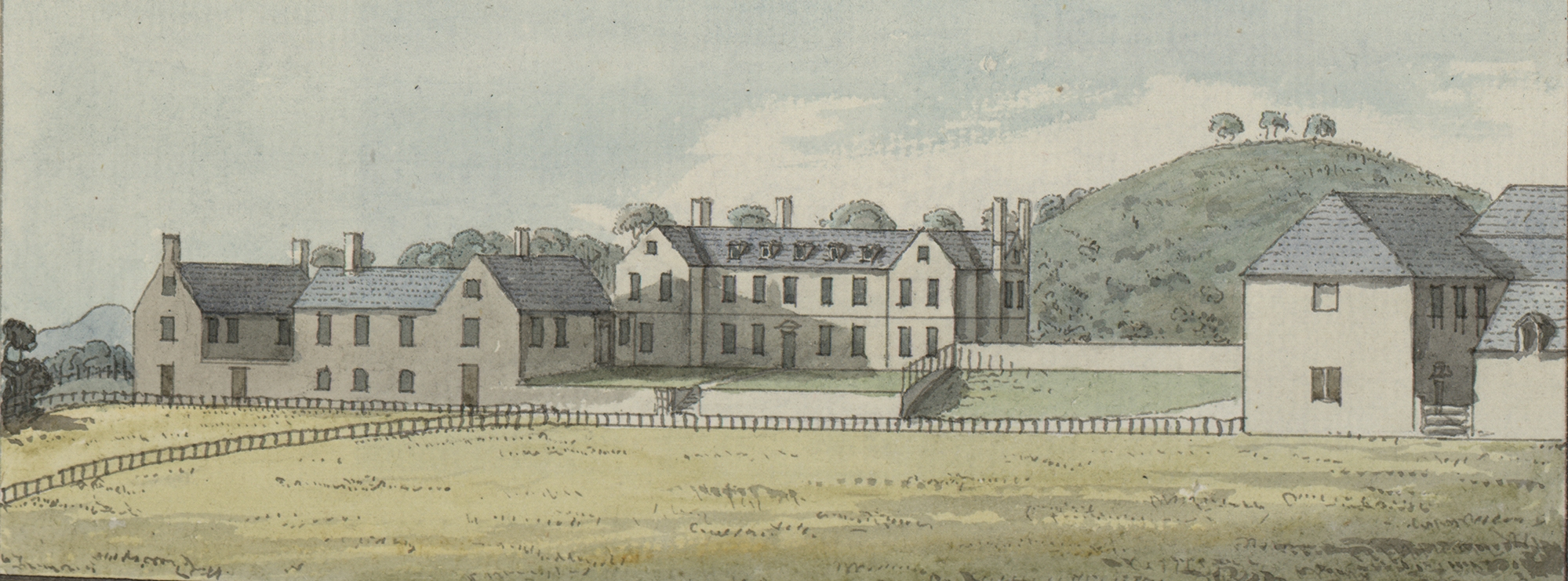
Grygynnog house, before it was rebuilt in the 1840s

The gardens and park surrounding the house are listed at Grade I on the Cadw/ICOMOS Register of Parks and Gardens of Special Historic Interest in Wales.

== History ==
The original mansion was rebuilt in the 1840s by Charles Hanbury-Tracy, 1st Baron Sudeley. Its concrete cladding, designed to replicate the black-and-white timber-framed architecture of Montgomeryshire farmhouses, is among the earliest examples of concrete use in building in the modern era. The Sudeleys were also pioneers of the use of concrete in the building of new cottages and farmhouses on the Gregynog estate, and many Cadw-listed examples can still be seen in Tregynon and the surrounding countryside. At its largest, the Gregynog estate was over 18,000 acres (73 km^{2}) in extent, but the estate was broken up in 1913, leaving the mansion with 750 acres (3.0 km^{2}) of farms, woodlands and formal gardens. The sunken garden and arboretum are of particular note. The gardens and park are listed at Grade I on the Cadw/ICOMOS Register of Parks and Gardens of Special Historic Interest in Wales.

== Gregynog and the Davies sisters ==
Gregynog Hall built in its present form in the 1840s

Gregynog was bought by Margaret and her elder sister Gwendoline Davies in 1920 with the intention of establishing a centre of excellence for the arts, crafts and music which would enrich the lives of the people of Wales in the aftermath of World War One. It became famous for music, fine printing and for the sisters' art collections which they bequeathed to the nation. These can now be seen in the Davies Galleries of the National Museum of Wales, Cardiff.

Theirs was one of the most important British collections of French Impressionist and Post-Impressionist painting acquired before 1920. Their advisor Hugh Blaker was the younger brother of their governess Jane Blaker. The French collection was only one aspect of their interests – it hung at Gregynog alongside Old Masters, prints by Dürer, Rembrandt and Whistler, Chinese and Islamic ceramics, contemporary hand-made furniture commissioned by the sisters, Welsh vernacular furniture as well as contemporary ceramics and crafts. Seen as a whole, the sisters' collections are a tribute to the multiplicity and catholicism of their tastes.

The Gregynog Music Festival, Wales's oldest surviving classical music festival, was established in 1933 by the Davies sisters, with the advice of their friend and advisor, Sir Henry Walford Davies (later Master of the King's Music). Many famous names are associated with the Gregynog Festivals, including Gustav Holst, Ralph Vaughan Williams, Edward Elgar and Sir Adrian Boult. The Festival is still held at Gregynog every June. In more recent years, leading international artistes have performed at Gregynog, including Benjamin Britten and Peter Pears. The sisters also established the Gregynog Press, which still exists under the name of Gwasg Gregynog, and is famous for its limited edition hand-printed books with fine bindings and exquisite wood-engraved illustrations.

Gregynog is also home to the annual Young Musicians Competition which attracts participants from all over Wales and beyond.

Photos taken in the 1900s by Percy Benzie Abery

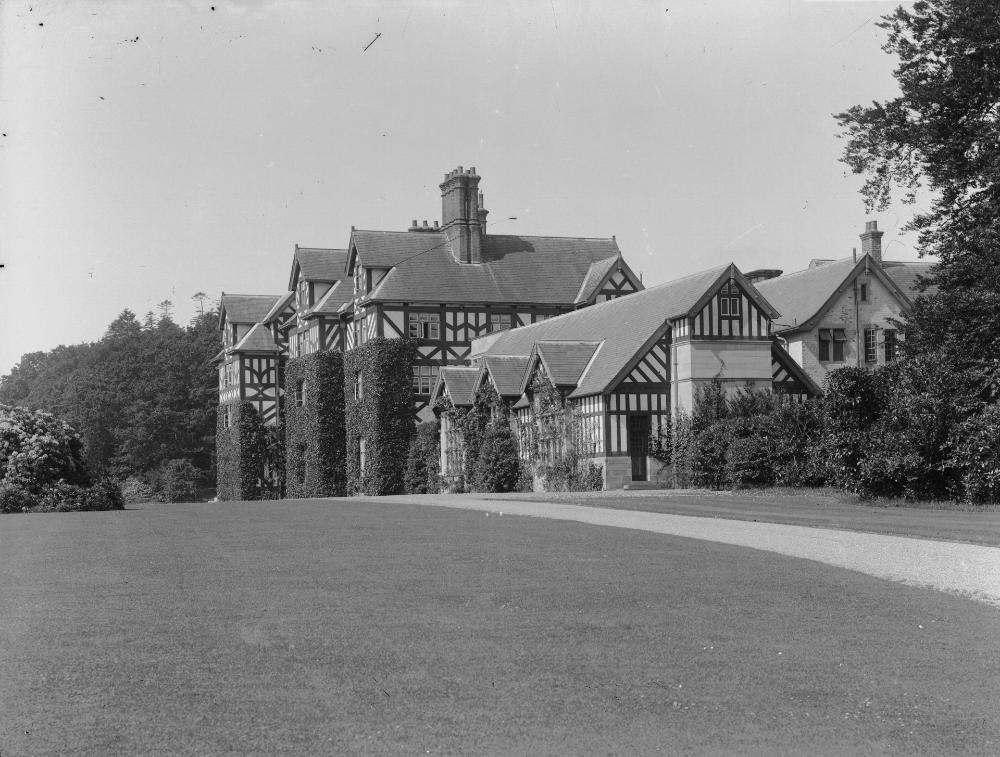

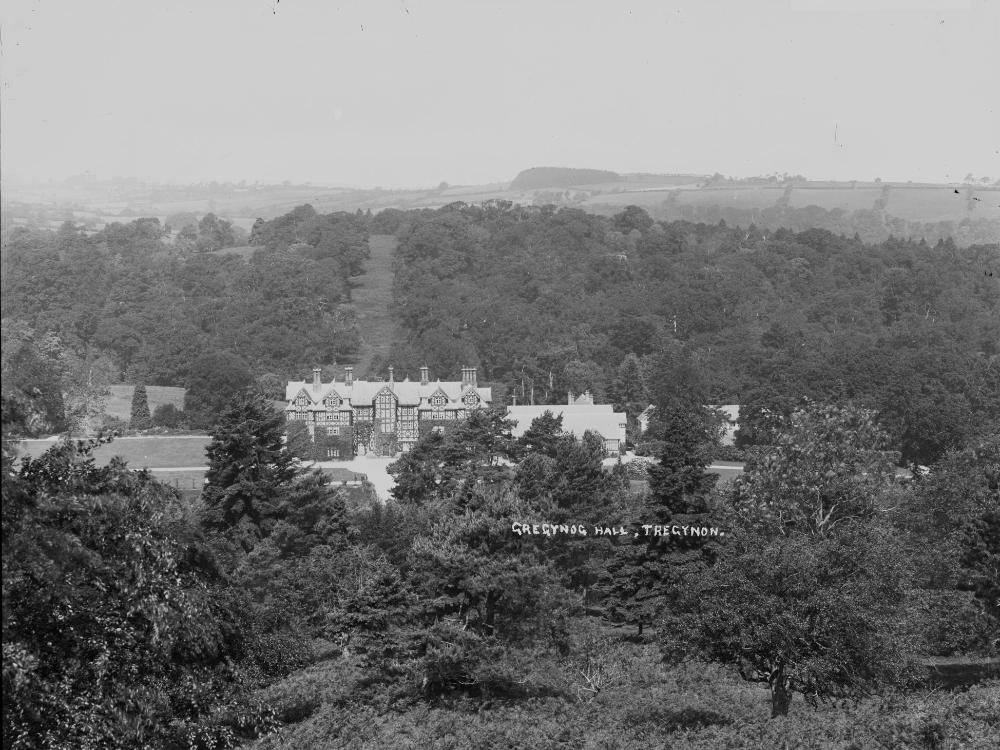

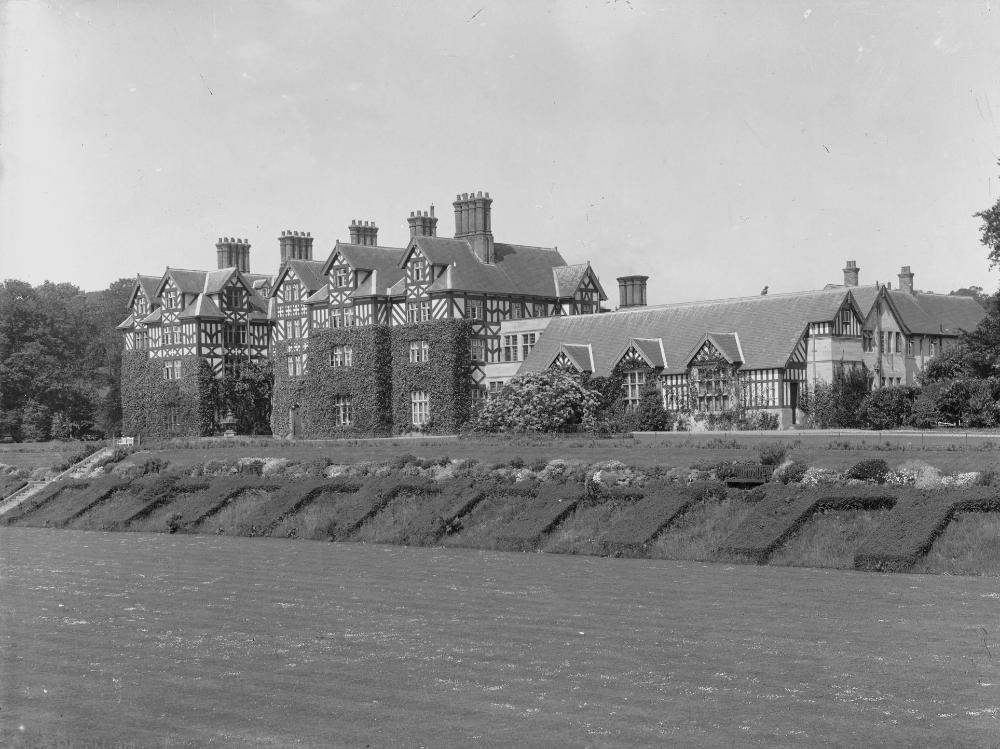

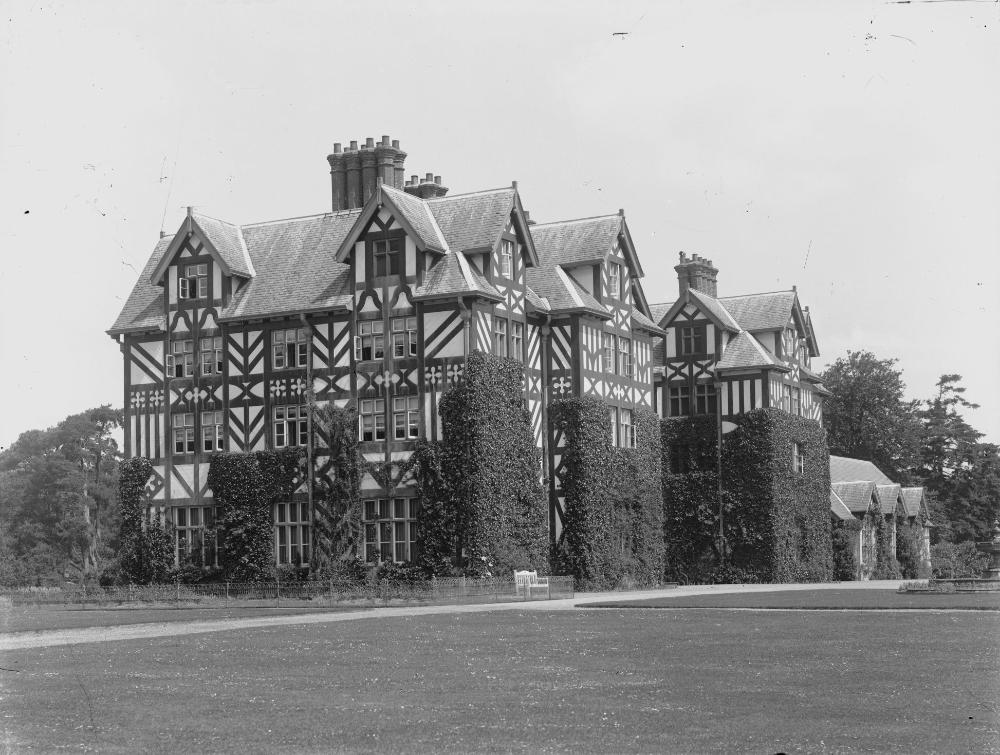

== Gregynog today ==
Since Margaret Davies's gift of Gregynog to the University of Wales in 1960, the hall has hosted conferences, seminars and summer schools from every academic discipline. The growing understanding of the ecological importance of the grounds, especially the ancient woodlands, has led to their designation in March 2013 as a National Nature Reserve. The training apiary of the Montgomeryshire Beekeepers Association is also situated in the Gregynog grounds.

The "Gregynog Statistical Conference" has been held annually over Easter at Gregynog Hall since 1965. Established by Dennis Lindley during his tenure at Aberystwyth, Gregynog Hall has welcomed a number of internationally renowned statisticians, some of which include Henry Daniels, David Cox, Peter Bickel, David Kendall, George Barnard, John Nelder, Brad Efron, Adrian Smith, Peter Donnelly, David Spiegelhalter and Julian Besag.

The Hall continues to operate as an historic house conference centre and now wedding venue, offering tourist accommodation for visitors to the gardens and grounds. Welsh fine art auctioneers Rogers Jones & Co opened their permanent regional office at the site in 2024 and have since held Welsh art auctions at the Music Room. Following institutional changes within the University of Wales the future of Gregynog as a national centre for excellence in the arts, education and culture of Wales is soon to be protected by its establishment as an independent charitable trust.

== The Great Wood and Gregynog Oak ==
The Grounds are also home to The Great Wood, an ancient oak forest which is part of the National Forest for Wales and a Site of Special Scientific Interest. The forest is home to many very large and ancient trees, most notably the famous Gregynog Oak which is at least five hundred years old and measures nine meters in width.

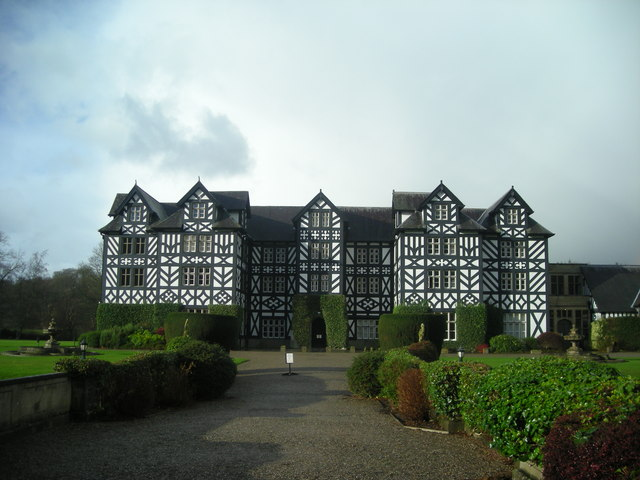
Gregynog Hall

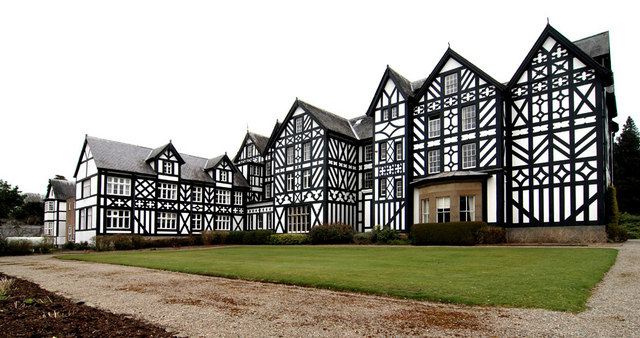
Gregynog Hall

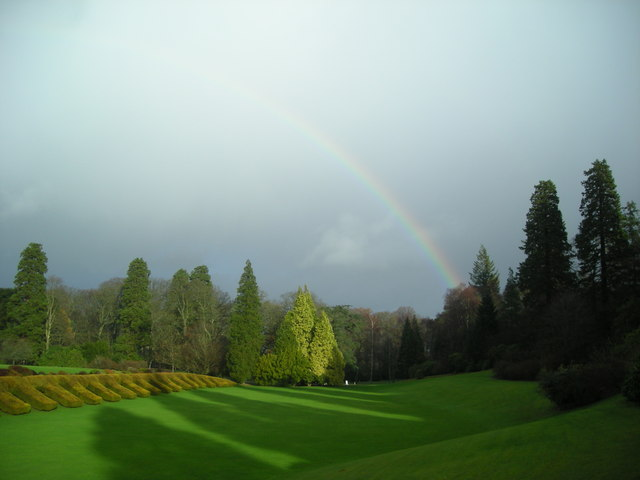
Gregynog Hall

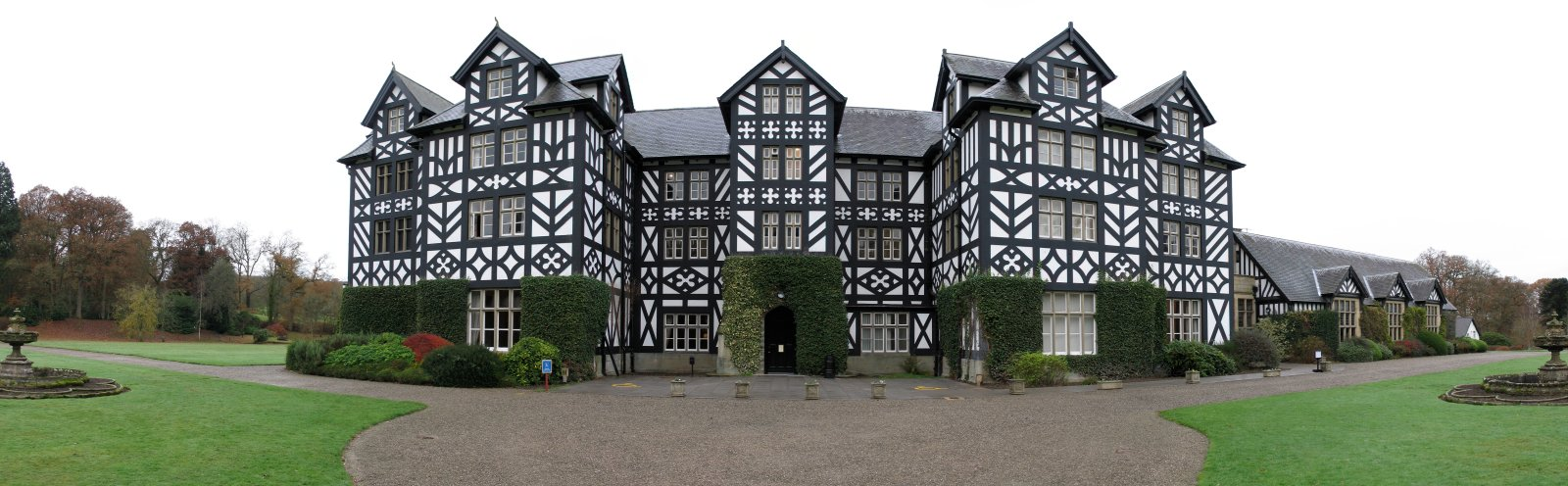
Gregynog House

== See also ==
- List of gardens in Wales
