= Gwendoline Davies =

Welsh philanthropist (1882–1951)

Margaret and Gwendoline Davies, 1910, National Museum of Wales

Gwendoline Elizabeth Davies, CH (11 February 1882 – 3 July 1951) was a Welsh philanthropist and patron of the arts who, with her sister Margaret, is recognised as the most influential collector of Impressionist and 20th-century art in Wales. She and her sister were independently wealthy, their fortune inherited from the businesses created by their grandfather, the industrialist David Davies. Davies and her sister created one of the most important private collections of art in Britain and donated their total of 260 works to what is now the National Museum Wales in the mid-20th century.

== Early life and education ==
Gwendoline Davies was born at Llandinam, daughter of Edward Davies and his wife Mary, who was the daughter of Evan Jones, a Calvinistic Methodist minister. Edward was the only son of the industrialist and philanthropist David Davies. Gwendoline's brother David Davies, 1st Baron Davies, was elevated to the Peerage in 1932 and her sister was Margaret. Both girls were educated at Highfield School in Hendon.

== Arts patronage ==
=== Art collection ===
In 1908 while travelling in Europe, the sisters began to collect art. In particular, they purchased many works by the Impressionists and post-Impressionists, although they also acquired holdings of 20th-century modern artists, such as Josef Herman, Oskar Kokoschka, Augustus John, Stanley Spencer, Frank Brangwyn, and Eric Gill. Hugh Blaker, art collector who was curator of the Holburne Museum from 1905 – 1913 was an adviser to the Davies sisters and assisted in securing their vast art collection.

Gwendoline and Margaret Davies bought the mansion of Gregynog just after the First World War, following long discussions with their lifelong friend Thomas Jones, and set up an arts centre there. In 1923 the sisters launched the Gregynog Press, printing fine limited editions in both English and Welsh. Jones was chairman of the press throughout its existence.

=== Music patronage – Gregynog Music Festival ===
Whereas art was Margaret's passion, Gwen was a talented amateur musician. From 1933 to 1938, they sponsored the Gregynog Music Festival at their estate, a 3–4-day affair that included poetry readings. The festivals played host to important composers and other musical figures of the period, including Ralph Vaughan Williams, Edward Elgar, Gustav Holst, "the conductor Adrian Boult, and the poet Lascelles Abercrombie; and performers including Jelly d'Arányi and the Rothschild Quartet."

The sisters ended the festival during the build-up to the Second World War. It was revived during 1955–1961 by Ian Parrott, who was Gregynog Professor of Music at Aberystwyth for more than 30 years. The festival was revived again in 1988 by the tenor Anthony Rolfe Johnson. It continues under Rhian Davies's direction.

== Later life ==
Neither of the sisters married. Gwen died in Oxford. Her ashes were buried at her birthplace of Llandinam, as were her sister's after her death in 1963.

== Art legacy ==
In 1953 and 1961, the Davies sisters' collection of 260 works was bequeathed to the National Museum of Wales, forming the nucleus in the mid-20th century of its international art collection and greatly expanding its range. It has been called "one of the great British art collections of the 20th century."

In 1967, the Davies Memorial Gallery was purpose-built in Newtown, Powys with a legacy left by the Davies sisters. In January 2003, after major refurbishment, the Gallery re-opened as Oriel Davies Gallery in recognition of the sisters.

=== Turners ===
Among the works donated to the museum are seven oil paintings that were bought as J. M. W. Turners. Three of these, The Beacon Light, Margate Jetty and Off Margate, were subsequently judged to be fake, and were withdrawn from display. These works were re-examined for the BBC TV programme Fake or Fortune?, and in an episode broadcast in 2012 they were reinstated as genuine Turners. All seven paintings will now be exhibited together.

== Honours ==
- 1937: appointed a Member of the Order of the Companions of Honour

== Notes ==
Gwendoline Elizabeth Davies should not be confused with the Hon. Gwendoline Rita Jean Davies (born 1929), the daughter of her brother, David Davies, 1st Baron Davies.

== Sources ==
- "Gwendoline Davies", Welsh Biography Online
- BBC
