= List of Cyfraith Hywel manuscripts =

This page lists all manuscripts known to contain versions of the Cyfraith Hywel first codified by Hywel Dda in the mid 10th century.

== The manuscripts ==
=== Iorwerth redaction ===
- Black Book of Chirk Peniarth 29
- BL Cotton Titus D II
- BL Cotton Caligula A III
- Peniarth 32 Llyfr Teg (Welsh)
- BL Add MS 14931
- Peniarth 35; the first 75 folios of Peniarth 35 seem to be a medieval attempt to reconstruct the lost Book of Cynog
- Peniarth 40
- Peniarth 39

=== Blegywryd redaction ===
- Peniarth 38
- Jesus College Oxford, MS LVII
- BL Cotton Titus D IX
- Peniarth 33
- Peniarth 36B
- Peniarth 36A
- Peniarth 259A
- Wynnstay 36
- Peniarth 31
- BL Add MS 22356
- BL Harley MS 958
- Llanstephan 116
- Trinity College Cambridge 1329
- Llanstephan 29
- NLW ms 24029A Boston manuscript
- Peniarth 258

=== Cyfnerth redaction ===
- Bodorgan Manuscript
- Peniarth 37
- BL Harley MS 4353
- BL Cotton Cleopatra A XIV
- BL Cotton Cleopatra B V
- NLW MS 20143A
- Peniarth 259B Pomffred manuscript

=== Latin texts ===
- Peniarth 28
- BL Cotton Vespasian E XI 1
- BL Harley MS 1796
- Rawlinson C 821
- Corpus Christi College, Cambridge 454

=== Others ===
- Peniarth 30 Llyfr Colan (Welsh)
- Peniarth 34
- Peniarth 164
- Peniarth 175
- Peniarth 36C
