= NLW MS 20143A =

Welsh-language manuscript of the 1300s recording Welsh law

Coordinates: 52.4144°N 4.0689°W

NLW MS 20143A is a Welsh-language manuscript of the laws of Hywel Dda dating from the middle of the 14th century. It is one of the few surviving Welsh manuscripts of the period to have a medieval binding, and has been digitised by the National Library of Wales, which acquired the manuscript in 1969. It is one of various surviving Cyfraith Hywel manuscripts.

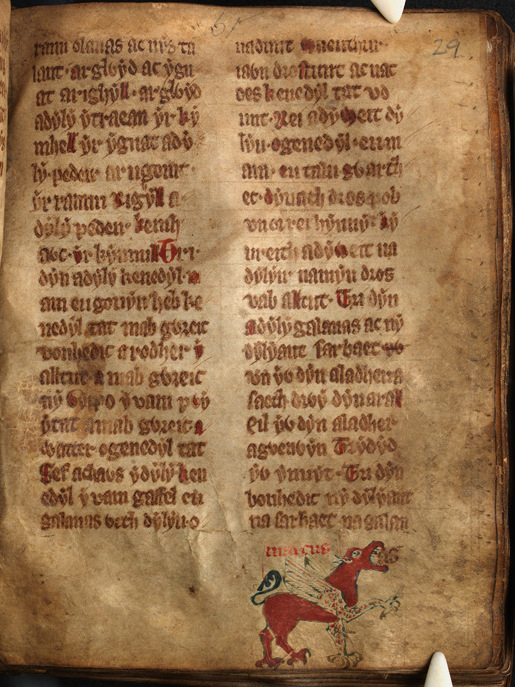
Folio 29r. of the manuscript

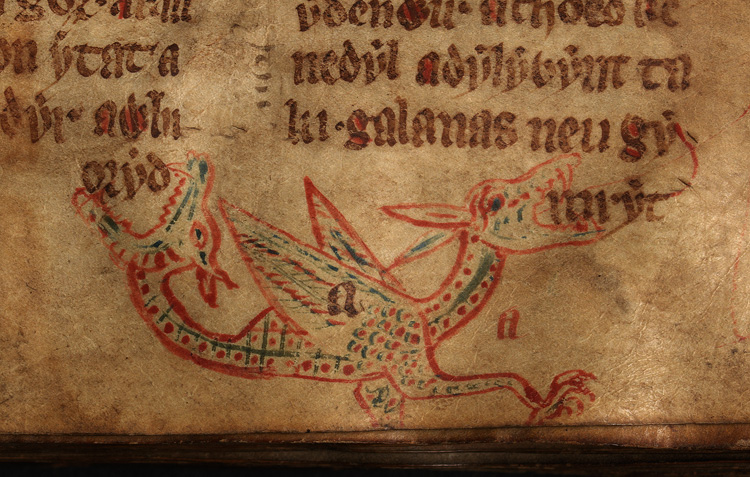
An illustration of a Wyvern, F. 21r.

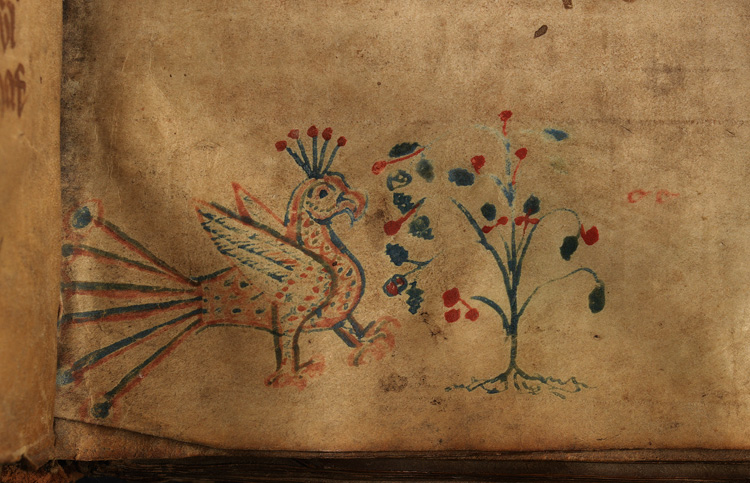
A Peacock, F. 40r.

== Contents ==
The manuscript contains a copy of some of the law that applied in medieval Wales, known as Cyfraith Hywel (the law of Hywel, after the Welsh king Hywel Dda). It includes a copy of the laws of court (the rights and duties of the king and his officers), in the Cyfnerth redaction, and some other legal material. The outer leaves of the manuscript are waste pages of parchment from other manuscript: an extract from a commentary on part of the First Epistle to the Corinthians and parts of the orders of service for marriage and visiting the sick. Two scribes wrote the manuscript together and differences in their handwriting can be seen. Drawings in the margins of the folios include symbols of the four authors of the Gospels (although those of Luke and John are transposed), a crucifixion scene, and beasts and creatures such as a mermaid, dragons, and peacocks. Blue-green and red inks are used for the drawings. Some of the initial letters are also enlarged, coloured and decorated.

== Description ==
The manuscript is written in two columns on leaves of parchment measuring 160 by 130 millimetres (6.3 by 5.1 in). It has 115 folios and flyleaves from other manuscripts, sewn together and held between boards; the manuscript scholar Daniel Huws considers the sewing and boards to be original, noting that "it is one of the few medieval Welsh manuscripts to retain a medieval, probably original, binding structure". Calf was used to recover the boards at some point in the 19th century. The spine bears a 19th-century addition, the Latin words Leges Walliaae MS Saec. 13 ("13th-century Welsh Law Manuscript").

== History ==
Huws considers that the text indicates that the manuscript was written in south Wales in the second half of the 14th century, and that the drawings point towards it being written in a religious setting. Later marginalia suggest, says Huws, that the manuscript thereafter remained in south Wales. The Welsh antiquarian Edward Lhuyd (1660–1709) obtained a copy of the text in 1698, copied for him by his assistant William Jones when working in Dolgellau in north-west Wales, although the home of the manuscript is not recorded. The Welsh clergyman William Conybeare gave it to the Neath Philosophical Society in 1835. It was referred to as "Manuscript Y" by Aneurin Owen in his 1841 work Ancient Laws and Institutes of Wales, a record of surviving Welsh law manuscripts, but from about 1860 onwards it was held in unknown private hands. In 1969, it was acquired by the National Library of Wales, Aberystwyth, and added to the General Manuscript Collection with the reference NLW MS 20143A. It was the first Welsh law manuscript to be digitised by the library.
