= Henry Petrie =

Henry Petrie may refer to:

- Henry Petrie (antiquary) (1768–1842), English antiquary
- Henry W. Petrie (1857–1925), American composer and performer
