= Peniarth 164 =

14th-century Welsh legal manuscript

Esboniadau ar Gyfraith Hywel Dda (Peniarth 164) is a volume of commentaries on the Laws of Hywel Dda from the late fourteenth century that is known as 'siglum H'. The manuscript contains almost 500 triads and some unique material, but a large part of it is illegible because of the oak apples stains conferred on it by John Jones, Gellilyfdy.

Sometime before 1619 'H' was bound in a single volume with another text of the Laws of Hywel Dda, the Black Book of Chirk (Peniarth 29), and remained so until after 1869. Manuscript H includes the transcript of the Black Book of Chirk that was partially copied by John Jones in Llanstephan 121. Llanstephan 121 also includes sections of the Ancient Laws from Peniarth 278, which is transcription of the Black Book of Chirk in the hand of Robert Vaughan.

Peniarth 164 is kept at the National Library of Wales in the Peniarth Manuscripts Collection.
