= Aneurin Owen (antiquarian) =

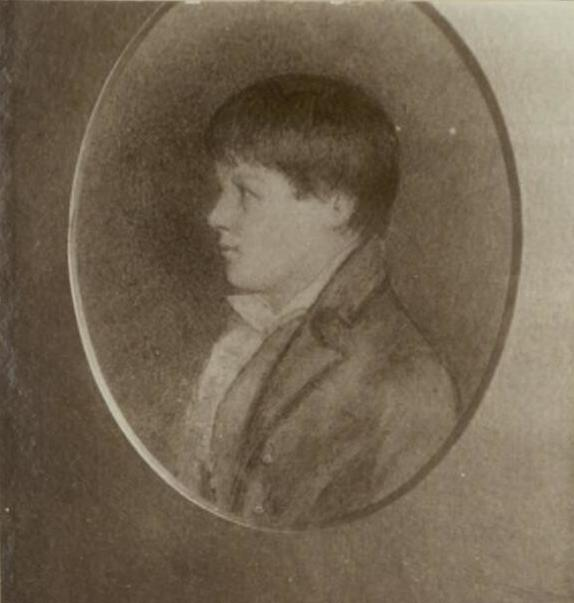
Portrait of Aneurin Owen as a child

Aneurin Owen (23 July 1792 – 17 July 1851) was a Welsh historical scholar.

== Life ==
Aneurin Owen was a son of William Owen by his wife, Sarah Elizabeth. While he was still a child his father took the additional name of Pughe on inheriting some property at Nantglyn in Denbighshire. The family moved there from London. Owen was for a short time at Friars School, Bangor, but was mainly educated by his father.

Aneurin made his home at Tanygyrt, near Nantglyn, and in 1820 married Jane Lloyd, also of Nantglyn. With the passing of the Tithe Commutation Act 1836, he was appointed one of the assistant tithe commissioners for England and Wales. On the death of Colonel Thomas Francis Wade in 1847, he was made an assistant poor-law commissioner, but found the duties too heavy. Later he was appointed, under the Enclosures Act 1815, a commissioner for the inclosure of commonable lands.

Owen was one of a committee of five appointed at the Abergavenny Eisteddfod (1838) to consider the reform of Welsh orthography, and in 1832 won a silver medal at the Beaumaris Eisteddfod for the best Welsh essay on Agriculture (published in the Transactions of the Eisteddfod, 1839, and also in a separate volume).

Owen died on 17 July 1851 at Trosyparc, near Denbigh.

== Works ==
When the government decided in 1822 to publish an edition of the old British historians, the Welsh portion of the work was entrusted to John Humffreys Parry. On Parry's death in 1825 his duties came to Owen, who became the adviser of the Public Record Office on Welsh matters. His work falls mainly under two heads – the publication of the ancient Welsh laws, and the accumulation of material for an edition of the Brut y Tywysogion (Chronicle of the Princes). These tasks were carried on concurrently during the period 1830–40; and in 1841 the Record edition of the laws appeared (in two forms, a large folio and two quarto volumes) under the title Ancient Laws and Institutes of Wales. It distinguished for the first time the three versions (Venedotian, Dimetian, and Gwentian) of the original Law of Hywel.

The edition of the Brut y Tywysogion did not appear in Owen's lifetime. The short portion which ends at 1066 was edited by him for the Monumenta Historica Britannica (1848), but the bulk of his material remained unpublished, and went to the Public Record Office on his death in 1851. When in 1860 the Rolls Series edition of Brut y Tywysogion appeared, under the editorship of John Williams (Ab Ithel), the reviewer in Archaeologia Cambrensis asserted that the text and the translation were the work of Owen, who was not mentioned in the book. In 1863 Owen's transcript and translation of the so-called Gwentian Brut (a spurious Glamorganshire version of the Chronicle), with the introduction he had prepared for the Monumenta, and a letter on the Welsh chronicles to Henry Petrie, were printed as an extra volume by the Cambrian Archaeological Association.

== Notes ==
Attribution

This article incorporates text from a publication now in the public domain: Lee, Sidney, ed. (1895). "Owen, Aneurin". Dictionary of National Biography. Vol. 42. London: Smith, Elder & Co.
