= Rolls Series =

Published collection of British and Irish historical materials

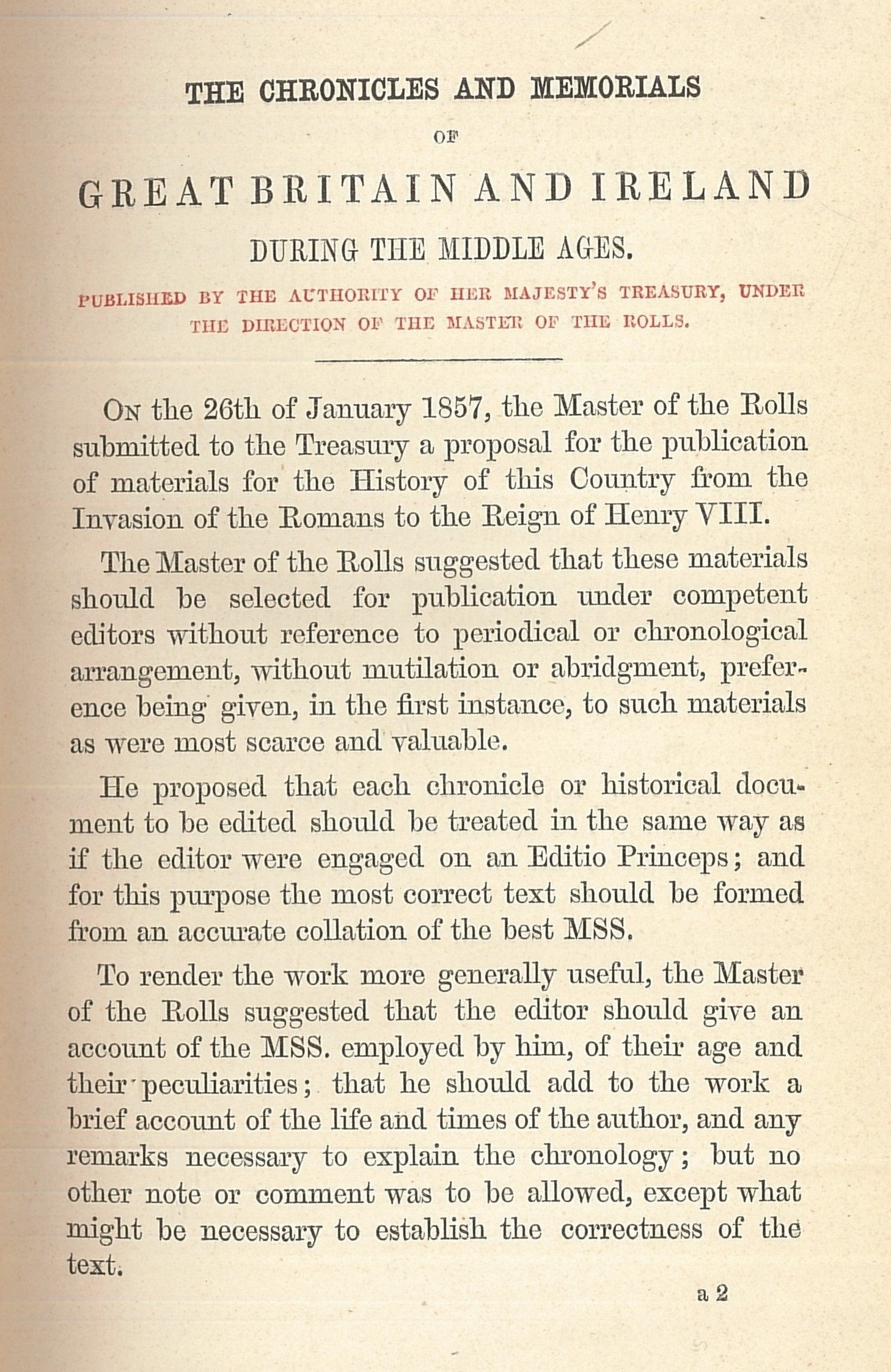
First page of the statement of intent published as a preamble to all Rolls Series volumes, dated December 1857

The Chronicles and Memorials of Great Britain and Ireland during the Middle Ages (Latin: Rerum Britannicarum medii aevi scriptores), widely known as the Rolls Series, is a major collection of British and Irish historical materials and primary sources published as 99 works in 253 volumes between 1858 and 1911. Almost all the great medieval English chronicles were included: most existing editions, published by scholars of the 17th and 18th centuries, were considered to be unsatisfactory. The scope was also extended to include legendary, folklore and hagiographical materials, and archival records and legal tracts.

The series was government-funded, and takes its unofficial name from the fact that its volumes were published "by the authority of Her Majesty's Treasury, under the direction of the Master of the Rolls", who was the official custodian of the records of the Court of Chancery and other courts, and nominal head of the Public Record Office.

== The project ==
The publication of the series was undertaken by the British Government in accordance with a scheme submitted in 1857 by the Master of the Rolls, then Sir John Romilly. A previous undertaking of the same kind, the Monumenta Historica Britannica, had fallen into abeyance after the publication of the first volume (1036 folio pages, London, 1848). The principal editor, Henry Petrie had died, and its form was cumbrous. Representations were made by Joseph Stevenson, and the scheme of 1857 was the direct outcome of this appeal. Alongside Romilly and Stevenson, another key figure in shaping the direction of the project in its early years was Thomas Duffus Hardy, who served as Deputy Keeper of the Public Records from 1861 to 1878. The first two volumes were published in February 1858: they were the first volume of Stevenson's own edition of the Historia Ecclesie Abbendonensis, a 12th-century chronicle written at Abingdon Abbey (the second and final volume appeared a few months later); and F. C. Hingeston's edition of John Capgrave's fifteenth-century Historia de Illustribus Henricis. Hingeston's work was slapdash, and reviews were unfavourable.

Prolific and well-regarded editors for the series included William Stubbs (19 volumes), H. R. Luard (17 volumes), and H. T. Riley (15 volumes). Editors were handsomely paid (Stubbs received, over the lifetime of the series, a total of some £6,600; Luard £6,432; and Riley £6,487). However, although editorial standards were often high, there was little supervision or opportunity for enforcing editorial quality, and little incentive for dilatory editors to bring their work to fruition; and as a result there were also less successful editions. In some quarters the project came to be regarded as providing an easy source of income for relatively little work.

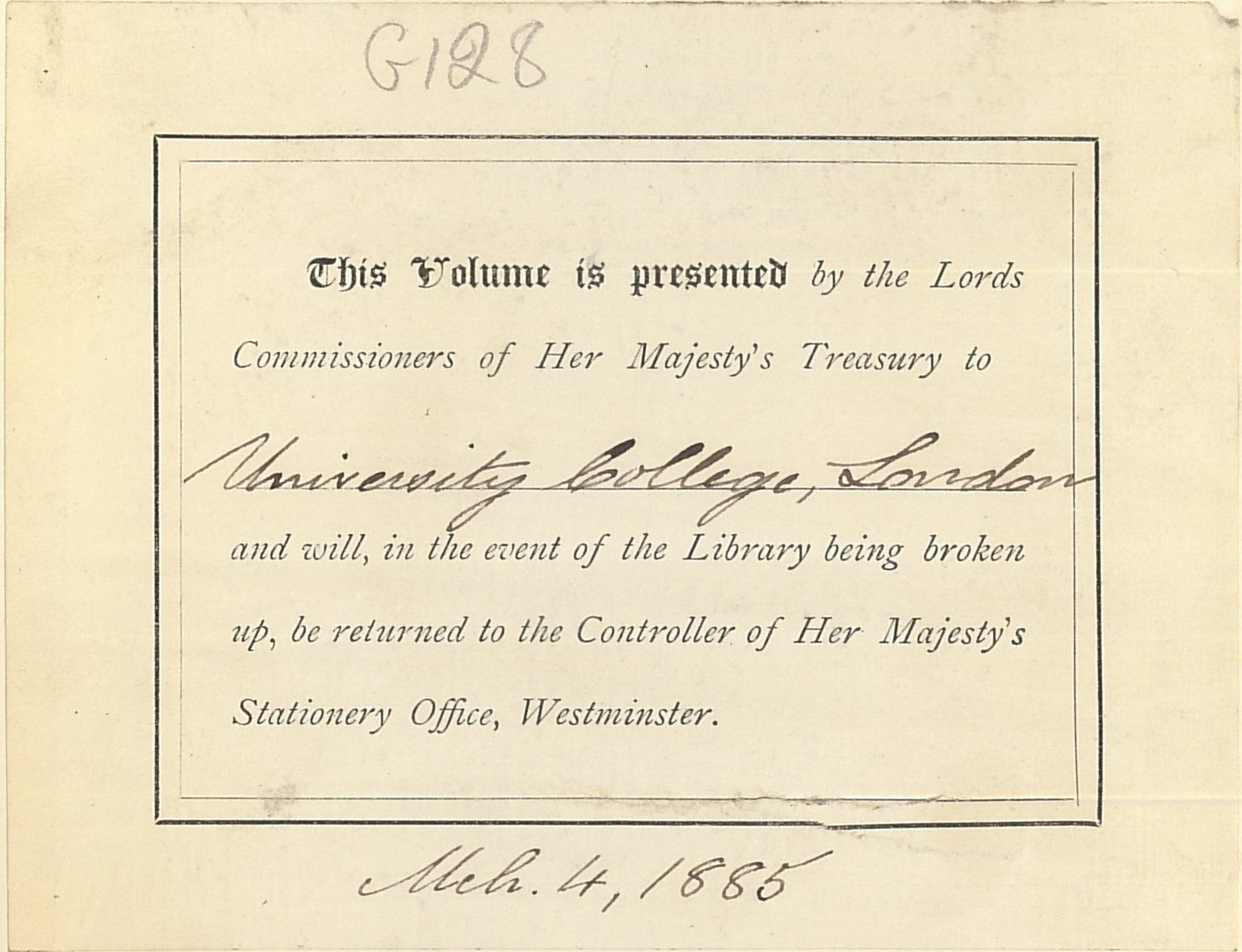
Standard presentation label, in this case in a volume donated to University College, London, reserving the right of the Stationery Office to reclaim the volume in the event of the library being broken up

At the beginning of the project Romilly insisted on a print run of 1,500 for each volume, but this proved greatly over-optimistic in terms of sales, and 750 became the normal figure. The retail price per volume was initially 8s. 6d., later rising to 10s. Initial sales figures for each volume generally reached something over 200 copies: this left considerable surplus stock, and so in the 1880s William Hardy, as Deputy Keeper, introduced the practice of presenting free copies to reputable public and university libraries, with a label inserted stating that "in the event of the Library being broken up", the volume should be returned to the Controller of Her Majesty's Stationery Office.

Funding for the project began to be reduced from the mid-1880s, particularly following the appointment as Deputy Keeper in 1886 of Henry Maxwell Lyte, who was concerned about the scholarly quality and pace of production, the funds being paid to unproductive editors, and who felt that his office's priorities should lie elsewhere. Thereafter, although work continued on editions already in progress, few new works were initiated. One of the final works in the series was the 13th-century legal compilation known as the Red Book of the Exchequer, edited by Hubert Hall of the Public Record Office and published in three volumes in 1897. This became the occasion of a virulent and intemperate scholarly feud between Hall and J. H. Round (who had been co-editor, but who withdrew for reasons of ill-health and subsequently fell out with Hall): Round described the eventual edition as "so replete with heresy and error as to lead astray for ever all students of its subject", and "probably the most misleading publication in the whole range of the Rolls series". The last volume to be commissioned was the Memoranda de Parliamento (records of the parliament held at Westminster in 1305), edited by F. W. Maitland, which appeared in 1893; while the final volume to reach print was the second part of the Year Book for the 20th year of Edward III (1346–7), edited by L. O. Pike, which appeared in 1911.

== Scope ==
Chronicles published in the series included the edition of the Chronica Majora of Matthew Paris by H. R. Luard; the chronicles of Roger of Hoveden, Benedict of Peterborough, Ralph de Diceto, Walter of Coventry, and others, edited by William Stubbs; the works of Giraldus Cambrensis by J. S. Brewer; and the Materials for the History of St Thomas Becket by James Craigie Robertson.

However, the scope of the series was not limited to conventional chronicles. It also encompassed materials of a more or less legendary character relating to Ireland and Scotland, such as Whitley Stokes's edition of The Tripartite Life of St. Patrick, and the Icelandic sagas edited by Guðbrandur Vigfússon and G.W. Dasent; rhymed chronicles like those of Robert of Gloucester and Robert of Brunne in English, and that of Pierre de Langtoft in French; quasi-philosophical works like those of Roger Bacon and Alexander Neckam, together with folklore materials like the three volumes of Leechdoms, Wortcunning and Starcraft of Anglo-Saxon times.

Archival records and legal tracts, such as the Year Books of Edward I and Edward III, the Black Book of the Admiralty, the Red Book of the Exchequer, and Bracton's work De Legibus et Consuetudinibus Angliæ were also included; as were hagiographical documents, dealing for example with the lives of St Dunstan, St Edward the Confessor, St Hugh of Lincoln, St Thomas Becket, and St Wilfrid and other northern saints.

== Editorial policy ==
In the series as proposed, "preference was to be given in the first instance to such materials as were most scarce and valuable", each chronicle was to be edited as if the editor were engaged on an editio princeps, and a brief account was to be provided in a suitable preface of the life and times of the author as well as a description of the manuscripts used.

The vast bulk of the texts are in Latin, printed without translation. Scribal abbreviations are silently extended. Texts in Old French, Old English, Irish, Gaelic, Welsh, Old Norse, etc. have a translation annexed.

Volumes were published in octavo format.

== Kraus reprints ==
Many of the Rolls Series volumes were reprinted under licence in the 1960s and 1970s by the Kraus Reprint Corporation (part of the Kraus-Thomson Organization Ltd.) of Millwood, New York.

== Numbering of volumes ==
The works published within the series were not sequentially numbered (although the individual parts of multi-volume works were numbered). This has presented bibliographers and librarians with a number of problems, and citations of volumes, and their arrangement within libraries, has therefore varied. Many libraries, however, adopted the unofficial numbering scheme, 1–99, used within HMSO Sectional List 24, British National Archives.

== See also ==
- Record Commission
- Text publication society
- Knighton's Chronicon
