= Peniarth 32 =

15th-century Welsh legal manuscript

Peniarth Manuscript 32 is a fifteenth-century volume of the laws of Hywel Dda that contains a brief chronicle from Gwrtheyrn Gwrtheneu to King John, Paul's Vision, the Tree of the Cross, Brutus Saxonum, and various englynion. It is beautifully written on vellum in the hand of the scribe responsible for the Mabinogion in the Red Book of Hergest, and is bound in white vellum.

It is held in the National Library of Wales, Aberystwyth, as part of the Peniarth Manuscripts collection.
