= Henry Petrie (antiquary) =

English antiquary and official

Henry Petrie (1768–1842) was an English antiquary and official.

== Early life ==
Petrie was the son of a schoolmaster in Stockwell, Surrey. Through Thomas Frognall Dibdin, a pupil at the school, he was introduced to George Spencer, 2nd Earl Spencer, who encouraged his early works on historic buildings. Petrie became a close friend of Dibdin, and helped with his bibliographical work.

== Work on records ==
On the death of Samuel Lysons in 1819, Petrie was appointed keeper of the records in the Tower of London. He had already revived an old idea of John Pinkerton for a major collection of historical material. Consultation with Earl Spencer led to the conclusion that government support would be needed, and Petrie was asked to draw up a plan. It was presented to the Record Commission in 1821, and was approved by the government and parliament.

The work began in 1823, with Petrie as chief editor, assisted by John Sharpe (1769–1859), his brother-in-law. The Welsh portion was given to John Humffreys Parry (killed in the street in 1825) and Aneurin Owen, and was published in 1841. The main portion entrusted to Petrie proceeded steadily until 1832, when it was interrupted by his illness.

In 1835, when the text of the first volume had been completed, the work was suspended by the record commissioners. Francis Palgrave had criticised the approach, which followed that of Martin Bouquet, and divided texts into extracts arranged chronologically.

== Death ==
Petrie died unmarried at Stockwell, on 17 March 1842.

== Works ==
One volume of the project was completed and published in 1848 by Thomas Duffus Hardy, who had been trained by Petrie, as Monumenta Historica Britannica, subtitled or Materials for the History of Great Britain from the Earliest Period to the Norman Conquest. Petrie also edited Magni Rotuli Scaccarii Normanniæ, 1830; and his translation of the earlier portion of the Anglo-Saxon Chronicle was reprinted from the Monumenta in the Church Historians of England, 1854, vol. ii. pt. i.

== Notes ==
Attribution

This article incorporates text from a publication now in the public domain: Lee, Sidney, ed. (1896). "Petrie, Henry". Dictionary of National Biography. Vol. 45. London: Smith, Elder & Co.
