= Black Book of Chirk =

Welsh 13th century legal and historical manuscript

The Black Book of Chirk (Welsh: Llyfr Du o'r Waun) is a 13th-century Welsh-language manuscript, known also as the Chirk Codex. It is Peniarth 29 of the National Library of Wales, and deals with legal and historical matters. It contains also an elegy addressed at Llywelyn ap Iorwerth; king of Wales. This poem was probably written by his grandson Llywelyn ap Gruffudd who lived in the 13th century.

The Black Book of Chirk was one of the collection of manuscripts amassed at the mansion of Hengwrt, near Dolgellau, Gwynedd, by Welsh antiquary Robert Vaughan (c. 1592 – 1667); the collection later passed to the newly established National Library of Wales as the Peniarth or Hengwrt-Peniarth Manuscripts.

The manuscript's association with Chirk in north Wales is not known to go back beyond the 16th century. Aneurin Owen called it Manuscript A, of the "Venedotian code". John Gwenogvryn Evans claimed it was the oldest surviving manuscript of Welsh law, dating it to 1220, and he published a facsimile in 1909. Joseph Loth deduces a similar age in 1911 (Revue Celtique 32) and in 1932 he explains his point of view in an article (revue Celtique 48). It is now regarded as a derivative work, a partial copy of the Iorwerth Redaction in one manuscript line, and somewhat later in the century.

Some of the historical content, such as the details of tradition relating to the sixth-century dynast Mordaf Hael, is not now regarded as significant factually.
