= Cyfraith Hywel =

Codification of Welsh laws from the time of King Hywel Dda

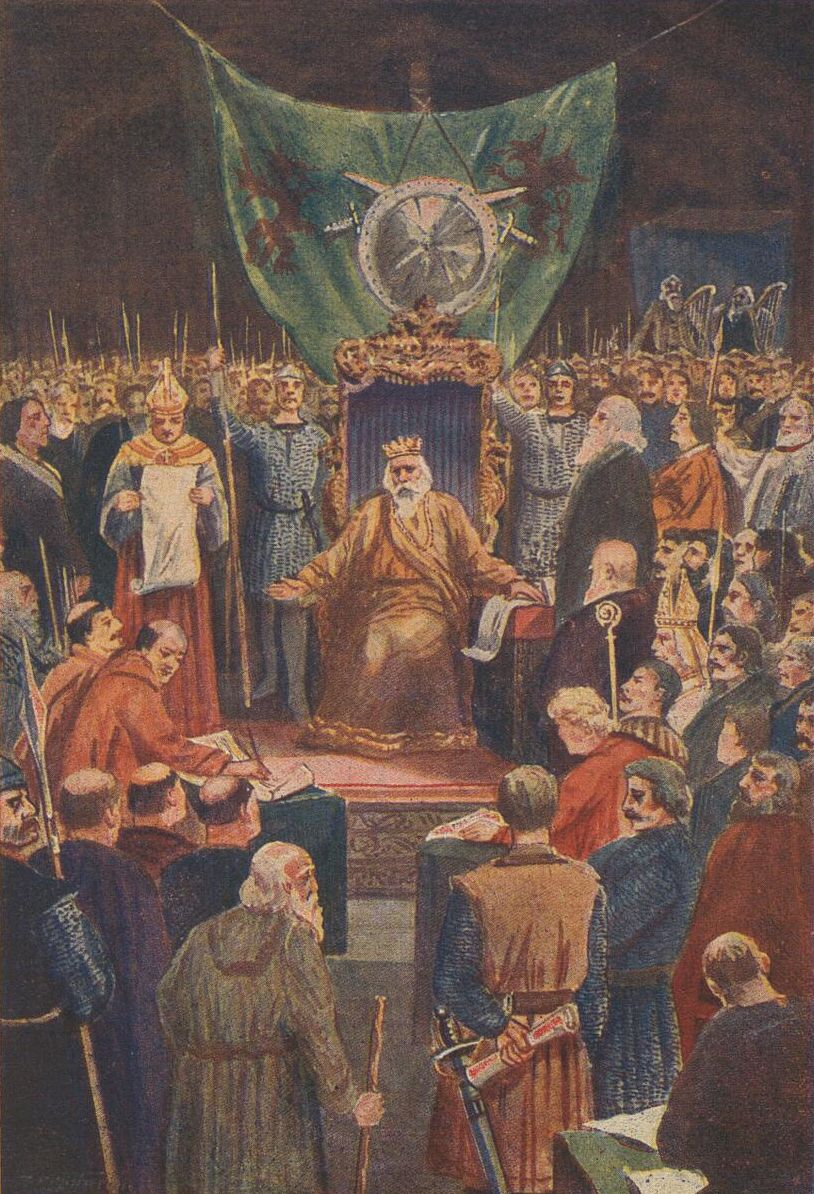
Modern depiction of Hywel Dda proclaiming the laws

Cyfraith Hywel (Welsh: [ˈkəvraiθ ˈhəwɛl]; 'laws of Hywel'), also known as Welsh law (Latin: Leges Walliæ), (Note: Other names used by some manuscripts include Leges Howeli Boni, Leges Howeli Dha, Leges Howelda, Leges Wallicæ, &c.) was the system of law practised in medieval Wales before its final conquest by England. Subsequently, the Welsh law's criminal codes were superseded by the Statute of Rhuddlan in AD 1284 and its civil codes by Henry VIII's series of Laws in Wales Acts between 1535 and 1542.

Welsh law was a form of Celtic law with many similarities to the Brehon law of Ireland and particularly the customs and terminology of the Britons of Strathclyde. It was passed down orally by jurists and bards and, according to tradition, only first codified during the reign of Hywel Dda in the mid-10th century. The earliest surviving manuscripts, however, are in Latin, date from the early 13th century, and show marked regional differences. The law is only known to have been revised by a few rulers (particularly Bleddyn ap Cynfyn, who was credited with revisions retained in the kingdom of Powys) but was obviously updated by jurists in response to changing jurisdictions and circumstances, so that the surviving manuscripts cannot be considered an accurate portrayal of Hywel's first code.

Notable features of Welsh law include the collective responsibility of kindreds (cenedl) for their members; the gavelkind inheritance of land among all and only male descendants; a status-based system of blood money (galanas); slavery and serfdom; the inability of foreigners to naturalise earlier than the fourth generation; and very lax treatment of divorce and legitimacy that scandalised the non-native clergy.

== Overview ==
The laws include the "laws of the court", the laws laying down the obligations and entitlements of the king and the officers of his court and the "laws of the country" dealing with every other topic. In some versions of the laws some of the material in the laws of the country are split off into the "justices' test book" dealing with homicide, theft and the values of wild and tame animals and other items. Within each of these sections there are tracts of varying length dealing with different subjects, for example the law of women and the law of contracts. Civil law differed from most other codes of law in the rule that on a landowner's death his land was to be shared equally between his sons, legitimate and illegitimate. This caused conflict with the church, as under canon law illegitimate children could not inherit.

Once a case came to court, the method used to come to a decision was usually by compurgation. Under this system the person accused or the parties to a dispute would give their version under oath, following which they had to find a number of others who would take an oath that the principal's oath could be trusted. The number of compurgators required depended on the nature of the case. The judge or judges would then come to a decision. Capital punishment was only prescribed for a small number of crimes. Homicide was usually dealt with by the payment of compensation to the victim's family, while theft could be punished by death only if it was theft by stealth and the thief was caught with the goods in hand; the value of the goods stolen also had to exceed four pence. Most other offences were punished by a fine.

== Origins ==
Most of the surviving manuscripts of Welsh law start with a preamble explaining how the laws were codified by Hywel. The introduction to the Book of Blegywryd is a typical example:

Hywel the Good, son of Cadell, by the grace of God, king of all Wales... summoned to him from every commote of his kingdom six men who were practised in authority and jurisprudence... to the place called the White House on the Taf in Dyfed. ... And at the end of Lent the king selected from that assembly the twelve most skilled laymen of his men and the one most skilled scholar who was called Master Blegywryd, to form and interpret for him and for his kingdom, laws and usages...

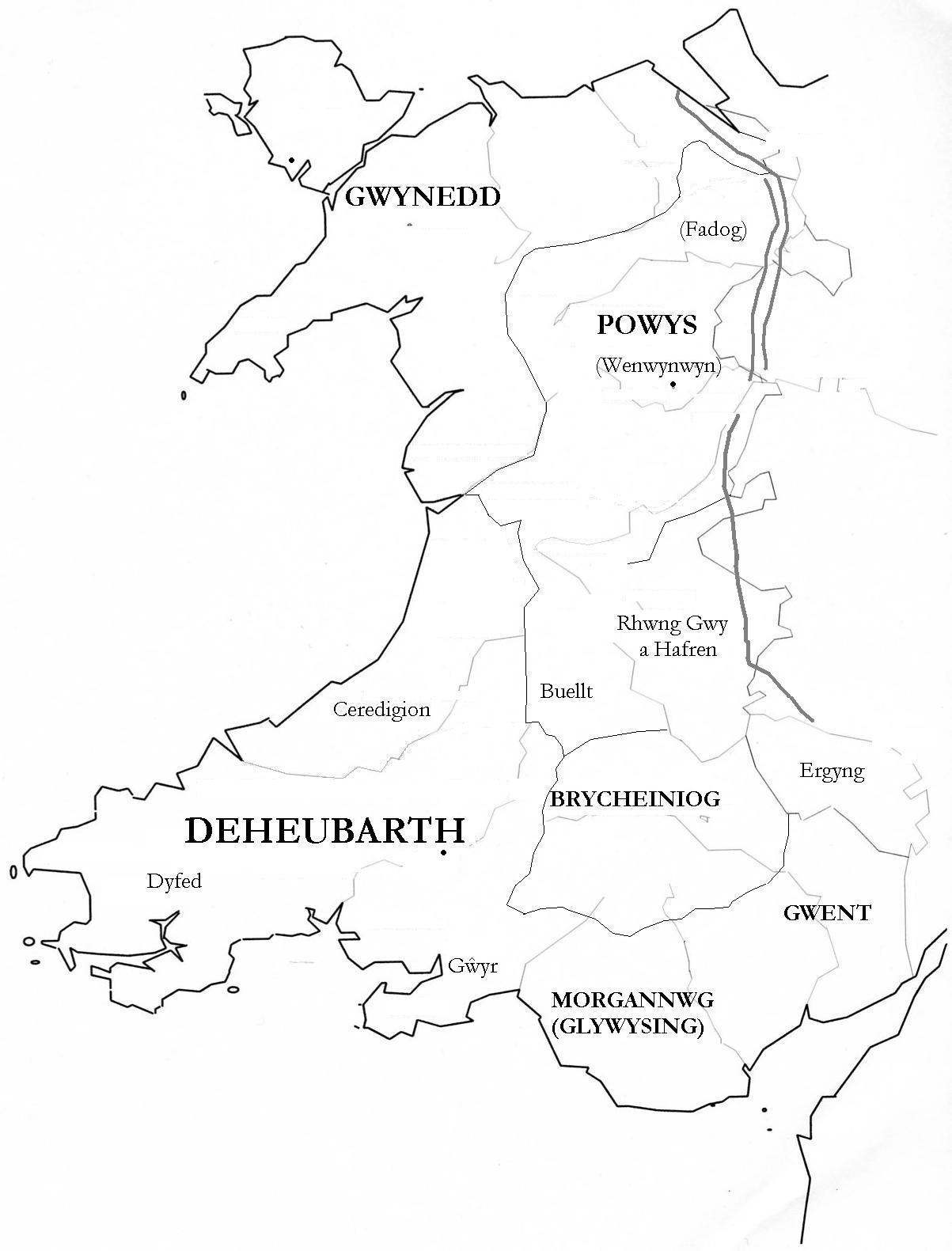
Medieval Kingdoms of Wales

As each of the manuscripts dates from centuries later than Hywel's time, this statement cannot be used to date the event described above. Professor Huw Pryce has demonstrated that some of the prologues were developed in response to attacks on Welsh law by Church men and Nobles who wished to gain rights more akin to those enjoyed by Ecclesiastics and the aristocracy in England. In discussing Hywel's association with the law, K. L. Maund suggests:

it is not impossible that the association of Hywel with the law reflects more on twelfth- and thirteenth century south Welsh attempts to re-establish the importance and influence of their line in an age dominated by the princes of Gwynedd.

On the other hand, the Iorwerth versions, produced in Gwynedd, have exactly the same attribution of the law to Hywel and the council at Whitland as do the southern versions.

The best that may be said of Hywel's association with the law is that a folk memory recalled a revision and rejuvenation of the law during his reign. Other kings are said to have introduced later modifications to the laws, for example Bleddyn ap Cynfyn, king of Gwynedd and Powys in the mid 11th century.

Some of the legal material, such as the tract on the Seven Bishop Houses of Dyfed, may be dated to a very early period of law. Other material bears comparison with Early Irish Law.

== Manuscripts ==
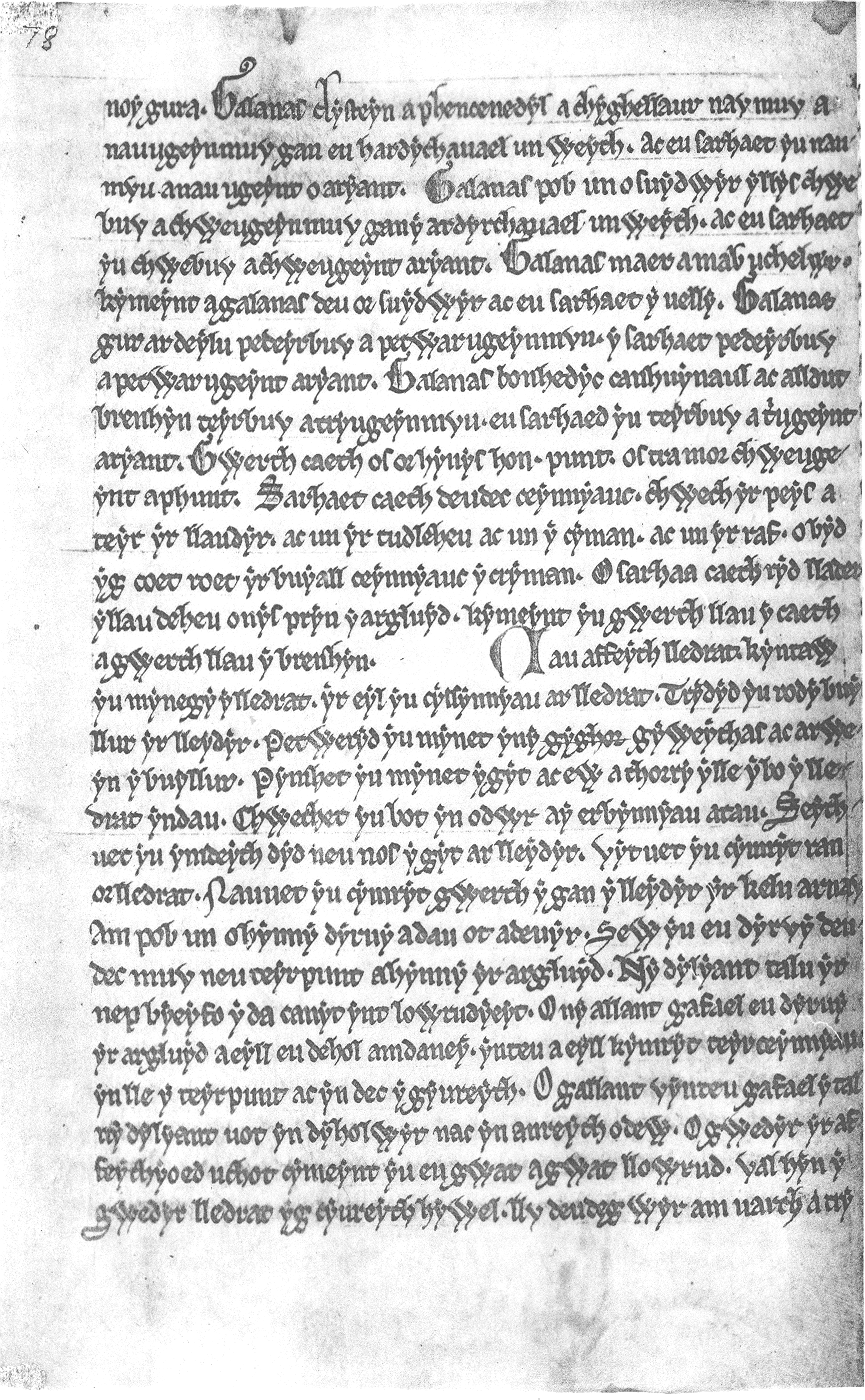
A page from the Black Book of Chirk (Peniarth 29)

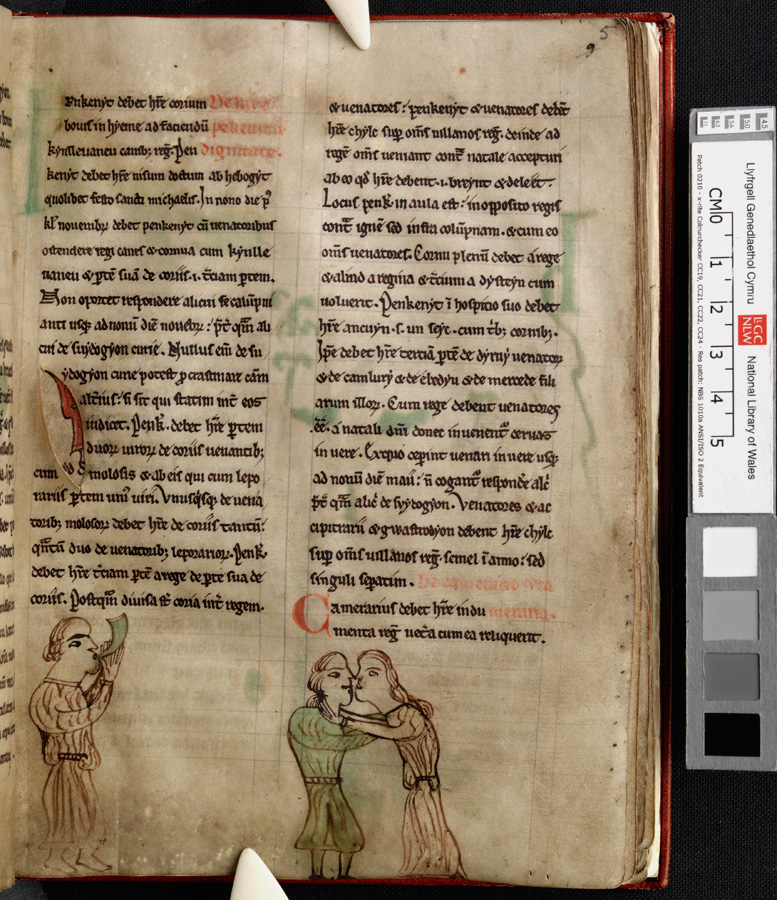
A page from a 13th Century Latin version of the laws of Hywel Dda. NLW, Pen.28

Although there are a substantial number of manuscripts containing the law texts (for example, NLW MS 20143A), there are no existing manuscripts of law texts dating back to the time of Hywel and Welsh law was continually being revised and updated. There has been some debate among scholars as to whether the laws were originally written in Welsh or Latin. The Surexit memorandum in the Lichfield Gospels is a record of the outcome of legal proceedings dating from the 9th century and written in Welsh, and though it is not a law manual it does indicate the use of Welsh legal terms at that time. The earliest manuscripts known are Peniarth 28, written in Latin but now generally thought to be a translation of a Welsh original, and Peniarth 29, known as the Black Book of Chirk, written in Welsh. These are thought to date from the early or mid 13th century. There are a large number of law manuscripts, written mainly in Welsh but some in Latin, written between this period and the 16th century. Later manuscripts have been shown to reflect legal developments particularly in the Southern Welsh lordships. Apart from the full compilations there are shorter versions thought to have been working copies used by judges. However they are all usually considered to fall into three Redactions, known as the Cyfnerth Redaction, the Blegywryd Redaction and the Iorwerth Redaction.

- The Cyfnerth Redaction, thought to be linked to the area between the River Wye and the River Severn, possibly Maeliennydd, includes some of the least developed law. It is thought to have been compiled in the late 12th century when this area came under the rule of the Lord Rhys of Deheubarth.
- The Blegywryd Redaction is associated with Deheubarth and shows signs of the influence of the church.
- The Iorwerth Redaction is thought to represent the law as modified in Gwynedd during the reign of Llywelyn the Great in the first part of the 13th century by the jurist Iorwerth ap Madog. This is considered to be the most developed version of the law, though it does contain some archaic passages. The version in Llyfr Colan is thought to be a revision of Iorwerth, though also from the 13th century, and there is also the Llyfr y Damweiniau (possibly best translated as "The book of happenings", modern literal translation "The book of mistakes"), a collection of case-law linked to Colan. No manuscript has survived from Powys, though the Iorwerth Redaction does indicate where usage in Powys differs from usage in Gwynedd.

== Laws of the court ==
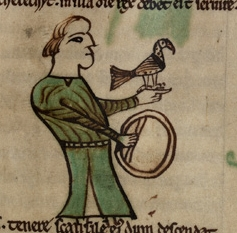
Drawing of a falconer from Peniarth 28

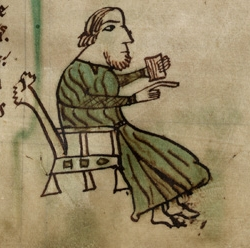
An illumination of a Welsh judge (MS. Peniarth 28)

The first part of the laws deal with the rights and duties of the king and the officers of the king's court. The order of precedence is set down: first the king, then the queen, then the etifedd or edling, the heir. Next come the officers of the court; the Iorwerth Redaction identifies twenty-four, of whom sixteen are the king's officers and eight the queen's officers. First in rank was the captain of the household troops, then the priest of the household, then the steward followed by the chief falconer, the court justice, the chief groom and the chamberlain. A list of additional officers follows, including such officers as the groom of the rein, the porter, the bakeress and the laundress. Each officer's entitlements and obligations are listed.

It introduces a number of legal terms. Sarhad could mean an insult or injury or the payment that was due to a person in the event of an insult or injury, and this varied according to the status of the person concerned, for example the queen or the edling's sarhad was one third that of the king. Galanas was a form of weregild and represented the value of a person's life in the event of a homicide and was set at three times the sarhad, though the sarhad was also payable by the killer. Dirwy was a fine payable for crimes and camlwrw a smaller fine for less serious offences, while ebediw was a death duty payable to the deceased's lord. Sarhad and dirwy are still Welsh words meaning 'insult' and 'fine' respectively,

The origins of the various redactions are reflected in the relative position of the rulers of the Welsh kingdoms. The Iorwerth Redaction manuscripts proclaim the superiority of the king of Aberffraw, chief seat of the kingdom of Gwynedd, over the others, while the manuscripts from Deheubarth claim at least equality for the king of Dinefwr, chief seat of the southern kingdom.

While Welsh law lays more emphasis on the powers of the king than the Brehon Law of Ireland, this is still restricted compared to many other codes. As Moore comments:

Welsh law fell into the juristic category of Volksrecht ("people's law"), which did not lay great stress on royal power, as opposed to the Kaisersrecht or Königsrecht ("king's law") of both England and Scotland, where it was emphasised that both civil and common law were imposed by the state.

== Laws of the country ==
=== Classes ===
For the purposes of the laws, Welsh society was divided into five classes: the rulers, including the king (rhi or brenin) over his kingdom and the lords over their fiefs; the free Welsh, including both the pedigreed aristocracy (boneddigion or uchelwyr) and the yeomen together; the Welsh serfs (taeogion, ailltion, or bileiniaid); foreigners resident in Wales (alltudion); and the slaves (caethion). (Note: Note that Aneurin Owen, however, considered caethion as synonymous with ailltion by the time of Hywel. (Ancient Laws and Institutes of Wales, Glossary).) The privileges, penalties, and obligations due by law varied with the social status of the person concerned.

=== Naturalization ===
At the time of Hywel's laws, Cymry – the modern Welsh for all of the Welsh people – apparently only applied to the free classes and not to serfs or slaves. However, none of them counted as a "foreigner" and, even if they moved from one Welsh "kingdom" (gwlad, lit. 'country' or 'nation' in Welsh) to another, they did not suffer that status but were considered fully native.

Those from outside Wales were considered between serfs and slaves, forbidden to offer testimony, and obliged to pledge themselves to a native Welshman (even a serf) who would be responsible for them. This status could only be removed after three generations in the north and possibly as many as nine elsewhere, after which the foreigner's descendants were considered to be native serfs.

=== Laws of women ===
The position of women under Welsh law differed significantly to that of their Norman-English contemporaries. A marriage could be established in two basic ways. The normal way was that the woman would be given to a man by her kindred; the abnormal way was that the woman could elope with a man without the consent of her kindred. In this case her kindred could compel her to return if she was still a virgin, but if she was not she could not be compelled to return. If the relationship lasted for seven years she had the same entitlements as if she had been given by her kin.

A number of payments are connected with marriage. Amobr, or commutation-fee, was a fee payable to the woman's lord on the loss of her virginity, whether on marriage or otherwise. Cowyll, or maiden-fee, was a payment due to the woman from her husband on the morning after the marriage, marking her transition from virgin to married woman. Dower (agweddi) was the amount of the common pool of property owned by the couple which was due to the woman if the couple separated before the end of seven years. The total of the agweddi depended on the woman's status by birth, regardless of the actual size of the common pool of property. If the marriage broke up after the end of 7 years, the woman was entitled to half the common pool. The portion that was immediately accessible during the marriage, consisting usually of linens, dishes, and other domestic items, was known as argyvrau.

If a woman found her husband with another woman, she was entitled to a payment of six score pence (i.e. half a pound) the first time and a pound the second time; on the third occasion she was entitled to divorce him. If the husband had a concubine, the wife was allowed to strike her without having to pay any compensation, even if it resulted in the concubine's death. A woman could only be beaten by her husband for three things: for giving away something which she was not entitled to give away, for being found with another man, or for wishing a blemish on her husband's beard. If he beat her for any other cause, she was entitled to the payment of sarhad. If the husband found her with another man and beat her, he was not entitled to any further compensation. According to the law, women were not allowed to inherit land. However, there were exceptions, even at an early date. A poem dated to the first half of the 11th century is an elegy for Aeddon, a landowner on Anglesey. The poet says that after his death his estate was inherited by four women who had originally been brought to Aeddon's court as captives after a raid and had found favour with him. The rule for the division of moveable property when one of a married couple died was the same for both sexes. The property was divided into two equal halves, with the surviving partner keeping one half and the dying partner being free to give bequests from the other half.

=== Criminal law ===
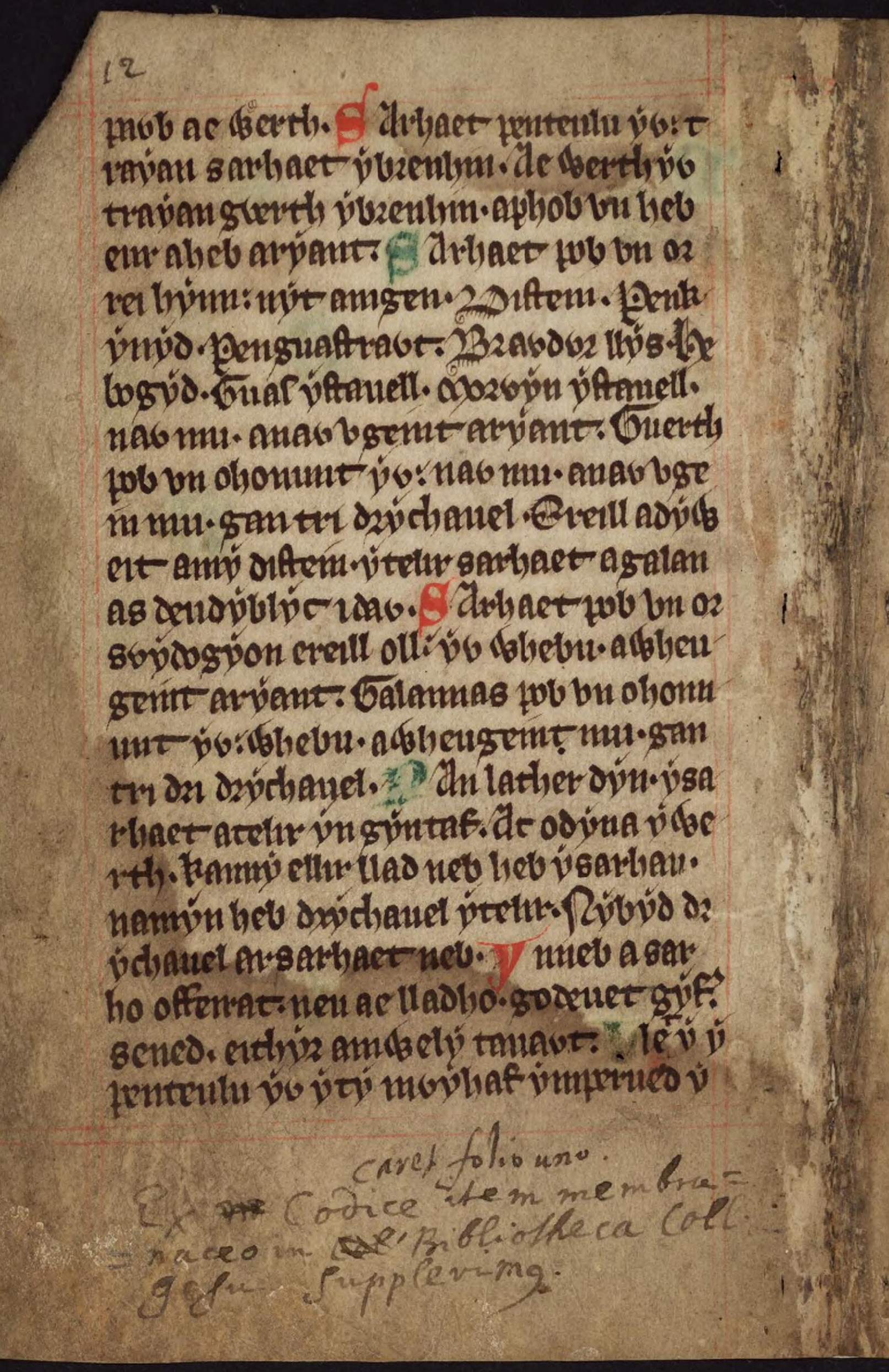
The 'Boston Manuscript'. An annotated 14th century Welsh version of the laws (f.6.v)

Murder was regarded as an offence against the family rather than against society or the state. It was normally dealt with by the payment of blood money (galanas) by the killer and his extended family to the family of the deceased. The base sum was computed by the social status and position of the victim. The galanas of the king of Deheubarth was set at an impossibly long line of impossibly perfect cattle to ensure it could never be met; the family of a murdered slave, meanwhile, received no galanas, although the slave's owner was to be compensated for the loss. This sum might then be modified in certain situations (for example, an attack from ambush doubled the base fine). Upon the payment of the blood money, the victim's family was then legally bound to forgo its vengeance (dial). Murder by poison, however, carried the death penalty.

Assault or offenses against honour were dealt with in a similar fashion, through a fine called sarhaed. However, it only applied to the upper classes: any serf who struck a free man was liable to have the offending limb removed.

The crime of rape was treated as a theft and remedied by the payment of another fine (dirwy), payment of which restored the woman's virginity for legal purposes. A man who could not pay the fine was to have his testicles removed.

Similarly, a convicted thief was imprisoned in the first instance, but a serf convicted for the third time was to have his hand removed. (Assuming he was not caught in the act: thieves caught with goods in hand more valuable than four ceiniogau were liable for hanging.) Such strong penalties led the Welsh to narrowly define "theft", however: forcible robbery was considered much less serious. Further, a hungry man who had passed at least three towns without receiving a meal could not be punished for stealing food.

Aiding and abetting – including witnessing a killing and failing to protect the victim or receiving stolen property – was also punished with dirwy fines.

Although Hywel's commission generally recorded the traditions of the country, one modification they made was to end the right of nobles to trial by combat, finding it unjust.

=== Compensation ===
Medieval Welsh law placed a high value on compensation for any breach of the law. In particular, high and detailed compensation values were given for each limb of the body. There are nine limbs of equal value (that is the hands, the eyes, the lips, the feet, and the nose) each of which is valued at 480 pennies, every other limb is carefully valued and can be altered depending on various influencing factors.

The values given to eyes, ears, nose, lips, hands, and feet are identical; termed as the 'Limbs of equal value' they represent 12.7% of the standard galanas for a boneheddig (A boneheddig is a standard free-man, whose galanas is valued at 3780 pennies/ 63 cows). There are no additional complexities to any of these costs, except when it comes to ears. The Iorwerth manuscripts and LATIN A do not value the ear itself at 480 pennies, instead they differentiate between the loss of an ear and the loss of hearing. If the ear is lost but the victim can still hear, then the price lies at 160 pennies, whilst deafness (even without the loss of ear) retains the 480 penny value. This is a rare example of a 'functional value being given where the loss of the function of the ear... is appreciated and not the organ itself'. Harris notes that although these members are all given equal value, it seems there is some underlying notion that some are perhaps more essential than others (at least in the Iorwerth and LATIN A texts) with hearing being more important than any of the other senses.

Fingers are valued at 80 pence each, whilst a thumb has a value of 180 pence which corresponds to its use in 'gripping agricultural equipment or arms'. The Iorwerth and Cyfnerth 5 recensions value a finger nail at 30 pence, whilst the top of the finger to the first knuckle is valued (in the same texts) at 26 2/3 of a penny. The price of a fingernail as it is valued in Iorwerth and Cyfnerth is 0.8% of the galanas, and intriguingly the thumbnail in the Wessex tariff also stands at 0.8% of the wergild value for the man.[7] Harris argues that these similar percentages reflect the co-existence of two legal systems in Wales; the Welsh and the English.

The triad known as the Tri Arberygl Dyn (Three Dangerous wounds of man) specifies three injuries for which

'teyr punt a geyf y nep a archoller y gan y nep ay harchollo'

'He who is wounded shall have 3 pounds from him who wounds him'.

These are; when a man is cut so that the brains can be seen, when a man is pierced so his entrails can be seen, and when one of the four posts of the body (the limbs) are broken.

The body parts appear to be classed for compensation based on how much use they have in society. The higher the use; the higher the compensation cost. Loss of hearing, for example, as well as loss of testes and/or penis incur very high redress rates, because their loss will cause either danger or an inability to continue lineage, which was highly important in such a kin-based society. The tongue is also particularly high because, as with the ear, it would have formed the primary means of communication for the victim.

Also notable are the different grades of compensation given to wounds depending on the degree of disfigurement produced by the wounding, with a differentiation between craith ogyfarch; a conspicuous scar which attracts remarks, and craith guiddiedig; a hidden scar which will therefore attract less remarks. The craith ogyfarch afforded the most compensation, but the value of the ogyfarch compensation varied according to its noticeability. The three most conspicuous scars are given as those on a face (six score pence), on a hand (sixty pence), and on a foot (thirty pence), whilst a hidden scar is given only four pence. The Latin texts A and E 'make provision for a cloak to cover facial disfigurement' and front teeth were also accorded a higher value than other teeth.

=== Surety and contracts ===
The section on surety lays down the rules if a person acts as mach or surety, for example for a debt, and gives the provisions for various cases, such as where the debtor refuses to pay or denies the debt and where the surety denies the suretyship or contests the sum involved. Rules are also given for the giving and forfeiting of gages. Another aspect is amod or contract, usually made by the two parties calling amodwyr who are witnesses to prove the terms agreed by the parties. It is laid down that:

An amod breaks a rule of law. Though an amod be made contrary to law, it is necessary to keep it.

In what is thought to be an archaic survival in some versions of Iorwerth it is stated that women are not entitled to act as sureties or to give sureties. Later versions of this rule in Iorwerth state that women were entitled to give sureties, and could therefore enter into contracts, though they were still not allowed to act as sureties. In Colan, Cyfnerth and some of the Latin texts women could give sureties and could under certain circumstances act as sureties. This appears to indicate a gradual improvement in the legal position of women in this respect.

=== Land law ===
This is followed by land law, setting out the procedure in the event of rival ownership claims over land. Court was convened on the land itself, with both claimants calling witnesses to support their claims. In the Iorwerth Redaction, it is stated that the claimants were entitled to the representation by both types of lawyer - cyngaws and canllaw. If both claims were deemed to have equal merit, the law allowed for the land to be shared equally between the two claimants.

On the death of a landowner (priodawr) his immovable estate (land) passed in joint tenancy (cytir) to his sons, similar to the gavelkind system of Kent. Then the youngest son partitioned (cyfran) the land equally, and each brother took his share. Illegitimate sons were entitled to shares equal to those of legitimate sons, provided they had been acknowledged by the father. This provision differed the most from canon law; as the Iorwerth text puts it:

The law of the church says that no-one is entitled to patrimony (treftadaeth) save the father's eldest son by his wedded wife. The law of Hywel adjudges it to the youngest son as to the eldest, and judges that the father's sin and his illegality should not be set against the son for his patrimony.

Dadannudd is a son's claim to land which previously belonged to his father. A landowner's right to convey land was restricted; it was only allowed under certain circumstances with the consent of his kindred and coheirs (laudatio parentum). With the consent of the lord and the kindred, the landowner could use the living gage (prid). The land would be made over to a gagee (pridwr) for a period of four years, and if the land had not been redeemed by the gagor (owner) or his heirs at the end of the four years, the gage could then be renewed for additional four-year periods. After three renewals (or 16 years total), the land passed permanently to the gagee.

=== Succession ===
From the time of the fall of Rome, Wales was divided into numerous petty "kingdoms" (gwledydd, lit. "peoples") which were repeatedly unified and then redivided. It is frequently stated that Welsh law demanded the division of a kingdom between all the ruler's sons, but that is a misunderstanding of the inheritance law – the crown itself was unitary but the king's lands (maertref) were required to be divided among all of his acknowledged sons by whatever mother. This naturally weakened the position of the new king and that weakness, along with the long free and separate traditions of the various Welsh gwledydd, then permitted disputes and civil wars among the family appanages. Further, by the time of Hywel, the kingdoms normally taken as independent – Deheubarth, Powys, &c. – were nominally subordinate to the elder line of the family in Gwynedd and bound to display that with annual gifts.

The confusion of the 11th century and the use of the Saxon loanword edling for the heir also seem to have clouded the issue. By law, the principal homestead (and presumably the realm) were to go to the king's eldest son, so long as this potential successor was not damaged in any limb, blind, deaf, or mentally disabled, and of sufficient age. If the eldest son were ineligible for whatever reason, his brothers, uncles, and first and second cousins were all considered legitimate substitutes. Likewise, even when the eldest son did inherit, other descendants of his great-grandfather were considered legitimate rulers and not usurpers if they were able to wrest control away from him.

Finally, although surviving editions of Hywel's law explicitly forbid inheritance by or through female members of the royal family, Hywel's line itself derived from lords of Man who had (allegedly) married into the dynasties of Gwynedd and Powys and there are numerous examples through the 11th century of kings asserting their legitimacy on account of royal mothers, despite surviving underage representatives of the male line of succession.

== The justices' test book ==
This is only a separate section in the Iorwerth Redaction; in the other versions the material is incorporated in the "Laws of the country" section. It is a compilation of the rules for dealing with the "Three Columns of Law", namely cases of homicide, theft and fire, and "The Value of Wild and Tame". There are also appendices dealing with joint ploughing and corn damage by stock.

=== The value of wild and tame ===
"The value of wild and tame" gives the values of various animals, for example:

the value of a cat, fourpence. The value of a kitten from the night it is born until it opens its eyes, a penny, and from then until it kills mice, two pence, and after it kills mice, four pence... A guard dog, if it is killed more than nine paces from the door is not paid for. If it is killed within the nine paces, it is worth twenty-four pence

Values are also given for trees, equipment and parts of the human body. The value of a part of the body was fixed, thus a person causing the king to lose an eye would pay the same as if he had caused a villein to lose an eye. However he would also have to pay sarhad, and this would be far greater for the king than for the villein.

== Administration of the law ==
The main administrative divisions of mediaeval Wales were the cantrefs, each of which was divided into several commotes. These were of particular importance in the administration of the law. Each cantref had its own court, which was an assembly of the "uchelwyr", the main landowners of the cantref. This would be presided over by the king if he happened to be present in the cantref, or if he was not present by his representative. Apart from the judges there would be a clerk, an usher and sometimes two professional pleaders. The cantref court dealt with crimes, the determination of boundaries and matters concerning inheritance. The commote court later took over most of the functions of the cantref court. The judges (Welsh ynad) in Gwynedd were professionals, while in south Wales the professional judges worked together with the free landowners of the district, all of whom were entitled to act as judges.

A person accused of a crime could deny the charge by denying it on oath and finding a certain number of persons prepared to go on oath that they believed his or her own oath, a system known as compurgation. The number of persons required to swear depended on the gravity of the alleged crime; for example denying a homicide could require 300 compurgators, while if a woman accused a man of rape, the man would have to find 50 men prepared to swear to his innocence. For lesser crimes a smaller number would be sufficient. Witnesses could also be called, including eyewitnesses of the crime (gwybyddiaid). A witness who has once been proved to have given false testimony on oath was barred from ever appearing as a witness again.

The task of the judge, having considered the case, was to determine what sort of proof was appropriate and which of the parties was to be required to produce proof, whether by the calling of witnesses, by compurgation or by pledges, then in the light of the proof to adjudicate on the case and impose the appropriate penalty in accordance with the law if a penalty was called for.

According to the Iorwerth Redaction, a prospective judge had to be at least twenty-five years of age and his legal knowledge has to be approved by the Court Justice:

... when his teacher sees that he is worthy, let him send him to the Court Justice, and it is for the Court Justice to test him, and if he finds him worthy, it is for him to send him to the Lord and it is for the Lord to grant him justiceship ... And it is for him to give twenty-four pence to the Court Justice as his fee.

It was possible to appeal against a judge's decision, and the appellant could demand that the judge show the authority of a book for his judgment. The consequences for a judge could be serious if his judgement was reversed, involving a financial penalty equivalent to the value of his tongue as laid down in the values of the parts of the body. He would also be banned from acting as a judge in future.

== Impact of the Norman and Edwardian conquests ==
=== Marcher lordships ===
Welsh law usually applied in the Welsh Marches as well as the areas ruled by Welsh princes. In the event of a dispute, the first argument in the border regions might be about which law should apply. For example, when Gruffydd ap Gwenwynwyn was in dispute with Roger Mortimer about some lands, it was Gruffydd who wanted the case heard under English law and Mortimer who wanted Welsh law to apply. The matter went to the royal justices, who decided in 1281 that since the lands concerned lay in Wales, Welsh law should be used.

=== Edwardian conquest ===
Welsh law came to be a particularly important badge of nationhood in the 12th and 13th centuries, particularly during the struggle between Llywelyn the Last and King Edward I of England in the second half of the 13th century. Llywelyn stated:

Each province under the empire of the lord king has its own laws and customs according to the peculiarities and uses of those parts where it is situated, as do the Gascons in Gascony, the Scots in Scotland, the Irish in Ireland and the English in England; and this conduces rather to the glory of the Crown of the lord king than to its degradation. And so the Prince seeks that he may be able to have his own Welsh law...

The Archbishop of Canterbury, John Peckham when involved in negotiations with Llywelyn on behalf of King Edward in 1282 sent Llywelyn a letter in which he denounced Welsh law, stating that King Hywel must have been inspired by the devil. Peckham had presumably consulted the Peniarth 28 manuscript which was apparently held in the library at St. Augustine's Abbey, Canterbury at this time. One of the features to which the English church objected was the equal share of land given to illegitimate sons. Following Llywelyn's death the Statute of Rhuddlan in 1284 introduced English criminal law into Wales: "in thefts, larcenies, burnings, murders, manslaughters and manifest and notorious robberies — we will that they shall use the laws of England". Nearly two hundred years after Welsh law ceased to be used for criminal cases, the poet Dafydd ab Edmwnd (fl. 1450–80) wrote an elegy for his friend, the harpist Siôn Eos, who had accidentally killed a man in a tavern brawl in Chirk. Siôn Eos was hanged, and Dafydd ab Edmwnd laments that he could not have been tried under the more humane Law of Hywel rather than "the law of London".

Welsh law was still used for civil cases such as land inheritance, contracts, sureties and similar matters, though with changes, for example illegitimate sons could no longer claim part of the inheritance. The Laws in Wales Acts 1535–1542 brought Wales entirely under English law; when the 1535 Act declares the intention utterly to extirpe alle and singular sinister usages and customs belonging to Wales, Welsh law was probably the main target.

== Legacy ==
=== History after the Laws in Wales Acts ===
The last recorded case to be heard under Welsh law was a case concerning land in Carmarthenshire in 1540, four years after the 1536 Act had stipulated that only English law was to be used in Wales. Even in the 17th century in some parts of Wales there were unofficial meetings where points of dispute were decided in the presence of arbiters using principles laid down in Welsh law.

Antiquarian interest in the laws continued, and in 1730 a translation by William Wotton was published. In 1841 Aneurin Owen edited an edition of the laws entitled Ancient laws and institutions of Wales, and was the first to identify the various Redactions, which he named the "Gwentian Code" (Cyfnerth), the "Demetian Code" (Blegywryd) and the "Venedotian Code" (Iorwerth). His edition was followed by a number of other studies in the late 19th and early 20th centuries.

=== Commemorations ===
Carmarthenshire County Council has set up the Hywel Dda Centre in Whitland, with an interpretative centre and garden to commemorate the original council.

=== Contemporary Welsh Law ===
Contemporary Welsh Law is a term applied to the body of primary and secondary legislation generated by the Senedd, according to devolved authority granted in the Government of Wales Act 2006. Each piece of Welsh legislation is known as an Act of the Senedd. The first legislation to be officially proposed was called the NHS Redress (Wales) Measure 2008. These powers have been effective since May, 2007. It is the first time in almost 500 years that Wales has had its own laws, since Cyfraith Hywel was abolished and replaced by English law through the Laws in Wales Acts, passed between 1535 and 1542 by King Henry VIII of England.

There have been multiple calls from both Welsh academics and politicians however for a Wales justice system.

=== Historical assessments ===
Sara Elin Roberts of Aberystwyth University has described the Cyfraith Hywel as relatively modern for their focus on compensation over physical punishment as well as the relative level of freedom it granted women compared to other legal systems.

=== In popular culture ===
Ellis Peters in The Cadfael Chronicles often uses the ancient Welsh laws. The novel called Monk's Hood mentions the Cyfraith Hywel (called Hywel Dda). A recognised son, born out of wedlock has an over-riding claim to his father's property. The manor is in Wales. His demand could be accepted because the manor, lying in Wales, is under Welsh law.

== See also ==
- Celtic law
- Contemporary Welsh Law
- Early Irish law
- Laws of the Brets and Scots
