= Book of Cynog =

Text of medieval Welsh law

The Book of Cynog (Medieval Latin: Liber Knauc; Middle Welsh: Llyfr Kynawc; Welsh: Llyfr Cynog) was a text of medieval Welsh law. It is quoted extensively by surviving sources but does not appear to have survived intact. However, the first 75 folios of Peniarth MS. 35 seem to be a medieval attempt to reconstruct the earlier book.
