= Monumenta Historica Britannica =

Monumenta Historica Britannica (MHB); or, Materials for the History of Britain, From the Earliest Period, is an incomplete work by Henry Petrie, the Keeper of the Records of the Tower of London, assisted by John Sharpe. Only the first volume covering material prior to the Norman Conquest was printed in 1848 by G. E. Eyre & W. Spottiswoode for Her Majesty.^{OCLC 4063392} It was reprinted by Gregg Publishing in March 1971 (ISBN 0576199958).

Petrie drafted the proposal to include all the references to Britain in the Greek and Roman writers, as well as general histories and annals. In 1823 the Record Commission, predecessor to the Public Record Office, gave the task to Henry Petrie. The work was suspended in 1835 by order of the commissioners, after Petrie had prepared the first volume and had started work on the second, "due to a misunderstanding between them and Petrie." Petrie died in 1842. The first volume was posthumously published by Sir Thomas Duffus Hardy, Petrie's successor.

== Volume I. Extending To The Norman Conquest ==
- Preface by Thomas Duffus Hardy

It contains chronicles, or parts thereof, to 1066:

- Æthelweard's Chronicon
- Anglo-Saxon Chronicle
- Annales Cambriae
- Asser
- Bede
- Brut y Tywysogion
- Chronologia brevissima
- Florence of Worcester
- Genealogia regum
- Geoffrey Gaimar
- Gildas
- Guy of Amiens
- Henry of Huntington
- Nennius
- Simeon of Durham
- An account of British and Roman coins by John Doubleday, with 17 full page plates of coins
- Folding map by W. Hughes
- Speeches of Boadicea to her soldiers as reported by the Roman historian, Dio Cassius (epitome of John Xiphilinus)
- Bibliography of over a hundred classical authorities from about 100 A.D. onwards that mention Britain.
