= John Humffreys Parry (antiquary) =

Welsh barrister and antiquarian

John Humffreys Parry (6 April 1786 – 12 February 1825) was a Welsh barrister and antiquarian.

== Life ==
The son of the Rev. Edward Parry and Anne, his wife, he was born 6 April 1786; his father was at the time rector of Llangar, but held the living with the curacy of Mold, Flintshire, where he lived and kept school; he did not move on becoming in 1790 rector of the neighbouring parish of Llanferres. Parry was educated at Ruthin grammar school, and then entered the office of his uncle, Mr. Wynne, a solicitor at Mold.

Inheriting some property on the death of his father, Parry was in 1807 admitted to the Temple, and in 1811 was called to the bar. He practised for a time in the Oxford circuit and the Chester great sessions, but became a writer. In September 1819 he started the Cambro-Briton, a magazine on Welsh history; three volumes appeared (London, 1820, 1821, 1822). He took part in the re-establishment of the Cymmrodorion Society in 1820, and edited the first volume of the society's Transactions (London, 1822). On 12 February 1825 he was attacked and killed in North Street, Pentonville, by a bricklayer named Bennett, with whom he had quarrelled in the Prince of Wales tavern.

== Works ==
When in 1823 an official edition of the old British historians was planned, the Welsh part of the work was given to Parry. In the same year he won prizes at the Carmarthen Eisteddfod for essays on The Navigation of the Britons and The Ancient Manners and Customs of the Britons (printed, with a third prize essay, at Carmarthen, 1825). In 1824 appeared The Cambrian Plutarch (London: some copies have a different title-page from 1834), a collection of short biographies of Welsh worthies.

== Family ==
Parry left a widow, daughter of John Thomas, a solicitor of Llanfyllin, and five children, the eldest being John Humffreys Parry the barrister. After Parry's violent death, a fund of over £1,000 was subscribed.

== Notes ==
Attribution

This article incorporates text from a publication now in the public domain: Lee, Sidney, ed. (1895). "Parry, John Humffreys (1786-1825)". Dictionary of National Biography. Vol. 43. London: Smith, Elder & Co.
